= Listed buildings in Greater Manchester =

Greater Manchester shown in England

There are a number of listed buildings in Greater Manchester, England. In the United Kingdom, the term "listed building" refers to a building or structure designated as being of special architectural or historic interest. Details of all the listed buildings are recorded in the National Heritage List for England. They are categorised into three grades: Grade I for buildings of exceptional interest; Grade II* for particularly important buildings of more than special interest; and Grade II for buildings of special interest. Buildings in England are listed by the Secretary of State for Culture, Media and Sport following recommendations from Historic England, which also determines the grading.

Some listed buildings are cared for by the National Trust or English Heritage, while others remain in private ownership or are administered by independent trusts.

== Listed buildings by grade ==
- Grade I listed buildings in Greater Manchester
- Grade II* listed buildings in Greater Manchester

== Listed buildings by district or unitary authority ==
Within each local government district, buildings are listed by civil parish or unparished area.

=== Bolton ===
- Listed buildings in Blackrod
- Listed buildings in Bolton
- Listed buildings in Farnworth
- Listed buildings in Horwich
- Listed buildings in Kearsley
- Listed buildings in Little Lever
- Listed buildings in South Turton
- Listed buildings in Westhoughton

=== Bury ===
- Listed buildings in Bury
- Listed buildings in Prestwich
- Listed buildings in Radcliffe
- Listed buildings in Ramsbottom
- Listed buildings in Tottington
- Listed buildings in Whitefield

=== Manchester ===
- Manchester Grade II (central)
- Listed buildings in Manchester-M1
- Listed buildings in Manchester-M2
- Listed buildings in Manchester-M3
- Listed buildings in Manchester-M4
- Listed buildings in Manchester-M8
- Listed buildings in Manchester-M9
- Listed buildings in Manchester-M11
- Listed buildings in Manchester-M12
- Listed buildings in Manchester-M13
- Listed buildings in Manchester-M14
- Listed buildings in Manchester-M15
- Listed buildings in Manchester-M16
- Listed buildings in Manchester-M18
- Listed buildings in Manchester-M19
- Listed buildings in Manchester-M20
- Listed buildings in Manchester-M21
- Listed buildings in Manchester-M22
- Listed buildings in Manchester-M23
- Listed buildings in Manchester-M25
- Listed buildings in Manchester-M40
- Listed buildings in Manchester-M60
- Listed buildings in Ringway, Manchester

=== Oldham ===
- Listed buildings in Chadderton
- Listed buildings in Failsworth
- Listed buildings in Lees
- Listed buildings in Oldham
- Listed buildings in Royton
- Listed buildings in Saddleworth
- Listed buildings in Shaw and Crompton

=== Rochdale ===
- Listed buildings in Heywood
- Listed buildings in Littleborough
- Listed buildings in Middleton
- Listed buildings in Milnrow
- Listed buildings in Rochdale
- Listed buildings in Wardle

=== Salford ===
- Listed buildings in Eccles
- Listed buildings in Irlam
- Listed buildings in Salford
- Listed buildings in Swinton and Pendlebury
- Listed buildings in Worsley

=== Stockport ===
- Listed buildings in Bredbury and Romiley
- Listed buildings in Cheadle and Gatley
- Listed buildings in Hazel Grove and Bramhall
- Listed buildings in Marple
- Listed buildings in Stockport

=== Tameside ===
- Listed buildings in Ashton-under-Lyne
- Listed buildings in Audenshaw
- Listed buildings in Denton
- Listed buildings in Droylsden
- Listed buildings in Dukinfield
- Listed buildings in Hyde
- Listed buildings in Longdendale
- Listed buildings in Mossley
- Listed buildings in Stalybridge

=== Trafford ===
- Listed buildings in Altrincham
- Listed buildings in Bowdon
- Listed buildings in Carrington
- Listed buildings in Dunham Massey
- Listed buildings in Hale
- Listed buildings in Partington
- Listed buildings in Sale
- Listed buildings in Stretford
- Listed buildings in Urmston
- Listed buildings in Warburton

=== Wigan ===
- Listed buildings in Abram
- Listed buildings in Ashton-in-Makerfield
- Listed buildings in Aspull
- Listed buildings in Astley
- Listed buildings in Atherton
- Listed buildings in Billinge and Winstanley
- Listed buildings in Golborne
- Listed buildings in Haigh
- Listed buildings in Hindley
- Listed buildings in Ince-in-Makerfield
- Listed buildings in Leigh
- Listed buildings in Orrell
- Listed buildings in Shevington
- Listed buildings in Standish
- Listed buildings in Tyldesley
- Listed buildings in Wigan
- Listed buildings in Worthington

== Churches ==
- Grade I listed churches in Greater Manchester
