= Grade II listed buildings in Manchester =

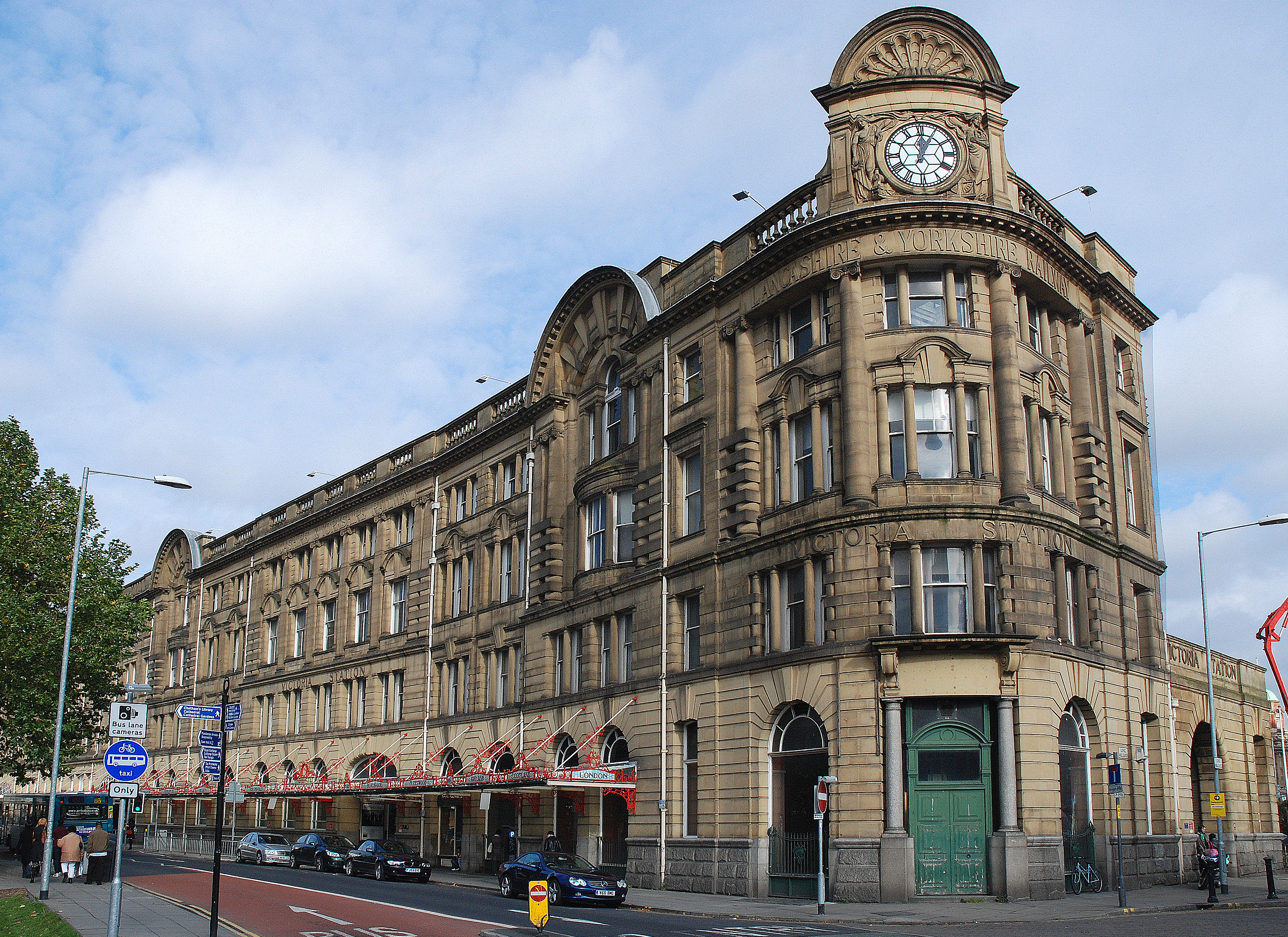
Manchester Victoria station

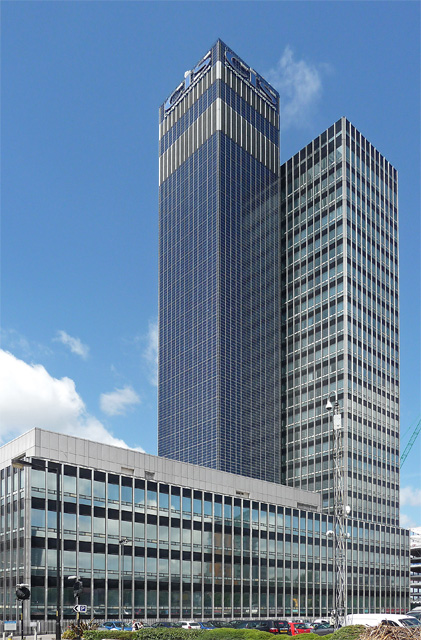
CIS Tower

There are 751 Grade II listed buildings in Manchester, England. In the United Kingdom, the term listed building refers to a building or other structure officially designated as being of special architectural or historic interest. In England, the authority for listing under the Planning (Listed Buildings and Conservation Areas) Act 1990 rests with the Secretary of State for Culture, Media and Sport, advised by Historic England, a non-departmental public body sponsored by the Department for Culture, Media and Sport. Listed buildings are classified into three grades: Grade I, Grade II* and Grade II.

Grade I is the highest listing category, applied to buildings of exceptional interest; only 2.5% of listed buildings are Grade I. Grade II* comprises 5.5% of all listed buildings and denotes structures of particular importance and more than special interest. Grade II structures are those considered to be "of special interest". Manchester has 15 Grade I listed buildings and 81 Grade II* listed buildings.

Because of the number and distribution of listed buildings across the city, the Grade II entries are presented in a series of postcode‑based lists. This page provides an overview of Manchester's Grade II building stock and links to the detailed sublists.

== Architectural context ==
Most of Manchester's Grade II listed buildings date from the Victorian (1837–1901) and Edwardian (1901–1911) periods, when the city expanded rapidly as an industrial and commercial centre. The listings encompass a broad typology: textile mills, warehouses, canal and railway structures, and other industrial buildings; late‑19th and early 20th‑century commercial premises; civic and institutional buildings such as libraries, schools, and public offices; and terraced housing, villas, and suburban developments.

== Lists by M postcode ==
The Grade II listed buildings in Manchester are organised into approximate postcode‑based lists for clarity and ease of navigation. Each list includes detailed entries, descriptions, and coordinates.

List	Approximate coverage
Listed buildings in Manchester-M1	part of the city centre, including the Northern Quarter, Chinatown, and part of Chorlton-on-Medlock
Listed buildings in Manchester-M2	part of the city centre, including part of Deansgate, and the central retail district
Listed buildings in Manchester-M3	the western part of the city centre, including part of Deansgate, and Castlefield
Listed buildings in Manchester-M4	the northeast part of the city centre, including parts of the Northern Quarter, New Islington, and Ancoats
Listed buildings in Manchester-M8	north of the city centre, including Cheetham Hill and Crumpsall
Listed buildings in Manchester-M9	north of the city centre, including Blackley and Harpurhey
Listed buildings in Manchester-M11	east of the city centre, including Clayton, Openshaw and Beswick
Listed buildings in Manchester-M12	southeast of the city centre, including parts of Ardwick, Longsight and Chorlton-on-Medlock
Listed buildings in Manchester-M13	southeast of the city centre, including Victoria Park and parts of Ardwick, Longsight and Chorlton-on-Medlock
Listed buildings in Manchester-M14	south of the city centre, including Fallowfield, Rusholme and part of Moss Side
Listed buildings in Manchester-M15	southwest of the city centre, including Hulme
Listed buildings in Manchester-M16	south of the city centre, including Whalley Range and part of Moss Side
Listed buildings in Manchester-M18	southeast of the city centre, including Gorton
Listed buildings in Manchester-M19	south of the city centre, including Burnage and Levenshulme
Listed buildings in Manchester-M20	the suburbs of Didsbury and Withington
Listed buildings in Manchester-M21	the suburb of Chorlton-cum-Hardy
Listed buildings in Manchester-M22	the suburbs of Northenden and part of Wythenshawe
Listed buildings in Manchester-M23	the area of Baguley and part of Wythenshawe
Listed buildings in Manchester-M25	includes Heaton Park
Listed buildings in Manchester-M40	northeast of the city centre, including parts of Miles Platting, Moston and Clayton
Listed buildings in Manchester-M60	a non-geographic postcode area covering central Manchester

== See also ==
- Grade I listed buildings in Manchester
- Grade II* listed buildings in Manchester
