= Blackley =

Area of Manchester, England

Coordinates: 53.52246°N 2.22282°W

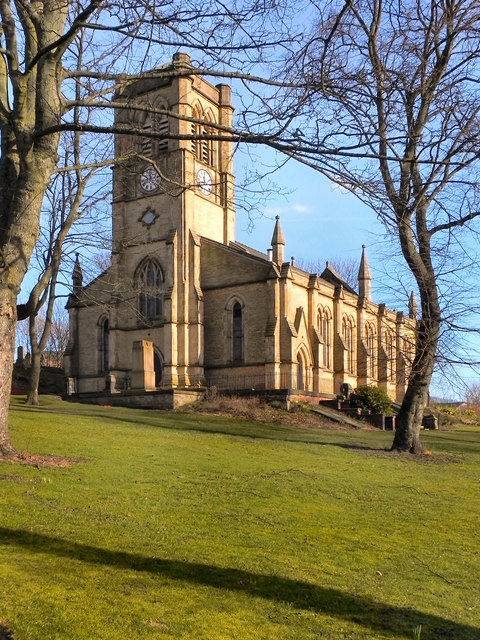
- The Grade II* listed Church of St. Peter

- Location within Greater Manchester
- Population: 10,196 (2001 Census)
- OS grid reference: SD853028
- Metropolitan borough: Manchester
- Metropolitan county: Greater Manchester
- Region: North West
- Country: England
- Sovereign state: United Kingdom
- Post town: MANCHESTER
- Postcode district: M9
- Dialling code: 0161
- Police: Greater Manchester
- Fire: Greater Manchester
- Ambulance: North West
- UK Parliament: Blackley and Middleton South

Blackley /ˈbleɪkli/ is a suburban area of Manchester, in the county of Greater Manchester, England. Historically in Lancashire, it is approximately 4 miles (6.4 km) north of Manchester city centre, on the River Irk.

== History ==
The hamlet of Blackley was mentioned in the Domesday Book. The name derives from the Anglo-Saxon Blæclēah, which means "dark wood" or "dark clearing". In the 13th and 14th centuries, Blackley was referred to as Blakeley or Blakelegh. By the Middle Ages, Blackley had become a park belonging to the lords of Manchester.

Its value in 1282 was recorded as £6 13s 4d, a sum approximately equivalent in buying power to £333,500 today. The lords of Manchester leased the land from time to time. In 1473, John Byron held the leases on Blackley village, Blackley field and Pillingworth fields at an annual rent of £33 6s 8d.

The Byron family continued to hold the land until the beginning of the 17th century, when Blackley was sold in parcels to a number of landowners. By the middle of the 17th century, Blackley was a rural village of just 107 inhabitants.

There was gradual residential development in the 1930s to 1960s, where most farmland was built upon.

Today, only pockets of the suburb are undeveloped green space, with farmland remaining close to the M60 motorway.

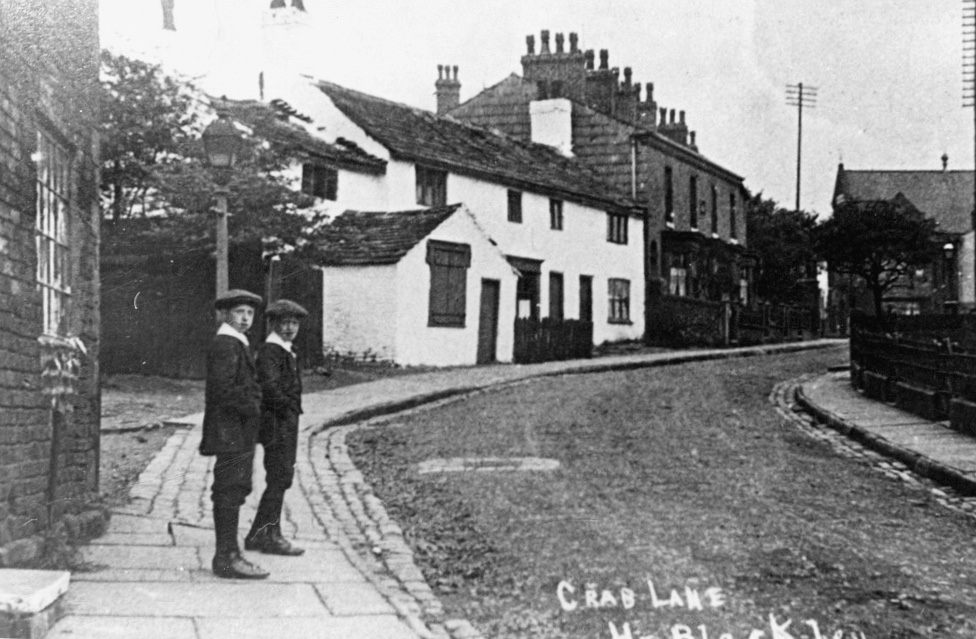
Crab Lane in 1908

Blackley has an important history in the chemical industry, starting with the Borelle Dyeworks founded by Angel Raphael Louis Delaunay in 1785 and run by ICI, who expanded it as a research centre for chemicals and pharmaceuticals. There were several other dye and chemical works. Connolly's Ltd made telecommunication cabling, later becoming part of BICC.

== Governance ==
Blackley, since 2024, has been part of the parliamentary constituency of Blackley and Middleton South. The current Member of Parliament is Graham Stringer of the Labour Party, who was first elected in 1997 for the predecessor constituency Manchester Blackley. The candidate of the Reform UK came second in the general election of 2024, with 21.1% of the vote compared to Stringer's 53.8%.

The suburb is split between the local government wards of Higher Blackley and Charlestown on Manchester City Council. There are two Labour and one Reform UK councillor for each ward.

Blackley was historically in the ancient parish of Manchester, in 1866 Blackley became a civil parish, on 26 March 1896 the parish was abolished to form North Manchester. In 1891 the parish had a population of 7332.

== Economy ==
During the 1930s, residential development started to take place in the formerly rural village to provide more homes for Manchester's growing population. It became an area with a mixture of housing: mainly privately owned homes for owner occupation and private renting. In 2014, Blackley appeared on a list of Top 10 Places to Live In Greater Manchester.

The suburb is popular for commuters into Manchester city centre. The few opportunities to work in the suburb itself include the Hexagon Tower Development, close to North Manchester Hospital, which is a centre for scientific research into plastics and related innovation.

== Church of St Peter ==
The Church of St Peter on Old Market Street is a Gothic Revival church, which was built in 1844 by E. H. Shellard. It was erected at a cost of £3,162. It was designated a Grade II* listed building on 20 June 1988. The interior is aisled and particularly impressive for its complete 170 year old interior, with the extremely unusual survival of all the fine boxes and pews.

The churchyard contains the war graves of ten service personnel of World War I, and seven of World War II.

== Green spaces ==
Blackley has several green spaces:

=== Boggart Hole Clough ===
Boggart Hole Clough is a large woodland and urban country park. The park has a bowling green, tennis and basketball courts, a boating lake and a children's play area. It has its own permanent orienteering course and an athletics track. There is an old stone bridge across the brook running through the clough.

The clough was designated a local nature reserve in 2008.

=== Blackley Forest ===
Blackley Forest is a Site of Biological Importance and an example of one of the country's first Community Woodlands. It was planted to commemorate the Queen's coronation and also local people killed in the Second World War. The area has had woodland on it since the Norman Conquest in 1066, when there were wild boar, deer and eagles.

The forest is a mix of woodland, grassland and wetlands, with a network of paths and steps. The stretch of the River Irk in the forest is fringed by birch trees with some colonies of autumn crocus.

=== Heaton Park ===
Heaton Park, at around 650 acres (2.63 km^{2}), is the biggest park in Greater Manchester, and one of the largest municipal parks in Western Europe, providing some 25% of Manchester's total green space. It is the grounds of Heaton Hall, a Grade I listed, neoclassical 18th-century country mansion. The hall was remodelled to a design by James Wyatt in 1772, and is open to the public as a museum and events venue.

Although the park is officially part of the City of Manchester, two of a number of entrances are accessed from the suburb of Blackley, on Middleton Road.

== Transport ==
Blackley is well served by buses primarily along the main arterial routes of Rochdale Road (A664), and Cheetham Hill Road/Bury Old Road (A665) directly to and from Manchester city centre. Initially these would have been provided by the precursors to, and Manchester Carriage and Tramways Company, and currently by First Greater Manchester.

Other journeys are provided by Stagecoach Manchester, which took over JPT in April 2014. There are frequent Metrolink trams from Bowker Vale to and from Manchester city centre and as far south as Altrincham and as far north as Bury. The M60 orbital motorway is the northern boundary of Blackley.

== Education ==
=== Primary schools ===
Blackley has a number of primary schools, which include:

- Charlestown Community Primary School
- Crab Lane Primary School
- Crosslee Community Primary School
- Holy Trinity CE Primary School
- Mount Carmel RC Primary School
- Pike Fold Primary School
- St Clare's RC Primary School
- St John Bosco RC Primary School
- Victoria Avenue Primary School

=== Secondary schools ===
- The Co-operative Academy of Manchester
- The Co-operative Academy North Manchester
- Our Lady's RC High School.

There are nearest secondary schools, including Manchester Communication Academy.

=== Special and alternative schools ===
- Camberwell Park School
- Manchester Hospital Schools
- North Ridge High School

== Sports ==
Blackley Golf Club

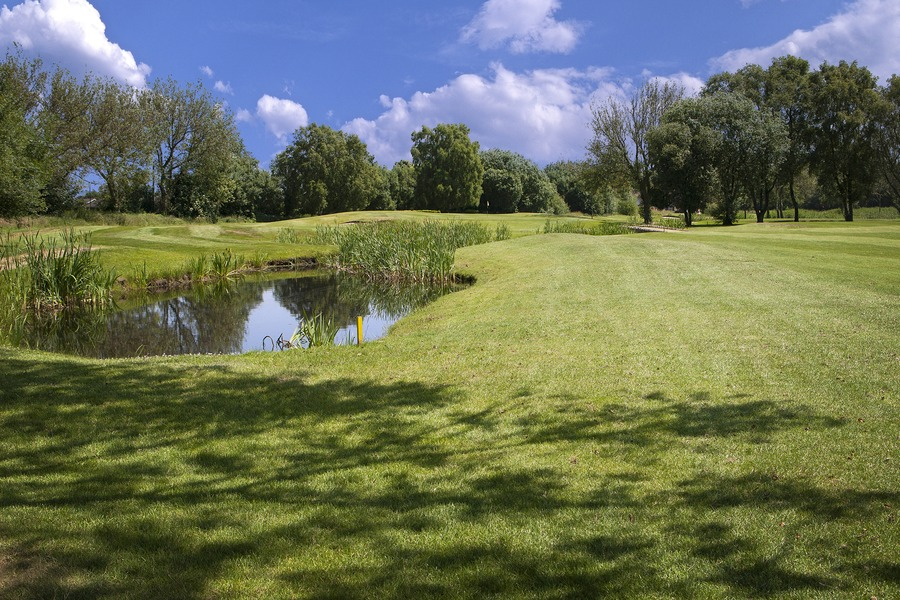
The course at Blackley

The award-winning Blackley Golf Club has occupied its present site close to the M60 motorway since 1937. The club celebrated its centenary in 2007, and a new clubhouse opened in 2009. The clubhouse offers use for wedding receptions and private hire. There is a golf shop, open to club members and the public.

The course's green is separated by fields from the motorway. A public footpath runs along the perimeter.

Blackley Cricket Club

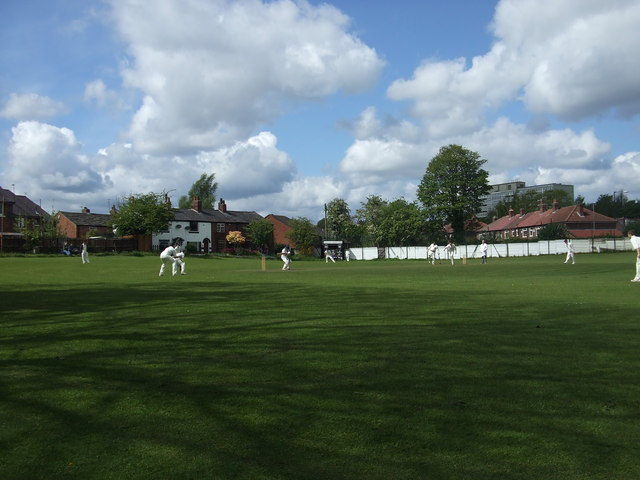
Crab Lane cricket ground in Blackley

Blackley Cricket Club currently plays in the Greater Manchester Cricket League. The club is located on Crab Lane. It won the cricket league title for Greater Manchester in 2009.

== Notable people ==
(either born in Blackley, or resident of Blackley)

- Hasney Aljofree (b. 1978), Swindon Town footballer
- John Bradford (1510–1555), Protestant martyr
- Roger Byrne (1929–1958), captain of Manchester United, and one of eight players who died in the Munich air disaster
- Stephen Bywater (b. 1981), professional footballer
- Howard Davies (b. 1951), economist and author: current Chairman of the Royal Bank of Scotland and former director of the London School of Economics
- David Heyes (b. 1946), Labour politician: former Labour MP for Ashton-under-Lyne
- Bernard Hill (1944–2024), actor of film, stage and television
- Jon Macken (b. 1977), former Manchester United and Manchester City footballer
- Bernard Manning (1930–2007), comedian
- Wilf McGuinness (b. 1937), former Manchester United player and manager
- Joe McIntyre (b. 1971), former professional footballer
- John Monks (b. 1945), Baron Monks of Blackley: Member of the House of Lords. Former General Secretary, TUC
- Northside singer, Warren "Dermo" Dermody
- Malcolm Roberts (1944–2003), musician, entertainer and Eurovision contestant.
- Vini Reilly (b. 1953), musician: The Durutti Column
- Peter Townley (b. 1955), Church of England Archdeacon – former Archdeacon of Pontefract

== See also ==
- Blackley Cemetery
- Blackley Jewish Cemetery
- Listed buildings in Manchester-M9
