= Church of St Peter, Blackley =

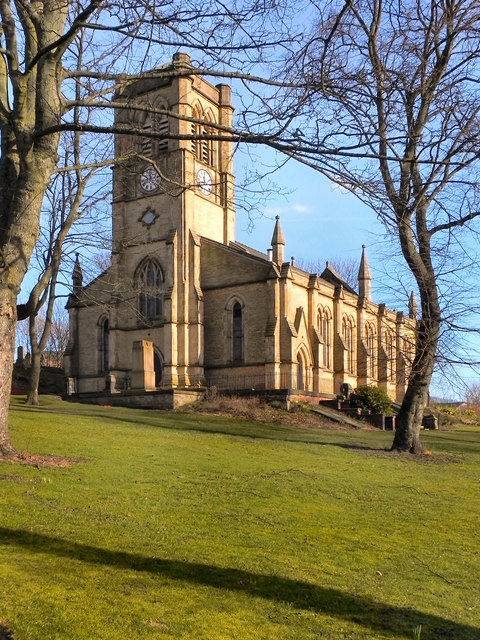
- Church of St Peter

- Location in Manchester
- 53.5235°N 2.218°W
- OS grid reference: SD 85645 02998
- Location: Blackley, Greater Manchester
- Country: England
- Denomination: Church of England
- Churchmanship: Central

History
- Status: Parish church
- Dedication: St Peter
- Dedicated: 1844

Architecture
- Functional status: Active
- Heritage designation: Grade II*
- Architect: E. H. Shellard
- Architectural type: Parish church
- Style: Gothic Revival architecture

The Church of St Peter is a Gothic Revival church on Old Market Street in Blackley, a suburban area of Manchester, England. It was built in 1844 to a design by the ecclesiastical architect E. H. Shellard. It was a Commissioners' church, erected at a cost of £3,162. The church is particularly notable for its almost completely intact interior. It was designated a Grade II* listed building on 20 June 1988.

The church is of "coursed sandstone rubble with ashlar dressings". The nave has buttresses and "clumsy" pinnacles and ends in a "blunt" west tower. The interior is aisled and "particularly impressive for its complete (nineteenth century) interior with the extremely unusual survival of all the fine boxes and other pews".

The churchyard contains the war graves of ten service personnel of World War I and seven of World War II.

== See also ==
- Grade II* listed buildings in Greater Manchester
- Listed buildings in Manchester-M9
