= Heaton Park =

Public park in Manchester, England

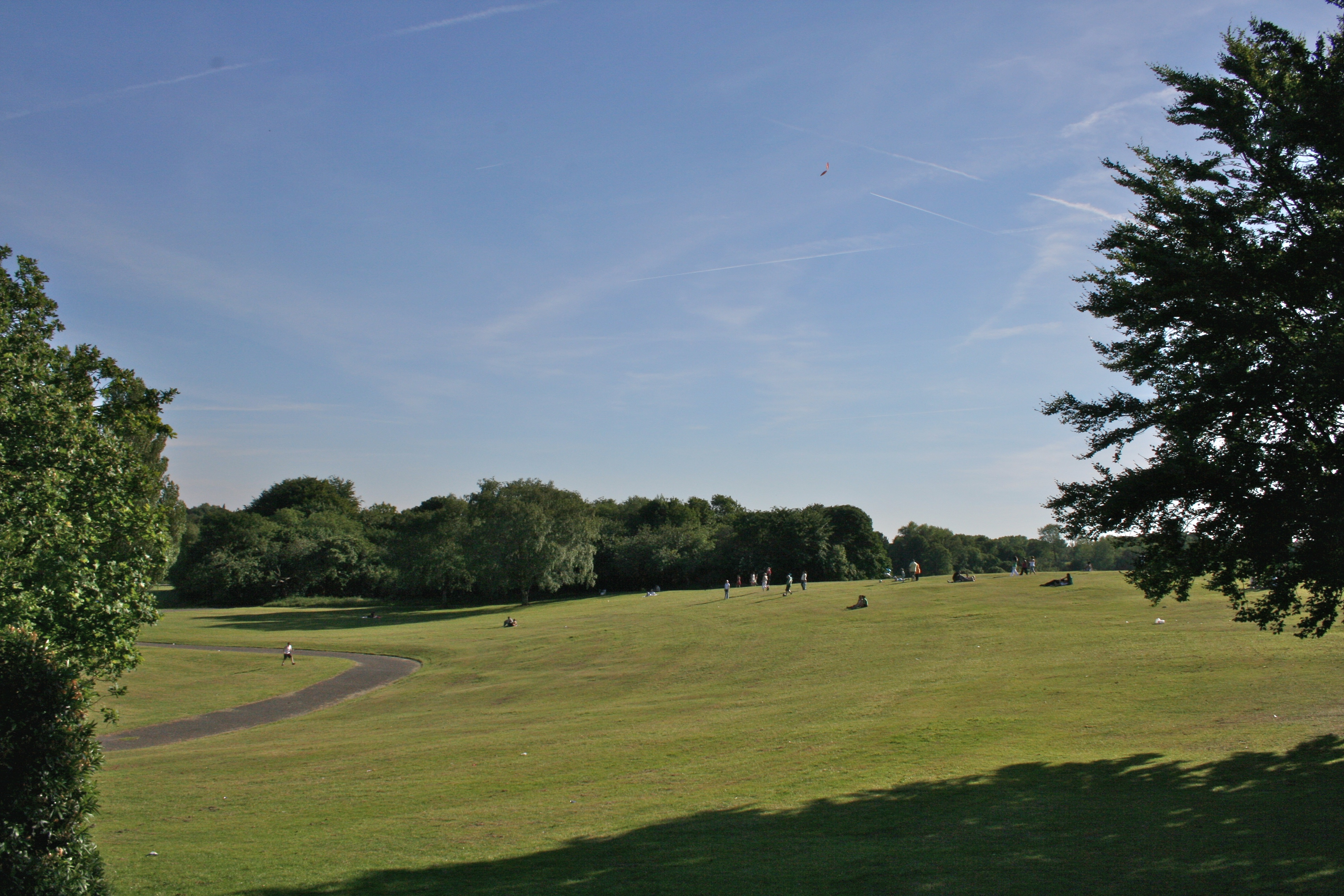
- Heaton Park, Manchester
- Interactive map of Heaton Park
- Type: Urban Park
- Location: Higher Blackley, Manchester, England
- Coordinates: 53.5347°N 2.2561°W
- Area: 600–650 acres (240–260 ha)
- Created: 1902
- Operator: Manchester City Council
- Status: Open year round
- Public transit: Heaton Park Metrolink station
- Website: Official website

National Register of Historic Parks and Gardens
- Official name: Heaton Park
- Designated: 20 February 1986
- Reference no.: 1000854

Heaton Park is a public park in Higher Blackley, Manchester, Greater Manchester, England, covering an area of over 600 acres (242.8 ha). The park includes the grounds of a Grade I listed, neoclassical 18th century country house, Heaton Hall. The hall, remodelled by James Wyatt in 1772, is now only open to the public on an occasional basis as a museum and events venue. It is the biggest park in Greater Manchester, and also one of the largest municipal parks in Europe.

Heaton Park was sold to Manchester City Council in 1902 by the 5th Earl of Wilton. It has one of the United Kingdom's few concrete towers, the Heaton Park BT Tower.

The park was renovated as part of a millennium project partnership between the Heritage Lottery Fund and Manchester City Council at a cost of over £10 million. It contains an 18-hole golf course, a boating lake, an animal farm, a pitch and putt course, a golf driving range, woodlands, ornamental gardens, an observatory, an adventure playground, a Papal monument and a volunteer-run tram system and museum, and is listed Grade II by Historic England. It has the only flat green bowling greens in Manchester, built for the 2002 Commonwealth Games.

== Toponymy ==
The park takes its name from the local area of Great Heaton. Heaton is derived from Old English heah 'high' + tun 'enclosure' or 'settlement'.

== History ==
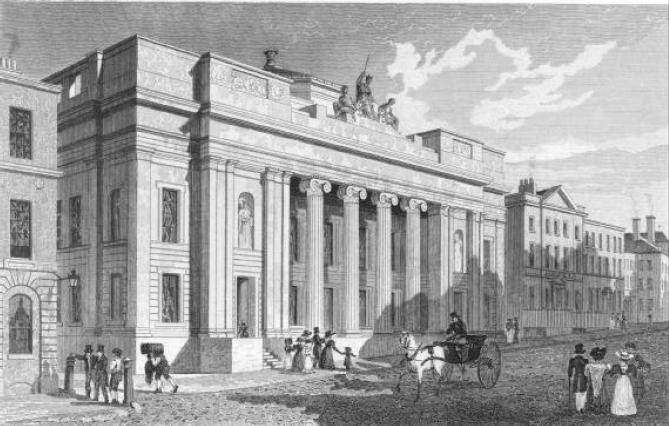
Manchester Old Town Hall, King Street

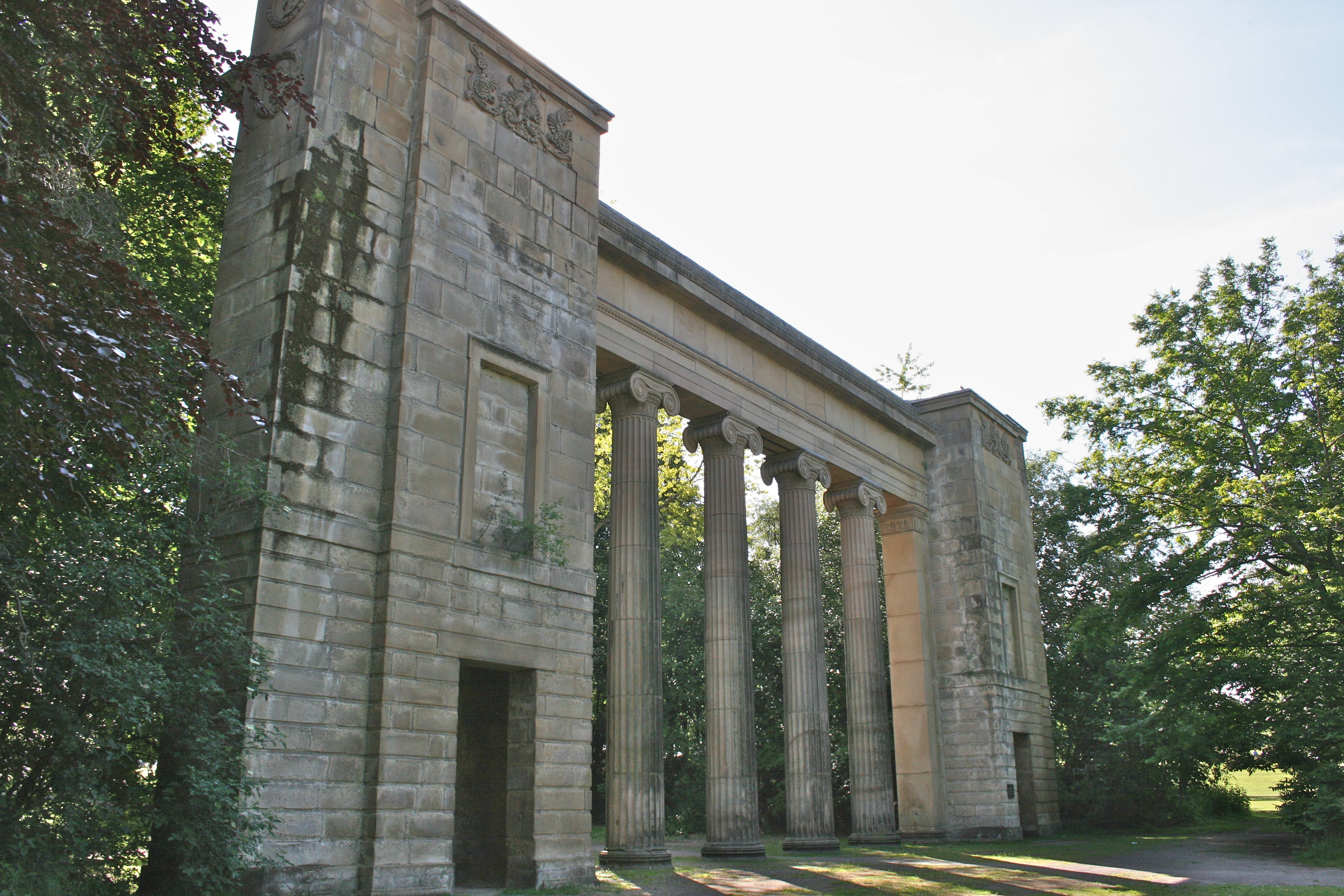
Old Town Hall Colonnade

Heaton Hall had been owned by the Holland family since the Middle Ages. In 1684, when Sir John Egerton, 3rd Baronet of Wilton, married Elizabeth Holland, the hall came to the Egerton family. In 1772, Sir Thomas Egerton, 7th Baronet (later the 1st Earl of Wilton), commissioned the fashionable architect James Wyatt to design a new home for his young family. Although Wyatt had already established a reputation for himself as an innovative architect, he was only 26 years old and Heaton Hall was his first country house commission. Wyatt's neo-classical masterpiece was built in phases and was mostly completed by 1789.

The park was originally laid out by William Emes in the style of Capability Brown. It has long been used for public events such as Heaton Park races, which were established by the second Earl in 1827. The races were run on a course around the park which included the site of the present day boating lake until 1839 when they moved to Aintree near Liverpool, now the venue for the Grand National. During the 19th century when the railway to Bury was being laid, it stopped short of Heaton Park, as Lord Wilton was not prepared to see his estate disfigured by a railway. As a compromise the line was run under the estate in a tunnel and a railway station opened adjacent to the Whittaker Lane/Bury Old Road entrance in 1879 (now Heaton Park Metrolink station). Consequently, the decision by Lord Wilton to put the hall and park up for sale was greeted with dismay, especially when it became known that the site was being eyed by a property developer. A pressure group was formed to persuade Manchester City Council to purchase it as a museum and municipal park. Alderman Fletcher Moss, a prominent antiquarian was a notable influence in this movement. The park was purchased and opened to the public in 1902. Unfortunately, the council was not prepared to purchase the contents of the hall, so the furniture and paintings were sold by auction. The hall was considered by the council to be of little architectural or historical significance and the saloon was initially used as a tea-room.

During the First World War, the park was used as a training camp for the Pals battalions of the Manchester Regiment, whilst Heaton Hall became a military hospital.

In the Second World War, the park was a camp for the Royal Air Force, where 133,516 aircrew were trained. The park was home to a barrage balloon anchorage and an anti-aircraft emplacement. Two "prefab" housing estates and an infants school were built in the south of the park, the houses providing much-needed homes until they were demolished in the 1960s. The school building was used by Manchester City Council until 2012, when it was demolished.

== Heaton Hall ==
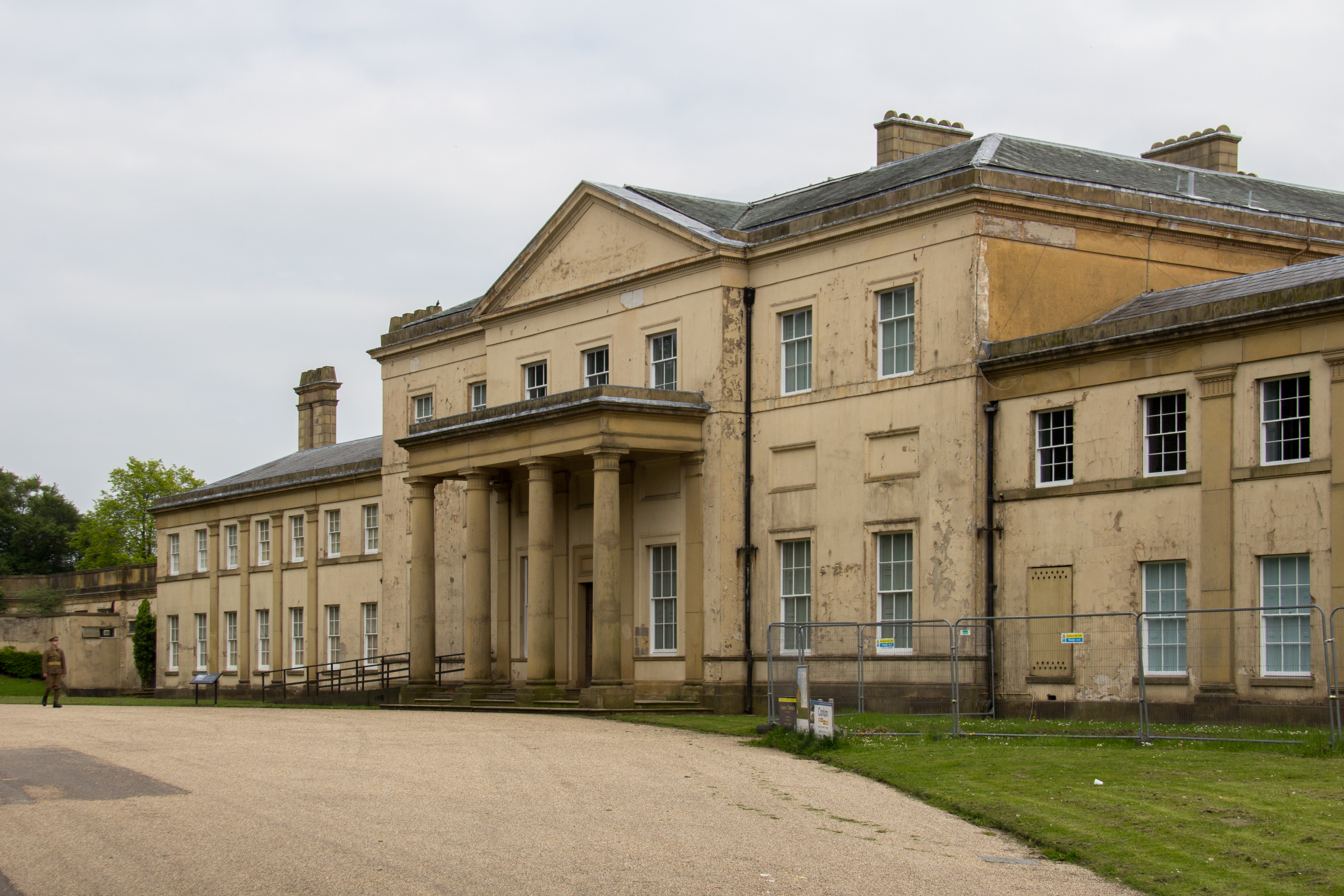
Heaton Hall

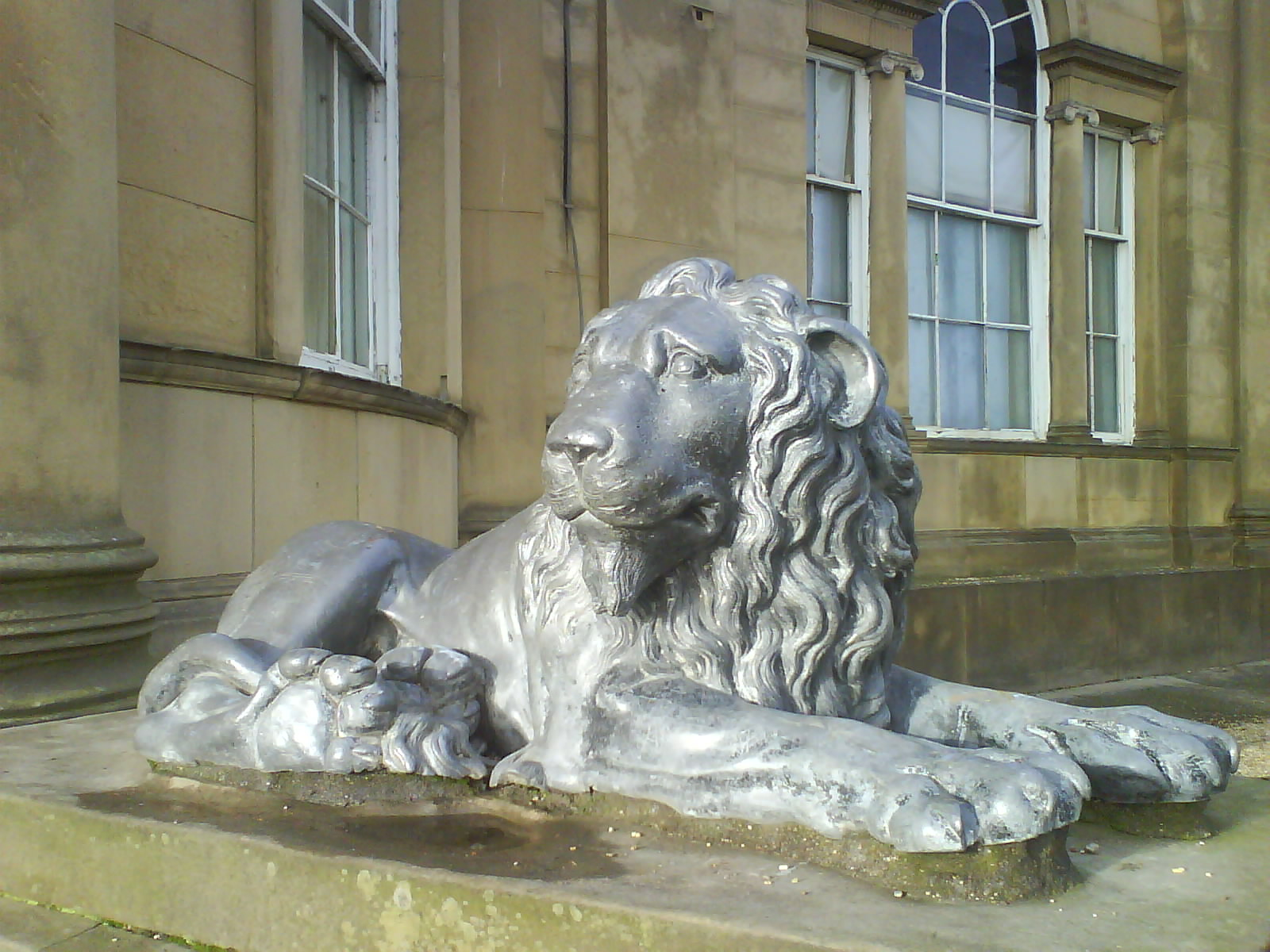
Statue of a lion at the south entrance

The hall has been a Grade I Listed Building since 1952 and has been called "the finest house of its period in Lancashire". It is built of sandstone and stuccoed brick, in a traditional Palladian design with the entrance on the north side and the facade on the south. The landscaping was designed to make the most of the uninterrupted views of the rolling hills across to the Pennines. A feature of this was the ha-ha, used to keep the grazing animals, so important to the landscaping, away from the formal lawns, with a barrier that was all-but invisible from the house.

The state rooms include the Library, the Music Room, Dining Room and upstairs, a rather rare Etruscan Room. The rooms of the hall were exquisitely finished by the finest artists and craftsmen of the period, with most of the furnishings and mahogany doors being made by Gillow's of Lancashire. Most of the decorative paintings, the Pompeiian Cupola Room and the case for the 18th century chamber organ built by Samuel Green in 1790, were the work of Italian artist, Biagio Rebecca. The organ fills one wall of the Music Room. The ornate plasterwork was created by the firm of Joseph Rose II of York.

There are 13 rooms occasionally open to the public in the central core and east wing. Manchester City Galleries restored the decorative detail in the 1980s and early 1990s. The ground floor rooms on the north east front have been converted to an expansive space that houses temporary exhibitions. The first floor rooms include the Cupola which was originally Lady Egerton's dressing room. The room was styled in the 1770s "Pompeiian" style with mirrored walls and a domed ceiling — there are only three such rooms left in Britain.

The library was remodelled by Lewis Wyatt in the 1820s. Heaton Hall's collections are managed by Manchester Galleries. The hall is currently (February 2017) listed on Historic England's Heritage at Risk register.

== Landmarks and features ==
=== Temple ===
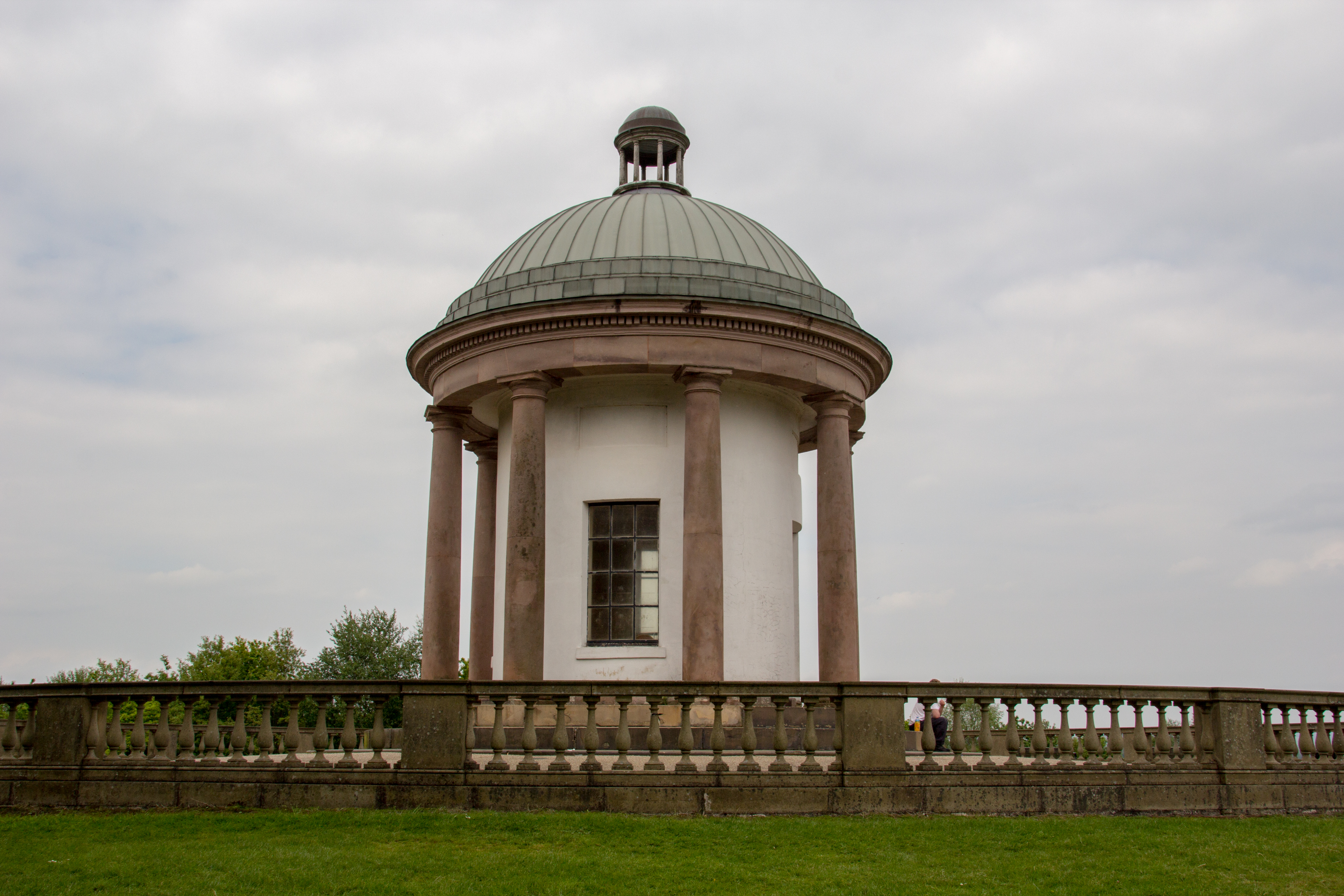
Temple

Designed by James Wyatt in 1800 for Thomas Egerton, 1st Earl of Wilton, the ornamental temple is a simple, small rotunda of Tuscan columns with a domed roof and lantern. This Grade II listed building stands on the highest point of the city of Manchester giving views across the golf course, which was originally the deer park. It has its own fireplace and is thought to have been used as an observatory by the Earl who is known to have owned a telescope bought from Dollond's of London. The cost of the telescope was £18.5s.0d (£18.25) – the same amount earned in a year by the Earl's under-butler. The temple has recently been enclosed by a stone balustrade and gravelled path and is used as a summer studio for artists, and for astronomy sessions.

=== Dower House ===
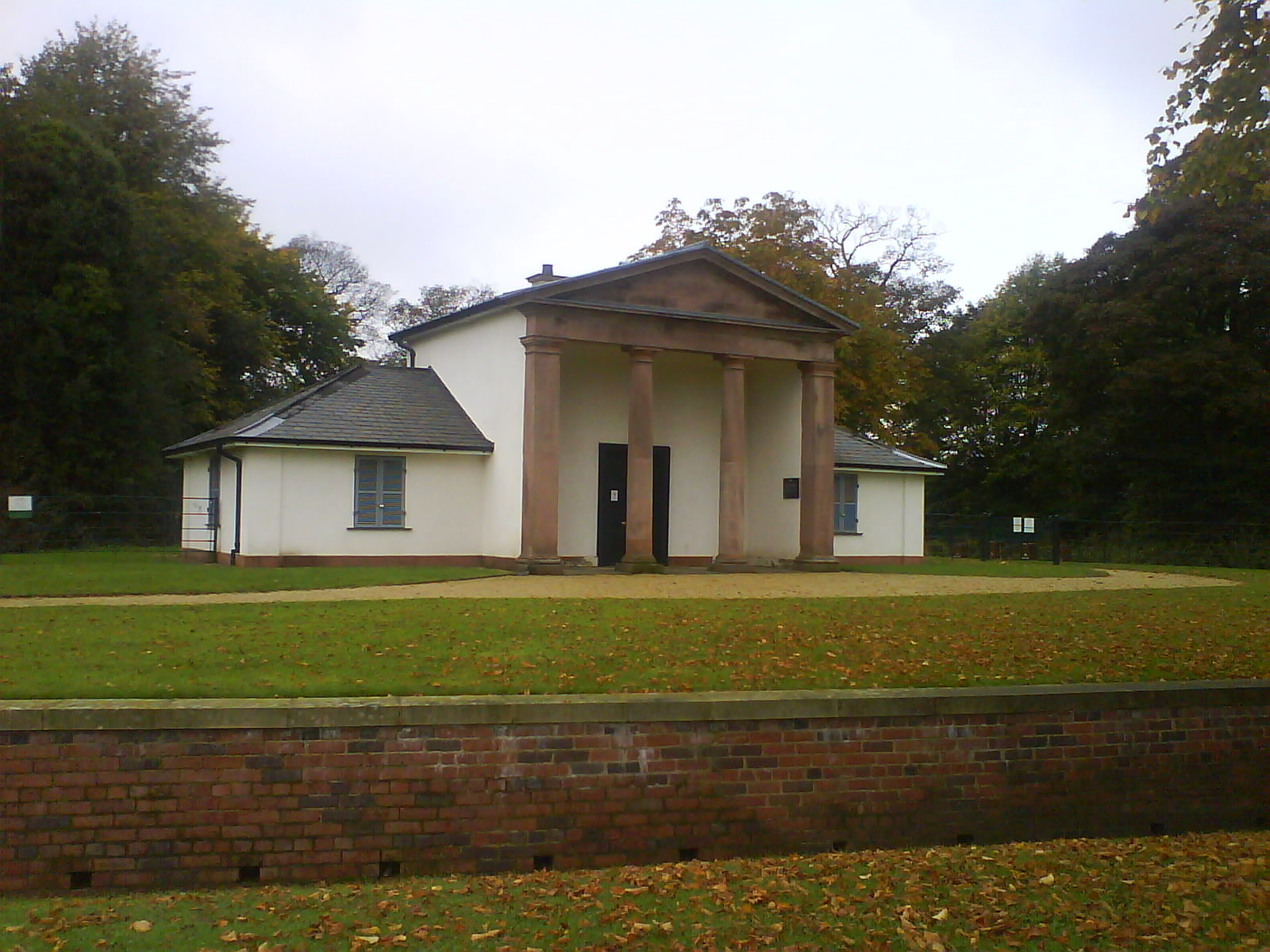
Dower House and ha-ha

The Dower House was a plain brick building that was transformed with a decorative columned façade in 1803. The ha-ha in front of the house stopped the cattle from grazing on the formal lawns, making a barrier which cannot be seen from the house. In 2004 the house became the home of the Manchester and District Beekeepers' Association and is furnished with an observation hive, equipment and displays with an apiary in the garden behind the house.

=== Smithy Lodge ===
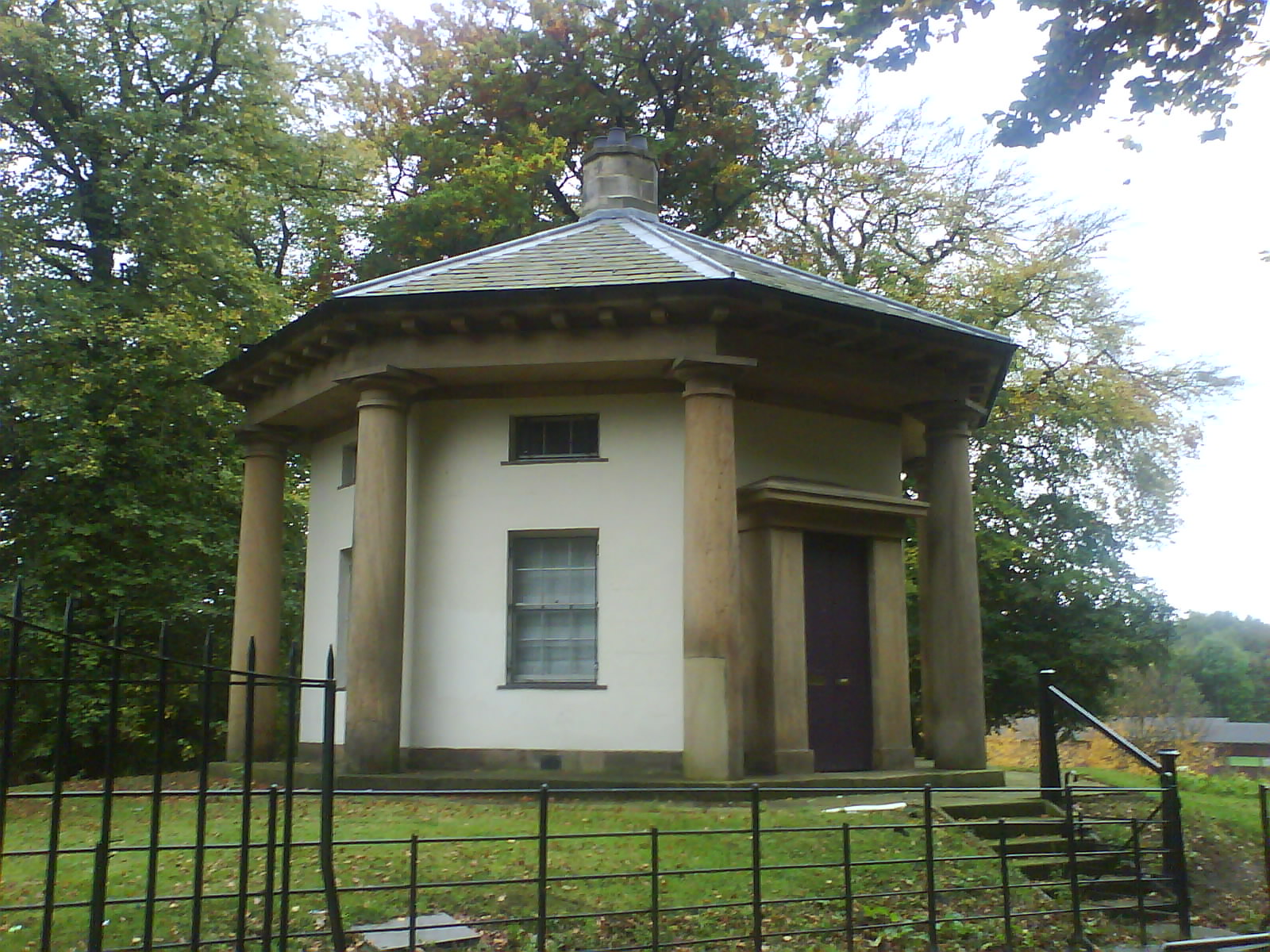
Smithy Lodge

This "pepperpot" building located at the east entrance to the park, now on Middleton Road, was designed by Lewis Wyatt for the 1st Earl of Wilton in 1806. It was built in an unusual octagonal shape as a cottage to be viewed from the house in a romantic, rural setting, as well as being a home for the lodge keeper. The name comes from a blacksmith's forge which was located nearby on Middleton Road. The lodge was fully restored with a grant from the Lottery Heritage fund in the late 1990s and is now rented out to the public as short stay accommodation.

=== Grand Lodge ===
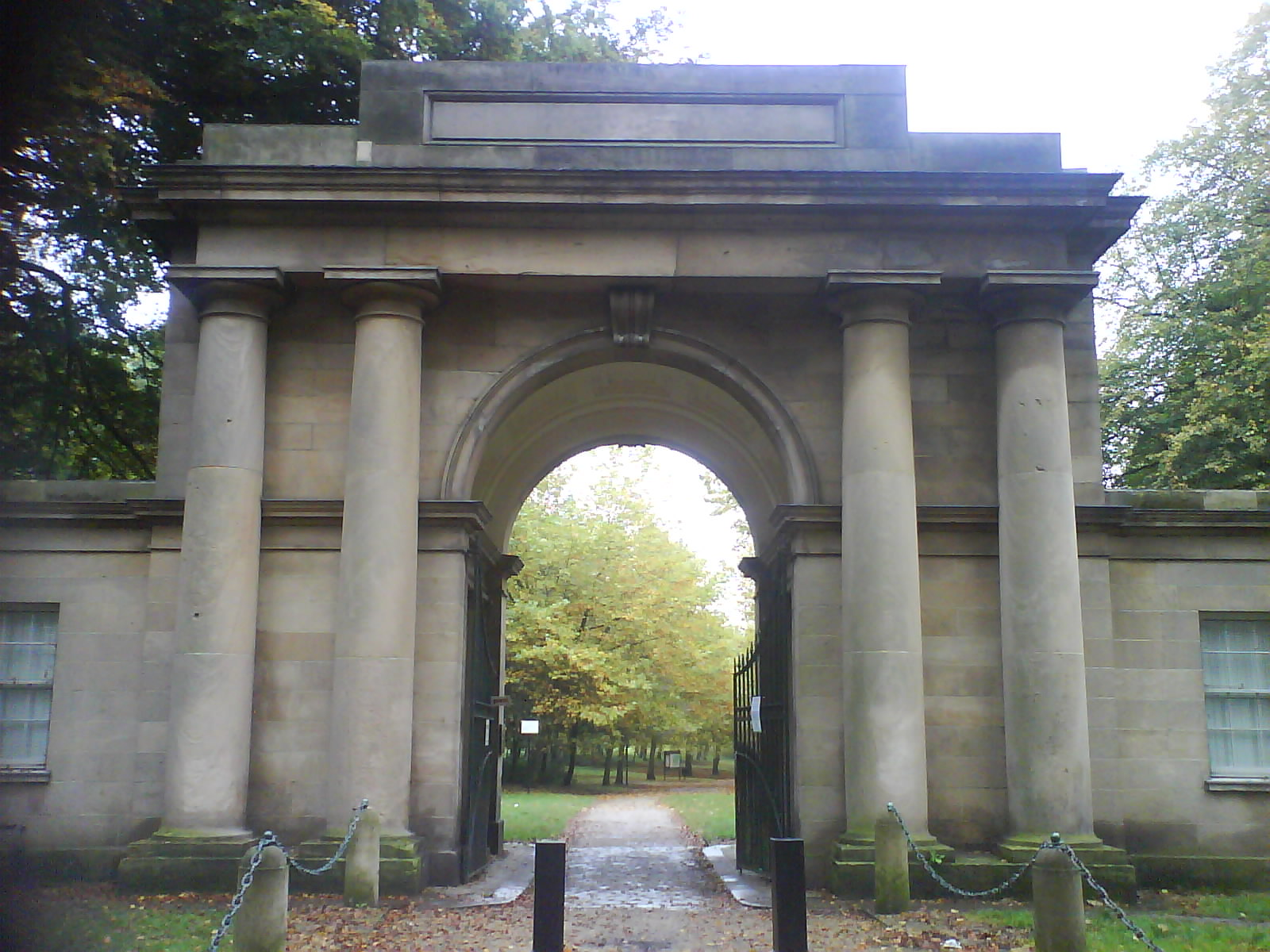
Grand Lodge

Commissioned in 1807 by Sir Thomas Egerton, the Grand Lodge was designed by Lewis Wyatt as an impressive main entrance to the park from the south. The lodge is built of ashlar sandstone as a large triumphal arch and originally led onto one of the longest carriage drives to the house. It has two floors of accommodation, cellars under the west wing and an attic over the arch. The construction of the lodge completed the enclosure of the park by a 10-foot (3.0 m) high boundary wall. It was refurbished as part of the millennium project and is now rented out to the public as short stay accommodation. There is a memorial plaque here dedicated to the memory of the Manchester Pals who trained in the park in 1914.

=== Western pleasure grounds ===
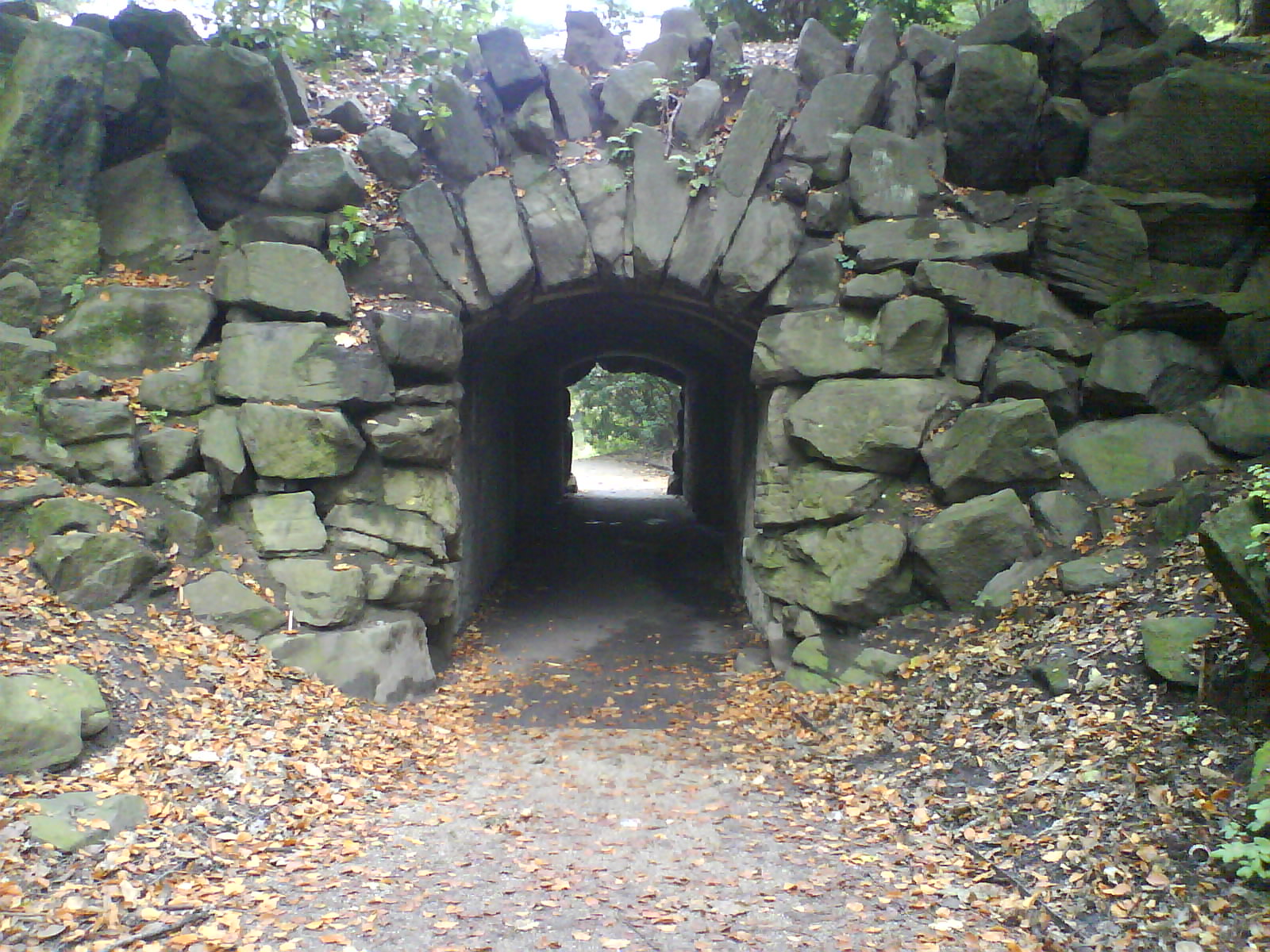
The tunnel

These ornamental gardens were probably laid out in the early 19th century as a peaceful retreat for the family. The gardens have recently been returned to their original design with pools, summerhouses and plants appropriate to the period. A tunnel leads from the flowergarden to the dell and carries a causeway at high level across the gardens to allow the cattle, from the fields to the south of the garden, to be taken to the farm for milking without entering the gardens. The tunnel entrance is faced with large stones to give it the appearance of a natural cave.

=== Orangery ===
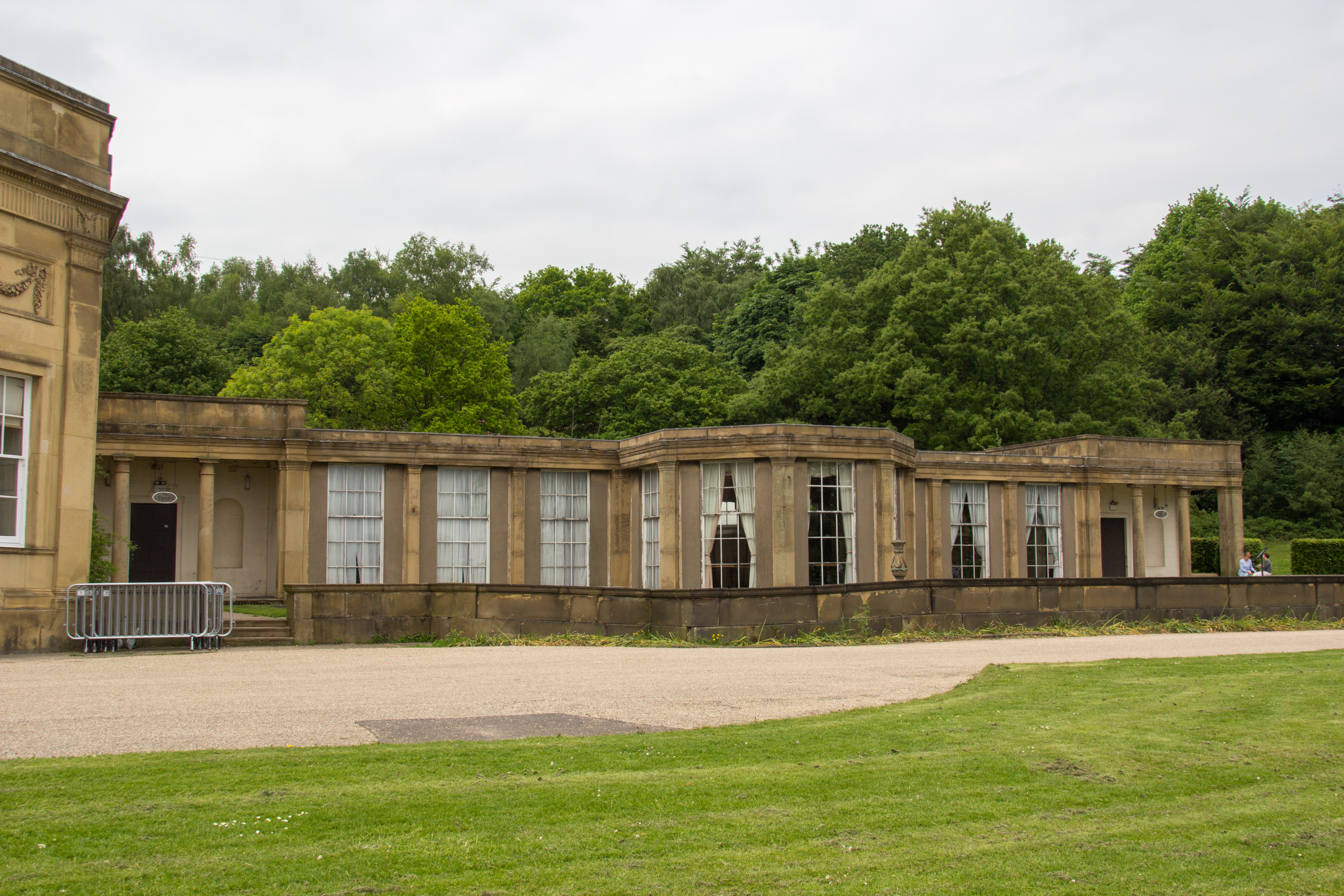
Orangery

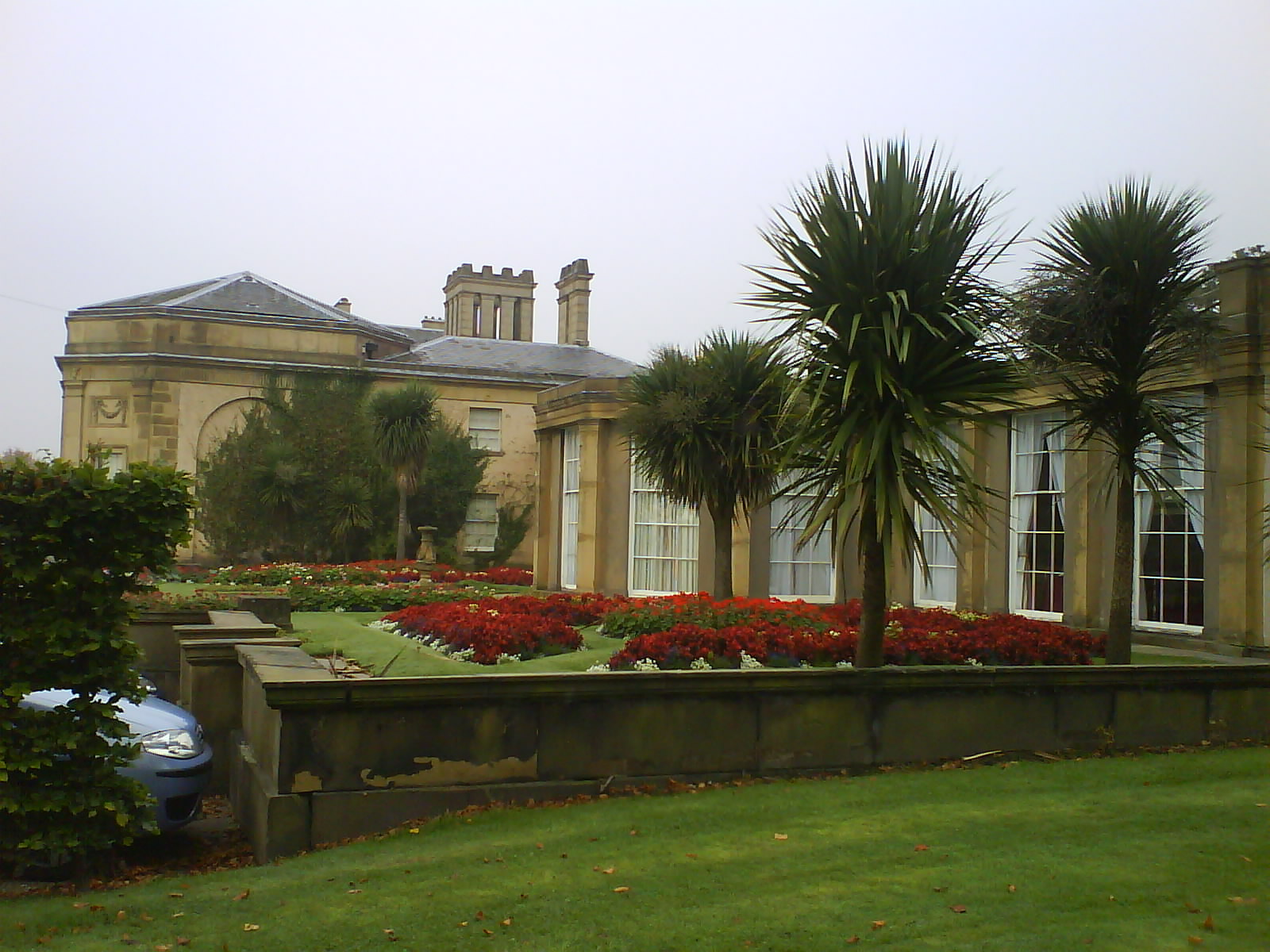
Orangery and gardens

The orangery was added to the house by the 2nd Earl of Wilton around 1823. It was probably designed by Lewis Wyatt as it is similar to his orangeries at Tatton Park and Belton House. It was probably built for the wife of the 2nd Earl, Lady Mary Stanley, who was a keen botanist. It was designed with a domed, glazed roof, fronted by a formal garden with two large copies of the Borghese Vase. The ornate glass roof was removed, to be replaced with a flat roof after Manchester City Council purchased the park in 1902. The orangery is now a function and conference venue, run by Manchester City Council's Hospitality and Trading Service.

=== Boating lake ===
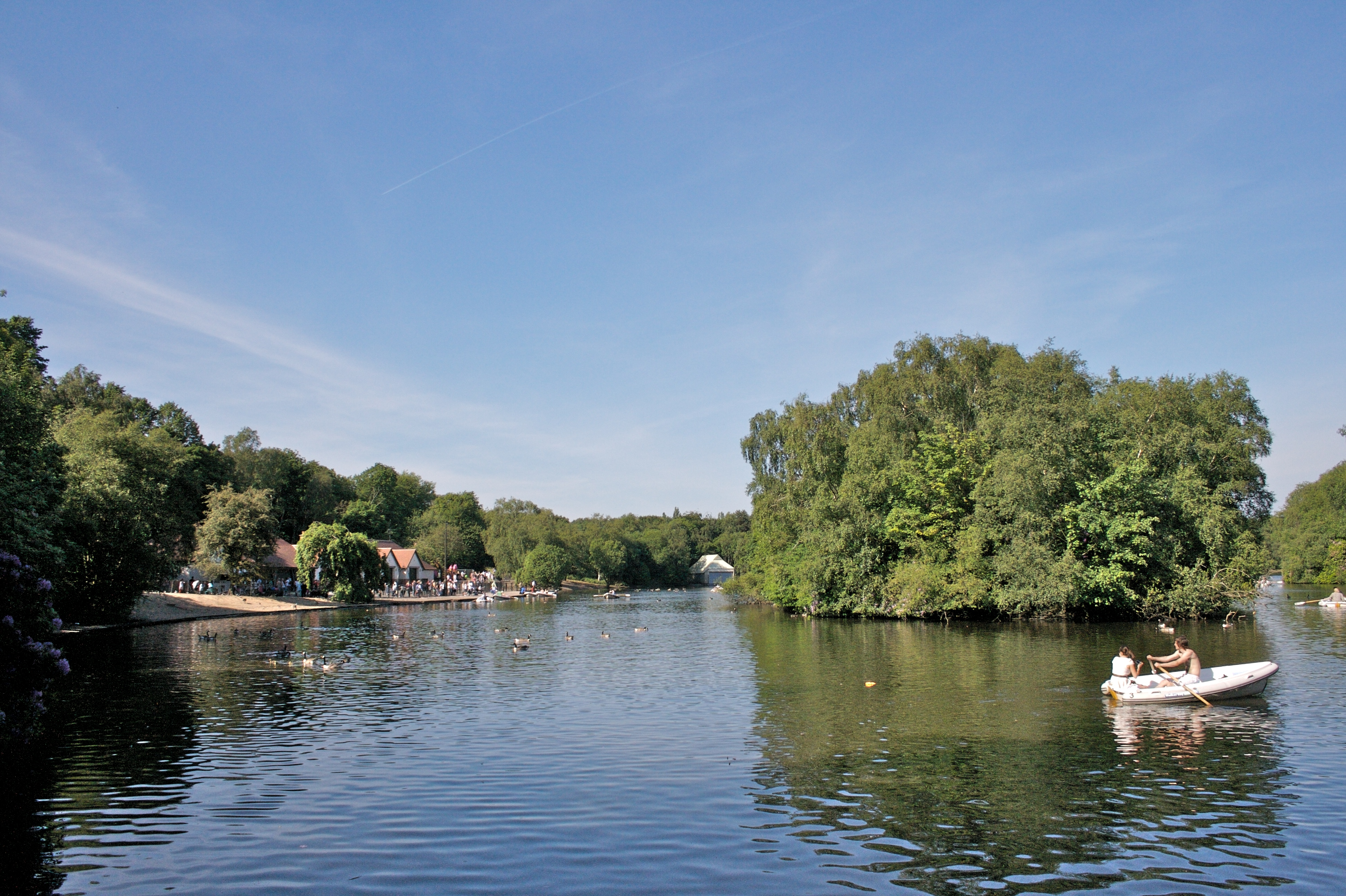
The boating lake

The 12-acre (4.9 ha) boating lake was constructed between 1908 and 1912 by previously unemployed men using only shovels and hand-pulled trucks. The lake, which is overlooked by the Lakeside Cafe, has three islands and is home to large numbers of ornamental birds and wildfowl including geese, ducks, swans and fantail doves. There are rowing boats for hire during the summer months. The lake is noted for its excellent carp fishing and is also stocked with roach, rudd, bream, tench and chub. Fishing rights to all the waters in the park are held by the King William IV Angling Society.

=== Colonnade ===
An interesting structure in the park is the Colonnade, which once formed the front of old Manchester Town Hall in King Street. When that building was scheduled for demolition a successful campaign to save the façade resulted in the colonnade being re-assembled in the park at the end of the boating lake.

=== Walled Garden and Horticultural Centre ===
The 18th century Walled Garden was the Earl of Wilton's kitchen garden supplying fruit and vegetables for the estate. The walls provide a warm microclimate for crop cultivation and support for climbing plants. The Horticultural Centre staff now grow plants for the city's displays and for sale to the public. There are also demonstration gardens open to the public during the summer and a sensory garden. "The Friends of Heaton Park", a group formed in 1992 to promote an interest in the care of the park and to act as a communication link between the park users and the Heaton Park management team, are based at the centre.

=== Farm Centre, Stables Cafe and Animal Centre ===
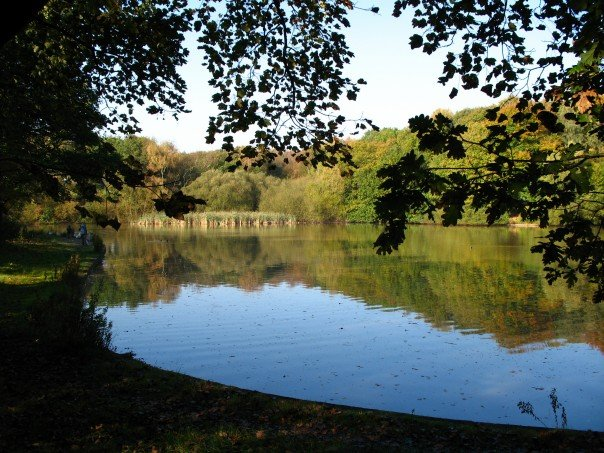
Hazlitt Wood Pond

The farm centre was originally built as a stable block for Sir Thomas Egerton. It was designed by Samuel Wyatt and built between 1777 and 1789. It now houses the Stables Cafe and is also the administrative centre for the park. The Animal Centre is housed behind the stables in the area that was Home Farm, on the site of the 19th century glasshouse range where exotic foods and flowers were grown for the family. The Animal Centre was built in 2003–04 to replace the old Pets' Corner and houses goats, cattle, pigs, donkeys, Hebridean sheep, alpacas and Kune Kune pigs plus small pets.

=== Hazlitt Wood Pond ===
Hazlitt Wood Pond is located in Hazlitt Wood to the far north of the park. This area of the park can only be reached on foot and hence remains quiet and secluded.

== Former landmarks ==
=== The Runner ===
A bronze statue of an athlete, called The Runner, was installed in the park in 1960. It was created by John Longden, and modelled on himself. It was presented to the people of Manchester in 1959 by Longden's brother, Edward, who had previously served as the President of the Institute of British Foundrymen. Manchester City Council decided to place the statue in Heaton Park. It remained in the park until its theft in October 1968.

== Heaton Park Tramway ==
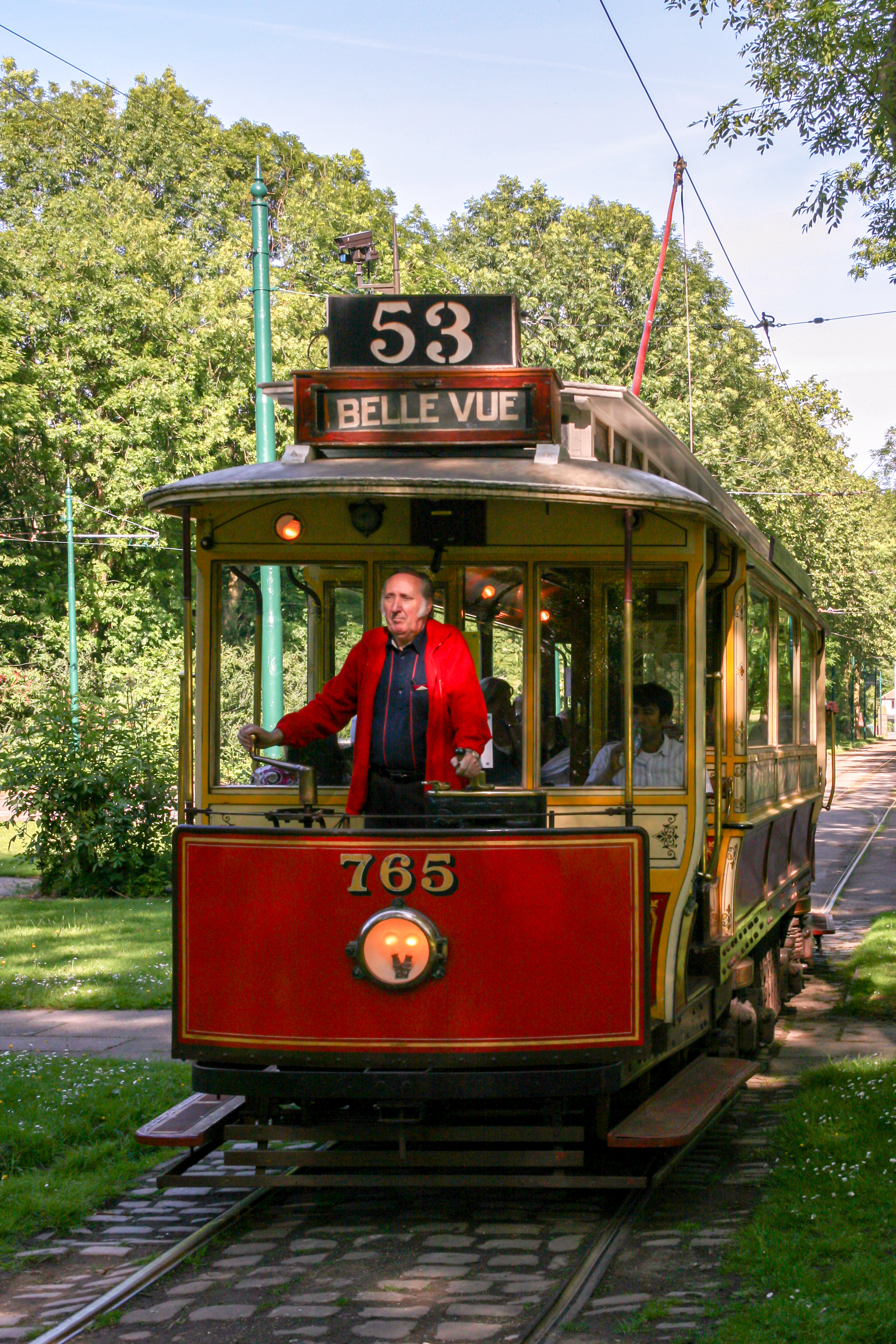
Tram number 765 in Heaton Park

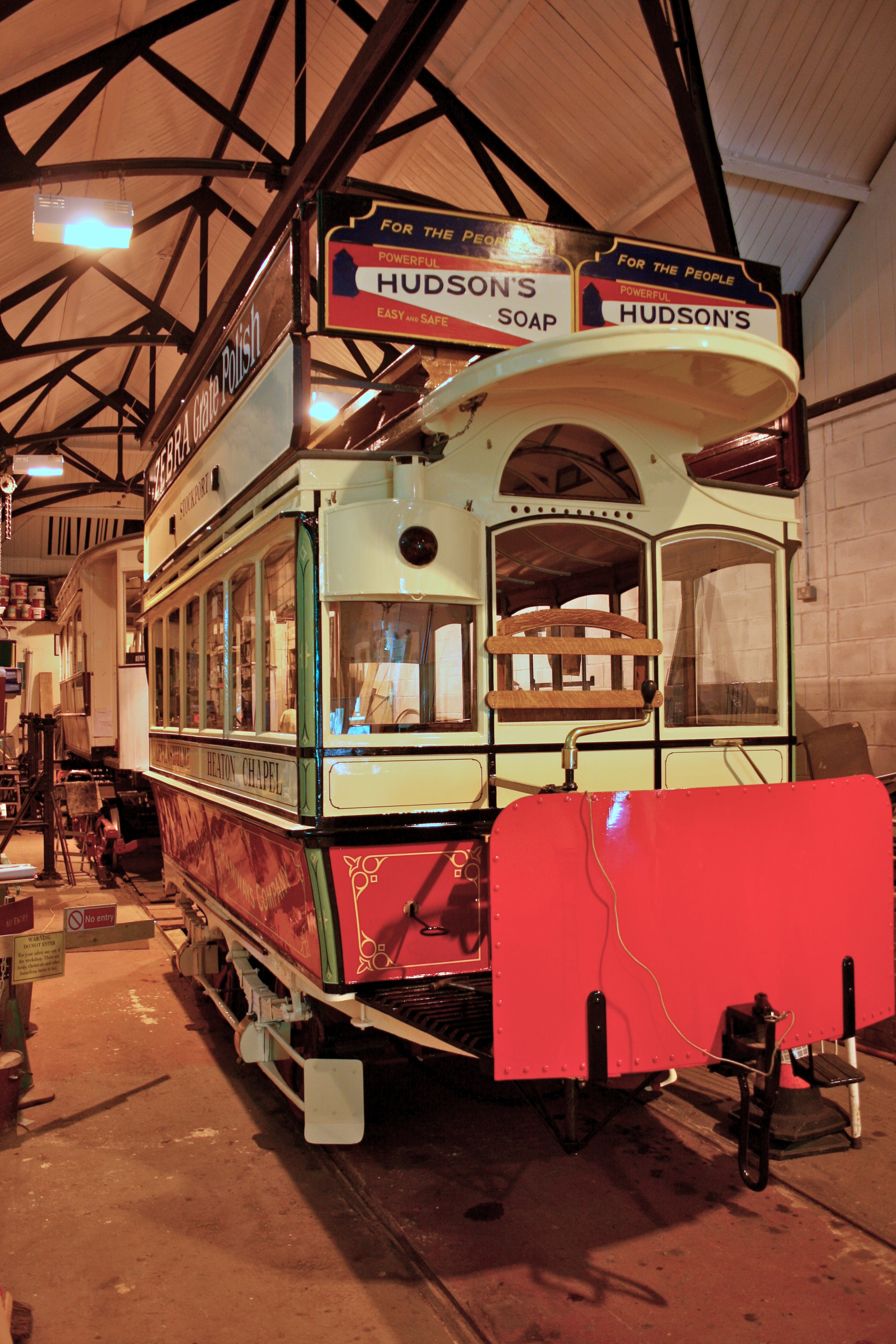
Horse-drawn tram in Heaton Park

Shortly after the Heaton Park was bought by Manchester Corporation the tramway was extended into the park and the first tram arrived on 31 May 1903, bringing visitors from Manchester. By 1934 buses were taking over from trams and the tramway was disconnected from the main system and covered in tarmac for use by buses.

In the 1970s the Manchester Transport Museum Society were seeking a route to run their restored heritage tram, 765, and Heaton Park was an obvious candidate. The initial idea, to construct a new tramway from Grand Lodge to Heaton Hall, was considered too expensive, as it would require remedial works to carry it across the railway tunnel. Therefore, a new scheme was proposed to open up the old Manchester Corporation Tramways spur from Middleton Road to the old tram shelter some 300 yards (270 m) inside the park.

The work was completed in 1979 and the Heaton Park Tramway was officially opened on 28 March 1980. The line has since been extended through the park to the boating lake where a second depot was built to house the expanded fleet of 14 trams.

== Heaton Park Golf Course ==
The municipal golf course is a championship standard golf course, built on the former deer park to the south of the hall with views across to the Pennines. Designed by five times Open Champion John Henry Taylor, it was opened to the public in 1912 and has been the venue for a number of professional and amateur events. The golf centre, which has its own private driving range used for teaching purposes, is located at the Smithy Lodge, entrance to Heaton Park. The 11th hole is played across water to a plateau green and was rated by Open Champion Henry Cotton as "the toughest par-3 in England". The course was voted the best municipal golf course in England in 2005.

== Events in the park ==
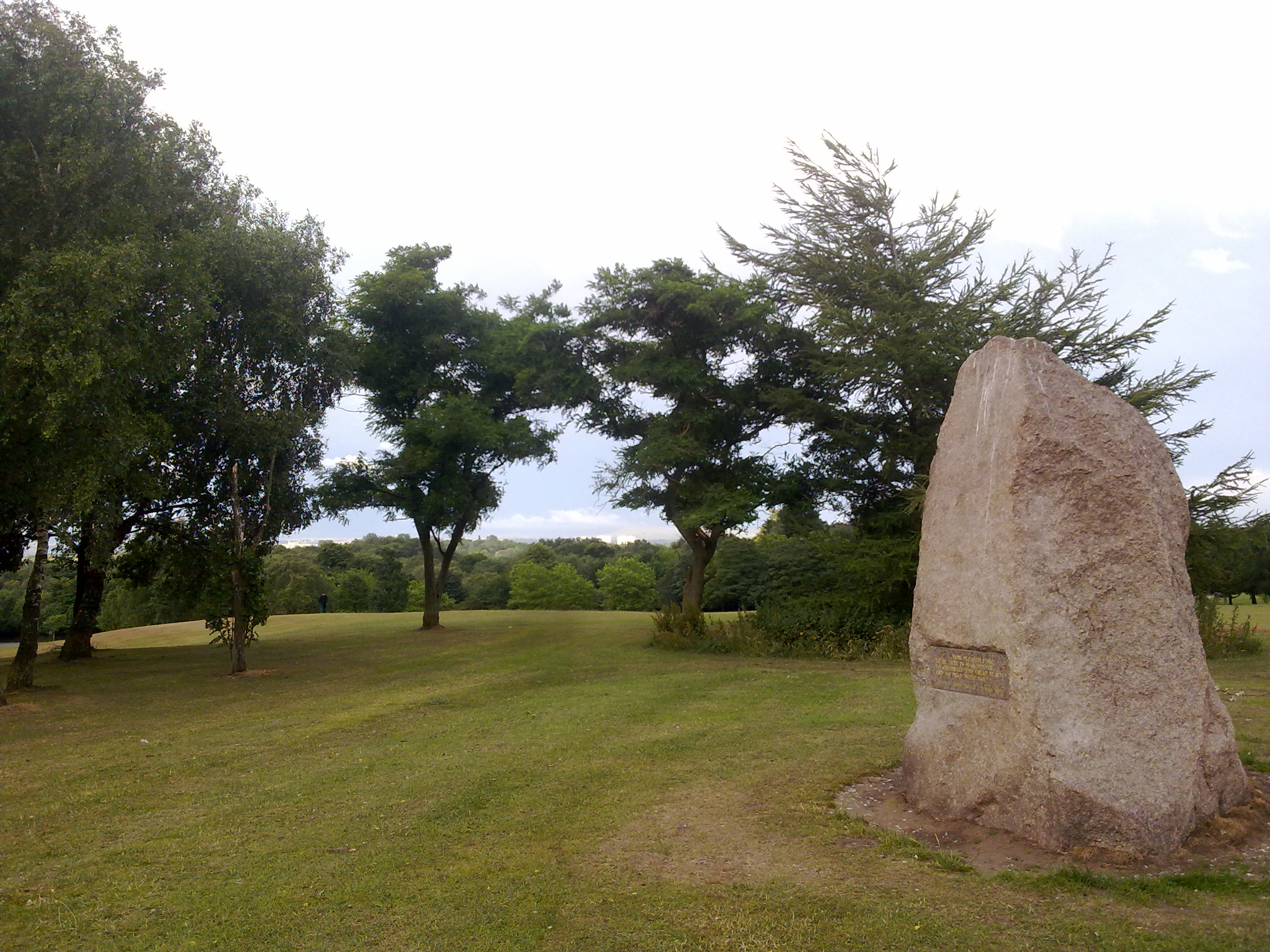
Monument commemorating the 1982 visit by Pope John Paul II to the park

On 31 May 1982 Pope John Paul II celebrated Mass in the park for over 100,000 people and ordained 12 new priests. This event is commemorated by the papal monument in the south-west of the park.

=== Music ===
In 1909, Italian tenor Enrico Caruso performed at the Free Trade Hall in Manchester. The concert was attended by William Grimshaw, a gramophone salesman from Prestwich and a few days later, he took his gramophone to Heaton Park and played recordings of the songs performed by Caruso to an assembled crowd of 40,000 people who, according to the Prestwich and Heaton Park Guardian, "remained as if spellbound from the moment of arrival to the close of the programme, which, it is hardly necessary to say, was intensely enjoyed." Caruso later wrote to Mr. Grimshaw to thank him for the way his voice had been reproduced, sending him a signed cartoon of himself. Grimshaw was the first person in Britain to give gramophone concerts in the open, an idea which soon spread across the country. The concerts were carried on for several seasons and as they grew in popularity, Grimshaw became known across Lancashire as the "Gramophone King".

Since the 1980s a number of open air rock concerts have been held in the park, headlined by popular bands of the day such as Travis and Supergrass. The park has been the venue for the BBC's "Proms in the Park" on a number of occasions.

Manchester band, Oasis, performed to a total audience of 210,000 over three nights in June 2009. In June 2012, Manchester band The Stone Roses played three sold-out shows at Heaton Park as part of their Reunion Tour. It was announced in February 2013 that Manchester's annual Parklife Weekender music festival will be held at Heaton Park for the foreseeable future.

Manchester band Courteeners played their biggest headline show to date at the park on 5 June 2015.

On 1 July 2016, the park hosted a concert and exhibition as part of the National Commemoration of the Centenary of the Battle of the Somme, which was centred on Manchester. An act of Remembrance at the Cenotaph in St Peter's Square, Manchester was followed by the National Commemorative Service in Manchester Cathedral. People were invited to make a commemorative tile, with the results laid as a path through the park. An evening concert at Heaton Park featured a national children's choir, archive film, dance, spoken word and Manchester's Hallé Orchestra. The Experience Field (where visitors could learn more about life on the home and western fronts in 1916) was located in and around Heaton Hall.

On 27 November 2019, Liam Gallagher announced he would be playing a show in the park on 12 June 2020. The Manchester-born singer's show sold out within 3 hours after being put on sale at 9:00 am on 29 November 2019. The concert was ultimately cancelled, owing to the COVID-19 pandemic.

==== Oasis Live '25 Reunion Tour ====
On 27 August 2024, Oasis announced that they would be reuniting for a tour, with Heaton Park being the venue for five concerts between 11 and 20 July 2025.

===== Gallagher Hill =====
Despite a large temporary steel fence erected by Manchester City Council to protect newly planted trees and livestock, thousands of ticketless fans gathered on the park’s south‑facing knoll—quickly nicknamed “Gallagher Hill”—to watch Oasis on giant screens.

On 19 July 2025, Liam Gallagher dedicated the performance of “Bring It On Down” to the fans on the hill, while Noel organised a live video feed of their celebrations onto the main stage’s screens and personally funded 1,000 limited‑edition commemorative T‑shirts for distribution there.

In the days following the final concert, Manchester City Council—supported by dozens of local volunteers—carried out a large‑scale clean‑up to remove litter, then re‑seeded worn patches, ensuring Gallagher Hill was restored for the public’s enjoyment.

=== Theatre ===
In recent years the park has hosted some open-air theatre productions. From 1998 Feelgood Theatre Productions performed open-air promenade productions many of which received Manchester Evening News Theatre Awards and the Horniman Award for outstanding service to theatre. Productions include: Blue Remembered Hills (Potter), The Wizard of Oz, The Wind in the Willows, The Three Musketeers, Arthur - King of the Britons, Dracula - The Blood Count, Shakespeare's A Midsummer Night's Dream and Macbeth. In 2016 Feelgood returned and performed the world premier of Whispers of Heaton (May and November) and Ghost Story of Heaton (October). Feelgood is now (2016) the official theatre partner for Heaton Park and hall and is planning a programme of theatre and music events. In 2005 there was a screening of Pulp Fiction with a film inspired set from the Fun Lovin' Criminals.

The Shakespeare's Globe Theatre performs open-air theatre annually with performances of Shakespeare's greatest works in 2008, 2009 and A Midsummer Night's Dream in June 2010.

=== Sport and culture ===
A 5 km (3.1 mi) run against the clock is organised by Parkrun on Saturday mornings.

There are often charity run events such as the 'Race for Life' and seasonal fairs are located near the Papal monument. There is a large bonfire and firework display held on 5 November (Guy Fawkes Night) each year.

In winter, Heaton Park is one of the venues hosting child and adult runners in the Manchester Area Cross Country League.

== See also ==
- Grade I listed buildings in Greater Manchester
- Grade II* listed buildings in Greater Manchester
- Listed buildings in Manchester-M25 (Manchester district)

== Gallery ==
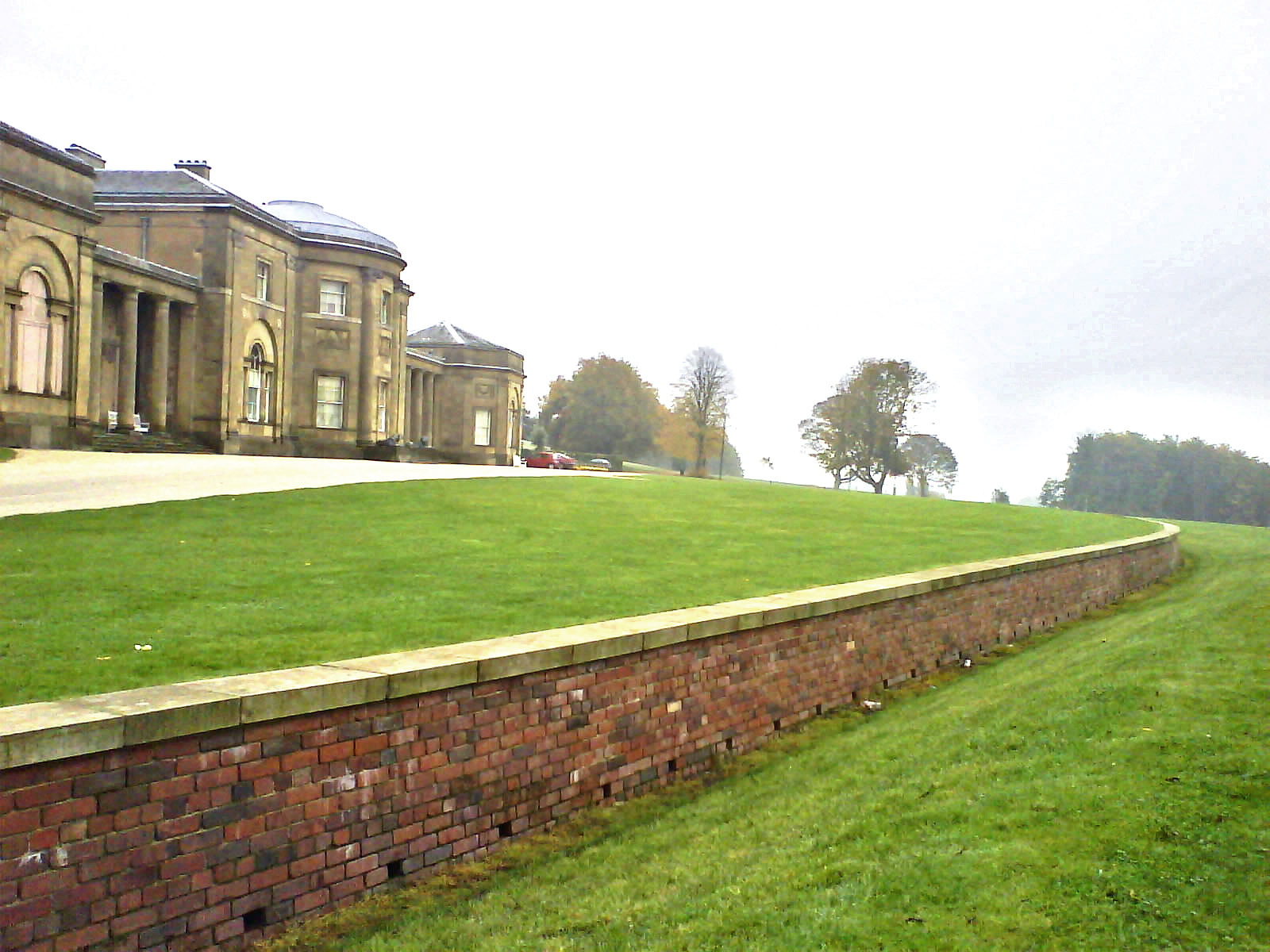
Heaton Hall and ha-ha

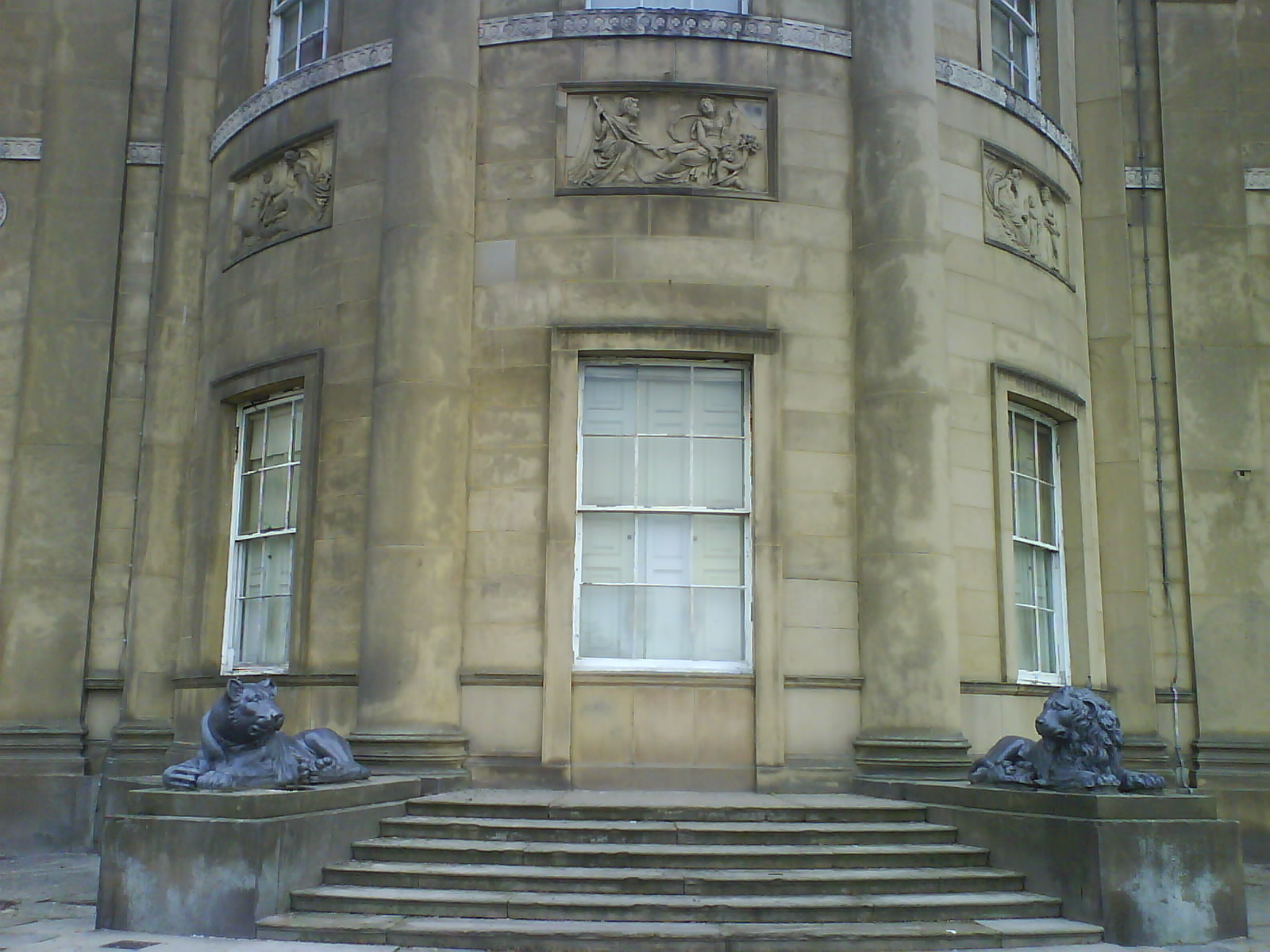
Lions guarding the south entrance

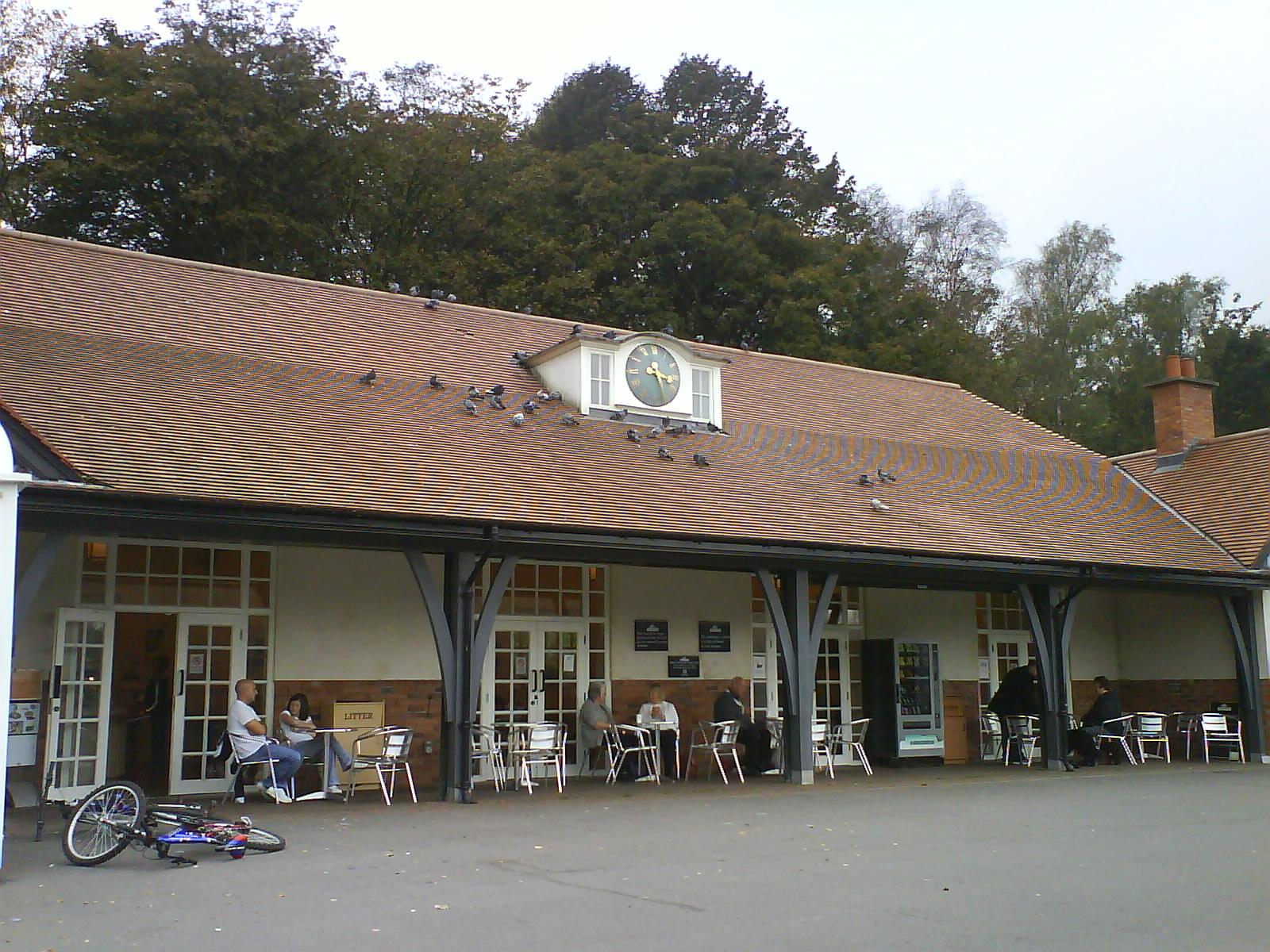
Lakeside Cafe

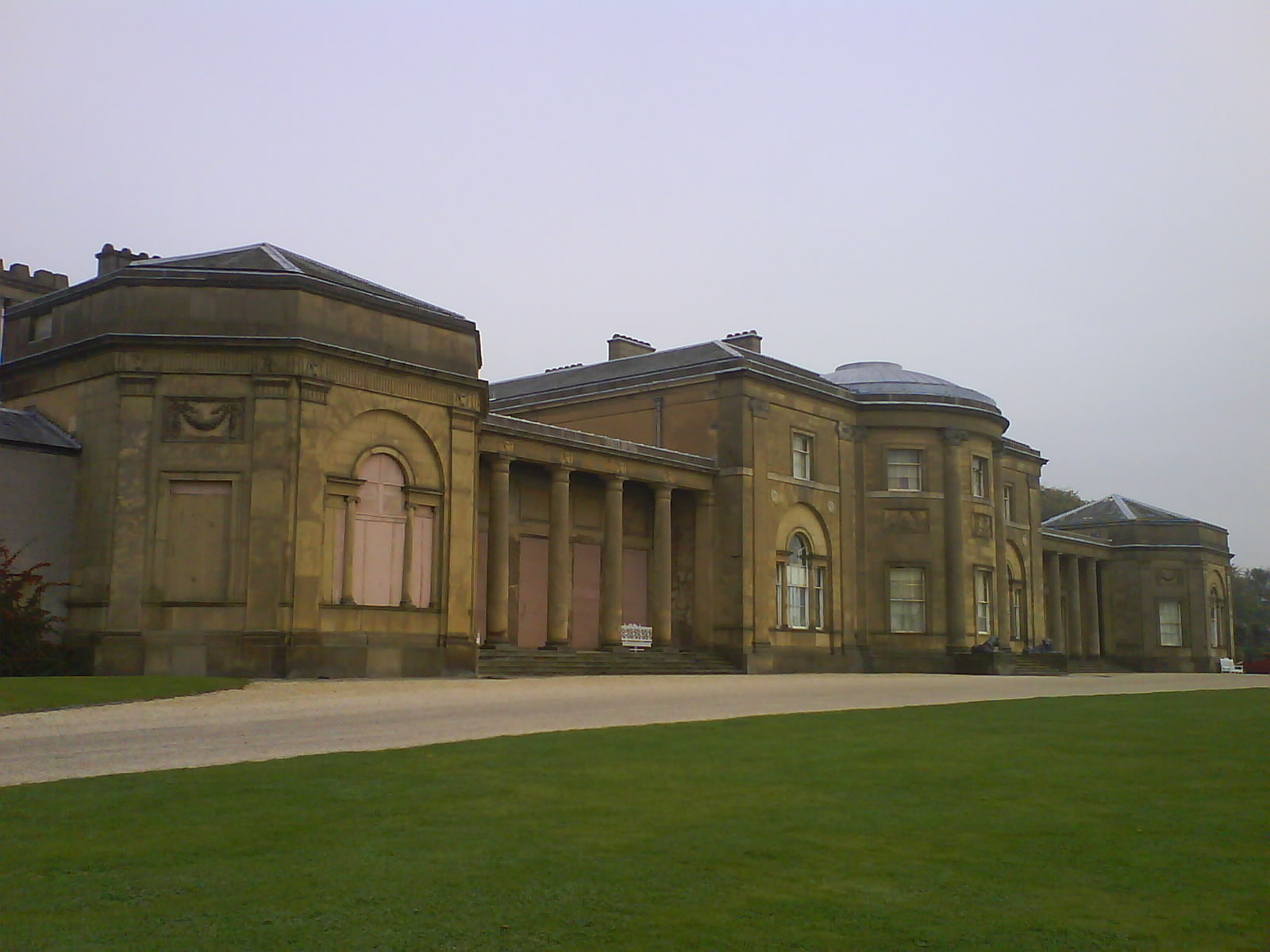
Heaton Hall

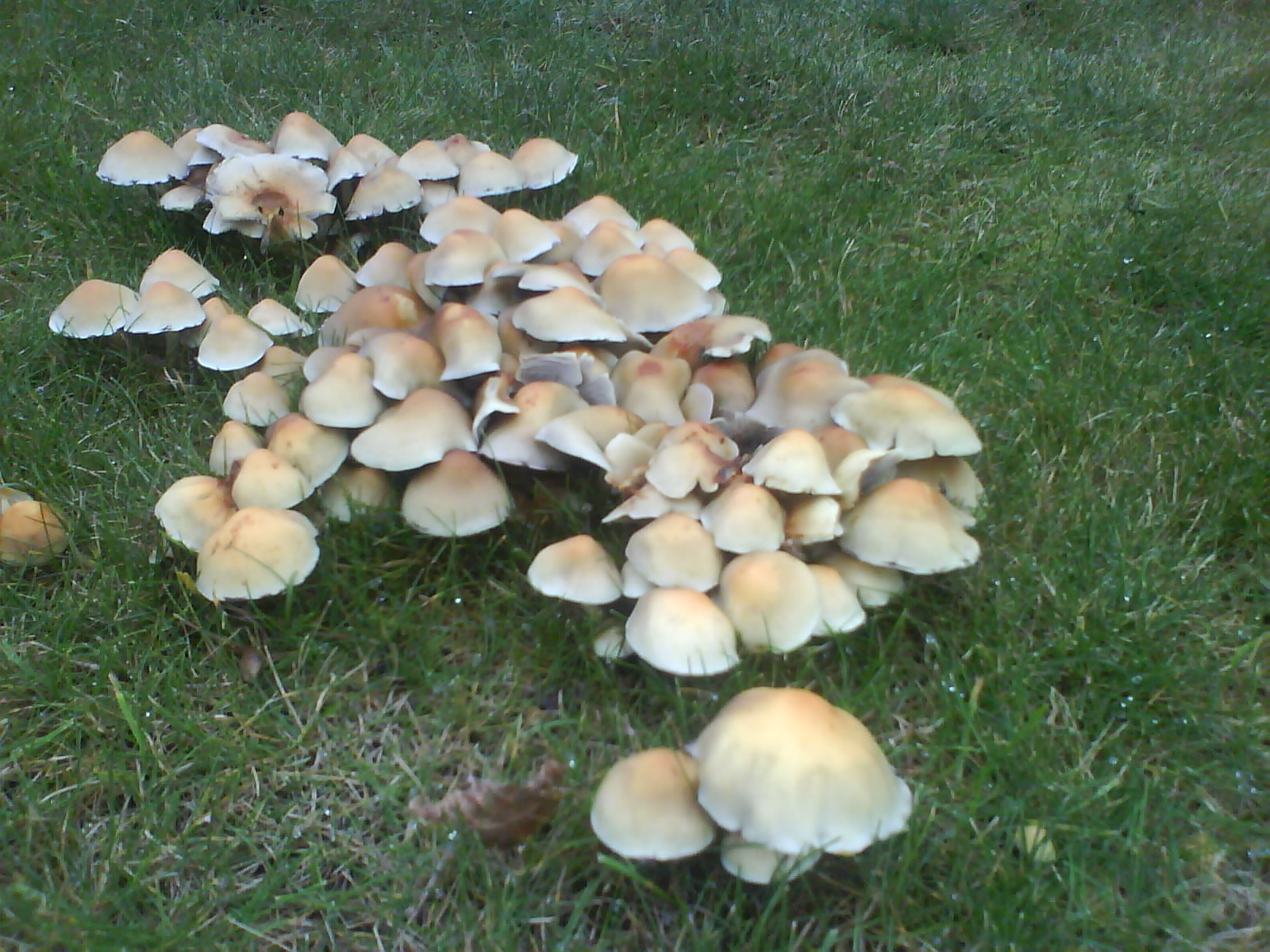
Fungi in the park

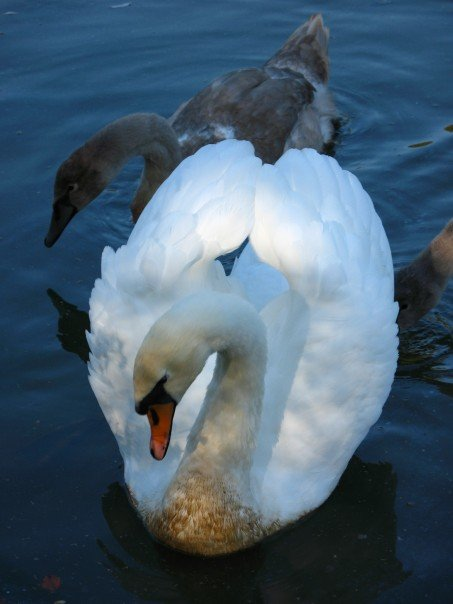
Swan and cygnet

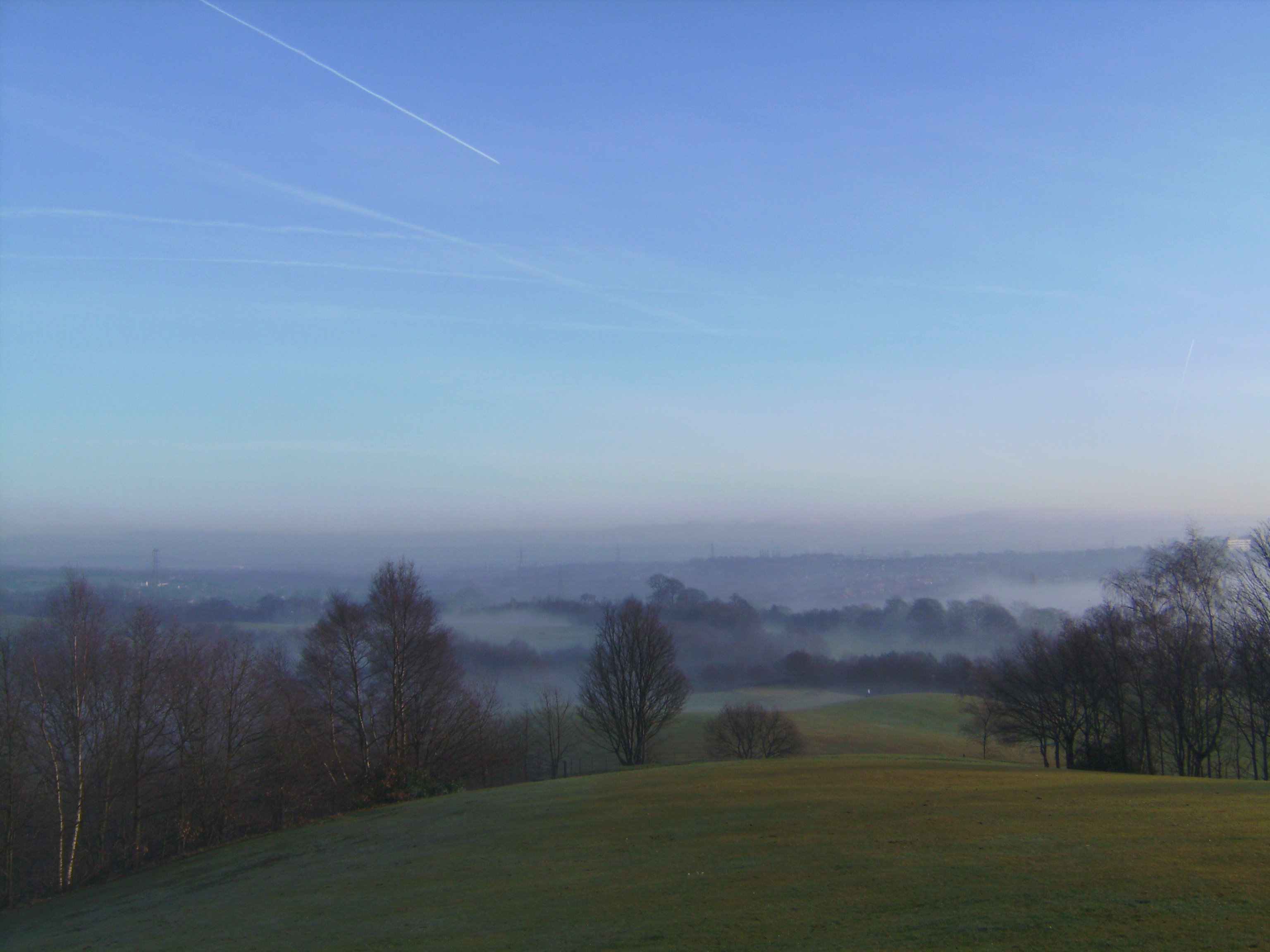
Morning mist from the temple

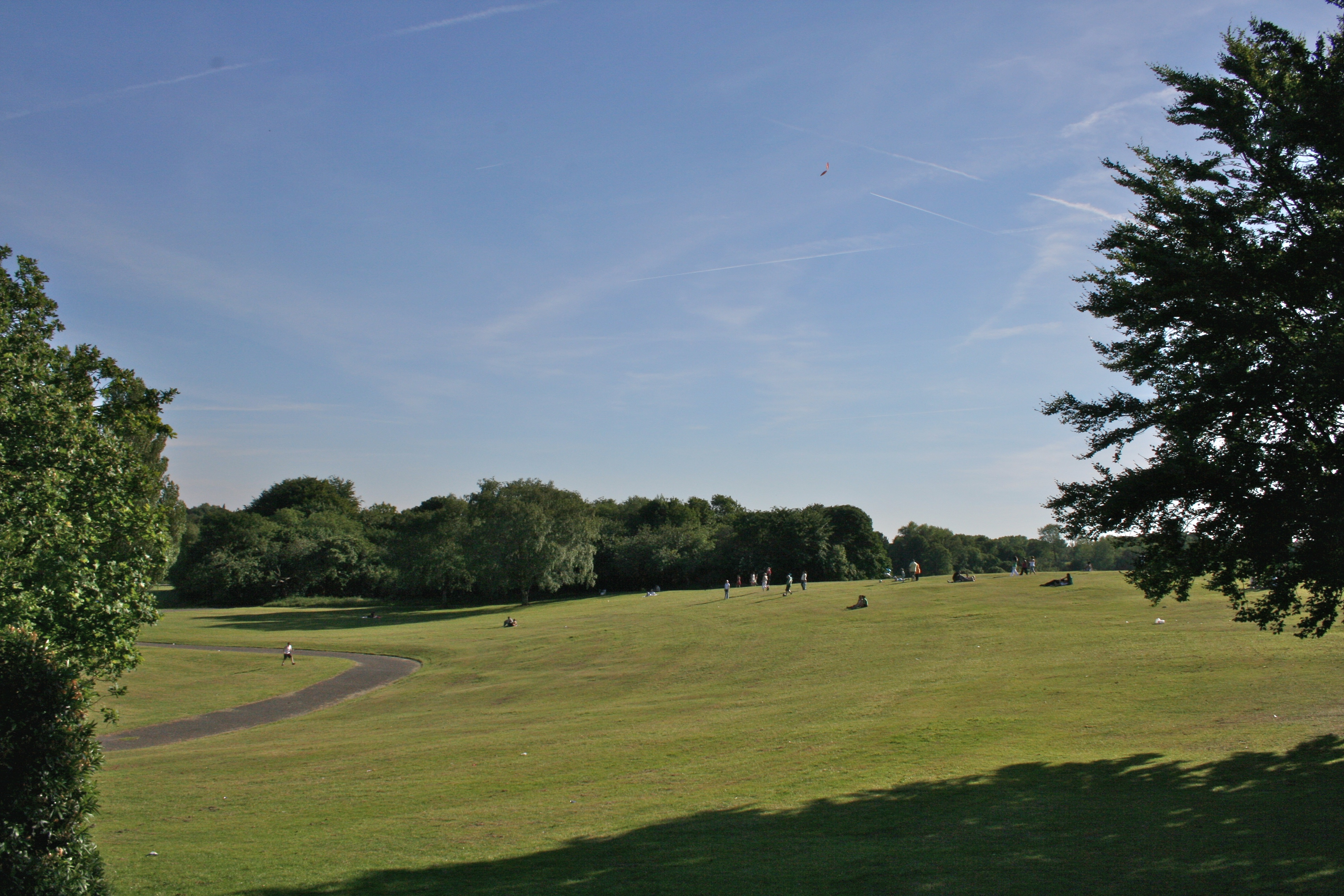
Open space in Heaton Park

Parkrun participants gather at the cafe
