= Listed buildings in Manchester-M16 =

Manchester is a city in Northwest England. The M16 postcode area is to the south of the city centre, and contains the area of Whalley Range. The postcode area contains 13 listed buildings that are recorded in the National Heritage List for England. Of these, one is listed at Grade II*, the middle grade of the three grades, and the others are at Grade II, the lowest grade.

The area, which is mainly residential, was developed in the middle of the 19th century, and at this time a number of educational buildings were also established. The listed buildings consist of houses, churches, a bowling club pavilion, colleges and schools, some of which have changed their purposes since they were first established.

== Key ==
Grade	Criteria
II*	Particularly important buildings of more than special interest
II	Buildings of national importance and special interest

== Buildings ==
Name and location	Photograph	Date	Notes	Grade
GMB National College; 53.44910°N 2.26441°W		1840–1843	Originally a Nonconformist seminary, and later used for other educational purposes, it was reordered in 1876–80 by Alfred Waterhouse. The building is in sandstone at the front, brick at the rear, and has slate roofs. It has an E-shaped plan, and is in Gothic style. The front range has two storeys and a full basement storey, and a symmetrical front of 23 bays with a central tower. At the base of the tower is a Tudor arched doorway, above which is a full-height oriel window incorporating a clock face, and with a pierced parapet and crocketed corner pinnacles. Over this is a two-stage octagonal lantern with gargoyles and pinnacles. Flanking the tower, along the basement storeys are Tudor arched arcades. The windows are mullioned or mullioned and transomed. (Note: As of 2017 the building is the British Muslim Heritage Centre.)	II*
Entrance gateway and gates, GMB National College; 53.44982°N 2.26439°W	—	c. 1840	The gateway is flanked by octagonal sandstone piers with pinnacles, and outside these are gabled archways. The gates are in cast iron and are elaborately decorated.	II
St Margaret's Church, Whalley Range; 53.45538°N 2.26029°W		1848–49	The church, designed by James Harrison in Decorated style, is in sandstone and has a red tiled roof with a cockscomb ridge. It consists of a nave with a clerestory, north and south aisles, a north porch, a chancel with a north vestry and a south chapel, and a west steeple. The steeple has a three-stage tower with angle buttresses, a west doorway, a two-light west window, and a broach spire that has large lucarnes at the base with crockete gablets, smaller lucarnes above, and a weathervane.	II
4 and 6 Withington Road; 53.45768°N 2.25873°W	—	Mid-19th century	A pair of stuccoed brick houses on a plinth, with quoins, a sill band, a frieze with raised panels, eaves with paired brackets, and a slate roof. They are in Italianate style, with two storeys, cellars and attics, a double-depth plan, a symmetrical front of five bays, and rear extensions. The middle bay projects forward and is gabled. The round-headed doorways have fluted Corinthian pilasters, semicircular fanlights, and bracketed cornices. In the outer bays are canted bay windows, and the other windows are sashes.	II
8 and 10 Withington Road; 53.45744°N 2.25882°W	—	Mid-19th century	A pair of stuccoed brick houses with a slate roof. They have two storeys, cellars and attics, a double-depth plan, a symmetrical front with each house having three bays, and rear extensions. The outer bays project forward and are gabled. In the middle bay of each house is a doorway with a Tudor arched head, a double-chamfered surround and a hood mould. In the outer bays are canted bay windows, and in the inner bays are small rectangular bay windows. Most of the windows have hood moulds, those in No. 10 are sashes, with an arched window in the attic with Y-tracery. The windows in No. 8 have altered glazing.	II
12 and 14 Withington Road; 53.45719°N 2.25885°W	—	Mid-19th century	A pair of stuccoed brick houses on a plinth, with quoins, a sill band, a frieze with raised panels, eaves with paired brackets, and a slate roof. They are in Italianate style, with two storeys, cellars and attics, a double-depth plan, a symmetrical front of five bays, and rear extensions. The middle bay projects forward and is gabled. The round-headed doorways have fluted Corinthian pilasters, semicircular fanlights, and bracketed cornices. In the outer bays are canted bay windows, and the other windows are sashes.	II
Old Trafford Bowling Club pavilion 53.46037°N 2.28094°W	—	1877	The pavilion is in orange brick on a plinth, with sandstone dressings, sill bands, applied timber framing to the upper storey, and a slate roof with canted coping, and is in Tudor Revival style. There are two storeys and three bays, the middle bay wider and gabled with elaborate bargeboards. The upper floor is recessed, forming a balcony over a ground floor verandah.	II
St Bede's College; 53.45157°N 2.25260°W		1877–1880	A Roman Catholic independent school, built around the original Manchester Aquarium building by Dunn and Hansom. It is in Italian Renaissance style, and built in red brick with red terracotta dressings, a frieze with scrolls, a modillioned cornice, and a pierced parapet with piers. The building has an L-shaped plan, the main range with four storeys and an attic, a front of 11 bays, the left two bays projecting forward, and a single-storey three-bay porch at the right end. The windows have decorative architraves, those on the ground floor with pediments containing busts with different heads. In the centre of the porch is a round-headed doorway with twisted blue columns, a segmental pediment, and a lettered frieze, and at the top is a balustraded parapet with statues.	II
Hartley Hall, railings and gates 53.44520°N 2.25221°W	—	1878–79	Originally a Methodist college, it was altered in 1896–98, and again in 1904–06, and has been used for different purposes, most recently as a grammar school. The building is in brick with dressings in stone and red terracotta, and it has a slate roof. There is an irregular plan with the main range parallel to the street and rear wings, in two storeys with attics and basements. There is an octagonal clock tower with a cupola, and a Perpendicular-style chapel. At the front are wrought iron railings with gates, lamp brackets, and a scrolled overthrow with an escutcheon.	II
St Edmund's Church, Whalley Range; 53.45305°N 2.25288°W		1881–82	The church, now redundant, is in Geometrical style. It is in sandstone with a slate roof, and consists of a nave with a clerestory, north and south aisles, and a polygonal apse. At the northwest is an unfinished tower, with two stages and buttresses.	II
William Hulme Grammar School; 53.44587°N 2.24866°W		1886	The school was extended to the south in 1910 with a linked block. The building is in red brick with yellow brick bands, terracotta dressings, and green slate roofs. The north, original, block has two storeys, a basement, and a full attic storey. There are nine bays, the centre projecting forward with a gable and containing a porch with a round-headed doorway and a parapet, and on the roof is a flèche. A single-storey three-bay link joins this to the south block, which has a hall over a basement, and six bays, two of which contain five-sided oriel windows. On the roof is a lead-clad cupola.	II
Railings, gates and gate piers, William Hulme Grammar School; 53.44575°N 2.24890°W	—	1886 (probable)	There are two pairs of square brick banded gate piers with shaped pyramidal caps. Between them are low brick walls with stone coping. The cast iron gates and railings have fleur-de-lys standards and panels containing tracery.	II
English Martyrs Church, Whalley Range; 53.44691°N 2.25145°W		1895–96	A Roman Catholic church in sandstone with a slate roof, in Early English style. It consists of a nave with a clerestory, north and south aisles, a north confessional, a south porch, a chancel with transeptal chapels, and a northwest steeple. The steeple has a tower with clasping pilasters, a corbel-table with gargoyles, corner pinnacles, and a broach spire containing an arcaded stage with colonnettes, trefoil arches, and crocketed gablets. At the west end is an arched doorway with a gable, above which is a niche with a statue.	II

== Notes and references ==
=== Sources ===
- British Muslim Heritage Centre, History
- Historic England, "GMB National College, Manchester (1197762)", National Heritage List for England
- Historic England, "Entrance gateway and gates to GMB National College, Manchester (1283094)", National Heritage List for England
- Historic England, "Church of St Margaret, Manchester (1254863)", National Heritage List for England
- Historic England, "Nos. 4 and 6 Withington Road, Manchester (1255032)", National Heritage List for England
- Historic England, "Nos. 8 and 10 Withington Road, Manchester (1270483)", National Heritage List for England
- Historic England, "Nos. 12 and 14 Withington Road, Manchester (1255033)", National Heritage List for England
- Historic England, "Old Trafford Bowling Club Pavilion, Manchester (1482187)", National Heritage List for England
- Historic England, "St Bede's College, Manchester (1207517)", National Heritage List for England
- Historic England, "Hartley Hall and attached railings and gates, Manchester (1197825)", National Heritage List for England
- Historic England, "Church of St Edmund, Manchester (1197826)", National Heritage List for England
- Historic England, "William Hulme Grammar School, Manchester (1270699)", National Heritage List for England
- Historic England, "Railings, two pairs of gatepiers and gates to William Hulme Grammar School, Manchester (1254638)", National Heritage List for England
- Historic England, "Church of English Martyrs, Manchester (1207509)", National Heritage List for England
- Historic England, Listed Buildings
- Hartwell, Clare; Hyde, Matthew; Pevsner, Nikolaus (2004), Lancashire: Manchester and the South-East, The Buildings of England, New Haven and London: Yale University Press, ISBN 0-300-10583-5
