= Listed buildings in Manchester-M9 =

Manchester is a city in Northwest England. The M9 postcode area is to the north of the city centre and includes the districts of Blackley and Harpurhey. This postcode area contains 15 listed buildings that are recorded in the National Heritage List for England. Of these, one is listed at Grade II*, the middle of the three grades, and the others are at Grade II, the lowest grade. The area is residential, and the listed buildings include houses, churches, a pillar box, a statue, a former public baths and laundry, a war memorial, and a crematorium.

== Key ==
Grade	Criteria
II*	Particularly important buildings of more than special interest
II	Buildings of national importance and special interest

== Buildings ==
Name and location	Photograph	Date	Notes	Grade
113 Crab Lane; 53.53204°N 2.22961°W		Late 18th century (probable)	A red brick house with a stone-slate roof. It has two low storeys, a single-depth plan, and two bays. On the front is a 20th-century porch, and the windows are 20th-century top-hung casements.	II
Crofters House; 53.50775°N 2.20734°W		c. 1810	A roughcast house with a moulded gutter cornice and a slate roof. There are two storeys and a symmetrical front of three bays. In the centre is a doorway with a rusticated surround, flanked by semicircular bow windows with Tuscan pilasters, plain friezes, and cornices. On the upper floor are windows with lintels scored to resemble voussoirs. All the windows are sashes.	II
162–172 Crab Lane; 53.53250°N 2.22913°W		c. 1820–1830	A row of six red brick cottages with a slate roof. They have two storeys, a double-depth plan, and one bay each. Most of the windows are casements, No. 168 has a two-storey bay window, four of the doorways are round-headed, and the other have square heads.	II
136–142 Crab Lane; 53.53184°N 2.22915°W		Early 19th century	A row of four cottages in pink and brown brick with a stone-slate roof. They have two storeys and one bay each. No. 142 has a square-headed doorway, and the other doorways are round-headed. The windows in Nos 138 and 140 are horizontally-sliding sashes, and in the other houses they are casements.	II
691–695 Rochdale Road; 53.50575°N 2.21820°W		Early 19th century	A row of three brick houses, partly roughcast, with slate roofs. The central house has a plinth, a sill band, a moulded eaves cornice and an open pedimented gable. The left house has a recessed porch with set-in columns, a semicircular bay window with pilasters and an entablature and a hipped roof. The right house has an elliptical-arched doorway with a fanlight, a semicircular bay window with pilasters and an elaborate entablature, and a hipped roof. Some windows in the houses are sashes, and others have been altered.	II
Pleasant View; 53.53180°N 2.22893°W		Early 19th century	A row of four brick houses, two roughcast, with a slate roof. They have two storeys, a double-depth plan, and a front of five bays. Two of the doorways have round heads, and the windows are altered casements.	II
Christ Church, Harpurhey; 53.51155°N 2.21367°W		1837–38	The church was designed by Edward Welch in Early English style, and the clock was added in 1851. The church is in sandstone with a slate roof, and consists of a nave embracing a west steeple, north and south porches, and a chancel with a polygonal apse. The steeple has a two-stage tower with pilaster buttresses, a west doorway, and a spire incorporating a belfry stage, with buttresses rising to pinnacles, and containing triple lancet windows with clock faces above. The windows along the sides of the church are stepped triple lancets, and all the windows have hood moulds.	II
St Peter's Church, Blackley; 53.52346°N 2.21803°W		1844	A Commissioners' church, it was designed by E. H. Shellard in Early English style. The church is in sandstone with a slate roof, and consists of a nave, north and south aisles, a chancel with a north vestry and a south chapel, and a west tower embraced by the nave. The tower has four stages, buttresses in the lower two stages, and pilasters above, becoming octagonal in the top stage, a west doorway, a three-light west window, an oculus in a crocketed diamond surround, clock faces, and a plain parapet. There are pinnacles on the corners of the body of the church, and the east window has five lights.	II*
GPO pillar box 53.51696°N 2.21332°W		1859–1879	The pillar box is of the Hexagonal Penfold type designed by John Penfold. It is in cast iron with a hexagonal section, and is about 2 metres (6 ft 7 in) tall. The pillar box has a moulded lettered base, a semi-hexagonal door with a monogram, a posting slot, a frieze containing the Royal Arms, a moulded cornice, and a shallow ogee cap with acanthus leaves and a ball flower finial.	II
Brierley statue in Queen's Park to west of park entrance 53.50460°N 2.21943°W		1898	The statue commemorates the writer and dialect poet Benjamin Brierley. It is in stone, the sculptor was John Cassidy, and it stands on a plinth.	II
Church of Our Lady of Mount Carmel and walls 53.51924°N 2.21406°W		1906–1908	A Roman Catholic church in Perpendicular style, it was remodelled in 1965. The church is built in red brick with stone dressings and slate roofs. It consists of a nave with a clerestory and a narthex, a west porch and former baptistry, a narrow south aisle, a wider north aisle, a Lady Chapel, a sanctuary, a sacristy, and a southwest corner tower. In the west gable is a niche containing a statue. The tower is square with an octagonal turret with an embattled parapet. At the north end is a garden enclosed by red brick walls with stone coping and containing brick piers with shaped stone caps.	II
Holy Trinity Church, Harpurhey; 53.51398°N 2.20744°W		1908	The church, designed by Basil Champneys in Arts and Crafts style, is in bright red brick with some sandstone dressings and a pantile roof. It consists of a nave with a clerestory, a narthex, north and south aisles, and a low chancel. On the east gable of the nave is a bellcote. The buttresses are broad, and rise above the eaves with tiled gables. The west window has a pointed arch and five lights, and is flanked by niches with statues. In the clerestory, the windows are broad with pointed heads and five lights, and in the aisles they are square-headed with single lights.	II
Harpurhey Baths and laundry 53.51483°N 2.21245°W		1909	This consists of an entrance block, swimming pools at the rear, and the former laundry area to the south, with a chimney. The entrance block is in red brick and buff terracotta with slate roofs. It is in Baroque style, and has two storeys with attics, and five bays, on an orange terracotta plinth, with pilasters, and a cornice at the top. In the second and fourth bays are round-headed doorways with keystones and cornices, and at the top are open segmental pediments. The ground floor contains round-headed windows with altered glazing, and above are sash windows with flat heads on the top floor and with segmental heads in the attics. All the windows have terracotta surrounds and keystones.	II
Blackley War Memorial; 53.52090°N 2.21047°W		1921	The war memorial consists of a bronze statue of a Winged Victory standing on a globe and holding a wreath in an outstretched hand. The statue is on a tapered square stone pedestal on a square base with three steps on the south side. On the pedestal are panels containing the names of those lost.	II
Blackley Crematorium; 53.52933°N 2.23715°W		1959	The crematorium in Blackley Cemetery is built in brown brick and concrete, and has aluminium window frames. It is symmetrical with a single storey and consists of a large central chapel flanked by two smaller ranges. Across the front of the main chapel is a giant bow window with mullions in Portland stone 22 feet 6 inches (6.86 m) tall, and two transoms, on a plinth of black granite. On the front is a cross in concrete with terrazzo cladding 17 feet (5.2 m) tall and 6 feet (1.8 m) wide. Flanking the central chapel are two-tiered flat-roofed ranges containing entrance halls and side chapels.	II
