= Listed buildings in Manchester-M25 (Manchester district) =

Manchester is a city in Northwest England. Most of the M25 postcode area is in the Metropolitan Borough of Bury, but part of it is in the Manchester district of the city. This part of the postcode area contains eight listed buildings that are recorded in the National Heritage List for England. Of these, one is listed at Grade I, the highest of the three grades, three are at Grade II*, the middle grade, and the others are at Grade II, the lowest grade. All the buildings are in Heaton Park.

== Key ==
Grade	Criteria
I	Buildings of exceptional interest, sometimes considered to be internationally important
II*	Particularly important buildings of more than special interest
II	Buildings of national importance and special interest

== Buildings ==
Name and location	Photograph	Date	Notes	Grade
Dower House; 53.53882°N 2.25653°W		18th century	The building to the north of Heaton Hall is in sandstone, partly stuccoed, and has a 20th-century pantile roof. It is in Classical style with a rectangular plan. At the front are Tuscan columns distyle in antis, a plain entablature, and a moulded pediment. There is a central doorway, and the side windows contain sash windows.	II
Heaton Hall; 53.53622°N 2.25296°W		Mid-18th century	A country house that was remodelled between 1772 and 1789 by James Wyatt. Further additions were made in 1823 by Lewis Wyatt, and the building has since been used as a museum and art gallery. It is built in sandstone with dressings in Coade stone and hipped slate roofs, and is in Palladian style. The south front consists of a long symmetrical range and has a central block with two storeys and five bays, the central three bays forming a two-storey bow window. The central block is flanked by single-storey, seven-bay wings containing colonnades, linking with single-storey octagonal pavilions. Steps, flanked by statues of a lion and a lioness, lead up to the central bow window, which has giant Ionic columns and pilasters, a guilloché string course, a frieze, a blocking course, and a cornice; the windows are sashes. Each outer bay contains a blind Venetian window on the ground floor, and a sash window above. In the north front are seven bays, a central pediment, and a tetrastyle portico.	I
Sundial; 53.53639°N 2.25213°W		1765	The sundial in front of the orangery of Heaton Hall is in sandstone. It has a carved vase pedestal and a copper plate with an inscription and date. The gnomon is damaged.	II
Rose Cottage; 53.53482°N 2.26310°W		Late 18th century	Originally the head gardener's cottage, it is in red brick with a slate roof. There are two storeys, and the building is in two parts, with the dwelling to the west and a store to the east. The dwelling faces south and has three bays, a round-headed doorway with quarter columns and a fanlight, and sash windows with wedge lintels. The other part faces north and has an arched doorway and casement windows.	II
Temple; 53.53748°N 2.25054°W		Late 18th century (probable)	The structure to north-east of Heaton Hall is in sandstone, and consists of rotunda with a Doric colonnade, a dentilled cornice, and a ribbed copper-clad dome. On the top is a miniature version of the whole structure.	II*
Former stables 53.53627°N 2.25533°W		1777	The stable block to the north-west of Heaton Hall was designed by Samuel Wyatt. It is in red brick with sandstone dressings and hipped slate roofs, and has a U-shaped plan with a main range and receding wings. The main range is symmetrical and has a two-storey three-bay central entrance block with an archway over which is a Diocletian window. The flanking bays are pedimented, and on the roof is an octagonal clock turret. From the central block are single-storey wings leading to two-storey coach houses with doors and Diocletian windows above. Most of the windows are tilting casements.	II
Grand Lodge and walls 53.52529°N 2.26272°W		1807	A gateway at the southwest entrance to Heaton Park, it is in sandstone, and was designed by Lewis Wyatt. The structure consists of a round-headed archway flanked by paired Doric three-quarter columns, with impost bands, and a scrolled keystone. The entablature includes a moulded cornice, and a parapet with a panelled upstand. At the sides are single-storey flat-roofed lodges with lunettes in the returns, and the gateway is flanked on both sides by curved walls.	II*
Colonnade; 53.52885°N 2.25752°W		c. 1822–1824	The colonnade was designed by Francis Goodwin. It was originally the portico at the front of the previous Manchester Town Hall, and was moved to its present site by the lake to the south of Heaton Hall in 1912. It is in sandstone, and consists of four giant fluted Ionic columns with an entablature containing an egg-and-dart string course, a cornice, and a parapet. The columns are flanked by single-bay screen walls that have pilasters and a frieze with palmette decoration, a doorway, and a coved niche with a statue.	II*
