= George Augustus Lee =

British industrialist (1761–1826)

George Augustus Lee (1761 – 5 August 1826) was a British industrialist. His cotton mill in Salford was an early iron-framed building, and he pioneered the use of steam power and gas lighting in industry.

== Early life ==
He was the only son of the actor-manager John Lee. The authors Sophia Lee and Harriet Lee were his sisters.

In the 1780s he was a clerk at Peter Drinkwater's cotton mill in Northwich in Cheshire. In 1791 Drinkwater appointed him as manager of Piccadilly Mill, a new cotton mill in Manchester. He left the following year, to be managing partner in the mill in Salford owned by George and John Philips, Peter Atherton and Charles Wood. The company was later known as Philips and Lee.

== The Salford mill ==
Lee's character was described in an obituary: "Mr. Lee became early imbued with a love of the sciences, and was afterwards remarkable for the extent and precision of his acquirements in them. He had a quick and almost intuitive perception of the advantages to be derived from applying to useful purposes the great inventions that distinguished the era in which he lived, and the rare faculty of directing them, with energy and perseverance, to the fulfilment of extensive and important designs."

His friends included William Strutt and William Murdoch, and recent advances in technology were utilized. Aware of the advantages of the steam-engine soon after the improvements of James Watt, Lee installed steam power for the cotton-spinning machinery. A new mill, based on designs by Charles Bage and William Strutt, was erected from 1799 to 1801: it was an iron-framed building, the second such building in Britain after Ditherington Flax Mill. He knew of the experiments in gas lighting by William Murdoch, and in 1805 gas lighting was introduced, the first for a cotton mill. There was steady improvement of the machinery. Steam was used for heating the building, and a sick scheme was organized for the workforce.

The obituary describes his business abilities: "In his mercantile dealings, he was influenced by coolness and solidity of judgment, by a high sense of honour and probity, and by enlarged and comprehensive views of the general principles of commercial policy."

The company survived well the period of the Napoleonic Wars. The mill was regarded as a model enterprise; it was one of Manchester's sights, and industrialists and scientists visited it.

== Family ==
In 1803 Lee married Mary, daughter of the Revd John Ewart of Troqueer; they had five children. She died in 1811.

He continued to run the business until his retirement. He died, not long after retirement, at his home in Cheetham Hill on 5 August 1826. His eldest surviving daughter, Mary Ann, married in 1829 the politician William Ewart, a cousin.
