= Greater Manchester bus route 135 =

Bus route in Manchester, England

135
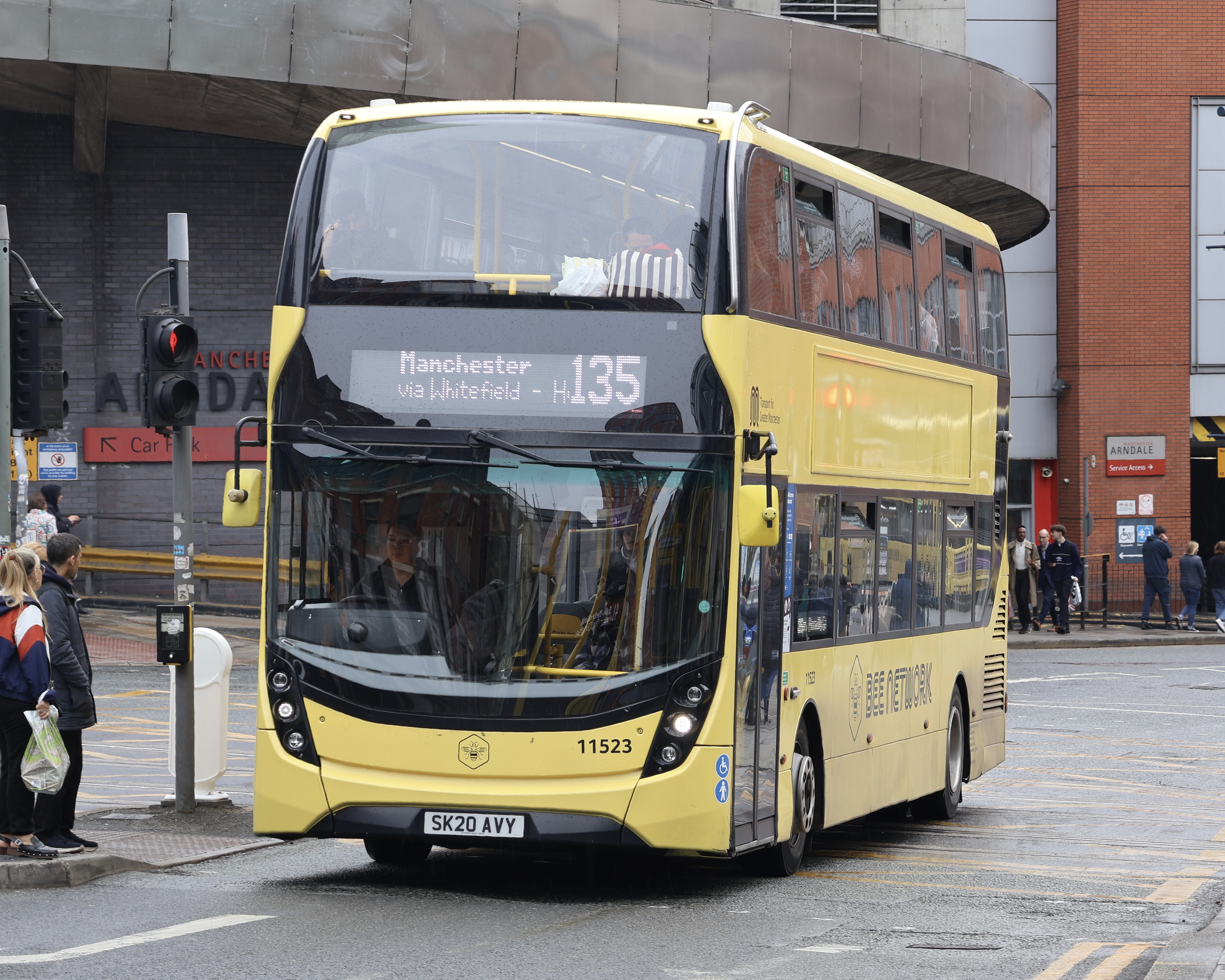
- Bee Network branded Stagecoach Manchester Alexander Dennis Enviro400 MMC on Shudehill in June 2025

Overview
- Operator: Stagecoach Manchester
- Garage: Queens Road
- Vehicle: Alexander Dennis Enviro400 MMC
- Predecessors: First Manchester; Go North West

Route
- Start: Piccadilly Gardens
- Via: Victoria; Cheetham Hill; Broughton Park; Heaton Park; Besses o' th' Barn
- End: Bury Interchange

Service
- Level: Daily, with overnight operation on Thursday to Saturday nights
- Frequency: 10-30 mins (daytime); 60 mins (Midnight operation, Thursdays to Saturdays only)

Greater Manchester bus route 135 is a Bee Network contracted bus route in Greater Manchester, England. Running between Piccadilly Gardens in Manchester city centre and Bury Interchange, it is operated by Stagecoach Manchester.

== History ==
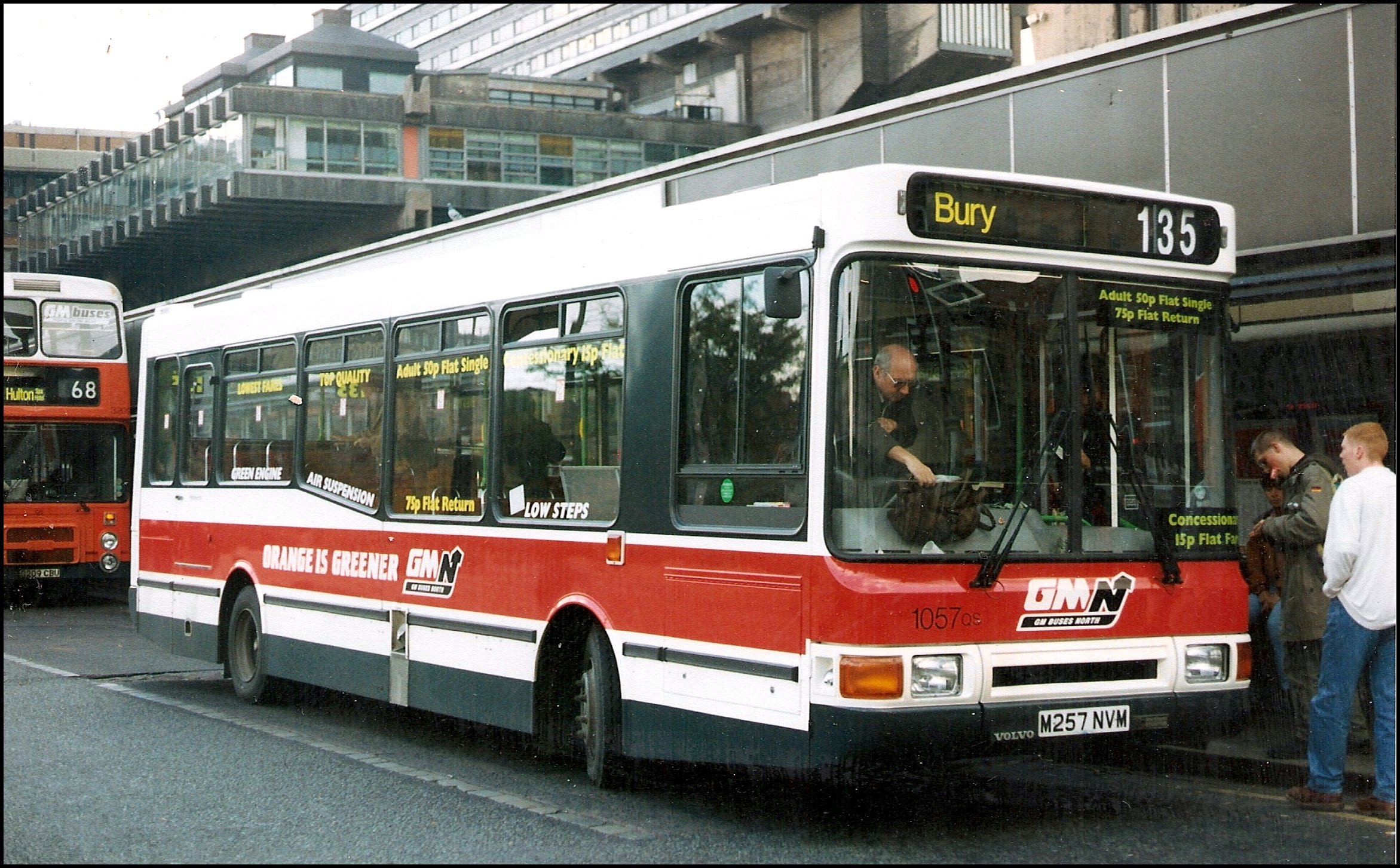
GM Buses North Northern Counties Paladin bodied Volvo B6LE at Piccadilly Gardens bus station in 1996

Route 135 can trace its origins back to route 35, which was operated jointly by the Manchester Corporation, the Bury Corporations, and Salford City Transport. The route gained its current numbering when ran by Greater Manchester Transport, and the original 35 number was later inherited by a new route operating between Piccadilly Gardens and Bryn Station.

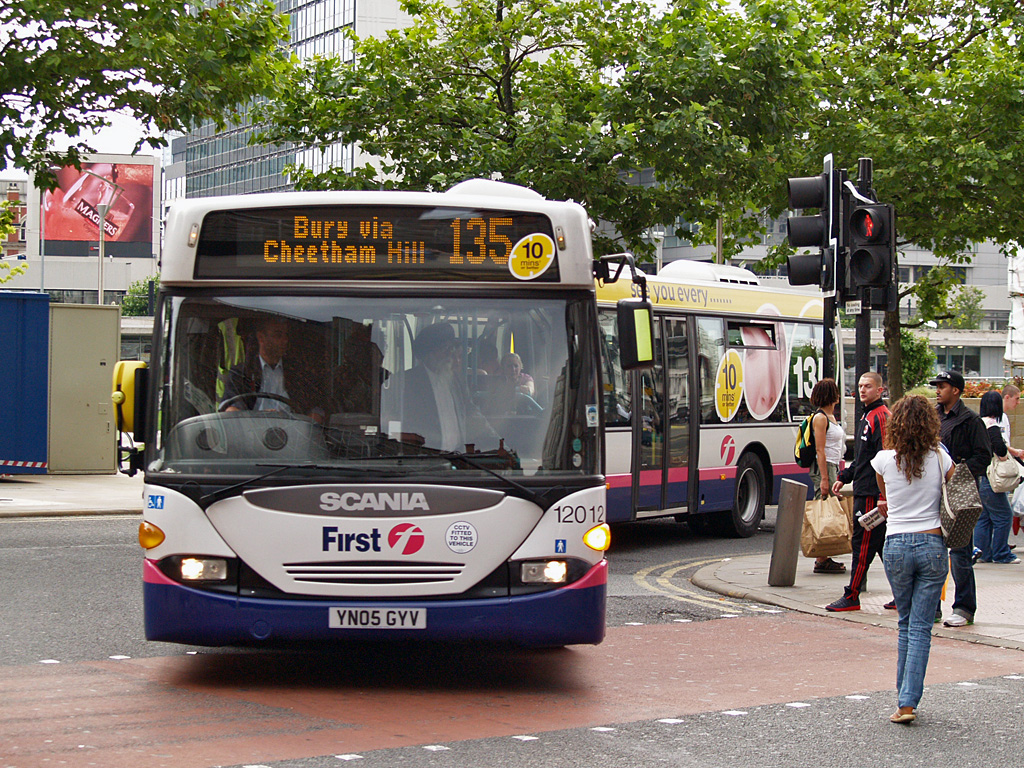
First Greater Manchester Scania OmniCity articulated bus at Piccadilly Gardens in July 2008

After the route had passed from GM Buses to GM Buses North upon the splitting of the former, when operated by First Manchester, the 135 was notable for being the only bus route in Greater Manchester to be operated using articulated buses. In April 1999, a fleet of 15 low-floor Wright Fusion bodied Volvo B10LAs replaced conventional double decker buses on the route, being trialled by the FirstGroup as a 'testbed' for future deliveries across its fleets. These were replaced in 2005 with a fleet of eighteen Scania OmniCity integrally-constructed buses, however in August 2017, these were withdrawn due to maintenance costs and space issues at Queens Road garage, being replaced by conventional buses.

As a result of £7.1 million of cuts to Transport for Greater Manchester's bus subsidies, the 135's weekend night bus service, running until 3:30 a.m. on Friday and Saturday nights, were withdrawn by First on 25 January 2015.

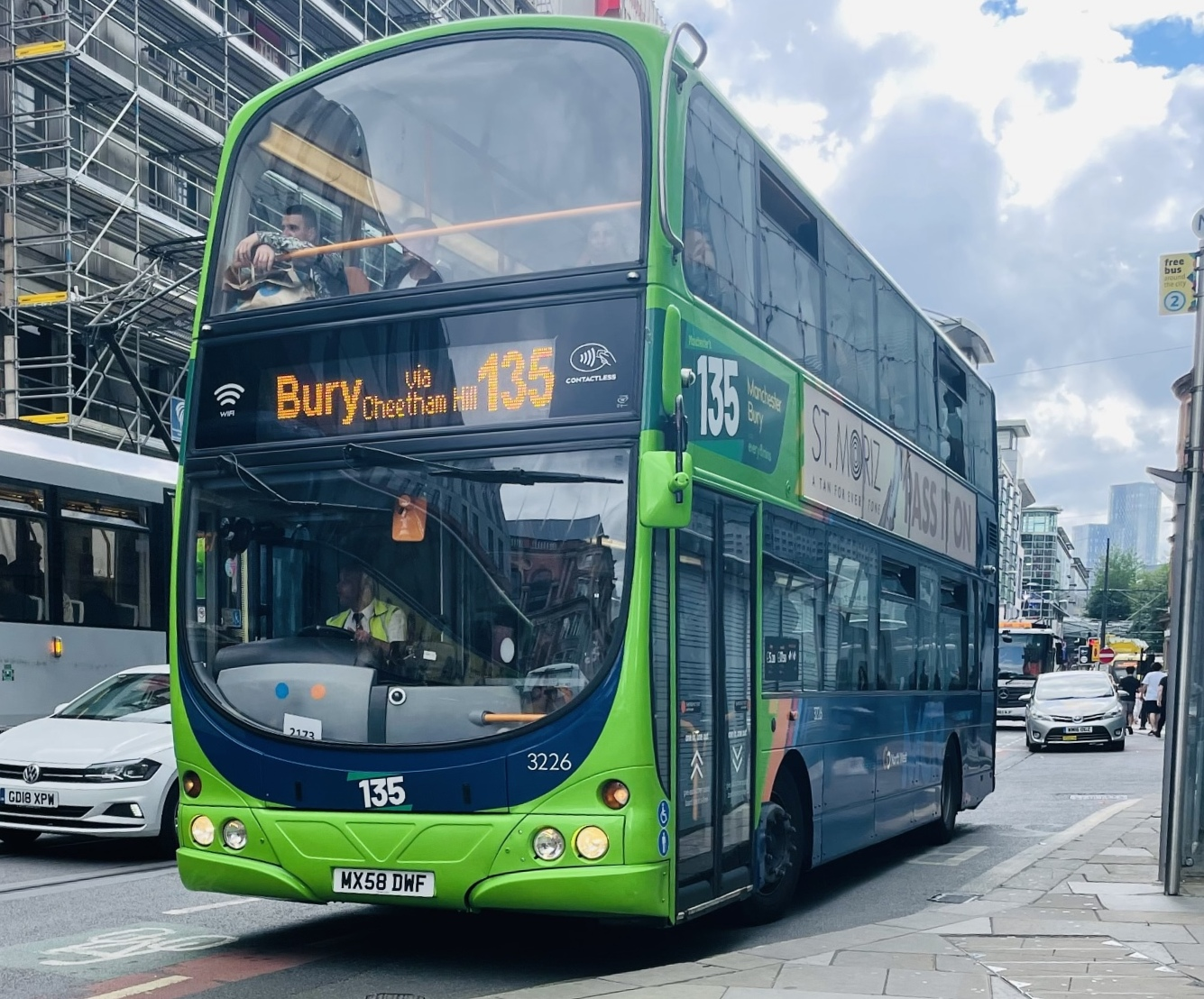
Go North West route-branded Wright Eclipse Gemini bodied Volvo B9TL in June 2022

The 135 passed to Go North West in June 2019 following the sale of First's Queens Road garage to the Go-Ahead Group. Under Go North West, route 135 received a fleet of refurbished ex-First Wright Eclipse Gemini bodied Volvo B9TLs painted in a green variant of standard Go North West fleet livery, featuring branding for the 135. These buses, along with the operations of the 135, passed to Stagecoach Manchester upon commencement of Tranche 2 of Bee Network bus franchising, which saw Queens Road garage transfer from Go North West to Stagecoach.

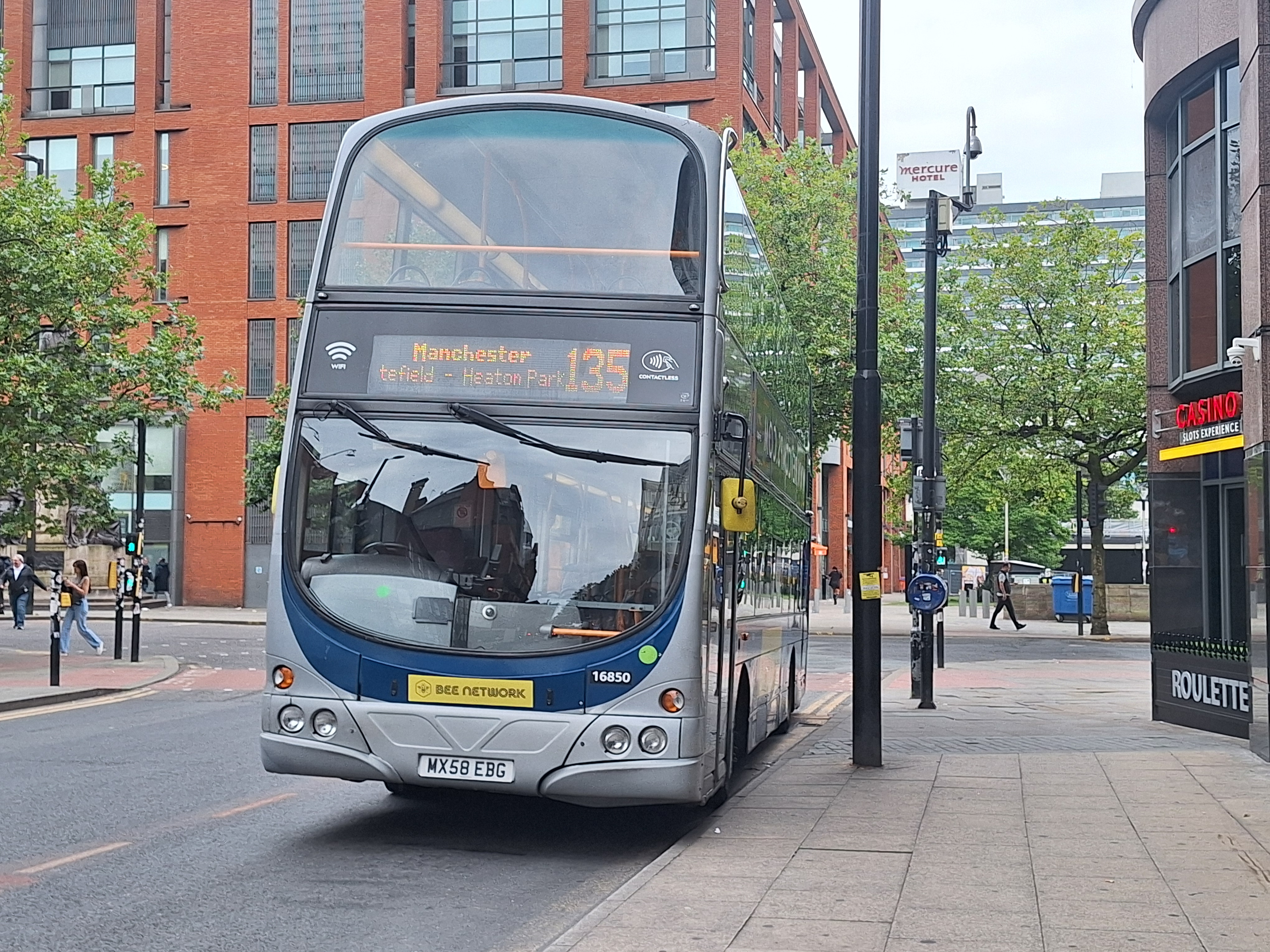
Stagecoach Manchester Wright Eclipse Gemini bodied Volvo B9TL at Piccadilly Gardens in August 2024

A fleet of new Alexander Dennis Enviro400 MMCs, painted in Bee Network yellow, were later allocated by Stagecoach Manchester to this route and operate together alongside the fleet of Wright Eclipse Geminis. Another batch of the Alexander Dennis Enviro400 MMCs were allocated to the route upon commencement of Tranche 3 of Bee Network in January 2025, to allow the Wright Eclipse Geminis getting acquired by Metroline Manchester. As part of the Greater Manchester Clean Air Plan created by the Greater Manchester Combined Authority, a fleet of battery electric buses are planned to replace these buses on the 135 upon the completion of electrification works at Queens Road garage, with the segment of the route on Lever Street near Stevenson Square identified as a site of risk for high concentrations of nitrogen dioxide air pollution.

== Current route ==
The 135 serves the following locations:

- Manchester Piccadilly Gardens
- Victoria
- Cheetham
- Cheetham Hill
- Broughton Park
- Heaton Park
- Besses o' th' Barn
- Bury Interchange

Route 135 primarily runs via the Bury Old Road, making the route more straightforward in comparison to route 163, since it does not need to serve Middleton bus station and Heywood on the Rochdale Road, as well as The Rock shopping centre.
