= Derby Brewery Arms =

Listed pub in Manchester, England

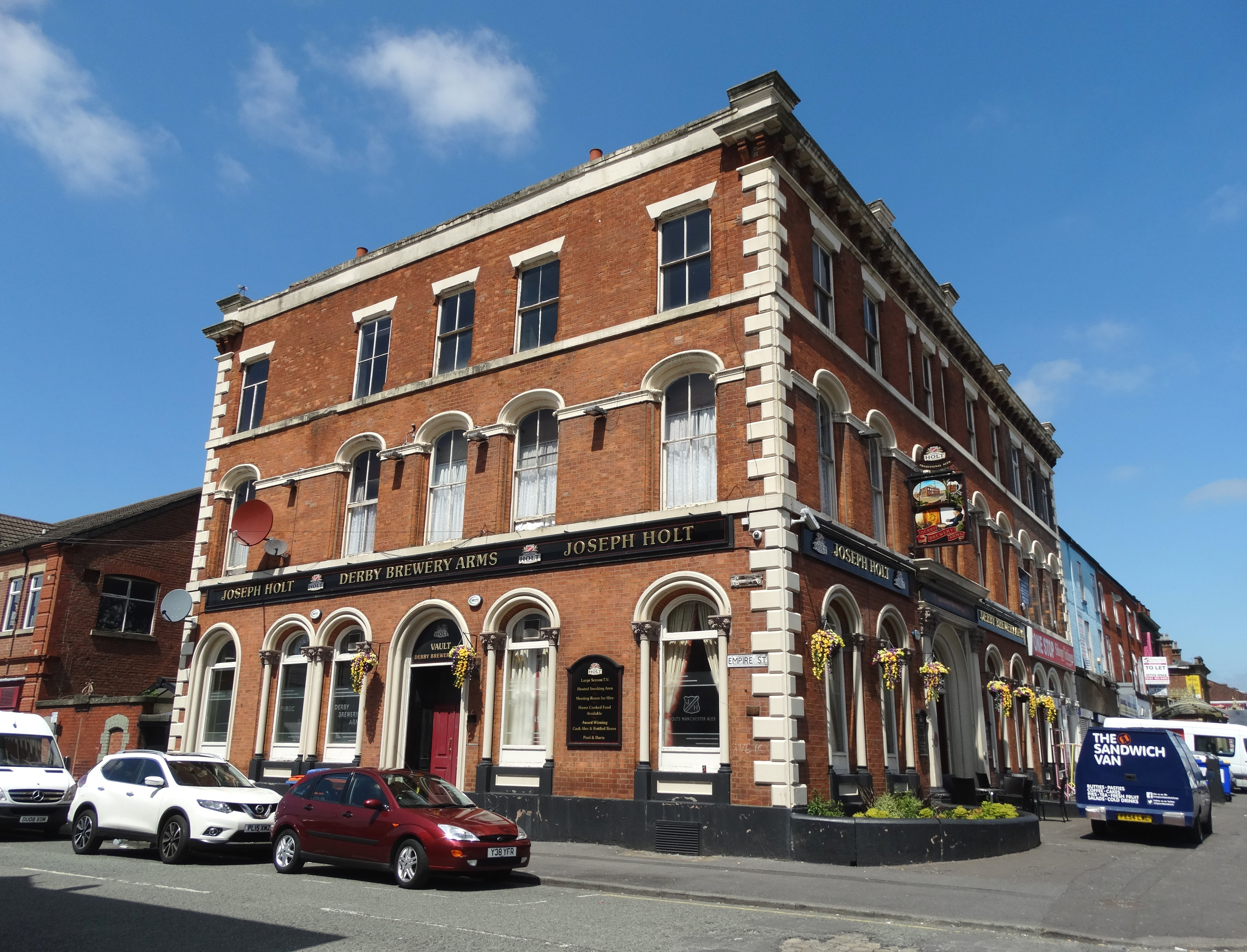
- The pub in 2016
- Former names: Knowsley Hotel
- Alternative names: The DBA

General information
- Type: Public house
- Location: 95 Cheetham Hill Road, Cheetham, Manchester, England
- Coordinates: 53.4931°N 2.2402°W
- Year built: Mid to late 19th century
- Renovated: 2021 (refurbished)

Design and construction
- Designations

Listed Building – Grade II
- Official name: Knowsley Hotel
- Designated: 3 October 1974
- Reference no.: 1197784

Website
- Official website

The Derby Brewery Arms (officially listed as the Knowsley Hotel) is a Grade II listed public house on Cheetham Hill Road in Cheetham, Manchester, England. Built in the mid to late 19th century and originally operating as a hotel, it later became part of the Joseph Holt estate and stands close to the company's historic Derby Brewery on Empire Street.

== History ==
The building was constructed in the mid to late 19th century and originally operated as the Knowsley Hotel, appearing on contemporary maps from 1891 in close proximity to Joseph Holt's Derby Brewery, which had been in operation since 1860.

By 1950, the hotel had become a public house, as shown on contemporary maps, where it appears as 95 Cheetham Hill Road; the part now numbered 97 was a separate building of unknown use.

At some point after its conversion to a pub, it became part of the Joseph Holt estate. The name Derby Brewery Arms came into use at an unknown date, and the building continues to be officially recorded under its earlier name in the National Heritage List for England. It is the nearest Joseph Holt pub to the company's brewery.

On 3 October 1974, the buildings at Nos. 95 and 97 were designated a single Grade II listed structure.

Today the Derby Brewery Arms functions as a traditional pub that also serves as a venue for contemporary nightlife, hosting DJ events and electronic music nights in its bar and courtyard.

== Architecture ==
The building is constructed of red brick with sandstone detailing, and its roofline is concealed. It occupies a plot on the corner of Cheetham Hill Road and Empire Street and has a simple rectangular plan, rising three storeys above a cellar. The section numbered 95 has a symmetrical five‑bay frontage with a raised base, horizontal sill bands, a bracketed cornice, and a parapet.

At street level, the central entrance is framed by Ionic-style stonework, with later doors and a plain fanlight. The ground-floor windows sit beneath shallow arches and have decorative aprons, slender shafts, and moulded heads, although the glazing has been replaced.

The upper floors contain four-pane sash windows. On the first floor they are set in shallow arches and linked by a continuous band; on the second floor they are square-headed, with a three-part window in the central bay.

No. 97, attached to the right and used commercially, has a doorway at the far end and follows the same general pattern of openings, though all of its glazing has been altered. The side elevation of No. 95 repeats the main design and includes a centrally placed doorway.

== See also ==
- Listed buildings in Manchester-M8
- Listed pubs in Manchester
