= Listed buildings in Manchester-M8 =

Manchester is a city in Northwest England. The M8 postcode area is to the north of the city centre, and contains the districts of Cheetham Hill and Crumpsall. This postcode area contains 21 listed buildings that are recorded in the National Heritage List for England. Of these, two are listed at Grade II*, the middle of the three grades, and the others are at Grade II, the lowest grade. The area is residential, and the listed buildings include churches and associated structures, houses, former civic buildings, two museums, a bandstand, a park shelter, a former billiard hall, and two war memorials.

== Key ==
Grade	Criteria
II*	Particularly important buildings of more than special interest
II	Buildings of national importance and special interest

== Buildings ==
Name and location	Photograph	Date	Notes	Grade
Churchyard railings, St Luke's Church; 53.50421°N 2.23557°W		1836–1839	The railings enclose the west and north sides of the churchyard, and are in Gothic style. The railings are in cast iron, they stand on dwarf stone walls, and contain stone gate piers with cusped ogee-arched panels in the fronts.	II
Ruins of St Luke's Church; 53.50390°N 2.23476°W		1836–1839	Only the tower, the west end of the aisles, and a vestry remain, and they are in Perpendicular style. The tower has three stages, with clasping buttresses, a west door, a four-light west window, an aperture for a clock face, paired lancet bell openings, and a pierced parapet with crocketed pinnacles. The aisles have embattled parapets.	II
9 and 11 Smedley Lane; 53.50435°N 2.23403°W	—	c. 1840	A pair of red brick houses on a plinth, with sandstone dressings, a sill band, a modillioned eaves cornice, and a slate roof. They have a double-depth plan, two storeys with cellars, and five bays. Both houses have stone doorcases, No. 9 with a pediment, and both houses have canted bay windows. The other windows have flat-arched heads and contain sashes.	II
13 and 15 Smedley Lane; 53.50430°N 2.23376°W	—	c. 1840	A pair of red brick houses on a plinth, with sandstone dressings, a sill band, a modillioned eaves cornice, and a slate roof. They have a double-depth plan, two storeys with cellars, and five bays. Each house has a doorway with pilasters, a dentilled cornice, a pediment and a fanlight, and a canted bay window with pilasters, a dentilled cornice, and sash windows. The other windows have flat-arched heads and sashes.	II
Temple Bank; 53.50449°N 2.23471°W	—	c. 1840	A house later used for other purposes, it is in red brick on a plinth, with stone dressings, a string course, modillioned eaves, and a slate roof. There are two storeys and a basement, and a front of seven bays, with a gable above the middle three bays. In the centre is a rectangular stone porch with a round-headed arch, a cornice and a balustraded parapet. In the left bay is a single-storey canted bay window, and in the right bay is a two-storey canted bay window. The windows have flat-arched heads; some are sashes, and some have altered glazing.	II
St Chad's Church and presbytery 53.49231°N 2.23991°W		1846–47	A Roman Catholic church and attached presbytery designed by Weightman and Hadfield in Perpendicular style, built in sandstone with slate roofs. The church consists of a nave with a clerestory, north and south aisles, a chancel with north and south chapels, and a northwest tower. The tower has three stages, a southwest stair turret rising to a greater height with a tall crocketed pinnacle, and an embattled parapet with crocketed pinnacles. There are niches with statues in the second stage of the tower and in the stair turret. The presbytery has two storeys, a basement and an attic, and contains arched windows and doorways.	II
Churchyard walls, St Chad's Church; 53.49245°N 2.24015°W	—	c. 1847	The walls are in sandstone, and enclose the north and west sides of the churchyard, continuing on the east side of the presbytery. They contain two gateways on the west side and one on the north, all with wooden gates.	II
Former Cheetham Town Hall; 53.49372°N 2.23991°W		1853–1855	The town hall, later used for other purposes, is in red brick on a stone plinth, with sandstone dressings, rusticated quoins, a sill band, a prominent modillioned eaves cornice, and hipped slate roofs. It is in Italianate style, with two tall storeys. There is a symmetrical front of seven bays, the outer two bays on each side lower and recessed. On the ground floor are round-headed windows and a central doorway with decorative surrounds. The upper floor contains sash windows in architraves, the central window with a cornice on consoles. In front of the building is a three-bay iron porte-cochère with a glazed roof, and a wrought iron balcony at the rear.	II
Former Cheetham Town Hall annexe 53.49395°N 2.23977°W	—	1861–62	An office, at one time an annexe to the town hall, in red brick on a plinth, with sandstone dressings, two friezes, one lettered, a modillioned cornice, a parapet with balustrades, and a hipped slate roof. It has a rectangular plan and is in Italianate style. There is a symmetrical front with a central block of two storeys and three bays, and single-storey single-bay wings. On the front is a porch with pairs of fluted columns with debased Ionic capitals, a bracketed cornice, and a panelled parapet. On the ground floor are square-headed windows, and on the upper floor the windows have round heads, all with architraves. The outer bays contain Venetian windows with elaborate surrounds and urn finials.	II
Derby Brewery Arms; 53.49308°N 2.24024°W		Mid to late 19th century	Formerly the Knowsley Hotel, later a public house and shop, it is in red brick on a plinth, with sandstone dressings, quoins, sill bands, a bracketed cornice, and a parapet. There are three storeys and cellars, and the public house has a symmetrical front of five bays. In the centre is a round-headed doorway with Ionic pilasters, a fanlight, and a modillioned cornice. The ground floor windows have elliptical moulded heads, set-in shafts, panelled aprons, and altered glazing. On the upper floors are sash windows; on the middle floor they have elliptical heads, and on the top floor round heads. To the right is a three-bay shop with similar features, narrower bays, and altered glazing.	II
St John's Church; 53.50513°N 2.24257°W		1869–1871	The church was designed by Paley and Austin, and is built in sandstone with red tiled roofs. It consists of a nave and a chancel in one cell, with a clerestory, north and south aisles, a west porch, an apse at the east end, and a southwest tower. The tower has four stages, clasping corner pilasters with pyramidal roofs, a south doorway, a west window, and a pyramidal mansard roof. Most of the windows in the body of the church are lancets.	II*
Former Free Library; 53.49322°N 2.23947°W		1876	The former library is in yellow brick with gritstone dressings, pilasters, a lettered frieze, a prominent cornice, and a parapet with a balustraded centre and segmental-pedimented panelled upstands. It has a rectangular plan and is in Italianate style. There are two storeys and a basement, and a symmetrical front of three bays, with six bays in the left return. Steps lead up to a central square-headed doorway, and above is an arcade of round-headed windows. Each of the outer bays has a square-headed window on the upper floor with a pedimented architrave.	II
Cheetham Park shelter 53.49956°N 2.24321°W		1884	The park shelter has a hexagonal plan, and consists of six cast iron columns carrying a timber roof with cladding in bands of Welsh and Westmorland slate. The columns have fluted pedestals, round shafts, and capitals with floral decoration. The roof is conical and on the apex is a weathervane.	II
Jewish Museum; 53.49568°N 2.23805°W		1889	Originally a synagogue designed by Edward Salomons, and later converted into a museum, it is in red brick on a plinth, with sandstone dressings, an ornamental band, and a slate roof. It has a T-shaped plan, with the main body at right angles to the street, and wings flanking at the front. The front is symmetrical, with two storeys and three bays. In the centre is a round-arched doorway with shafts, a banded lintel, and polychrome voussoirs. Above it is an arcaded five-light window, a cinquefoil motif, and a gable with dentilled coping and a finial. The outer bays have gables at the sides with finials. Along the sides are segmental-headed windows on the ground floor, and circular windows above.	II*
Bandstand; 53.49867°N 2.24371°W		c. 1890	The bandstand is in Cheetham Park. It has a hexagonal plan, a brick plinth, cast iron columns, wrought iron railings, and a swept slate roof with a finial. On the railings are Art Nouveau-style panels in the form of inverted hearts.	II
Bus Depot and Transport Museum; 53.50161°N 2.23341°W		1901	Originally an electric tram depot, later a bus depot, and then a transport museum. It is in red brick with some stone dressings and a slate roof. There is an office block at the front and a tram shed behind. It has two storeys, 15 bays and a wide splayed corner. The corner contains a wide round-headed window with a chamfered surround, voussoirs, and a carved keystone, with a clock face above. The windows vary; some are semicircular with gabled half-dormers above, and others have square heads.	II
Former Hot Shots snooker club 53.50829°N 2.24115°W	—	1906	The billiard hall, later used for other purposes, has an internal timber frame, walls of roughcast brick, and tiled roofs. The entrance front has two storeys, and the hall has one. There are three bays, the outer bays narrow. On the upper storey of the central bay is a Venetian-style window, and the segmental-arched roof has a modillioned cornice. The outer bays have pilasters with Art Nouveau ornament and rise to turrets with swept pyramidal roofs.	II
Church of St Matthew with St Mary; 53.51849°N 2.23466°W		1908–1910	The church is in stone, and in late Perpendicular style. It consists of a nave with a clerestory, north and south aisles, a west baptistry, a chancel with transepts and a north vestry, and a northwest tower. The tower has angle buttresses and an embattled parapet, and there is a polygonal stair turret adjoining the baptistry. The east window has five lights, and the west window has three.	II
Crumpsall and Cheetham District Library and railings 53.51164°N 2.24449°W		1909–1911	The library, now closed, is in red brick and limestone, with quoins and a stone parapet, and is in Edwardian Baroque style. There is one storey and a basement, and a symmetrical front of three bays, the outer bays being projecting wings. In the centre is a porch with a round-headed doorway, a voluted keystone, an architrave with paired columns, an open pediment, and a hemi-spherical roof. In the wings are round-headed windows, modilliond open pediments, quoined pilasters, and lettered cartouches. The basement area is protected by wrought iron railings with limestone piers.	II
St Chad's Cheetham Hill First World War Memorial Cross; 53.49221°N 2.24021°W		c. 1920	The war memorial is in the churchyard of St Chad's Church, and is in grey granite. It consists of a wheel head cross on a pyramidal base and a slightly tapering plinth, and is about 2.5 metres (8 ft 2 in) tall. On the cross head is knotwork carving to the arms, a central relief of Christ's head crowned with thorns, and lettering. The base has a relief of a winged Victory vanquishing a serpent, and it contains an inscription relating to the First World War.	II
Lower Crumpsall War Memorial; 53.51097°N 2.22484°W		1920s (probable)	The war memorial is in the churchyard of the Church of St Thomas with St Mark, to the east of the church, and is in red sandstone. It consists of a square column on a plinth of two steps, with a carved gableted top surmounted by a foliate cross. The column contains panels with inscriptions and the names of those lost in the First World War.	II
