= Dearden Fold Farmhouse =

Listed building near Ainsworth, Greater Manchester, England

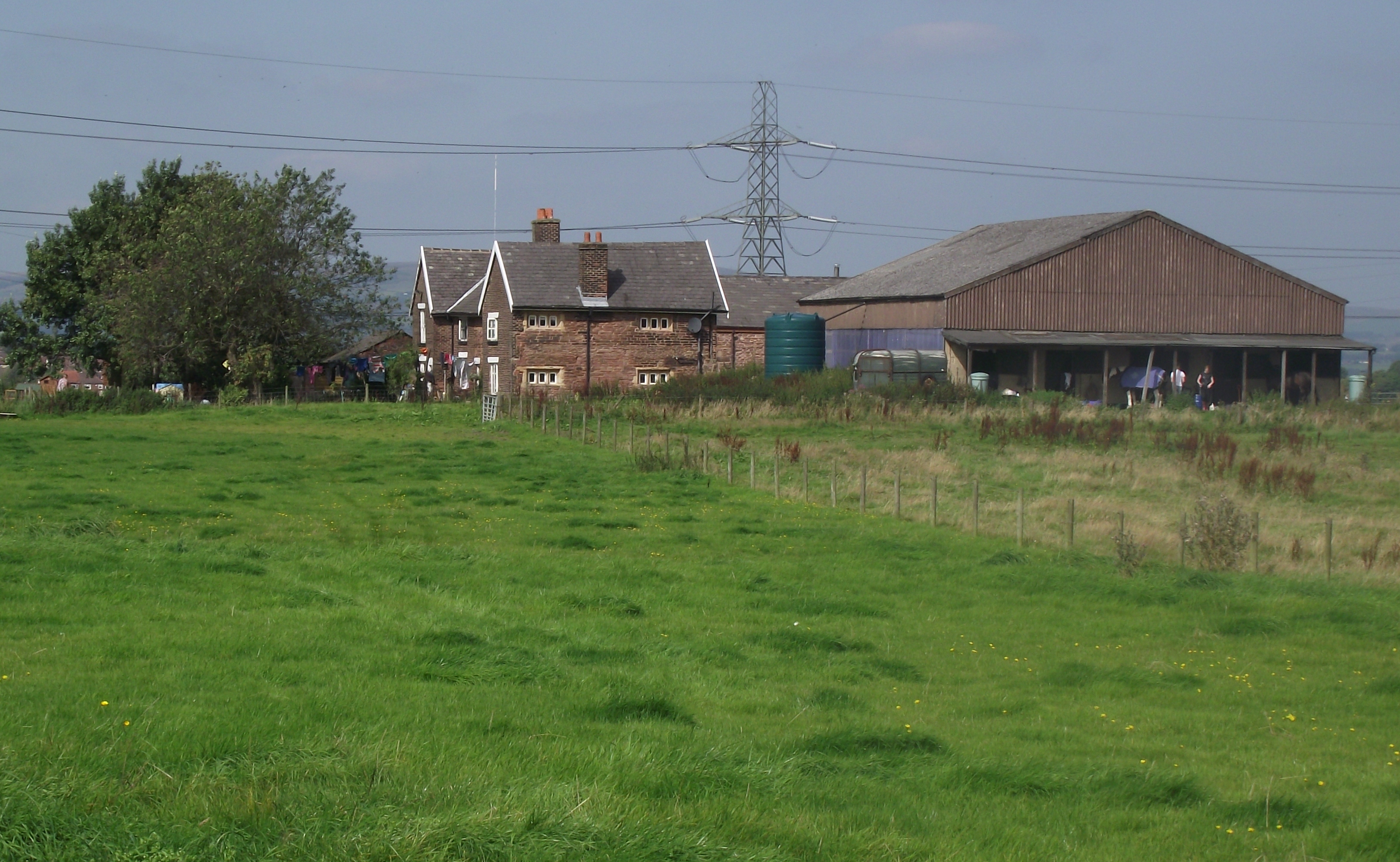
- Dearden Fold Farm in 2013

- Location within Greater Manchester

General information
- Location: Bury Old Road, Ainsworth, Greater Manchester, England
- Coordinates: 53.5875°N 2.3664°W
- Year built: 16th century (probable)

Listed Building – Grade II*
- Official name: Dearden Fold Farmhouse
- Designated: 29 January 1985
- Reference no.: 1356793

Dearden Fold Farmhouse is a Grade II* listed building on Bury Old Road near Ainsworth, a village in the Metropolitan Borough of Bury, Greater Manchester, England. Believed to date from the late 15th century, with dendrochronology indicating a primary construction phase around 1488, it began as a hall house and was substantially altered during the 16th and 17th centuries. The property was historically associated with the Dearden family, prominent local landowners in the 17th century, and later underwent a five‑year restoration after being placed on the Buildings at Risk Register in the late 20th century.

== History ==
The farmhouse is believed to originally date from the late 15th century, with dendrochronological analysis of its oak timbers indicating a primary construction phase around 1488. Originally built as a hall house, it underwent substantial alterations during the 16th and 17th centuries, including the insertion of an upper floor and later additions to form its current layout.

The property was historically associated with the Dearden family, prominent landowners in the area during the 17th century. Records from the Bury Archaeological Group indicate that the estate passed through several generations, with notable transactions in the 1670s linking it to George Dearden of Haslingden.

On 29 January 1985, Dearden Fold Farmhouse was designated a Grade II* listed building.

In the late 20th century, the building was placed on English Heritage's Buildings at Risk Register, but a five-year restoration programme has since stabilised its condition.

== Architecture ==
Dearden Fold Farmhouse is a timber-framed building with stone walls, parts of which were later rebuilt in brown brick, and it is topped with a stone-slab roof. The structure comprises two storeys and four bays, with the outer bays slightly projecting and finished with gables. A distinctive gabled porch marks the entrance, featuring a studded, cross-boarded door fitted with ornamental strap hinges.

=== Interior ===
Internally, the farmhouse preserves several notable medieval features. These include massive bevelled beams supported by moulded corbels, as well as a timber-framed cross wall filled with wattle and daub panels. One of the most striking elements is the upper portion of a pointed arch made from hewn timbers, complete with a carved boss at its apex. Other historic details include a Tudor-style six-panel door and later additions such as cupboards with fielded panels and traditional H-hinges.

== See also ==
- Grade II* listed buildings in Greater Manchester
- Listed buildings in Radcliffe, Greater Manchester
