= Spanish and Portuguese Synagogue =

Spanish and Portuguese Synagogue may refer to:

- Bevis Marks Synagogue, in the City of London, England
- Congregation Shearith Israel, often called The Spanish and Portuguese Synagogue, in New York
- Congregation Mikveh Israel, Philadelphia
- Spanish and Portuguese Synagogue (Manchester), a former synagogue, now museum, in Manchester, England
- Spanish and Portuguese Synagogue of Montreal
- Portuguese Synagogue (Amsterdam)

For other Spanish and Portuguese synagogues, see Spanish and Portuguese Jews#Communities, past and present
