= John Lee (British actor) =

English actor and manager of plays

John Lee (1725–1781) was an English actor and manager of plays.

== Life ==
He is first heard of at the theatre in Leman Street, Goodman's Fields, London where he played, on 13 November 1745, Sir Charles Freeman in The Beaux' Stratagem. His name appears, 14 November 1747, at Drury Lane under Garrick, as the Bastard (i.e. Edmund) in King Lear, and 3 December as Myrtle in The Conscious Lovers.

Breaking his engagement with Garrick he made his first appearance at Covent Garden, 23 October 1749, as Ranger in The Suspicious Husband by Benjamin Hoadly. The beginning of the next season saw him still at Covent Garden, where he played, 31 October 1750, Granger in The Refusal by Colley Cibber.

Garrick, however, compelled Lee to return to Drury Lane, where he reappeared, 27 December 1750, as George Barnwell in The London Merchant. Here he remained during this and the following season, playing secondary characters, except when he was allowed for his benefit on one occasion to enact Hamlet and Poet in Lethe, and on another, Lear and Don Quixote. On 23 February 1751, he was the original Earl of Devon in Mallet's Alfred.

A man of extreme and aggressive vanity and of quarrelsome disposition, he fumed under the management of Garrick, who seems to have enjoyed keeping in the background an actor who was always disputing his supremacy. In 1752, Lee went accordingly to Edinburgh for the purpose of purchasing and managing the Canongate Concert Hall. Through the interest of Lord Elibank and other patrons, he obtained the house on exceptionally easy terms. He proved himself a good manager, reformed many abuses, and is said to have been the first to raise the status and morale of the Edinburgh stage. He set his face against gentlemen occupying seats on the stage or being admitted behind the scenes, and made improvements in decorations and scenery. Romeo and Juliet was played in December 1752, and is held by Mr. Dibdin, the historian of the Edinburgh stage, to have probably been the unprinted version with which the memory of Lee is discredited.

In the summer Lee travelled with his company, and lost, he says, £500. Unable to pay the third instalment of the purchase-money for the theatre, he applied to Lord Elibank, who, with some friends, advanced money upon an assignment of the theatre, which Lee was reluctantly compelled to grant. In February a disagreement arose between Lee and the 'gentlemen' who had advanced him money, and the theatre was seized by the creditors, who, waiting for an excuse to quarrel with Lee, had already engaged West Digges as manager. Lee was thrown into prison and his furniture sold. He lost an action which he brought against Lord Elibank, Andrew Pringle, John Dalrymple, and others, and quit Edinburgh for Dublin, where he was engaged by Thomas Sheridan for £400 for the season.

He now swallowed his pride, and once more enlisted under Garrick at Drury Lane, making, as Pierre in Venice Preserv'd 'his first appearance for ten years.' He competed, unsuccessfully, in 1766-67 for the patent of the Edinburgh Theatre. In 1769, and probably in subsequent years, he was at Bath.

In 1775 he appeared in the first production of Richard Brinsley Sheridan's debut play, The Rivals. This was poorly received, and Lee's performance as Sir Lucius O'Trigger was criticised for rendering the character "ridiculous and disgusting". Sheridan rewrote the play and presented it again a few days later, with Laurence Clinch replacing Lee in the role.

In 1778–89, he managed the theatre at Bath. In 1780 he was too ill to act, and he died in 1781.

== Family ==
Lee's wife died early. By her he had five daughters, two of whom, Harriet Lee and Sophia Lee became celebrated writers. His only son, George Augustus Lee (1761–1826), was a partner in a well-known firm of Manchester cotton-spinners (Phillips & Lee).
