= Church of St John the Evangelist, Cheetham Hill =

Coordinates: 53.5051°N 2.2426°W

Church of St John the Evangelist, Cheetham
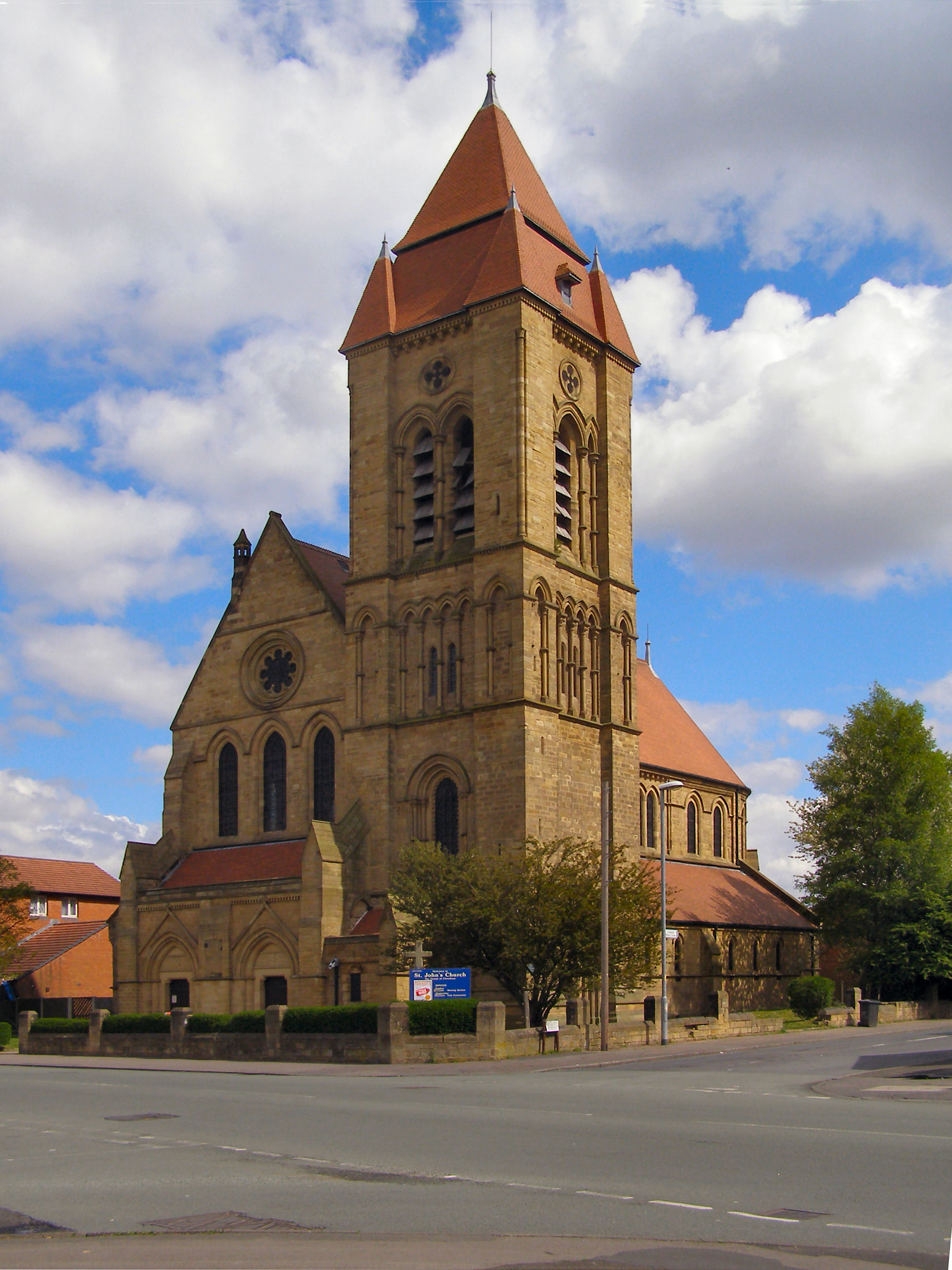
- St John's from the southwest

- Location in Greater Manchester
- OS grid reference: SD 840,010
- Location: Waterloo Road, Cheetham Hill, Manchester
- Country: England
- Denomination: Anglican
- Website: St John the Evangelist, Cheetham

History
- Status: Parish church
- Dedication: Saint John the Evangelist

Architecture
- Functional status: Active
- Heritage designation: Grade II*
- Designated: 3 October 1974
- Architect: Paley and Austin
- Architectural type: Church
- Style: Norman Revival, Gothic Revival
- Groundbreaking: 1869
- Completed: 1871
- Construction cost: £10,000 (estimated)

Specifications
- Materials: Sandstone, tiled roofs

Administration
- Province: York
- Diocese: Manchester
- Archdeaconry: Manchester
- Deanery: North Manchester
- Parish: St John the Evangelist, Cheetham

Clergy
- Vicar: Revd Daniel J. A. Burton

The Church of St John the Evangelist is in Waterloo Road, Cheetham Hill, Manchester, England. It is an active Anglican parish church in the deanery of North Manchester, the archdeaconry of Manchester, and the diocese of Manchester. The church is recorded in the National Heritage List for England as a designated Grade II* listed building.

== History ==
The church was built between 1869 and 1871, and designed by the Lancaster architects Paley and Austin. Its estimated cost was £10,000 (equivalent to £1,020,000 in 2025), and was paid for by Lewis Loyd, a member of the banking house of Jones Loyd and Company of London. As originally built, the church seated 600 people. The west porch was added in 1894.

== Architecture ==
=== Exterior ===
St John's is constructed in sandstone with tiled roofs. Its architectural style is a combination of Romanesque and Early English. The plan consists of a three-bay nave and a two-bay apsidal chancel, with no structural division between them, north and south aisles, a west porch, and a southwest tower. The tower is in four stages with clasping pilasters at the corners rising to pinnacles with pyramidal roofs; the tower itself also has a large pyramidal roof. In the bottom stage is a round-headed south doorway, and in the next stage is a single-light west window. The third stage contains blank arcading with two central lancet windows on each side, and the top stage has coupled and louvred bell openings. At the west end of the nave is a two-bay porch containing a double doorway flanked by large buttresses. Over the porch are three lancet windows, with a multifoil window above them. Most of the windows in the body of the church are lancets.

=== Interior ===
The interior of the church is lined in bricks with stone dressings. The piers of the north arcade have a quatrefoil plan, and those of the south arcade are octagonal. At the east end of the north aisle is the organ loft, and there is a chapel at the east end of the south aisle. The wooden pulpit is carved with sunflowers and leaves, anticipating motifs used by Art Nouveau. The large sculpted reredos was installed in 1879. Also in the apse are mosaic panels, and the chancel is floored with encaustic tiles. The stained glass includes windows by C. E. Kempe with depictions of saints, leaders of the church and Sir Philip Sidney. The three-manual pipe organ was made by Hill and Son, and rebuilt in 1895 by A. Young.

== See also ==
- Grade II* listed buildings in Greater Manchester
- Listed buildings in Manchester-M8
- List of ecclesiastical works by Paley and Austin
