= Joseph Holt's Brewery =

Brewery in Manchester, England

Joseph Holt Ltd
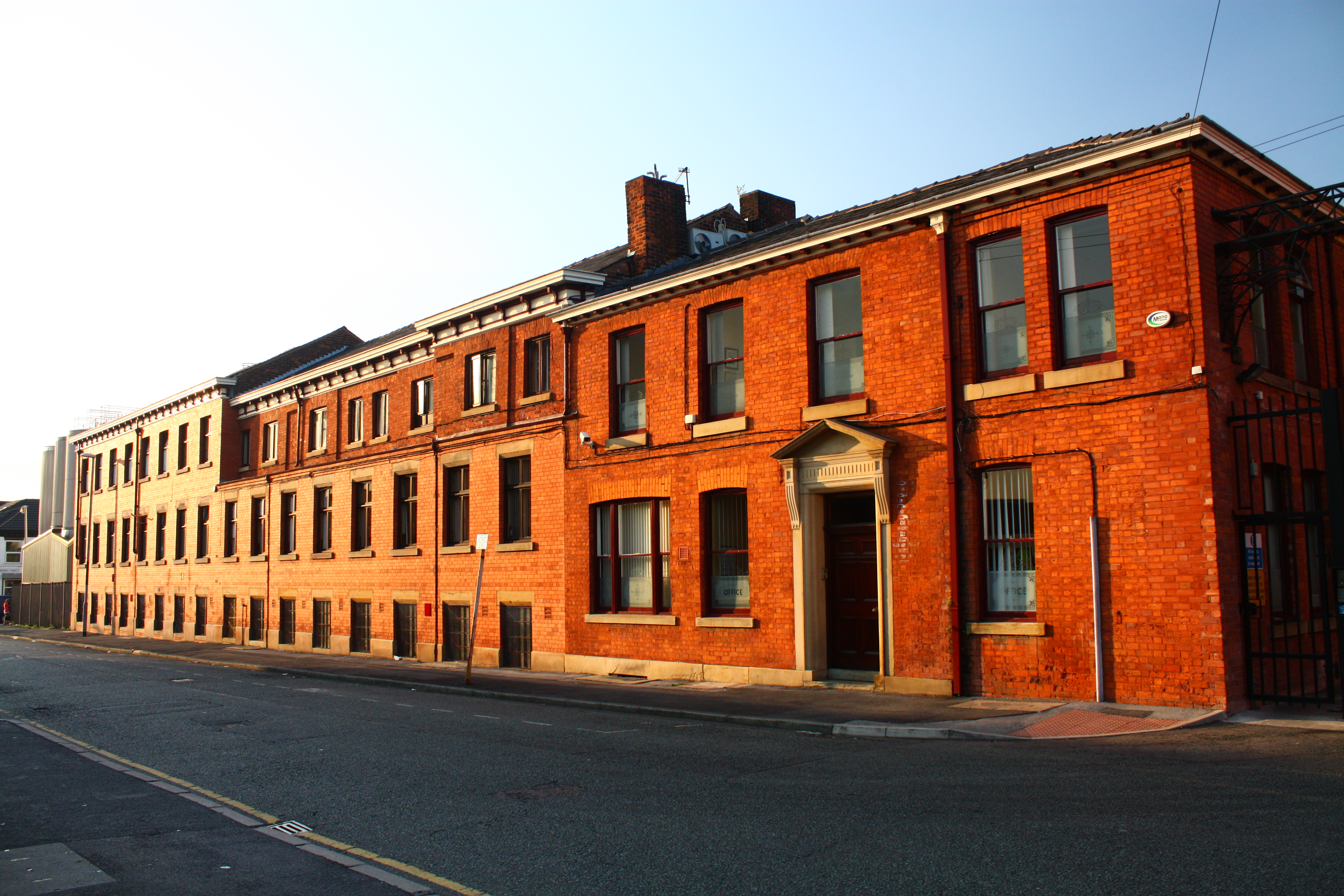
- Joseph Holt Brewery on Empire Street, Manchester
- Type: Brewery
- Industry: Brewing
- Founded: 1849
- Founder: Joseph Holt
- Headquarters: Manchester, England
- Number of locations: 127 pubs (2019)
- Area served: North West England
- Key people: Richard Kershaw (CEO)
- Products: Beer
- Brands: Bitter, Two Hoots, Black Crystal, Diamond, Crystal Gold, Humdinger, Sixex
- Services: Public houses, beer wholesaler
- Parent: Joseph Holt Limited
- Subsidiaries: Touchwood Limited; Bootleg Brewing Co.
- Website: Joseph Holt

Joseph Holt is a brewery in Manchester, England, founded in 1849, which has been owned by the same family for six generations. It owns 127 pubs in Greater Manchester and the North West and its beers are supplied to over 500 nationally.

== Brewery ==
Joseph Holt have brewed on their site in Cheetham, north of Manchester city centre, since 1860. Ale and lager malts are delivered in bulk loads and stored in silos, while speciality malts continue to be delivered in sacks. Between 15 and 500 barrels (4,500–150,000 pints) can be brewed per day, and a hopback is still in use, along with traditional whole leaf hops, to collect and clarify wort after boiling. All ales are top fermented in enclosed square fermenters using a historic yeast strain, while lagers are fermented and conditioned in modern cylindroconical vessels. Joseph Holt have their own borehole on the brewery site to abstract brewing liquor (water) and are one of only a handful of brewers in the UK still to rack into 36 gallon casks, as well as hogsheads, the largest barrel size, carrying 432 pints (54 imperial gallons; 250 L) and weighing roughly 660 pounds (300 kg) when full.

== History ==
Joseph Holt, the son of a weaver, was born in 1813 in Unsworth, a textile village near Bury. He worked as a carter at Harrison's Strangeways Brewery. In 1849 he married Catherine Parry, who helped finance a small brewery behind a pub on Oak Street, Manchester.

In 1860, he purchased the brewery site on Empire Street, Cheetham. His reputation in Manchester endures; in 2007, readers of the Manchester Evening News voted him "People's Champion" in the "Greatest ever Business Leaders" awards. In 1882, by which time he had established a chain of 20 public houses, Joseph passed control of the brewery to his son Edward. Edward Holt was later knighted, served as Lord Mayor of Manchester from 1907 to 1909 and was made a baronet in 1916. He died in 1928 and the company passed to his son, Edward; it is still in the hands of the same family.

For more than thirty years, Peter Kershaw, a former rackets and real tennis champion and a notoriously economical man, was chairman of the brewery. His son, Richard Kershaw, the great-grandson of the founder, joined him on the board in 1980 and, since the death of his father, in 2000, has been the chief executive.

== Charitable work ==
The company has a long-standing relationship with the Christie Hospital and the Holt Radium Institute in Manchester. This dates back to Sir Edward Holt, the great-grandfather of the current Chief Executive who founded the Holt Radium Institute in 1914.

In 2018, Joseph Holt received the British Beer and Pub Association's Heart of the Community award for the third year in a row, following campaigns to raise money for the Christie and Maggie's Centre. In 2017 the All Party Parliamentary Beer Group awarded Joseph Holt the National Pub Aid award for their support to the community.

== Beers ==
Holt's Bitter

=== Draught ===
- Joseph Holt's Bitter
- Joseph Holt's Mild
- Joseph Holt's Smooth (nitrokeg bitter)
- Joseph Holt's Black (nitrokeg mild)
- Joseph Holt's IPA
- Joseph Holt's Two Hoots
- Joseph Holt's Humdinger
- Joseph Holt's Crystal lager
- Joseph Holt's Crystal Cold
- Joseph Holt's Crystal Gold
- Joseph Holt's Diamond lager
- Joseph Holt's Trailblazer Stout

=== Bottled ===
- Humdinger
- 1849
- Touchwood
- Maple Moon
- Sixex
- Thunderholt
- Fifth Sense
- Two Hoots (4.2 ABV)
- Bitter
- Maple Gold

Canned

- Holt's Bitter
- Holtenbrau
