= Cheetham Town Hall =

Listed building in Manchester, England

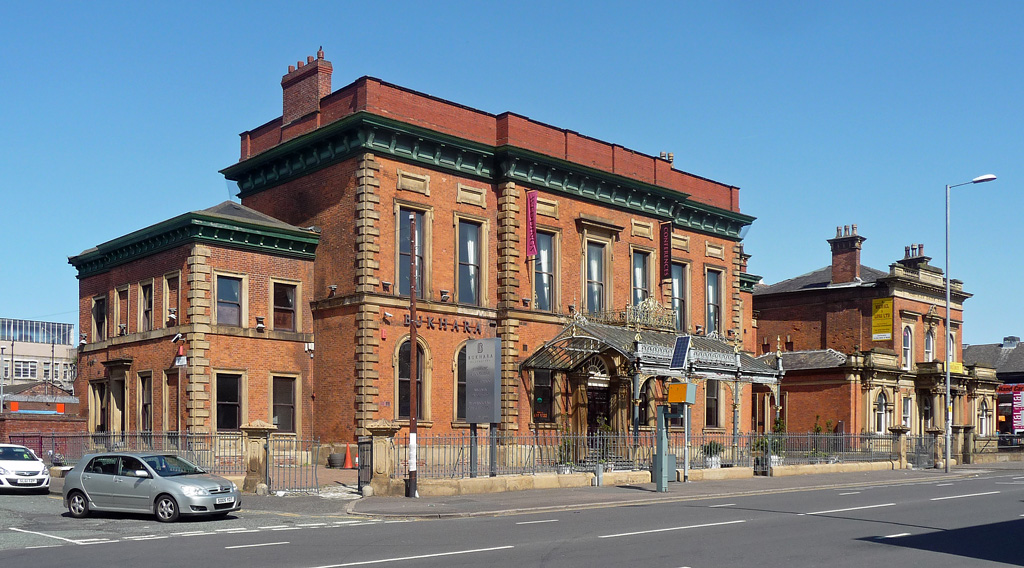
- Cheetham Town Hall with the annexe on the far right

General information
- Architectural style: Italianate style
- Location: Cheetham Hill Road, Cheetham, Manchester, England
- Coordinates: 53.4937°N 2.2400°W
- Year(s) built: 1855

Design and construction
- Architect(s): Thomas Bird
- Designations

Listed Building – Grade II
- Official name: Cheetham Town Hall (Former)
- Designated: 3 October 1974
- Reference no.: 1208440

Cheetham Town Hall is a former municipal building in Cheetham Hill Road, Cheetham, Manchester, England. The structure, which now operates as a restaurant, is a Grade II listed building.

== History ==
The building was commissioned as a town hall for the township of Cheetham in the mid-19th century. It was designed by Thomas Bird in the Italianate style, built in red brick with stone dressings and was officially opened on 5 January 1855.

The design involved a symmetrical main frontage of five bays facing onto Cheetham Hill Road. The building also included recessed side wings of two bays each which were lower than the main frontage. The central section of three bays, which was slightly projected forward, featured a doorway with a fanlight flanked by pilasters supporting an entablature with triglyphs. In front of the central section, there was a porte-cochère with iron columns supporting a glazed roof decorated by iron openwork and finials. The other bays on the ground floor were fenestrated by round headed windows with architraves and keystones, while the bays on the first floor were fenestrated by tall sash windows with architraves. The central window on the first floor was surmounted by a cornice supported by brackets while, above the other first floor windows, there were rectangular stone panels. At roof level, there was a prominent cornice supported by brackets with a parapet above. Internally, the principal room was the upper hall with a semi-circular end wall. Local authors, Jean and John Bradbury, have commented on the "fine iron porch". The architectural historian, Nikolaus Pevsner also liked the additional ornamentation, observing that "austerity is offset by the delicate iron porte-cochère in front of the central entrance."

A new building, commissioned to accommodate the Prestwich Union Offices, was erected to the immediate northeast of the town hall in 1862. The building was designed in the same style and built with the same construction materials but was only three bays wide with single storey wings on either side. It featured a prominent stone porch formed by Doric order columns supporting an entablature. The Prestwich Poor Law Union administered welfare in the area from 1850 to 1915, after which the offices were used as an annexe to the town hall. There was also a Cheetham Committee of Manchester Borough Council, which used the town hall for its meetings, until 1875.

The town hall was extensively used for public meetings. In the 19th century, it was the meeting place for the parliamentary debating society for north Manchester. The future Prime Minister, Winston Churchill, addressed a meeting of the Free Trade League in the town hall during the 1906 general election. The town hall was also used by the Jewish Community for Zionist bazaars and similar events, and, in January 1937, it was the venue for a large meeting of members of the British Union of Fascists. Some thirty different anti-fascist organisations unsuccessfully tried to prevent the meeting from taking place.

After the building became surplus to requirements it was sold for alternative use. In the 1970s, it became an evangelist church operated by the New Testament Church of God. It continued in that use until the end of the century but, in the early 21st century, it became an Indian restaurant, known as the Saffron Grill and, following refurbishment, it reopened as Bukhara Manchester in 2016.

== See also ==
- Listed buildings in Manchester-M8
