= Cheetham Hill Road =

Street in Manchester, United Kingdom

- Bury Old Road (part)
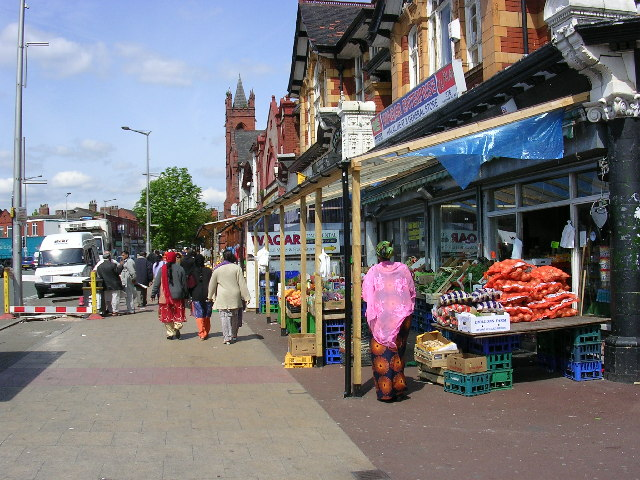
- Cheetham Hill Road
- Interactive map of Cheetham Hill Road
- Former name(s): York Street, Cheetham (part)
- Length: 5 mi (8.0 km)
- Location: Red Bank, Cheetwood, Cheetham, Cheetham Hill, Collyhurst, Crumpsall, Heaton Park, Prestwich
- Postal code: M4, M7, M8, M25, M45
- Coordinates: 53.5121°N 2.2438°W
- Northern end: Whitefield, Bury
- Major junctions: A665
- Southern end: Corporation Street

Cheetham Hill Road is a road in north Manchester, England, running from Corporation Street in Manchester city centre, through Cheetham to Prestwich. In Crumpsall, its name changes to Bury Old Road.

== Route ==
Cheetham Hill Road and Bury Old Road are part of the designated A665. Cheetham Hill Road starts at the junction of the A6042 Corporation Street and the A665 Miller Street. It crosses the culverted River Irk to the east of Victoria Station. At its junction with New Bridge Street, it turns north-northeast and is straight for 1 km, to the A6010 Queen's Road (east side). This stretch was called York Street until about 1900. Cheetham Hill Road leads from here to the community of Cheetham Hill, where at Bourget Street and Crescent Road (formerly Sandy Lane), Cheetham Hill Road becomes Bury Old Road. This is the boundary between Manchester and Salford, and between postcodes M8 and M7. To the north-west is Crumpsall and to the south-east is Broughton Park. It crosses the A567 Middleton Road and passes into Prestwich, in the M25 postcode area. To the east is Heaton Park, and to the west Heaton Park Metrolink station. Bury Old Road passes over the M60 motorway and under the Bury metrolink tram line at Besses o' th' Barn Metrolink station. At Whitefield Bury Old Road joins with A56 Bury New Road, the 1827 toll road that was built to replace it.

Bury New Road is a feeder to junction 17 of the M60 (formerly M62), the trans-Pennine motorway and, here, the Manchester ring road.

== History ==
Roman Manchester ran from the castrum (fort) at the Medlock crossing in Castlefield, along Deansgate to the crossing of the River Irk at the foot of Red Bank. Cheetham Hill Road starts at the River Irk crossing. The course of the Roman road has not been determined, though it is likely that there was a path that followed Red Bank up the sandstone river cliff following the gentle gradient that was preferred by draught animals. Cheetham, with its other spelling Chetham is an interesting name, the first syllable is a Celtic pre-Roman given name, while the suffix ham, meaning settlement has a Mercian or Northumbrian post-Roman name. Almost all Manchester placename are post-Roman; this implies that Cheetham was of sufficient importance in Roman times for the Celtic name to survive. .

In the Middle Ages, the land was ceded to Roger de Midleton who leased it to Henry de Chetham. A descendant was Humphrey Chetham who was born at Crumpsall Hall in 1580. Crumpsall Hall, which stood at the junction of Cheetham Hill Road, Sandy Lane (Crescent Road) and Humphrey Street, was demolished in 1825. A new Crumpsall Hall was built in Crumpsall Park 300m away.

Another important estate was Stocks, at the corner of Elizabeth Street and Cheetham Hill Road. At Stocks, the main road into Manchester passed by North Street and Red Bank and over the bridge into Long Millgate. A new road called York Street cut through from here to New Bridge Street and the Miller Street-Corporation Street junction. York Street was renamed Cheetham Hill Road around the turn of the nineteenth century due to the large number of York Streets in central Manchester. York Street and its parallel streets were a planned development with elements of a gridiron structure.

In the late 1830s, the very wealthy were living in villas in Crumpsall, leaving the a range of relatively cheap and spacious houses along York Street that were ideal for the traders with retail properties in town, and along Deansgate. The Jewish community had expanded into retailing-taking the skill of the hawker into fixed shops. Jacob Frank, an optician, opened a shop at 114 Deansgate, where 8 of his 11 sons became opticians: the three others moved away to open different shops in Leeds and Hull. Benjamin Hyam, who opened his Pantechnethica at 26 Market Street in April 1841 moved to Higher Broughton. Successful retailers moved from garrets above their shops in town to the new inner suburbs. Joseph Braham moved onto York Street in 1841 and bought other houses which he tenanted with his co-religionists. By 1845 there were 12 Jewish retailers living along York Street or close by. In 1858, two synagogues opened on York Street, the Great Synagogue and the Reformed Synagogue.

A classic hawker to shop trader story is that of Joseph and Adelina Davis who left Chodziez in Poland in 1857 and came with their children Nathan, Aaron, Elkan, David and Theresa to Manchester where they started out hawking jewellery around the north. Later, they established Davis jewellers shop in Deansgate. Two of Elkan's sons, Louis Henry Davis and Michael Joseph Davis, ran an antiques business on Long Millgate and lived at 453 Cheetham Hill Road. In July 1933, their Manchester-born sister Frances (Fanny) Levin was brutally attacked with an iron bar taken from the kitchen grate. She died of her injuries at the Jewish Memorial Hospital. A homeless former sailor, Billy Burtoft, was convicted of her murder and was executed at Strangeways prison, but, according to research carried out by local author Denise Beddows, Burtoft was almost certainly innocent of the crime. 453 Cheetham Hill Road was demolished in 1958 and, the Cheetham Hebrew Congregation Synagogue was built on the site but this later became the Al-Hirah centre, housing a travel agent, immigration law centre and beauty parlour.

== Buildings ==
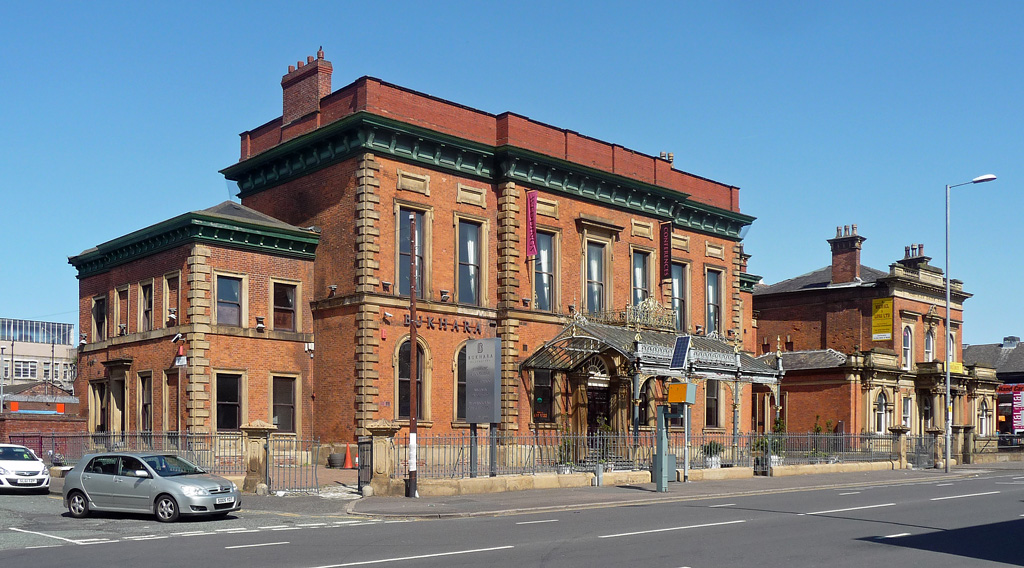
Cheetham Town Hall

=== Offices ===
- The Peninsula, a 13 storey office block opposite New Bridge Street, completed in 2009 with 148,890 square feet (13,832 m^{2}) of office space.

=== Civic buildings ===
- Cheetham Town Hall, by Thomas Bird 1856. A palazzo style building
- Assembly Rooms by Mills and Murgatroyd 1858, with a double cube ballroom 80 feet (24 m) by 40 feet (12 m). It had a Louis XV interior designed by John Gregory Crace and was demolished in 1966.
- Crumpsall Library

=== Places of worship ===
==== Churches ====
- Church of St John the Evangelist, Cheetham, Waterloo Road (1869–71); architects Paley & Austin
- St Chad's, York Street, Cheetham Hill Road (1846–47) architects Weightman & Hadfield; the earliest post-Reformation Roman Catholic church to establish itself in Manchester.
- St Luke's Church (1836–39) by Thomas Witlam Atkinson, Grade II listed.

==== Synagogues ====
- The Great Synagogue (Old Congregation), Cheetham Hill Road, Cheetham (SJ 842998) was designed by Thomas Bird; opened on 14 March 1858, and closed in 1974. It was demolished in 1986. It was built in the Italian manner with large Corinthian columns and pilasters.
- Congregation of British Jews (Manchester Reform Synagogue), Park Place, Cheetham Hill Road was designed by Edward Salomons. The original building in Park Place was consecrated on 25 March 1858 but was lost during the 1 June 1941 blitz.
- Spanish and Portuguese Synagogue was designed by Edward Salomons. 1873-74. Standing but closed in 1983 when it became the Manchester Jewish Museum.
- The New Congregation Synagogue, Cheetham Hill Road (formerly York Street), Cheetham.(SJ 842997) was opened in 1889, but now used as business premises.
- Central Synagogue, Park Street, Park Street / Cheetham Hill Road, Cheetham (SJ 840992) became the Central Synagogue in 1894. Now used as business premises. The new Central Synagogue is located in Heywood Street, Cheetham (SD 842010) and was built in 1928.
- United Synagogue, Cheetham Hill Road, Cheetham (SJ 842997) opened in 1904 in a converted Methodist Chapel; it was demolished in 1987.
- Higher Crumpsall and Higher Broughton Hebrew Congregation. Magnificent stone-white building still in use

==== Mosques ====
- Al-Sunnah Mosque: 13 Winterford Road, Cheetham Hill, Manchester, M8 9PD.

== Public transport ==
The 135 Manchester-Bury bus runs the entire length of the road. The lower end, from Corporation Street to Thomas Street, is also served by the 42. On other parts of the road, the 51A, 149, 154 and 167 services run.

== See also ==
- List of streets and roads in Manchester
