= The New Peerage =

- Original language: English
- Written by: Harriet Lee
- Genre: Comedy

Premiere
- Date: 10 November 1787
- Place: Theatre Royal, Drury Lane

The New Peerage is a 1787 comedy play by the British writer Harriet Lee.

The original cast included Thomas King as Mr Vandercrap, John Bannister as Lord Melville, Richard Suett as Sir John Lovelace, John Hayman Packer as Medley, John Phillimore as Allen, Richard Wroughton as Charles, Anna Maria Crouch as Miss Harley and Elizabeth Farren as Lady Charlotte Courteney. The prologue was written by Richard Cumberland.

== Bibliography ==
- Nicoll, Allardyce. A History of English Drama 1660-1900: Volume III. Cambridge University Press, 2009.
- Hogan, C.B (ed.) The London Stage, 1660-1800: Volume V. Southern Illinois University Press, 1968.
