= Canterbury Tales (Harriet and Sophia Lee) =

Collection of stories by Harriet Lee and Sophia Lee

Canterbury Tales is a collection of short stories and novellas, written by Harriet Lee and Sophia Lee and published in five volumes from 1797 to 1805. Sophia's contributions consisted of two tales and the narrative introduction to the first volume; the rest of the work is Harriet's, and formed the basis of Harriet Lee's legacy as an author.

== Contents ==
- Canterbury Tales for the Year 1797 (1797). By Harriet Lee.
  - "Introduction" (by Sophia Lee)
  - "The Traveller's Tale: Montford"
  - "The Poet's Tale: Arundel"
  - "The Frenchman's Tale: Constance"
  - "The Old Woman's Tale: Lothaire"
- Canterbury Tales. Volume the Second (1798). By Sophia Lee.
  - "The Young Lady's Tale: The Two Emilys"
- Canterbury Tales. Volume the Third (1799). By Sophia and Harriet Lee.
  - "The Officer's Tale: William Cavendish" (by Harriet Lee)
  - "The Clergyman's Tale: Pembroke" (by Sophia Lee)
- Canterbury Tales. Volume the Fourth (1801). By Harriet Lee
  - "The German's Tale: Kruitzner"
  - "The Scotsman's Tale: Claudine"
- Canterbury Tales. Volume the Fifth (1805). By Harriet Lee
  - "The Landlady's Tale," preceded by a frame narrative named "Canterbury Tales"
  - "The Friend's Tale: Stanhope"
  - "The Wife's Tale: Julia"
