= Almeyda, Queen of Granada =

Play by Sophia Lee

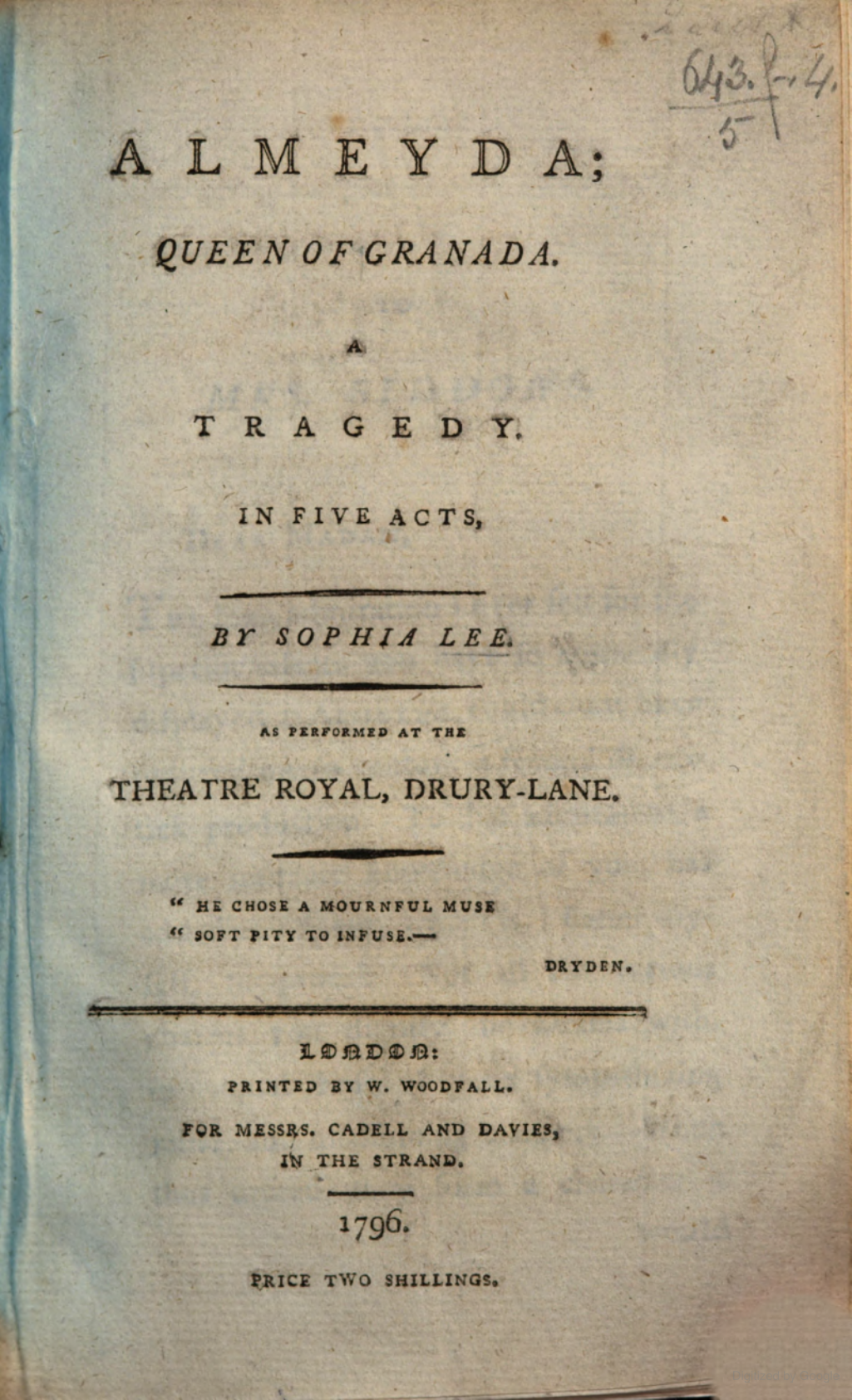
- Written by: Sophia Lee
- Original language: English
- Genre: Tragedy

Premiere
- Date premiered: 20 April 1796
- Place premiered: Theatre Royal, Drury Lane

Almeyda, Queen of Granada is a 1796 tragedy play by the British writer Sophia Lee.

The original Drury Lane cast included John Palmer as Abdallah, James Aickin as Ramirez, Richard Wroughton as Orasmyn, John Philip Kemble as Alonzo, Thomas Caulfield as Nourassin, Charles Kemble as Hamet, Sarah Siddons as Almeyda and Jane Powell as Victoria.

== Bibliography ==
- Nicoll, Allardyce. A History of English Drama 1660-1900: Volume III. Cambridge University Press, 2009.
- Hogan, C.B (ed.) The London Stage, 1660-1800: Volume V. Southern Illinois University Press, 1968.
