= Sophia Lee =

English novelist, dramatist and educator (1750–1824)

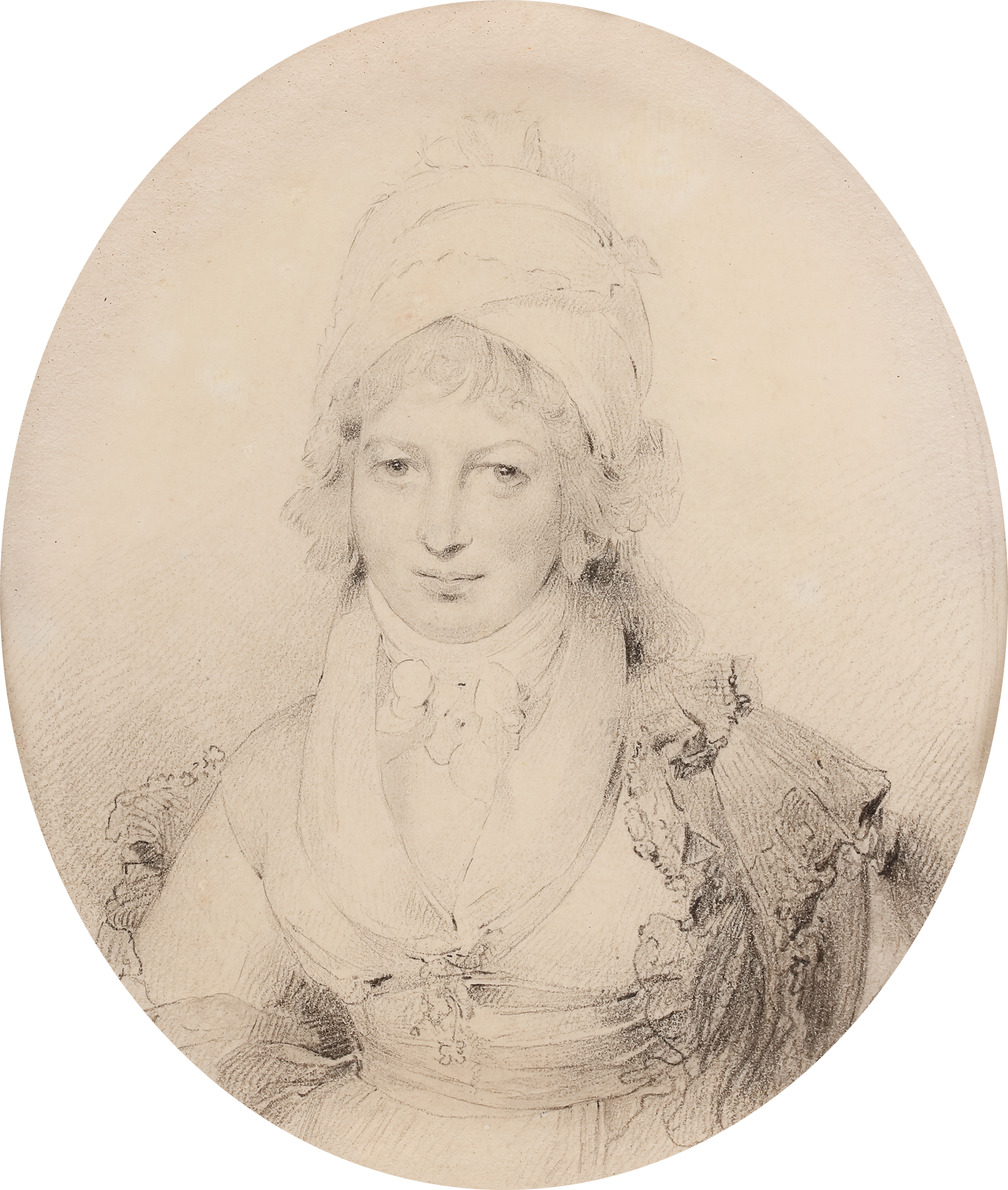
- Sophia Lee, portrait in pencil by Thomas Lawrence, mid-1790s
- Born: 1750; London
- Died: 13 March 1824; Clifton, Bristol
- Occupations: playwright, librettist

Sophia Lee (1750 – 13 March 1824) was an English novelist, dramatist and educator. She was a formative writer of Gothic fiction.

== Life and literary production ==
She was the daughter and oldest surviving child of John Lee (died 1781), actor and theatrical manager, and was born in London. Her father was jailed twice for bankruptcy before she was 25. Her first piece, The Chapter of Accidents, a three-act drama based on Denis Diderot's Le père de famille, was produced by George Colman the Elder at the Haymarket Theatre on 5 August 1780 (having been written eight years previously) and was an immediate success. This play contained the first use of the word dang.

When her father died in 1781, Lee spent the proceeds of the play on establishing a school at Bath, where she made a home for her sisters Anne and Harriet. Her novel The Recess, or a Tale of other Times (1783–1785) was a historical romance. The Recess, set in Elizabethan times, revolves around two fictional daughters of Mary, Queen of Scots. Lee also wrote the play Almeyda, Queen of Granada (1796), a long tragedy in blank verse, which opened at Drury Lane on 20 April 1796 with Lee's friend Sarah Siddons in the lead role, but ran for only five nights.

The Recess can also be regarded as a formative work of the original Gothic, echoing and pre-dating themes from other contemporary Gothic writers. It was so popular that a spin-off novelette appeared in 1820, Rose Douglas; or, The Court of Elizabeth William Hazlitt might consider it "dismal" by comparison with the works of Ann Radcliffe, but its influence both on the Gothic school of the Minerva Press, and on figures like Walter Scott is nonetheless clear. From this work, Italian writer Carlo Federici wrote the play Il paggio di Leicester (Leicester's Page) and, in turn, that became the source of Elisabetta, regina d'Inghilterra, (Elizabeth, Queen of England) the 1812 opera by Gioachino Rossini, the libretto of which was written by Giovanni Schmidt.

Sophia also contributed two tales to the collection of Canterbury Tales written by her sister Harriet Lee, between 1797 and 1805. Other works included The Life of a Lover (1804) and Ormond; or the Debauchee (1810). She died at her house near Clifton, Bristol on 13 March 1824.

In 1803, Sophia Lee gave up the management of the girls' school in Bath. She spent her remaining years in seclusion and settled in Clifton near Bristol in 1812, where she died on March 13, 1824 at the age of 73.

Charlotte von Stein used the novel The Two Emilys as a model for her drama Die Zwey Emilien.

== Works ==
Plays:

- The Chapter of Accidents (1780)
- Almeyda, Queen of Granada (1796)
- The Assignation (1807)

Novels:

- The Recess (1783–1785); part2, part 3
- The Two Emilys (1798), for Canterbury Tales.
- The Life of a Lover (1804)
- Ormond; or the Debauchee (1810)

== Notes ==
Attribution

- This article incorporates text from a publication now in the public domain: Lee, Elizabeth (1892). "Lee, Sophia". In Lee, Sidney (ed.). Dictionary of National Biography. Vol. 32. London: Smith, Elder & Co.

== Bibliography ==
- Alliston, April. Virtue's Faults: Correspondences in Eighteenth-Century British and French Women's Fiction (Stanford: Stanford University Press, 1996).
- Alliston, April, ed. The Recess, or, A Tale of Other Times (Lexington: University Press of Kentucky, 2000).
- Lewis, Jayne Elizabeth. "'Ev'ry Lost Relation': Historical Fictions and Sentimental Incidents in Sophia Lee's The Recess." Eighteenth-Century Fiction 7, no. 2 (January 1995): 165–84.
- Lewis, Jayne Elizabeth. Mary Queen of Scots: Romance and Nation (London: Routledge, 1998).
- Nordius, Janina. "A Tale of Other Places: Sophia Lee's The Recess and Colonial Gothic." Studies in the Novel 34.2 (Summer 2002): 162–76.
- Rigliano, Matthew J. "The Recess Does Not Exist: Absorption, Literality, and Feminine Subjectivity in Sophia Lee's The Recess." Eighteenth-Century Fiction 26.2 (Winter 2013–14): 209–32.
- Sodeman, Melissa. Sentimental Memorials: Women and the Novel in Literary History (Stanford: Stanford University Press, 2014).
- Stevens, Anne H. British Historical Fiction Before Scott (New York: Palgrave, 2010).
