= Manchester Oratory =

- St Chad's Church, Cheetham Hill
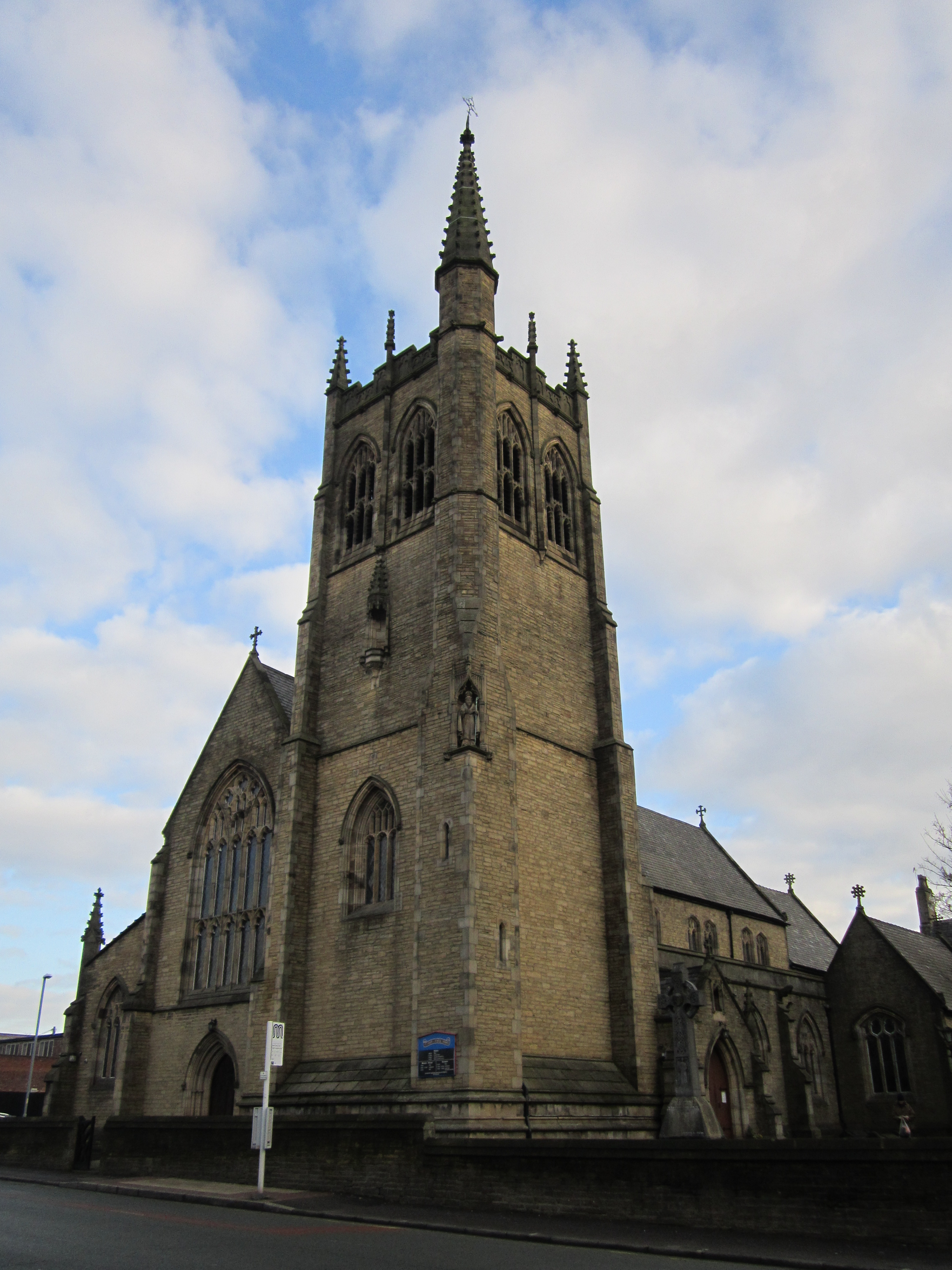
- St Chad's in 2014

- Location within Greater Manchester
- 53.4923°N 2.2399°W
- OS grid reference: SJ 84184 99533
- Location: Cheetham, Manchester
- Country: England
- Denomination: Roman Catholic
- Tradition: Oratory of Saint Philip Neri
- Website: https://www.manchesteroratory.org

History
- Dedication: St Chad
- Consecrated: 4 August 1847

Architecture
- Heritage designation: Grade II*
- Style: Gothic Revival

Administration
- Diocese: Diocese of Salford

The Oratory Church of Saint Chad's, Manchester (Manchester Oratory for short) is a Grade II listed Catholic church in Cheetham Hill, Manchester, England. It was constructed between 1846 and 1847, on the east side of Cheetham Hill Road. The parish functions under the jurisdiction of the Roman Catholic Diocese of Salford.

== Origins ==
St Chad's is the Catholic mother-church of Manchester, tracing its origins back to the 1770s. With the legacy of £200 from the will of the Revd Edward Helme (the first resident Catholic priest since the Reformation) a chapel dedicated to St Chad was built on Rook Street off Market Street in 1776 (now lost under new buildings). The Revd Roland Broomhead became the first Rector 1776–1820, and built new chapels of St Mary Mulberry Street and St Augustine, Granby Row. He died shortly after the opening of the latter, after which St Chad's became chapel-of-ease to the new church. However, due to a growing need, it became an independent mission again in 1835 when Fr William Turner, who would later become the first Bishop of Salford, was appointed to take charge. He was succeeded in 1842 by Fr Robert Croskell, later to be the second Provost and Vicar General of the Diocese. The Rook Street chapel was sold in 1846 to be converted into a warehouse.

For a short time there was a chapel-of-ease served from St Chad's; St William's on Simpson Street in Angel Meadow (1865–1905).

== Construction ==
The new church was designed by Weightman and Hadfield in the Gothic Revival style for Fr Robert Croskell. Building work commenced in April 1846 and the new church was opened 4 August 1847 by Bishop George Hilary Brown.

== Clergy ==
1778-1820 – Rev Rowland Broomhead

1820-1838 – Served from St Augustine’s, Granby Row

1838-1853 – Provost Robert Croskell VG

1853-1891 – Canon William Sheehan VG

1891-1900 – Mgr Charles Gadd VG

1900-1905 – Dean John Hennesey

1905-1908 – Fr John Crombleholme

1909-1925 – Fr Denis Sheahan

1926-1940 – Canon Joseph Callaway

1940-1944 – Fr Joseph McEnery

1944-1949 – Fr James Kelly

1949-1964 – Fr Herbert J Power

1965-1974 – Fr Vincent Sweeney

1974-2003 – Fr Bernard McGarry

The church was served by clergy of the Salford Diocese until 2003 when the last secular Parish Priest retired. The church was then served for a period from St Anne, Crumpsall. In 2007, the Premonstratensians took up residence following the closure of Corpus Christi Priory, Miles Platting, however they only stayed for a short period. St Chad's then served as the residence for the Strangeways Prison chaplain. In 2013, the Oratorian community from the Church of the Holy Name of Jesus, Manchester took over St Chad's with permission to establish the Manchester Oratory of St Philip Neri there. The Manchester Oratory was founded at St Chad's on 1 November 2019.
