= Holt baronets =

Extinct baronetcy in the Baronetage of the United Kingdom

There have been two Holt baronetcies created in the Baronetage of the United Kingdom.

The Holt baronetcy of Cheetham, Lancashire, was created on 8 July 1916 for Edward Holt, former Lord Mayor of Manchester. He was succeeded in 1928 by his son, also Edward, on whose death the baronetcy became extinct.

The Holt baronetcy of Liverpool was created on 30 January 1935 for Richard Durning Holt, MP and became extinct on his death.

== Holt baronets of Cheetham, Lancashire (1916) ==
- Sir Edward Holt, 1st Baronet (1849–1928)
- Sir Edward Holt, 2nd Baronet (1883–1968)

== Holt baronet of Liverpool, Lancashire (1935) ==
- Sir Richard Durning Holt, 1st Baronet (1868–1941)

== See also ==
- Holte baronets
- Holt (surname)
