= Harriet Lee (writer) =

English novelist and playwright (1757–1851)

Harriet Lee was an English writer and novelist, born in London in 1757, and died near Bristol at Clifton, England, on August 1, 1851. Her father, John Lee, was an actor and theatrical manager who died in 1781, her mother, name unknown, was also an actress. Additionally, she was the sister of Sophia Lee (1750–1824), a notable dramatist.

== Life ==
Lee was born in London in 1757. After the death of her father, John Lee, in 1781, she helped her sister, Sophia Lee, manage a private school in Belvedere House, Bath.

In 1786, she published The Errors of Innocence, a novel broken up into five volumes, written in epistolary form. She also wrote a comedy, called The New Peerage, which was performed at Drury Lane on November 10, 1787. It had a prologue written by Richard Cumberland. Although it was performed nine times, it was not successful enough to encourage her to continue writing for the stage. John Genest described it as 'on the whole, a poor play'. It was published with a dedication to Thomas King, the actor who had taken the chief role.

Clara Lennox, a two-volume-novel, was published in 1797 and translated into French the following year. The five volumes of Lee's most famous work, Canterbury Tales, were published between 1797 and 1805. In 1798, she published a play, called The Mysterious Marriage, in three acts, It was also called The Heirship of Rosalva. It has never been staged.

Before 1798, William Godwin met Lee during a ten-day visit in Bath. He was impressed with her conversation and, in a letter he sent to Lee after their meeting, stated "There are so few persons in the world that have excited that degree of interest in my mind which you have excited". He had been determined to offer her a marriage proposal. Lee found the self-absorption in Godwin's letter distasteful, and she chastised him with a frank response. From April to August 1798, they carried out a correspondence. Godwin again visited Bath at the end of 1798 and met with Lee. She ultimately decided that his religious opinions made a happy union impossible. She thought this because Godwin is considered one of the first exponents of utilitarianism and the first modern proponent of anarchism. Her last letter, sent on 7 August 1798, expressed a hope that friendly relations might be maintained; and Godwin sent letters to her at a later date criticizing some of her literary productions.

Among her friends were the novelists Jane and Anna Maria Porter, who lived in Bristol, and Thomas Lawrence. Allegedly, Sophia and Harriet Lee were the first to predict the future eminence of Sir Thomas Lawrence, who presented to them portraits by himself of Mrs. Siddons, John Kemble, and General Paoli. Samuel Rogers mentions meeting Harriet Lee in 1792. She lived to ninety-four, remaining lively, clear-minded, and kind until her death. She died in Clifton, Bristol, on 1 August 1851.

== Influence on Byron ==
Canterbury Tales (1797–1805), Lee's best-known work, consists of twelve stories, with a common theme of travellers thrown together by untoward accident - modelled on Geoffrey Chaucer's well-known work of the same name. The book fell into the hands of Lord Byron when he was a boy. He wrote in the preface to Werner, regarding one of the tales, Kruitzner, 'When I was young (about fourteen, I think), I first read this tale, which made a deep impression upon me, and may, indeed, be said to contain the germ of much that I have since written.' In 1821 Byron dramatized 'Kruitzner,' and published it in 1822 under the title of 'Werner, or the Inheritance.' In the preface he fully acknowledged his indebtedness to Harriet Lee's story, stating that he adopted its characters, place, and even its language. Lee had already dramatized her story at an earlier date, under the title of The Three Strangers and on the publication of Byron's dramatic version she sent her play to the Covent Garden Theatre (November 1822); but although the piece was accepted, the performance was postponed by her own wish till 10 Dec. 1825, when it was acted four times. The cast included James Prescott Warde, Charles Kemble, and Mrs. Chatterley. John Genest describes it as 'far from bad.' It was published in 1826.

== Sources ==
- British Authors Before 1800: A Biographical Dictionary, edited by Stanley J. Kunitz and Howard Haycraft, New York, The H. W. Wilson Company, 1952.
- April Alliston, 'Lee, Harriet (1757/8–1851)', Oxford Dictionary of National Biography, Oxford University Press, 2004, accessed 13 November 2006
- Rebecca Garwood, 'Sophia Lee (1750–1824) and Harriet Lee (1757–1851)' at www.chawton org
- Ripley, George; Dana, Charles A., eds. (1879). "Lee, Sophia" . The American Cyclopædia.
- Harriet Lee, from Wikinfo
- Chisholm, Hugh, ed. (1911). "Lee, Sophia" . Encyclopædia Britannica (11th ed.). Cambridge University Press. This article on her sister also has a paragraph on Harriet Lee.
