= St Luke's Church, Cheetham =

Former Anglican parish church in Manchester, England

St Luke's Church
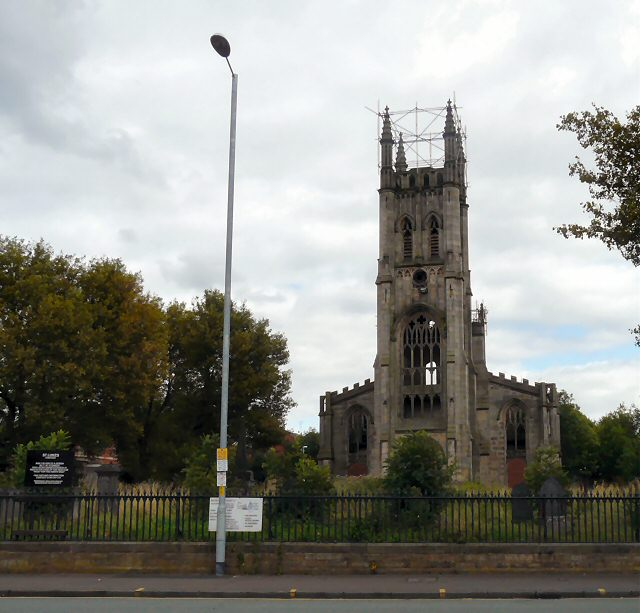
- St Luke's, Cheetham Hill
- St Luke's Church
- 53°30′13″N 2°14′4″W
- OS grid reference: SD 84541 00823
- Address: Cheetham Hill Road, Manchester, M8 8JA
- Country: England
- Denomination: Anglican

History
- Status: Derelict

Architecture
- Architect: T. W. Atkinson
- Style: Perpendicular Gothic
- Years built: 1836–1839

Specifications
- Materials: Ashlar

Listed Building – Grade II
- Official name: Ruins of Church of St Luke
- Designated: 3 October 1974
- Reference no.: 1293101

St Luke's Church was an Anglican parish church in the Cheetham district of Manchester, England. The structure is now mostly derelict and is currently owned by the Heritage Trust for the North West.

The Church of St Luke was a Commissioners' church, situated on the corner of Cheetham Hill Road and Smedley Lane. The building was completed in 1839, using ashlar, to a Perpendicular Gothic design by T. W. Atkinson. Construction had commenced in 1836.

A wealthy local resident and enthusiastic amateur musician, J. W. Fraser, commissioned William Hill to design and install a three-manual church organ in the German System style. This was completed in 1840. Mendelssohn gave a recital using this instrument in April 1847.

Although now mostly derelict, the tower and west end of the aisles and vestry survive and are classified as a Grade II listed building.

In the grounds of the ruined church also lies a large crypt supported by pillars and archways, that still contains remnants of pottery and headstones. Eerie photos of the crypt have appeared online, attracting attention to this historic site.

The church was considered the best early Gothic Revival church in Manchester. The large churchyard was once a fashionable burial site. The church was a stronghold of Protestantism and became notorious when the rector, Hugh Stowell, was accused of libel in 1840.

== See also ==
- Listed buildings in Manchester-M8
- List of churches in Greater Manchester
- List of Commissioners' churches in Northeast and Northwest England
