= Piccadilly Mill =

18th-century English steam-powered cotton mill

Coordinates: 53.4787°N 2.2333°W

Piccadilly Mill, also known as Bank Top Mill or Drinkwater's Mill, owned by Peter Drinkwater, was the first cotton mill in Manchester, England, to be directly powered by a steam engine, and the 10th such mill in the world. Construction of the four-storey mill on Auburn Street started in 1789 and its 8 hp Boulton and Watt engine was installed and working by 1 May 1790. Initially the engine drove only the preparatory equipment and spinning was done manually. The millwright was Thomas Lowe, who had worked for William Fairbairn and helped with the planning of two of Richard Arkwright's earliest factories.

During the early 1790s the mill employed around 500 workers. Robert Owen was employed as the manager in 1792.

== Bibliography ==
- Kidd, Alan J. (2013), "Drinkwater, Peter (1750–1801), cotton manufacturer", Oxford Dictionary of National Biography, Oxford University Press
- Miller, Ian; Wild, Chris (2007), A & G Murray and the Cotton Mills of Ancoats, Lancaster Imprints, ISBN 978-0-904220-46-9
- Nevell, Michael (2007), "The Social Archaeology of Industrialisation: the example of Manchester during the 17th and 18th centuries", in Casella, Eleanor Conlin; Symonds, James (eds.), Industrial Archaeology: Future Directions, Springer, pp. 177–204, ISBN 978-0-387-22831-0
