= Peter Drinkwater =

British businessman (1750–1801)

Peter Drinkwater (1750 – 15 November 1801) was an English cotton manufacturer and merchant.

Born in Whalley, Lancashire, he had a successful career as a fustian manufacturer using the domestic putting-out system, and as a merchant based in Bolton and Manchester, before he turned to large-scale factory production in the 1780s.

In 1782 he opened his first cotton mill on the River Weaver in Northwich, Cheshire and in 1789 he started construction of the Piccadilly Mill in Manchester. This was the first mill in Manchester to be directly driven by a steam engine.

== Bibliography ==
- Kidd, Alan J. (2013), "Drinkwater, Peter (1750–1801), cotton manufacturer", Oxford Dictionary of National Biography, Oxford University Press
- Nevell, Michael (2007), "The Social Archaeology of Industrialisation: the example of Manchester during the 17th and 18th centuries", in Casella, Eleanor Conlin; Symonds, James (eds.), Industrial Archaeology: Future Directions, Springer, pp. 177–204, ISBN 978-0-387-22831-0
