= Manchester Jewish Museum =

Jewish museum in Manchester, England

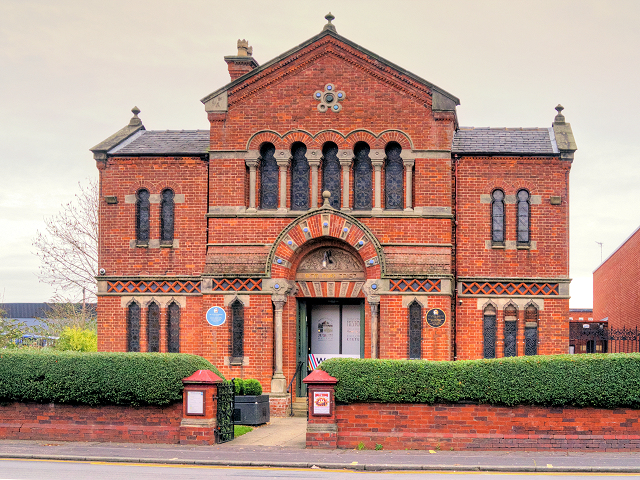
- The Manchester Jewish Museum, in 2015

- Location of the museum in Greater Manchester
- Former names: Sha'are Tephillah Synagogue; Spanish & Portuguese Synagogue
- Location: 190 Cheetham Hill Road, Manchester, England
- Coordinates: 53°29′45″N 2°14′18″W
- Type: Jewish history museum
- Website: manchesterjewishmuseum.com

Listed Building – Grade II*
- Official name: Manchester Jewish Museum
- Type: Listed building
- Designated: 3 October 1974
- Reference no.: 1208472

Spanish & Portuguese Synagogue
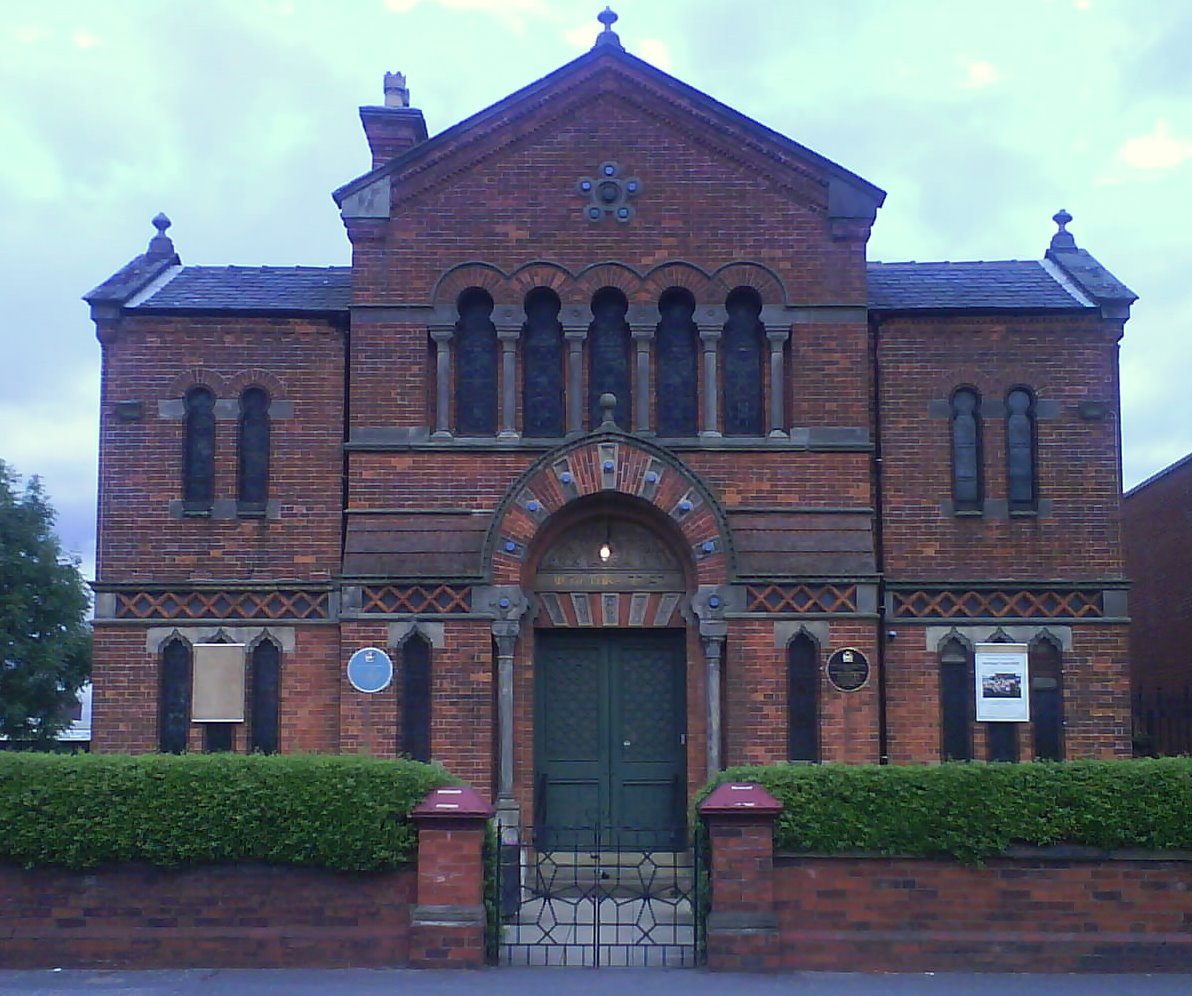
- The former synagogue, now museum, in 2008

Religion
- Affiliation: Orthodox Judaism (former)
- Rite: Nusach Sefard
- Ecclesiastical or organizational status: Synagogue (1874–1984)
- Status: Closed (as a synagogue); Repurposed (as a museum)

Location
- Location: 190 Cheetham Hill Road, Manchester
- Interactive map of Spanish & Portuguese Synagogue

Architecture
- Architect: Edward Salomons
- Type: Synagogue architecture
- Style: Moorish Revival
- Completed: 1874

The Manchester Jewish Museum is a Jewish history museum, located on Cheetham Hill Road in Manchester, England. The museum occupies the site of a former Orthodox Jewish synagogue, the place of worship for the Congregation of Spanish & Portuguese Jews, called the Spanish & Portuguese Synagogue, also the Sha'are Tephillah Synagogue. The congregation worships in the Sephardic rite from premises located on Moor Lane in Kersal, Salford.

The building, used as a synagogue from 1874 until 1984, was listed as Grade II* in 1974.

== History ==
The former synagogue for Spanish and Portuguese Jews was completed in 1874. However, the building became redundant through the migration of the Jewish population away from the Cheetham area further north to Prestwich and Whitefield. It re-opened as a museum in March 1984 telling the story of the history of Jewish settlement in Manchester and its community over more than 200 years.

The museum reopened on 2 July 2021 following a ££6 million redevelopment and extension. The museum includes a new gallery, vegetarian café, shop and learning studio and kitchen, as well as complete restoration of the former Spanish and Portuguese synagogue.

Following completion of the renovation works, the Manchester Jewish Museum won two awards at the annual British Construction Industry Awards (Cultural and Leisure Project of the Year and Best Small Project of the Year) alongside architects Citizens Design Bureau and structural engineers Buro Happold.

The museum holds over 31,000 items in its collection, documenting the story of Jewish migration and settlement in Manchester. It includes over 530 oral history testimonies, over 20,000 photographs, 138 recorded interviews with Holocaust survivors and refugees and other objects, documents and ephemera.

== Moorish Revival building ==
The 1874 synagogue was completed in the Moorish Revival style, designed by Edward Salomons, a prominent Manchester architect. Although the synagogue was not the largest or most magnificent of the world's many Moorish Revival synagogues, which include the opulent Princes Road Synagogue in Liverpool, it was considered to be a "jewel". The style, a homage to the architecture of Moorish Spain, perhaps seemed particularly fitting for the home of a Sephardic congregation. The two tiers of horseshoe windows on the façade were emblematic of the style, and the recessed doorway and arcade of five windows on the floor above the entrance are particularly decorative. Inside, a horseshoe arch frames the heichal and polychrome columns support the galleries. The mashrabiyya latticework on the front doors is particularly fine.

== See also ==
- History of the Jews in England
- List of former synagogues in the United Kingdom
- Listed buildings in Manchester-M8
- Grade II* listed buildings in Greater Manchester
