= Cheetham, Manchester =

Area of Manchester, England

Cheetham Hill: Cheetham
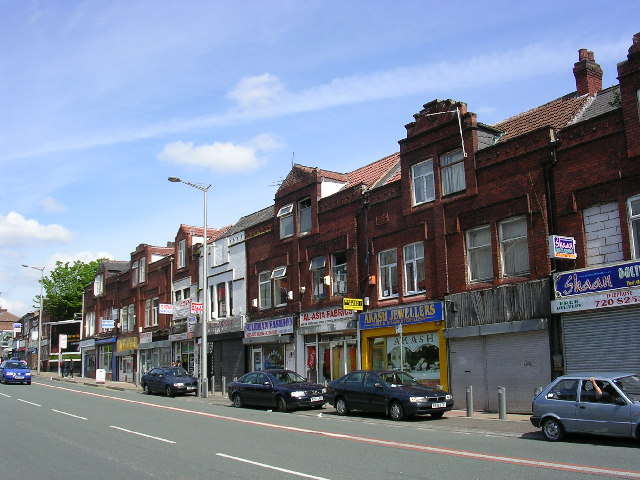
- Cheetham Hill Road

- Location within Greater Manchester
- Population: 22,562 (2011 Census)
- OS grid reference: SD846009
  - London: 164 mi (264 km) SE
- Metropolitan borough: Manchester
- Metropolitan county: Greater Manchester
- Region: North West
- Country: England
- Sovereign state: United Kingdom
- Post town: MANCHESTER
- Postcode district: M8
- Dialling code: 0161
- Police: Greater Manchester
- Fire: Greater Manchester
- Ambulance: North West
- UK Parliament: Manchester Central
- Councillors: Shazia Butt (Labour); Shaukat Ali (Labour); Naeem Hassam (Labour)

Cheetham is an inner-city area and electoral ward of Manchester, England, which in 2011 had a population of 22,562. It lies on the west bank of the River Irk, 1.4 miles (2.3 km) north of Manchester city centre, close to the boundary with Salford, bounded by Crumpsall to the north, Broughton to the west, Harpurhey to the east, and Piccadilly and Deansgate to the south.

Historically part of Lancashire, Cheetham was a township in the parish of Manchester and hundred of Salford. It was amalgamated into the Borough of Manchester in 1838, and in 1896 became part of the North Manchester.

Cheetham is home to a multi-ethnic community, a result of several waves of immigration to Britain. In the mid-19th century, it attracted Irish people fleeing the Great Famine. It is now home to the Irish World Heritage Centre. Jews settled in the late-19th and early-20th centuries, fleeing persecution in continental Europe. Migrants from Pakistan and the Caribbean settled in the 1950s and 1960s, and more recently people from Africa, Eastern Europe and the Far East.

Heavily urbanised following the Industrial Revolution, Cheetham is bisected by Cheetham Hill Road, which is lined with churches, mosques, synagogues and temples, as well as terraced houses dating from its history as a textile processing district. Markets along the road trade in wares and foodstuffs from all over the world. The Museum of Transport in Manchester in Boyle Street, Cheetham, is part of Queen's Road bus depot.

== Etymology ==
The name Cheetham is first attested in the late twelfth century, as Cheteham, followed by thirteenth-century attestations including Chetam and Chetham. The first element of the name comes from the Common Brittonic word that survives in modern Welsh as coed ("woodland"). The second element is the Old English word hām ("settlement"). Thus there was once a place named, in Brittonic, for a nearby wood; Old English-speakers then coined a further name meaning "settlement at [the place called] Cheet".

In the district also lies Cheetwood, whose name is first attested in 1489, as Chetewode. This means "wood [at the place called] Cheet"; the wood in question was presumably the same one that originally gave the Brittonic name Cheet in the first place.

== History ==
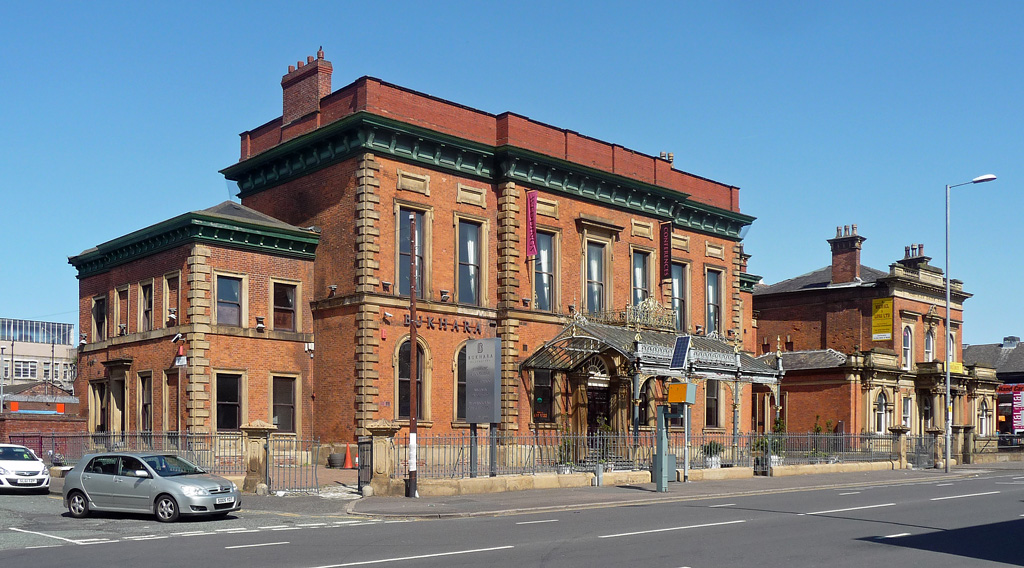
Cheetham Town Hall (now used as a restaurant)

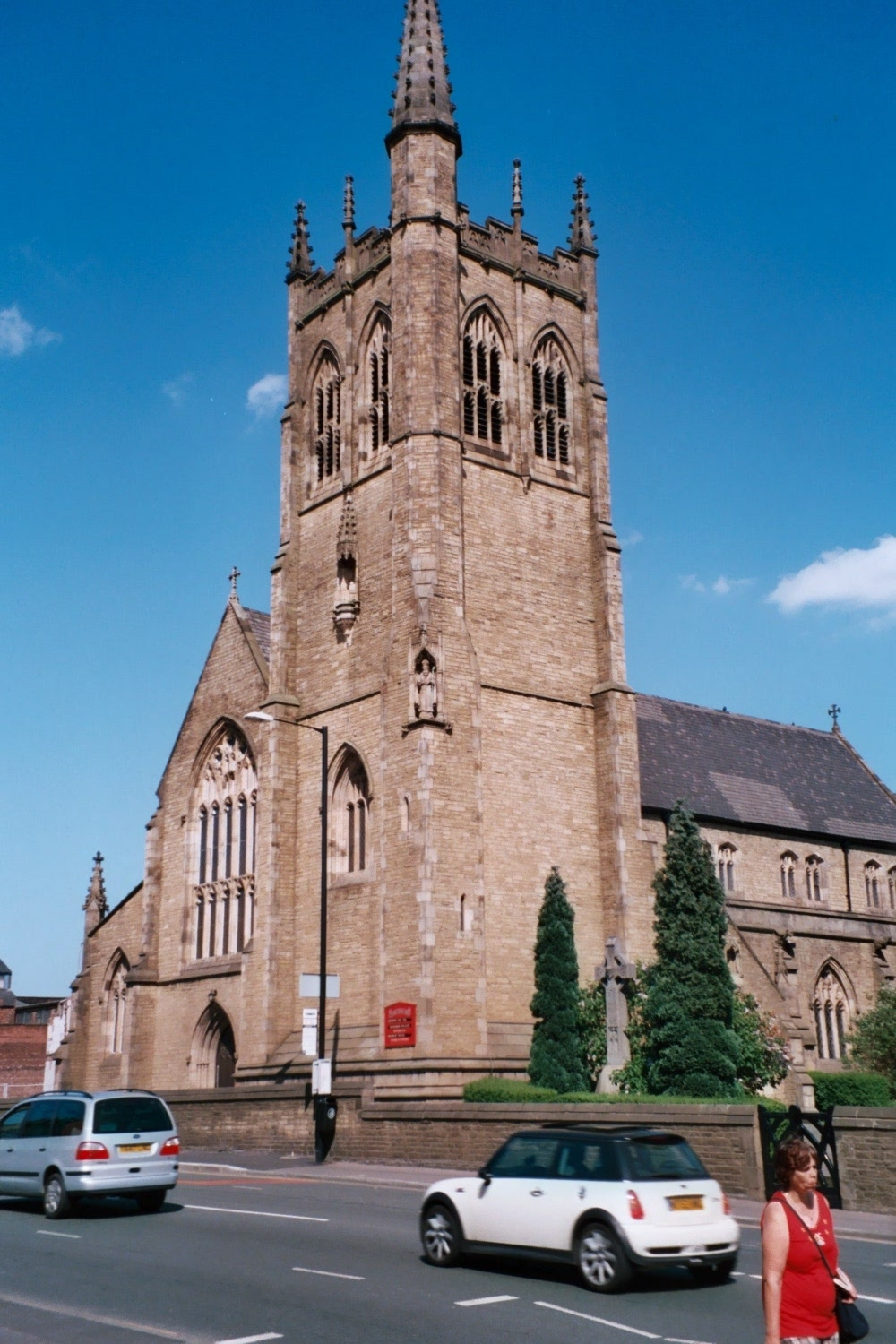
St Chad's Church (RC)

Neolithic implements have been discovered at Cheetham Hill, implying human habitation 7–10,000 years ago.

Cheetham is not mentioned in the Domesday Book of 1086 and does not appear in records until 1212, when it was documented to have been a thegnage estate comprising "a plough-land", with an annual rate of 1 mark payable by the tenant, Roger de Middleton, to King John of England. From the Middletons the estate of Cheetham passed to other families, including the Chethams and Pilkingtons.

The Roman Catholic church of St Chad was opened in 1847. The Anglican churches as of 1955 were St Mark's (1794), St Luke's (1839), St John Evangelist's (Paley & Austin, 1871), St Alban's (J. S. Crowther); at that time there was also a Presbyterian chapel and nine synagogues. St Mark's Church was built in 1794; in 1855 the chancel was enlarged and in 1894 a tower was added. St Luke's Church is in a Victorian variant of the Perpendicular style. St John Evangelist's was designed by Paley & Austin and built at the expense of Lewis Loyd. St Alban's (1857–64) was designed by J. S. Crowther in a Gothic revival style influenced by French Gothic and is a good example of his work.

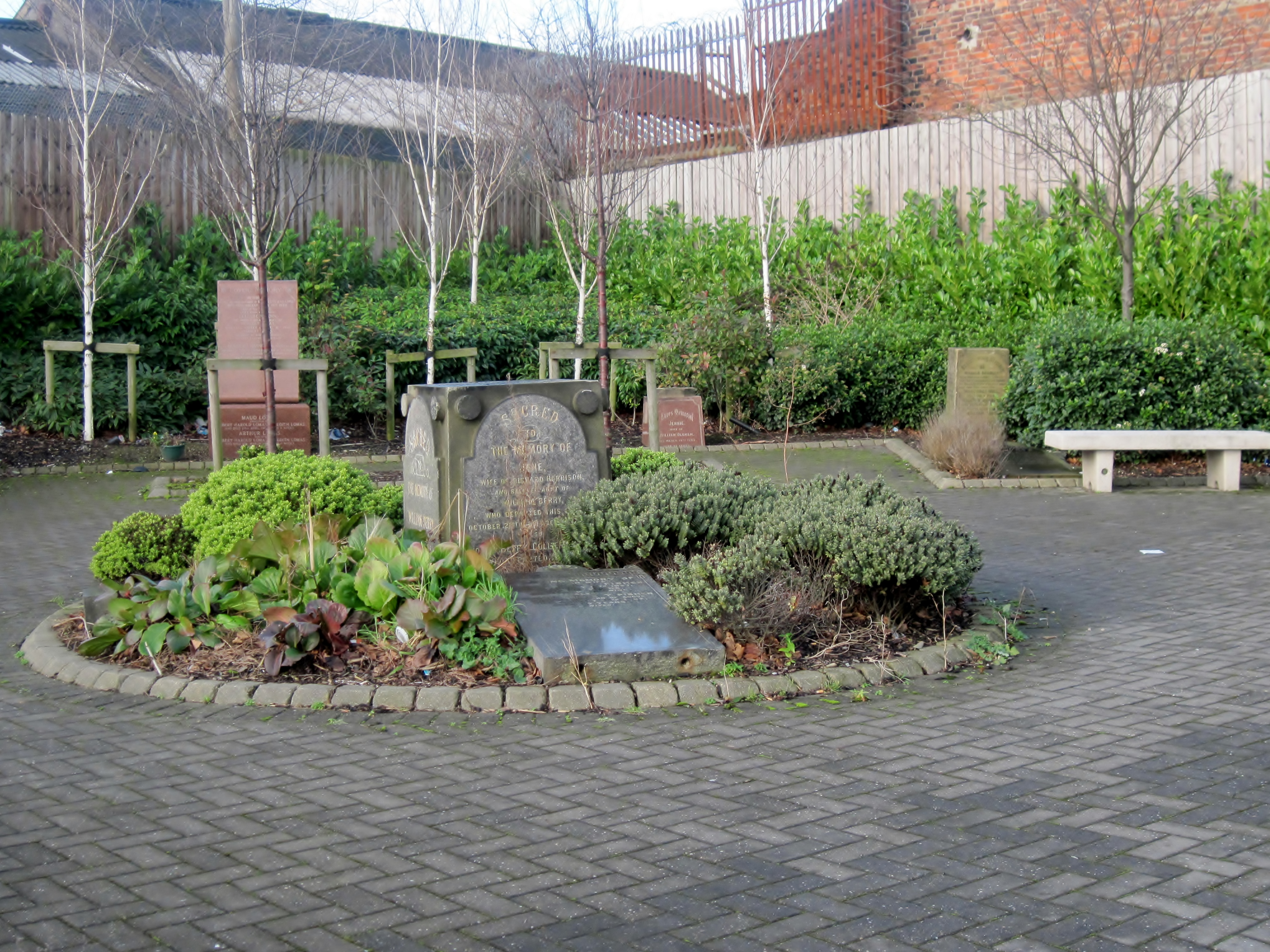
The Memorial Garden at Cheetham Hill Tesco commemorates the former Wesleyan Cemetery

A cemetery for the Wesleyan Methodist Church was established on Thomas Street in 1815. The Cheetham Hill Wesleyan Cemetery was closed to new burials in 1966 and fell into neglect. The land was sold to property developers in 2003 for the construction of a new Tesco superstore. Manchester City Council engaged contractors to exhume the remains of around 20,000 bodies to be re-interred in a mass grave in Bury. It was later reported that human remains were found at the Cheetham Hill building site and at a landfill site near Oldham. A memorial garden near the Tesco store has retained a small number of the Victorian gravestones.

The synagogues of Cheetham included the Central Synagogue (1927–28), a synagogue which was originally a Methodist chapel (in the neo-Classical style), the Great Synagogue (built of stone and brick in 1857), the New Synagogue (1889) and the United Synagogue which was originally a Roman Catholic chapel. The New Synagogue was known as the Spanish and Portuguese Jews' Synagogue and after a period of disuse was converted into the Manchester Jewish Museum. By the early 20th century, the southern end of Cheetham had a large Jewish population, and nine synagogues.

Joseph Holt's Brewery was established on Empire Street, Cheetham in 1860. Michael Marks was a Jewish immigrant who lived in Cheetham Hill with his family. He and Thomas Spencer opened the first Marks and Spencer store on Cheetham Hill Road in 1893. The business grew considerably over following years and in 1901 the company's first headquarters was built on Derby Street.

During the Madchester phase of the history of Manchester, narcotic trade in the city became "extremely lucrative" and in the early 1980s a gang war started between two groups vying for control of the market in Manchester city centre – the Cheetham Hill Gang and The Gooch Close Gang, in Cheetham Hill and Moss Side respectively.

== Governance ==
Lying within the historic county boundaries of Lancashire since the early 12th century, Cheetham anciently constituted a thegnage estate, held by tenants who paid tax to the King. Cheetham during the Middle Ages formed a township in the parish of Manchester, and hundred of Salford. Governance continued on this basis until the Industrial Revolution, when Cheetham and the neighbouring Manchester Township had become sufficiently urbanised and integrated to warrant an amalgamation into a single district: the then Borough of Manchester, in 1838. In 1866, Cheetham became a separate civil parish. There was a Cheetham Committee of Manchester Borough Council until 1875. On 26 March 1896, the parish was abolished and merged with Beswick, Blackley, Bradford, Clayton, Crumpsall, Harpurhey, Moston and Newton to form North Manchester. North Manchester was a part of the County Borough of Manchester. Cheetham Town Hall was completed in 1855. In 1891, the parish had a population of 29,590.

Following the Poor Law Amendment Act 1834, Cheetham formed part of the Manchester Poor Law Union from 1841 to 1850, Prestwich Poor Law Union from 1850 to 1915, and returned to Manchester Poor Law Union in 1915 until 1930. These were inter-parish units established to provide social security.

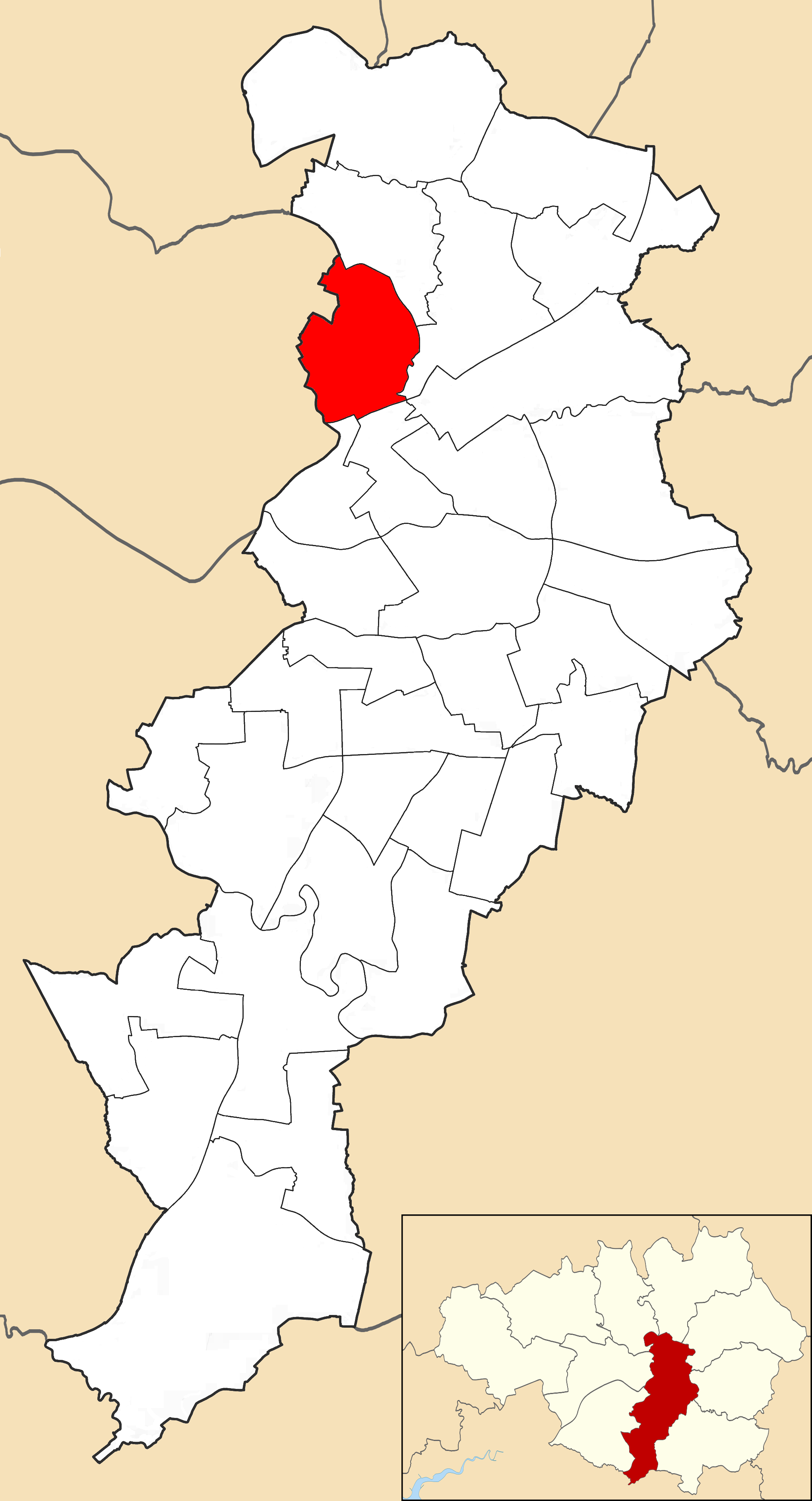
Cheetham electoral ward within Manchester City Council.

Cheetham is an electoral ward of Manchester City Council, and is part of the Manchester Central parliamentary constituency. The current MP is Lucy Powell of the Labour Party, representing Manchester Central since 2012. Winston Churchill was Liberal MP for the area early in his political career (some years before he re-crossed the floor to the Conservative Party).

=== Councillors ===
Three councillors serve the ward: Shazia Butt (Lab), Shaukat Ali (Lab), and Naeem Hassam (Lab).

Election	Councillor	Councillor	Councillor
2004	Naeem Hassam (Lab)	Afzal Khan (Lab)	Martin Pagel (Lab)
2006	Naeem Hassam (Lab)	Afzal Khan (Lab)	Martin Pagel (Lab)
2007	Naeem Hassam (Lab)	Afzal Khan (Lab)	Martin Pagel (Lab)
2008	Naeem Hassam (Lab)	Afzal Khan (Lab)	Martin Pagel (Lab)
2010	Naeem Hassam (Lab)	Afzal Khan (Lab)	Martin Pagel (Lab)
2011	Naeem Hassam (Lab)	Afzal Khan (Lab)	Martin Pagel (Lab)
2012	Naeem Hassam (Lab)	Afzal Khan (Lab)	Shaukat Ali (Lab)
2014	Naeem Hassam (Lab)	Afzal Khan (Lab)	Shaukat Ali (Lab)
2015	Naeem Hassam (Lab)	Julie Connolly (Lab)	Shaukat Ali (Lab)
2016	Naeem Hassam (Lab)	Julie Connolly (Lab)	Shaukat Ali (Lab)
2018	Naeem Hassam (Lab)	Julie Connolly (Lab)	Shaukat Ali (Lab)
2019	Naeem Hassam (Lab)	Shazia Butt (Lab)	Shaukat Ali (Lab)
2021	Naeem Hassam (Lab)	Shazia Butt (Lab)	Shaukat Ali (Lab)
2022	Naeem Hassam (Lab)	Shazia Butt (Lab)	Shaukat Ali (Lab)
2023	Naeem Hassam (Lab)	Shazia Butt (Lab)	Shaukat Ali (Lab)
2024	Naeem Hassam (Lab)	Shazia Butt (Lab)	Shaukat Ali (Lab)
2026	Naeem Hassam (Lab)	Shazia Butt (Lab)	Shaukat Ali (Lab)

indicates seat up for re-election.

== Geography ==
At 53°30′14″N 2°13′51″W (53.504°, -2.231°), Cheetham is 1.4 miles (2.3 km) northeast of Manchester city centre. To the north, it is bordered by Crumpsall, to the west by Broughton in Salford, to the east and the southeast by Harpurhey and Collyhurst, and by Manchester City Centre to the south.

Cheetham Hill lies on "rising ground" and is completely urbanised.

== Demography ==
Cheetham ward compared
2011 UK census	Cheetham	City of Manchester	England
Total population	22,562	503,127	53,012,456
White British	28.6%	59.3%	79.8%
White Irish	1.6%	2.5%	1.1%
White other	7.0%	4.9%	4.6%
Asian	38.8%	14.4%	7%
Black	10.6%	8.6%	3.4%
Chinese	3.0%	2.7%	0.7%
Mixed	4.8%	4.7%	2.2%
Arab or other	4.6%	3.1%	1%

The ward had a population of 22,562 at the 2011 census. Its population accounted for 4.2% of the city of Manchester's in 2010. In November 2011, 68.5% of residential properties were classified as private, while 31.5% were classified as social housing. House prices remain below the Manchester average.

== Notable people ==
- Don Arden — music promoter and manager of the Small Faces, ELO (born Harry Levy), father of Sharon Osbourne was born in Cheetham Hill
- Jon Ashworth, Labour Party politician, spent three childhood years in Cheetham Hill
- Frances Hodgson Burnett — author of The Secret Garden and A Little Princess was born in Cheetham
- Saira Choudhry (born 1982), actress, born in Cheetham Hill
- Sandra Douglas — athlete, a member of the Olympic 4 x 400 metre bronze medal-winning team in Barcelona 1992
- Efan Ekoku — former Premier League and Nigeria striker, was born in Cheetham Hill
- Jessie Fothergill (1851–1891), novelist, was born in Cheetham Hill
- Sir Edward Holt, 1st Baronet — brewer
- Abraham Hyman — survivor of the Titanic liner disaster, opened a delicatessen in Cheetham Hill, where it remains to this day
- Howard Jacobson — author, was born and raised in Cheetham Hill
- George Augustus Lee (1761–1826), industrialist, lived in Cheetham Hill
- Bugzy Malone — grime artist
- Lois Maynard — footballer for FC Halifax Town.
- Jack Rosenthal — playwright, known for The Evacuees, Bar Mitzvah Boy and early episodes of Coronation Street
- Benny Rothman — political activist, famous for taking part in the Mass trespass of Kinder Scout in Derbyshire
- F. L. Tavaré — landscape painter and antiquarian
- J. J. Thomson — English physicist who discovered the electron and won the Nobel Prize in Physics was born in Cheetham Hill

== See also ==
- Listed buildings in Manchester-M8
- Manchester Jewish Museum
