= Blackfriars, Greater Manchester =

Coordinates: 53.4867°N 2.2524°W

Blackfriars
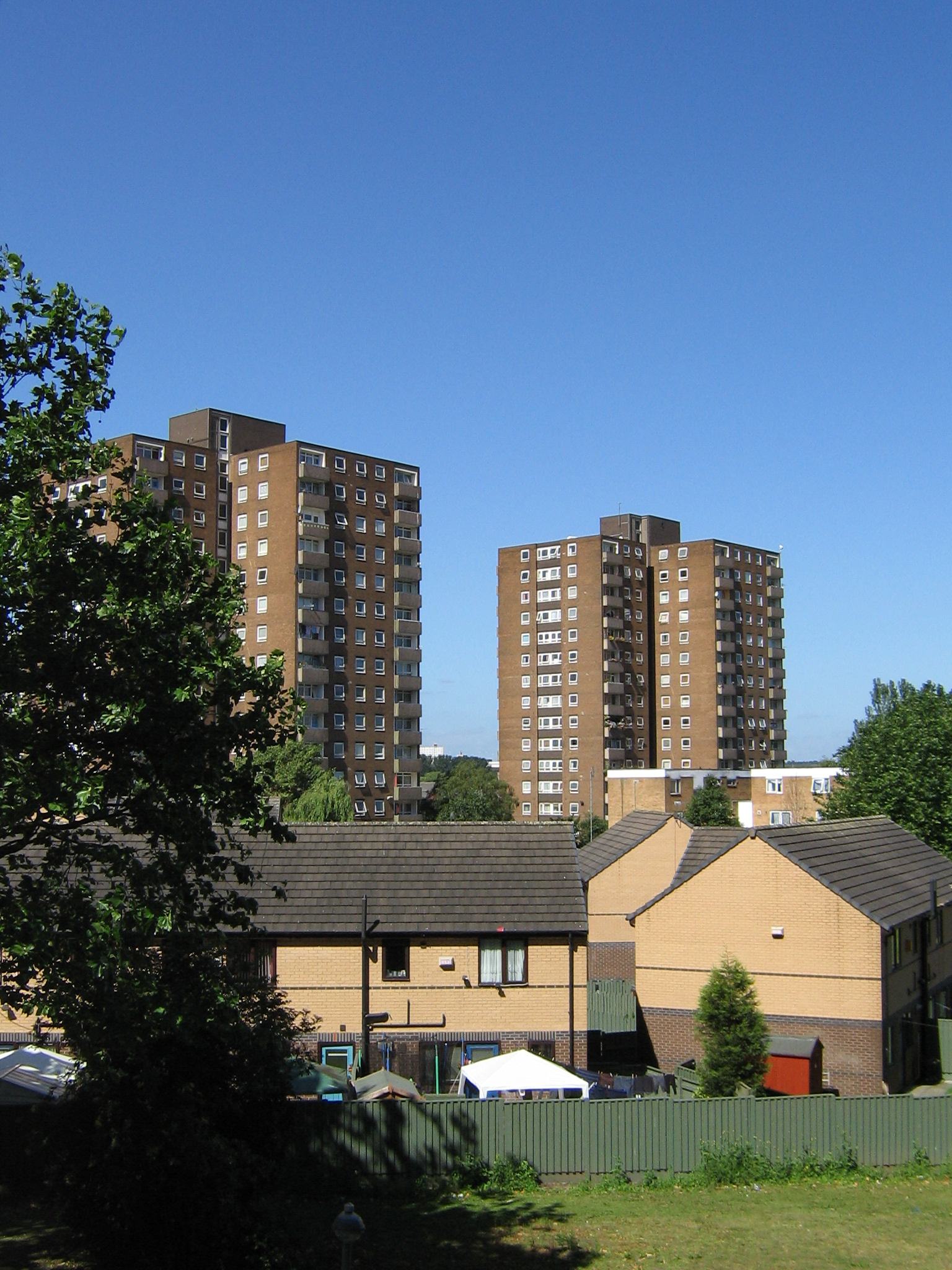
- Social housing in Blackfriars

- Location within Greater Manchester
- OS grid reference: SJ832989
- Metropolitan borough: Salford
- Metropolitan county: Greater Manchester
- Region: North West
- Country: England
- Sovereign state: United Kingdom
- Post town: SALFORD
- Postcode district: M3
- Dialling code: 0161
- Police: Greater Manchester
- Fire: Greater Manchester
- Ambulance: North West
- UK Parliament: Salford

Blackfriars is an outer-city suburb of Salford in Greater Manchester, England. It is situated along the banks of the River Irwell, close to the traditional centre of Salford at Greengate, between Manchester City Centre and Broughton. Blackfriars contains Blackfriars Park, one of Salford's smaller parks, and is home to the Friars Primary School.

Due to slum clearance very few buildings in Blackfriars now predate the 1960s. One notable exception is the 1874-built tavern on Blackfriars Road, which has been converted into 9 apartments for shared ownership.

== See also ==
- Dial House, Salford (serves the Blackfriars and Deansgate telephone exchanges}
