= Anchor telephone exchange =

Telephone exchange in Birmingham, England

Coordinates: 52.4829°N 1.9042°W

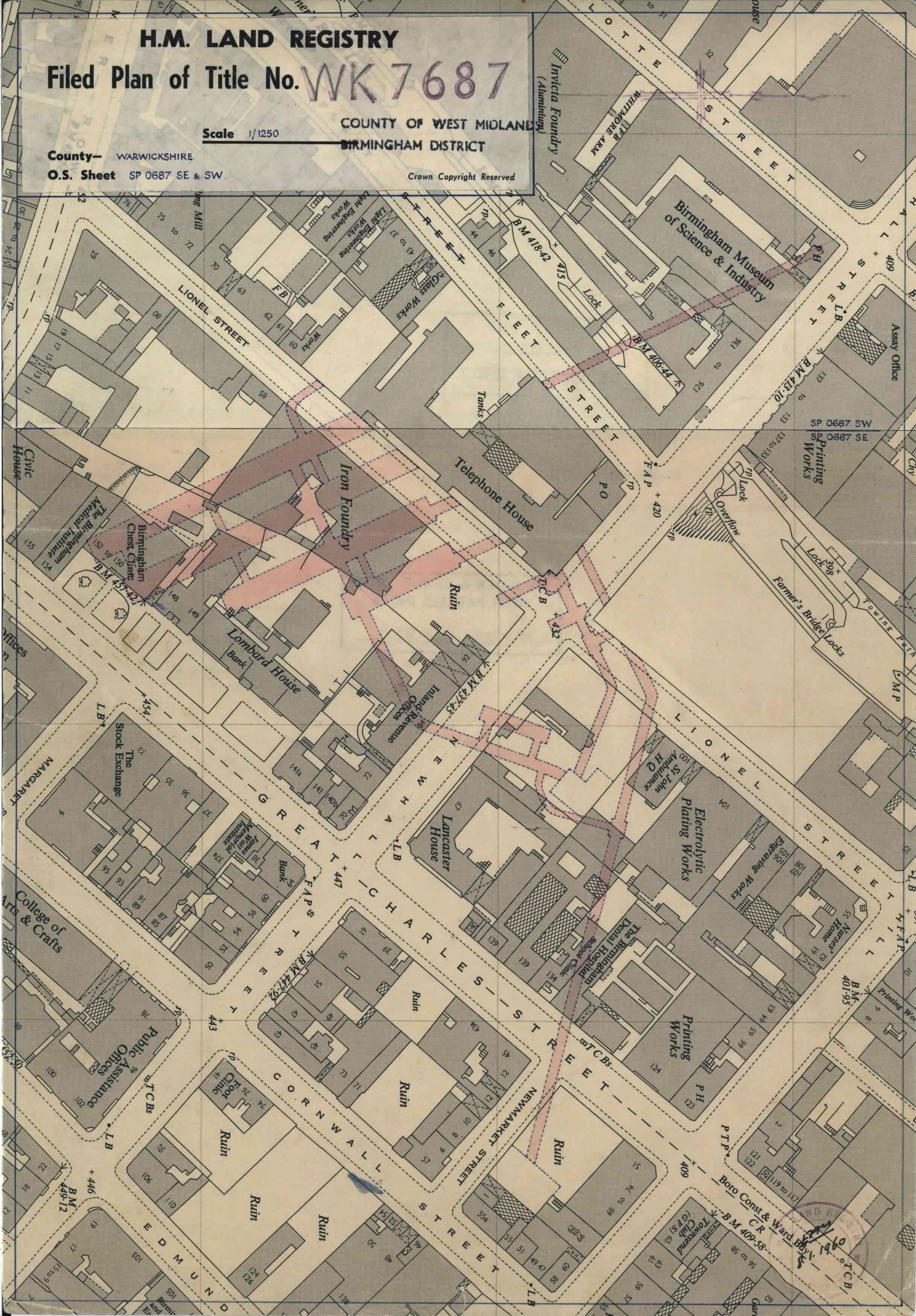
Land registry map, showing the exchange in pink (1959)

Anchor Exchange is an underground telephone switching system and former hardened telephone exchange built in Birmingham, England.

== History ==
Construction commenced in 1953 under the guise of building an underground railway. It opened in September 1957 at a cost of £4 million. It was located nominally on Newhall Street. However its network of tunnels extended from at least the Jewellery Quarter to Southside.

It originally formed one of a network of 18 zone switching centres within the UK telephone system that provided trunk switching facilities within its own charge group and to group switching centres (GSC) within an area broadly comprising the West Midlands and central Wales. The exchange formed part of the trunk mechanisation plan commenced in 1939 to permit operators from originating GSCs to dial through to a distant UK subscriber without requiring further operator intervention. Later, it was additionally used to switch subscriber-dialled trunk calls after its introduction at Bristol in 1958.

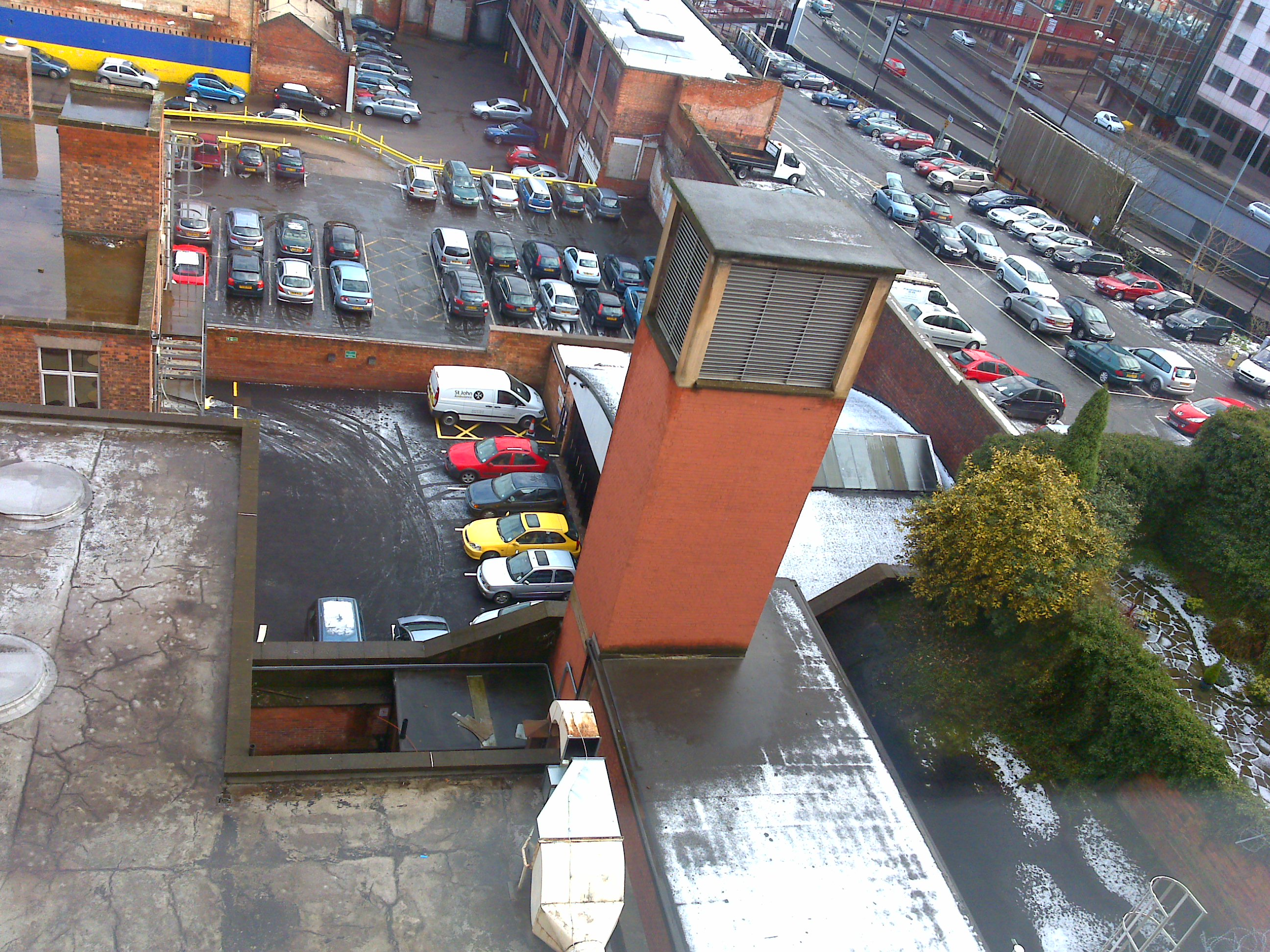
Ventilation shaft, seen from Canterbury House

It was subsequently augmented and superseded by a transit switching centre (TSC) equipped with a crossbar switching system (TXK4) which formed part of the transit network. It parented two of the first three GSCs at Worcester and Wolverhampton to go live when the transit network was inaugurated in 1971 which eventually provided universal UK automatic subscriber dialling and was completed in 1979.

The Anchor telephone exchange tunnels are still used to house communication cables. They have been updated with firebreak compartments and hazardous asbestos has been removed. They are continually pumped out because of the city's rising water table.

The exchange took its name from the hallmark of Birmingham Assay Office, which depicts an anchor.

== Nuclear bunker ==
The exchange was one of three, along with the Kingsway Exchange in London and the Guardian Exchange in Manchester, which provided hardened facilities in order to protect communications in the event of a nuclear attack during the Cold War in the UK (a fourth one was rumoured to exist in Glasgow, but no evidence of this has been found). In common with most civil defence structures of the time it was designed to withstand an attack by an atomic bomb short of a direct hit. By the time of its completion in 1957, the development of thermonuclear weapons with their significantly increased explosive power would have reduced the ability to resist an attack.

The public was told that the project was to provide the city with a new underground rail network, but that by 1956 the project was no longer needed due to costs. There was an entrance at the rear of Telephone House, between Lionel Street and Fleet Street, where there was a strict security check upon entering; this entrance had a heavy blast door weighing about two tonnes. Another entrance was on Newhall Street.

== See also ==
- BT Tower, Birmingham
