= Kingsway telephone exchange =

Cold War telephone exchange under London

Coordinates: 51.5180°N 0.1105°W

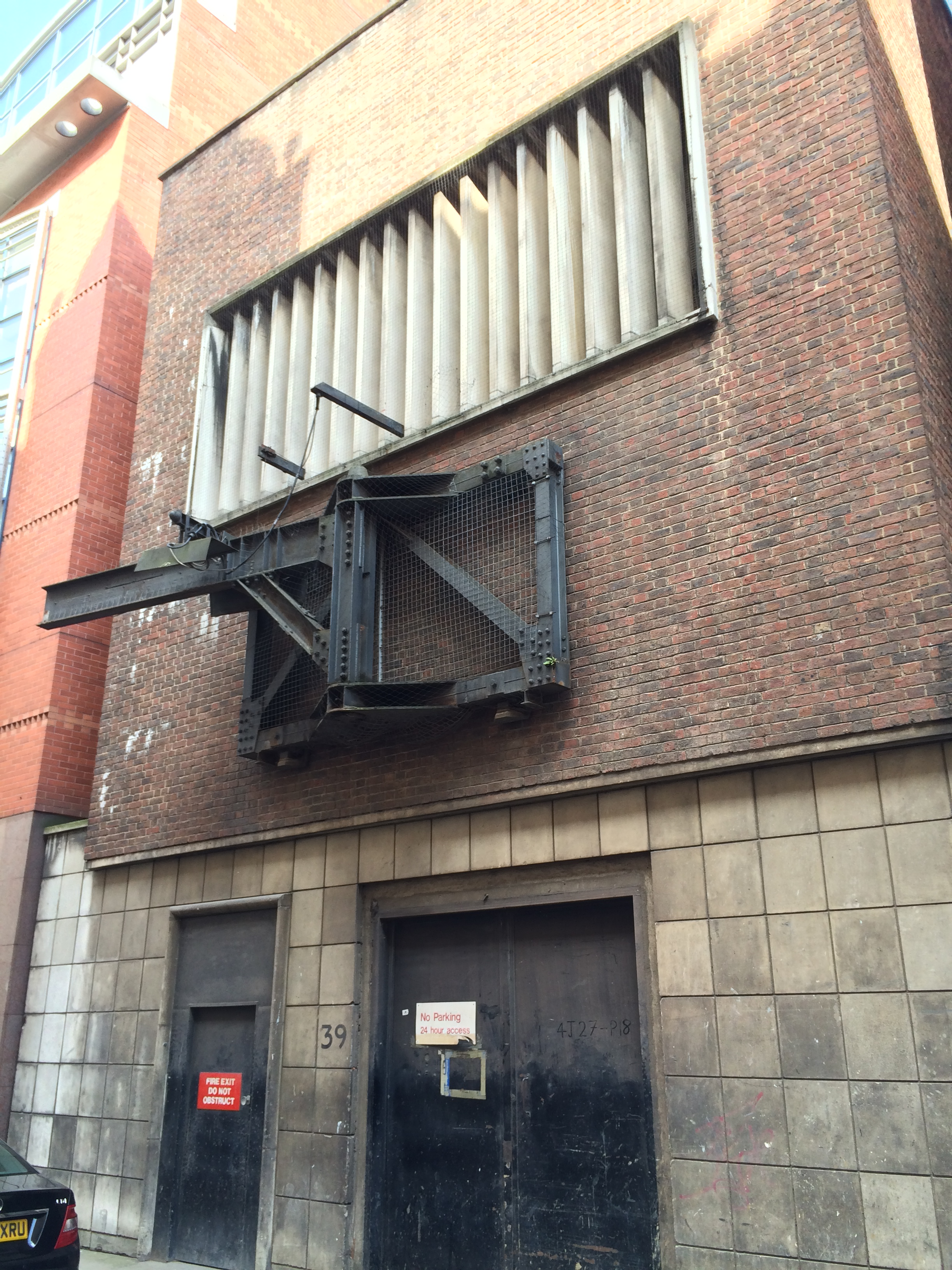
Entrance to Kingsway Telephone Exchange at 39 Furnival Street

Kingsway telephone exchange was a Cold War-era hardened telephone exchange underneath Chancery Lane tube station in High Holborn in London. Initially built as a deep-level air-raid shelter in the early 1940s, it was instead used as a government communications centre. In 1949 the General Post Office (GPO) took over the building, and in 1956 it became the UK termination point for TAT-1, the first transatlantic telephone cable. Closure of the facility began in the 1980s. It was built together with underground exchanges in Birmingham and Manchester, and was originally covered by a D-Notice.

== History ==
1959 plan
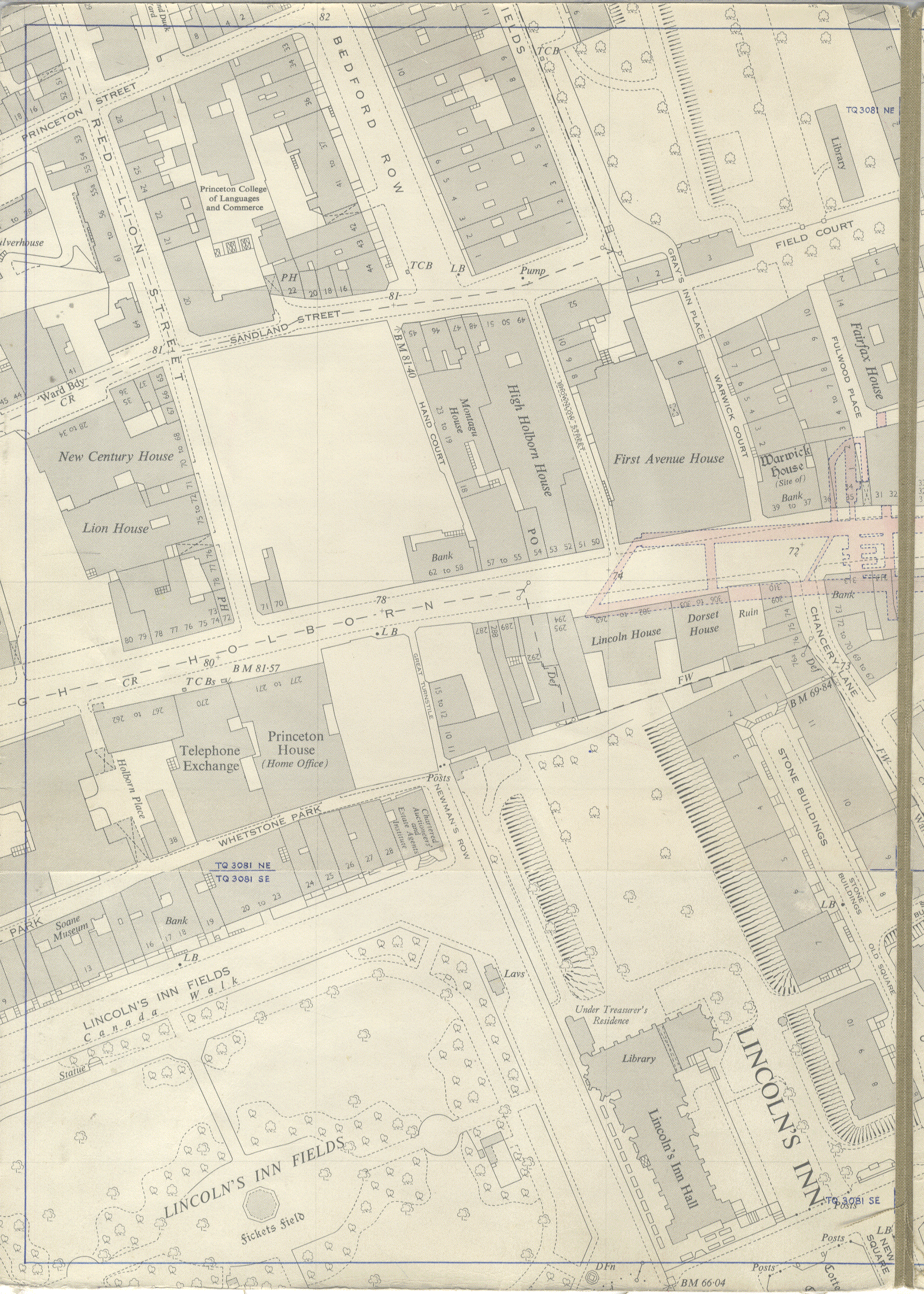
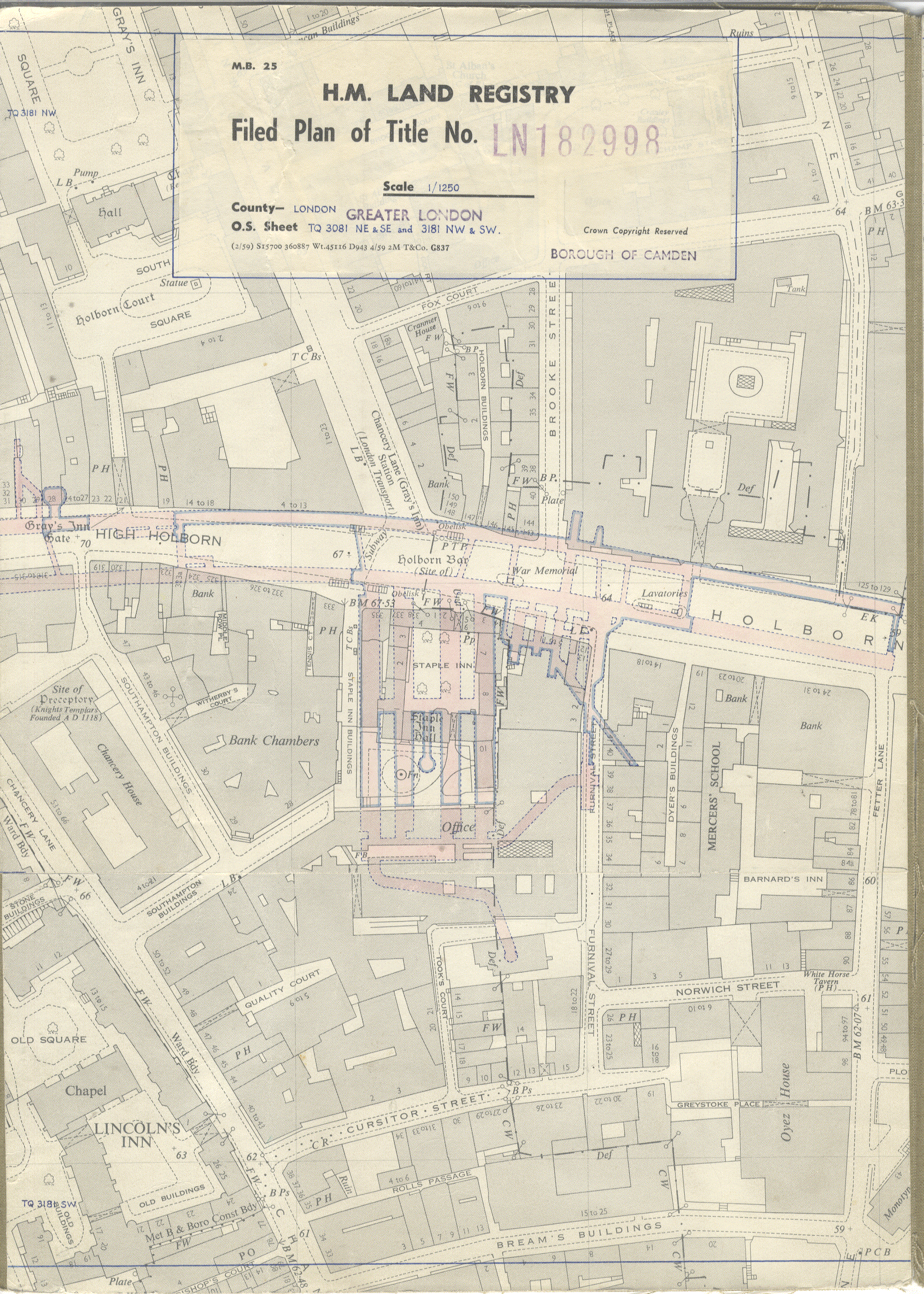
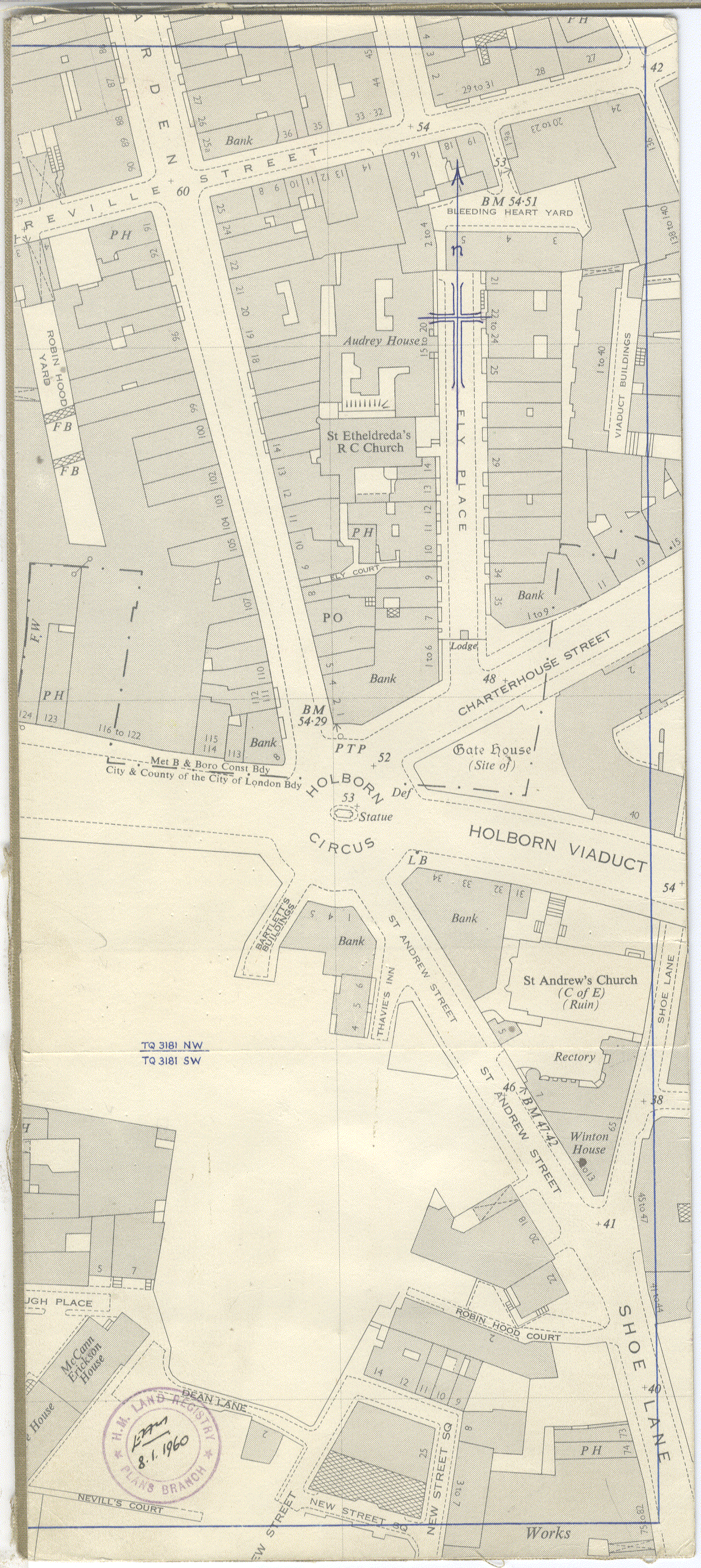
Land Registry map, in three parts, showing the exchange in pink (1959)

The Kingsway telephone exchange was built as a deep-level shelter underneath Chancery Lane tube station in the early 1940s, consisting of two east–west aligned tunnels, one on each side of the Central Line. Although intended for use as an air raid shelter, like many of the deep level shelters, it was not used for its intended purpose and was instead used as a government communications centre. Material from the Public Record Office was stored there from 1945 to 1949.

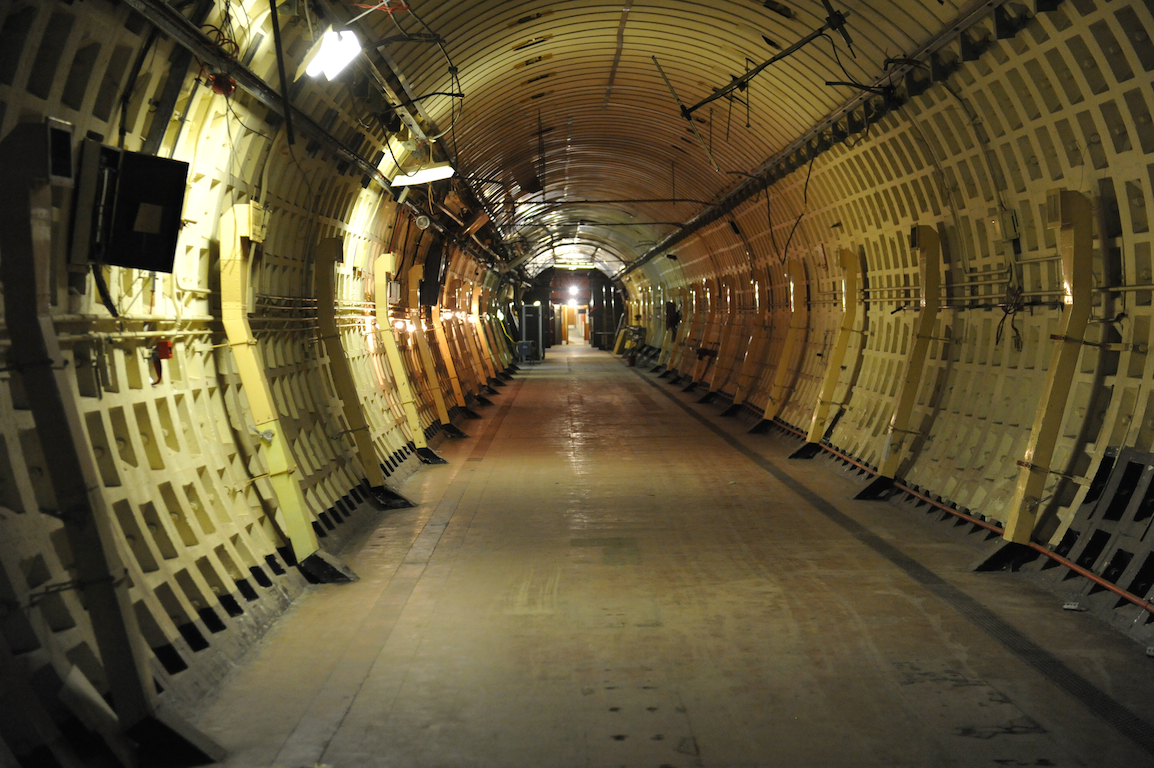
The tunnel in 2014

The site was given to the General Post Office in 1949. At the time, the Post Office was also responsible for telephones as well as postal system. The two-tunnel shelter was extended by the addition of four shorter tunnels, at right angles to the original pair. This extension was completed by 1954, and the exchange opened on 30 October 1954. In 1956 it became the UK termination point for TAT-1, the first transatlantic telephone cable.

Throughout the 1960s, 1970s and early 1980s, Kingsway Trunk Switching Centre (as it became known) was a trunk switching centre and repeater station with Post Office engineering staff totalling over 200 at its peak. After the exchange was wound down the site was used for the Radio Interference Investigation Group, whose function was to prevent television viewers and radio listeners in north and central London from suffering interference to their service from external sources such as thermostats, fluorescent tubes and injection moulding equipment. The country's first radio paging terminal was also installed on this site in the 1970s. In the 1980s it housed Kingsway Computer Centre, a backup for ICARUS (international circuit allocation record update system)

The site had a staff restaurant, tea bar, games room and licensed bar. Its bar claimed to be the deepest in the United Kingdom, at about 200 feet (60 metres) below street level. The site contained an artesian well and rations to maintain several hundred people for many months, to try to ensure a safe environment in case of nuclear attack.

By the early 1980s the site was subject to a phased closure after large quantities of blue asbestos were found on the site. By 1995 only the main distribution frame was still in service. This reportedly has been removed. Also in the 1990s two of the eastmost tunnels became a bunker of sorts, possibly a temporary home for PINDAR (the Kingsway tunnels had been considered for use as a backup facility in the 1980s). This was abandoned by 1996.

In October 2008, British Telecom announced that the tunnels were for sale.

=== London Tunnels ===
In November 2023, BT Group agreed to sell the tunnels to The London Tunnels, a UK-based group backed by a private equity fund, which planned to restore and preserve them and open them to the public for the first time. Subject to planning approval, working with architect WilkinsonEyre, The London Tunnels' vision is to create an interactive cultural experience, with an operational capacity of two million visitors per year. The plans envisage investing around £140m on restoring, preserving and fitting-out the site, then £80m on immersive technology and screens. The venue would open to the public in 2027 and would involve the rebuilding of the Furnival Street entrance. In June 2024, City of London Corporation planners approved the £220m scheme; Camden Council approved the scheme in July 2024.

== Entrances ==
Kingsway Telephone Exchange has two entrances. One is next to a shopfront at 32 High Holborn, the other is a goods lift on Furnival Street. A third access point, a combination of ventilation towers and a passenger lift at Tooks Court, was demolished in 2001.

== Fiction ==
The Exchange features in the third of James Herbert's The Rats trilogy Domain, as a place where survivors of a nuclear attack on London take shelter.

Once home to MI6's Special Operations Executive, the tunnels are referenced by Ian Fleming (who worked as an SOE liaison officer) in his first James Bond book Casino Royale as the location of M's Q Branch laboratories.

== See also ==
- Anchor Exchange - Birmingham
- Guardian Exchange - Manchester
- London deep-level shelters
