= Guardian telephone exchange =

Underground, hardened telephone exchange in Manchester

Coordinates: 53°28′40″N 2°14′29″W

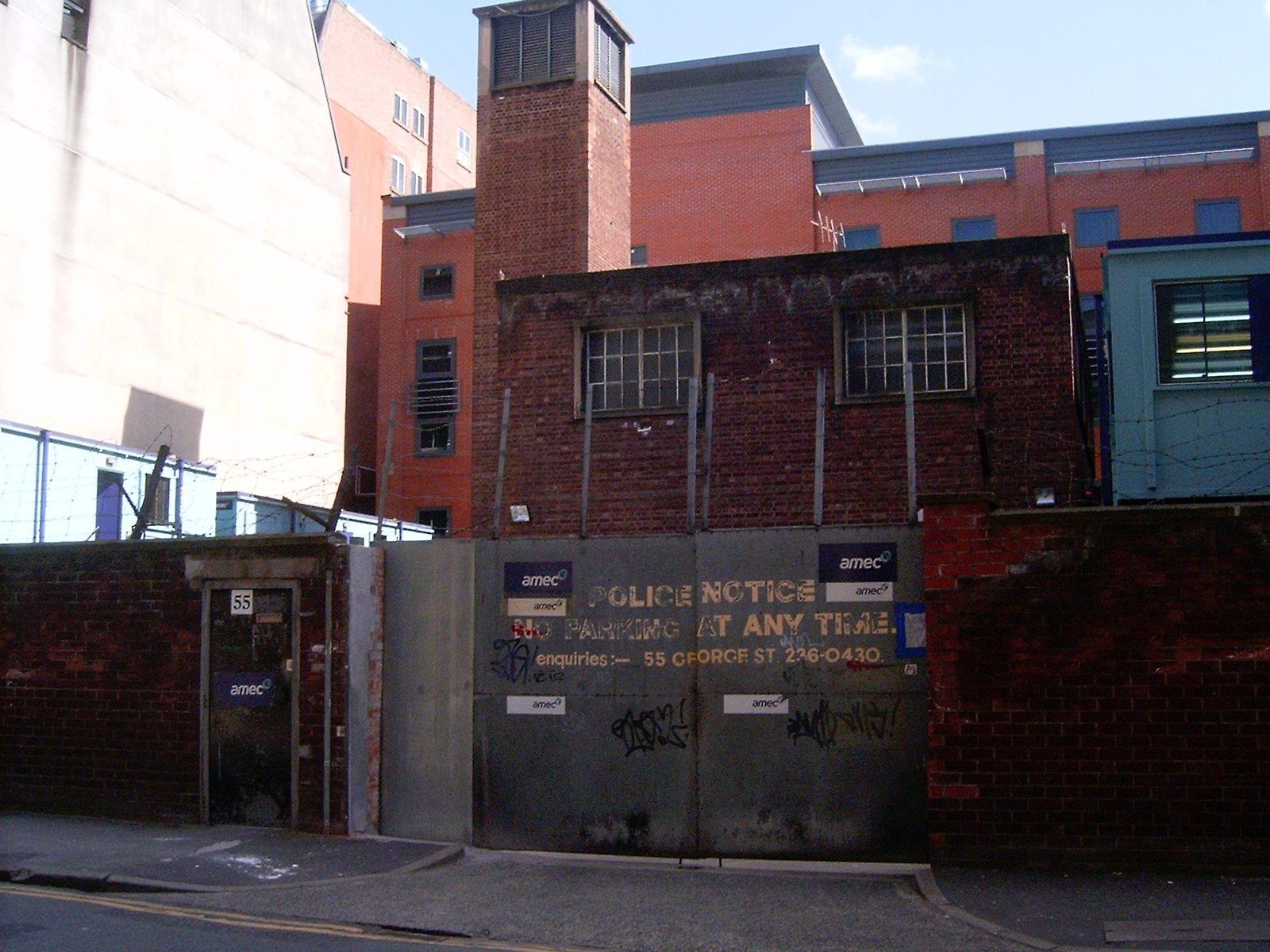
Entrance to the Guardian Exchange, Manchester. The entrance is on George Street, between Princess Street and Dickinson Street in Manchester City Centre

Guardian Exchange was an underground telephone exchange built in Manchester from 1954 to 1957. It was built together with the Anchor exchange in Birmingham and the Kingsway exchange in London – all believed to provide hardened communications in the event of nuclear war; as well as linking the UK government in London to the US Government in Washington, D.C. by means of a secure and hardened transatlantic telephone cable making landfall near Oban and running through Glasgow, Manchester and Birmingham. Today, the underground site is used for telephone cabling. Constructed at a depth of below 35 metres (115 ft), the tunnels are about 2 metres (80 in) in diameter. The exchange cost around £4 million (approximately £126 million in 2015 prices), part of which was funded by the United Kingdom's NATO partners.

== History ==
Construction began following the clearance of the land between York Street and Piccadilly Bus Station, for the building of The Piccadilly Plaza complex. The site was surrounded by high, wooden fencing and it was hoped that no-one would suspect that the 'foundation works' were taking an inordinately long time. Huge amounts of construction materials entered the site, over a long period of time, before any above-ground works could be sighted.

The Guardian exchange equipment was housed in two levels of tunnels beginning under the lower levels of the Piccadilly Plaza and extending south-west under the old 'Central' telephone exchange, on (New) York Street, and following the line of George Street into Manchester's China Town. A pedestrian staircase led down from the former telephone exchange, which has now been sold off as an office block. A large diameter, vertical shaft descends from an anonymous-looking yard on George Street, (See above photo). This contains a large goods lift and crane, by which all the equipment was installed and, subsequently, removed. In the event of hostilities, the shaft could be sealed by a huge, swinging blast cover. Two long cable tunnels lead east and west away from the main complex. The eastern tunnel terminates in the cable chamber of Ardwick Telephone Exchange, with a maintenance and ventilation shaft near to the junction of the Mancunian Way and London Road. The western tunnel runs under the River Irwell and terminates in the lower cable chamber of Dial House in Salford (the main central Manchester telephone exchange). This tunnel also has small, maintenance and ventilation shafts.

As well as the Trunk Telephone Exchange, the main complex also housed large diesel power generators, air scrubbers, sleeping quarters, kitchen, food storage and dining area and even a well furnished bar with Formica tables, banquette and stool seating, piano and pool table. Just as at the GPO Club, under the old Central Post Office in Spring Gardens, there were fake windows, with murals of outdoor scenes, to make it less claustrophobic.

With all the equipment now removed, the main tunnels are empty and bare. The main, pedestrian entrance shaft, from the old telephone exchange, has been filled in and no evidence now remains within the present office building. The main equipment lift-shaft, with its huge, swinging blast door, in the yard on George Street, still remains. The complex now serves only as a cross-city cable route, between Ardwick and Dial House Telephone exchanges.

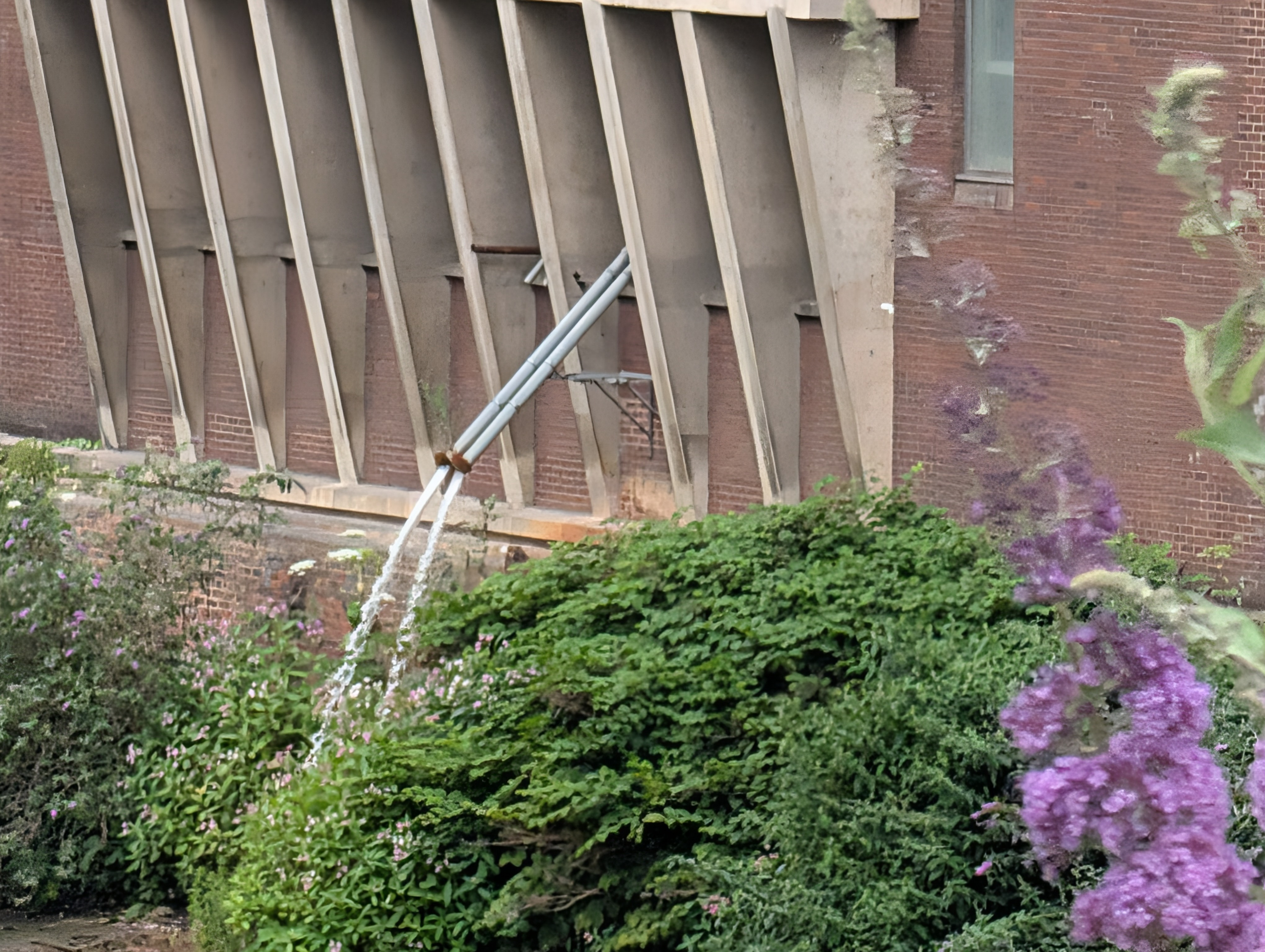
Water being pumped out of the tunnels

Guardian is excavated within coal measures having a high water content; so that the tunnels are constantly filling with ground-water, and must be continually pumped out through an outflow pipe that can be seen discharging into the river Irwell alongside Blackfriars Bridge. The former main entrance on George Street is no longer used but the lift is maintained. All access is now via Dial House and Ardwick telephone exchanges. There is also a service riser, within the Piccadilly Plaza, providing radio-communications cabling to the roof of the City Tower (ex Bernard Sunley Building) for emergency radio services, and microwave link antennas.

=== Use as a nuclear bunker ===
The Guardian Bunker has been called the "Best kept secret in Manchester" and its existence was only publicly acknowledged in 1968, 14 years after initial construction.

=== Use as a telephone exchange ===
The tunnels are known to be used for British Telecom cables. The exchange rose to prominence in March 2004 when a fire in one of the tunnels caused 130,000 telephone lines in Manchester to be cut off. Ambulance and fire service calls around the North West region were also severely affected.
