= Dial House, Salford =

BT technical and administration building in Greater Manchester

Coordinates: 53.4844°N 2.2474°W

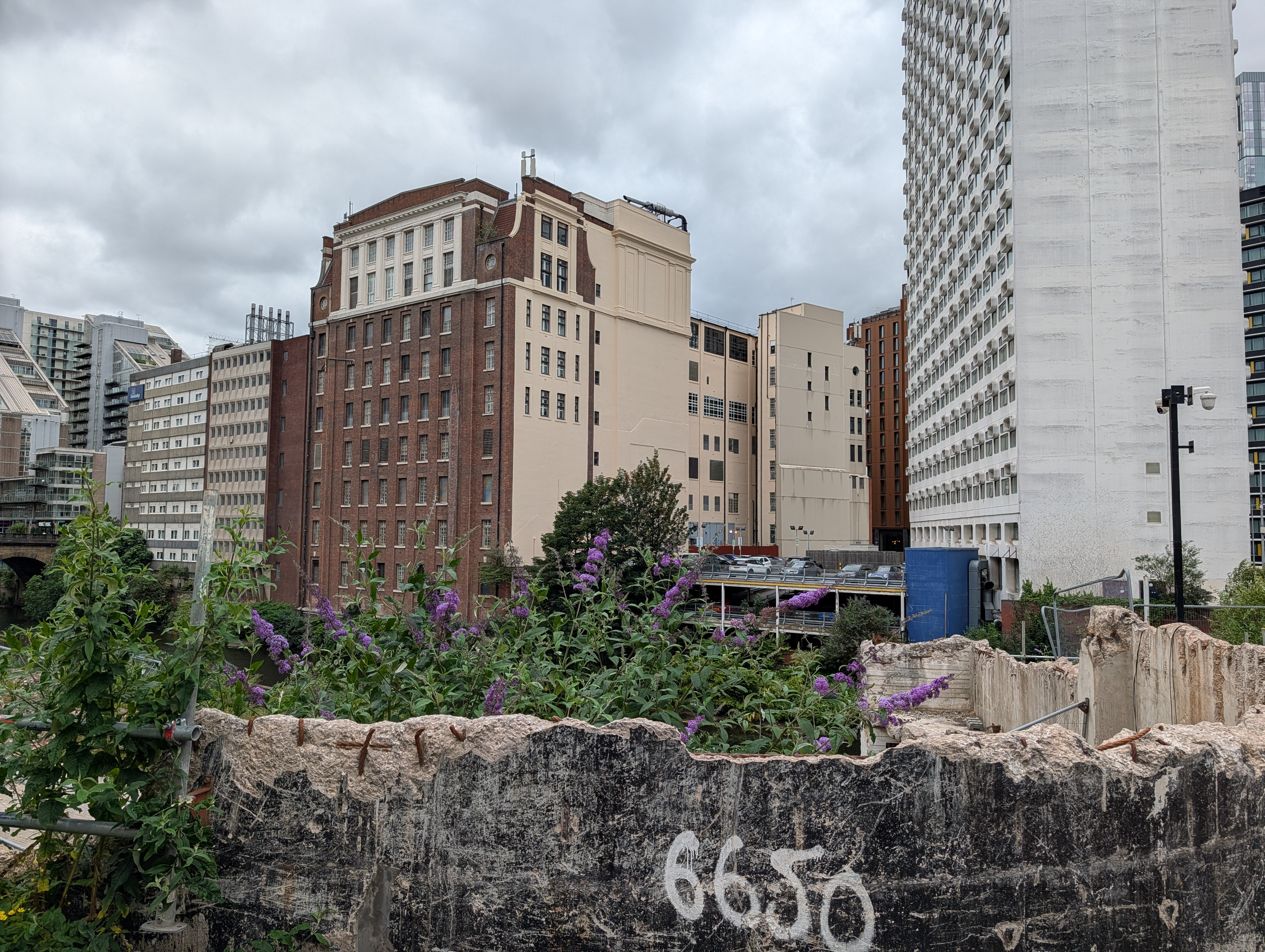
Dial House, seen from across the river

Dial House is a large BT telephone exchange, network connection site and administration building in Salford, Greater Manchester, in the United Kingdom. The building dates back to the 1930s, and was built for HM Office of Works by J. Gerrard and Sons of Swinton. It was formerly named Telephone House. At the time of its construction, it was described as the largest telephone exchange building in the world.

The building contains Manchester's Blackfriars and Deansgate telephone exchanges. It played a pivotal part in the expansion of telecommunications and broadcasting in the United Kingdom in the 20th century. It was at one point part of the British Telecom microwave network. It is one of the sites interconnected by the Guardian telephone exchange tunnel network built during the Cold War.

== See also ==
- Telephony in Greater Manchester
