= History of Manchester =

History of the city of Manchester, England

Manchester Town Hall

The history of Manchester encompasses its change from a minor township in Lancashire to an industrial metropolis in the United Kingdom and the world. Manchester began expanding "at an astonishing rate" around the turn of the 19th century as part of a process of unplanned urbanisation brought on by a boom in textile manufacture during the Industrial Revolution. The transformation took little more than a century.

Having evolved from a Roman castrum in Celtic Britain, in the Victorian era Manchester was a major locus of the Industrial Revolution, and was the site of one of the world's first passenger railway stations as well as important scientific achievements. Manchester also led the political and economic reform of 19th-century Britain as the vanguard of free trade. The mid-20th century saw a decline in Manchester's industrial importance, prompting a depression in social and economic conditions. Subsequent investment, gentrification and rebranding from the 1990s onwards changed its fortunes and reinvigorated Manchester as a post-industrial city with multiple sporting, broadcasting and educational institutions.

Manchester has been on a provisional list for UNESCO World Heritage City on numerous occasions. However, since the 1996 bombing, local authorities have persisted on a course of economic evolution rather than prioritising the past. This economic evolution is perhaps best illustrated with the 558-foot (170-metre) Beetham Tower which instantly "torpedoed" any possibility of World Heritage City status according to one author. Despite this, areas perceived as internationally important in the Industrial Revolution, such as Castlefield and Ancoats, have been sympathetically redeveloped.

== Toponymy ==
The name Manchester originates from the Latin name Mamucium or its variant Mancunio. These names are generally thought to represent a Latinisation of an original Brittonic name. The generally accepted etymology of this name is that it comes from Brittonic *mamm- ("breast", in reference to a "breast-like hill"). However, more recent work suggests that it could come from *mamma ("mother", in reference to a local river goddess). Both usages are preserved in Insular Celtic languages, such as mam meaning "breast" in Irish and "mother" in Welsh. The suffix -chester is from Old English ceaster ("Roman fortification", itself a loanword from Latin castra, "fort; fortified town").

The Latin name for Manchester is often given as Mancuniun. This is most likely a neologism coined in Victorian times, similar to the widespread Latin name Cantabrigia for Cambridge (whose actual name in Roman times was Duroliponte).

== Prehistory ==
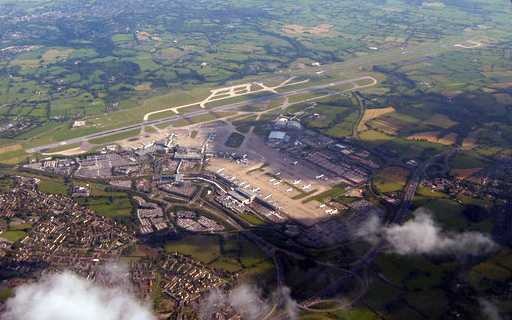
Runway 2 of Manchester Airport lies on top of Oversley Farm, a Neolithic farming community.

Prehistoric evidence of human activity in the area of Manchester is limited, although scattered stone tools have been found.

There is evidence of Bronze Age activity around Manchester in the form of burial sites. Although some prehistoric artefacts have been discovered in the city centre, these have come from redeposited layers, meaning they do not necessarily originate from where they were found; wider evidence has been found for activity in other parts of the borough. Before the Roman invasion of Britain, the location lay within the territory dominated by the Brigantes and prior to the Roman conquest of the area in the 70s AD, it was part of the territory of the Brigantes, a Celtic tribe, although it may have been under the control of the Setantii, a sub-tribe of the Brigantes.

For the important prehistoric farm site at Oversley Farm, see Oversleyford § Oversley Farm.

== Roman ==
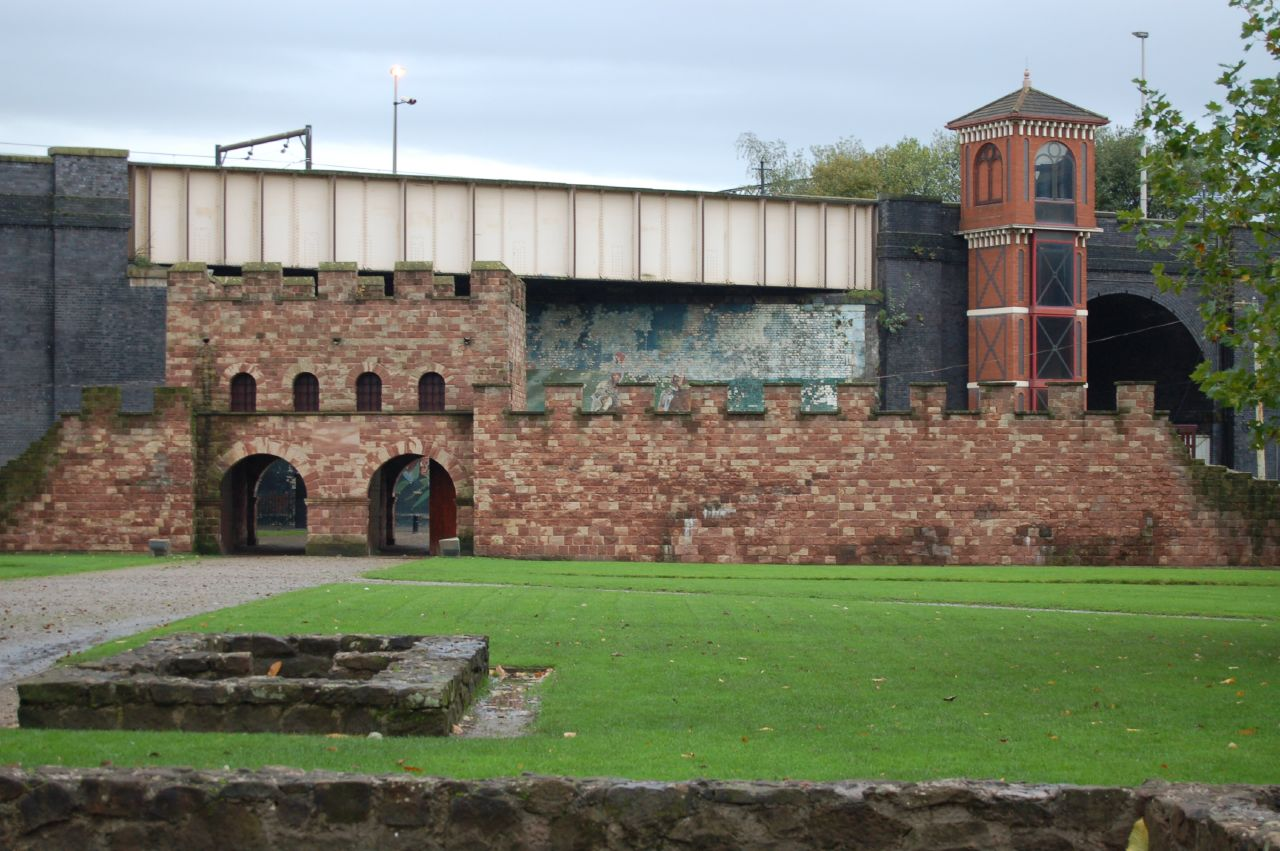
A reconstructed gateway of Mamucium fort

The Roman fort of Mamucium was established c. AD 79 near a crossing point on the River Medlock. The fort was sited on a sandstone bluff near the confluence of the rivers Medlock and Irwell in a naturally defensible position. It was erected as a series of fortifications established by Gnaeus Julius Agricola during his campaign against the Brigantes who were the Celtic tribe in control of most of what would become northern England. It guards the Deva Victrix (Chester) to Eboracum (York) Roman road running east to west, and a road heading north to Bremetennacum (Ribchester). The neighbouring forts were Castleshaw and Northwich. Built first from turf and timber, the fort was demolished around 140. When it was rebuilt around 160, it was again of turf and timber construction. In about 200 the fort underwent another rebuild, this time enhancing the defences by replacing the gatehouse with a stone version and facing the walls with stone. The fort would have been garrisoned by a cohort, about 500 infantry, of auxiliary troops.

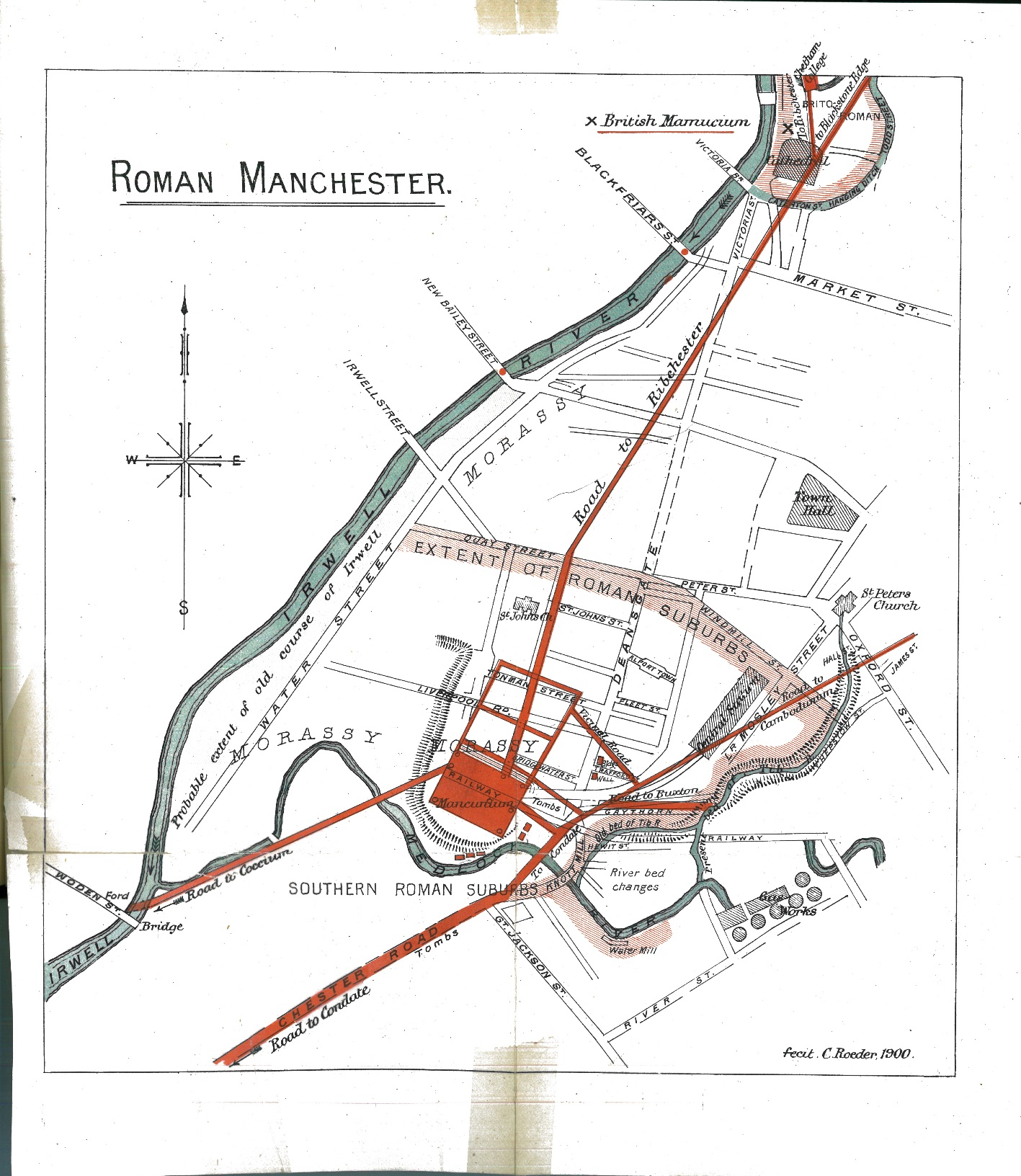
Map of Manchester from Roman Manchester (1900)

Evidence of both pagan and Christian worship has been discovered. Two altars have been discovered and there may be a temple of Mithras associated with Mamucium. A word square was discovered in the 1970s, which may be one of the earliest examples of Christianity in Britain. A civilian settlement (the first in Manchester), or vicus, grew in association with the fort, made up of traders and families of the soldiers. An area that has a concentration of furnaces and industrial activity has been described as an industrial estate. The vicus was probably abandoned by the mid 3rd century, although a small garrison may have remained at Mamucium into the late 3rd and early 4th centuries. The Castlefield area of Manchester is named after the fort.

== Post-Roman ==
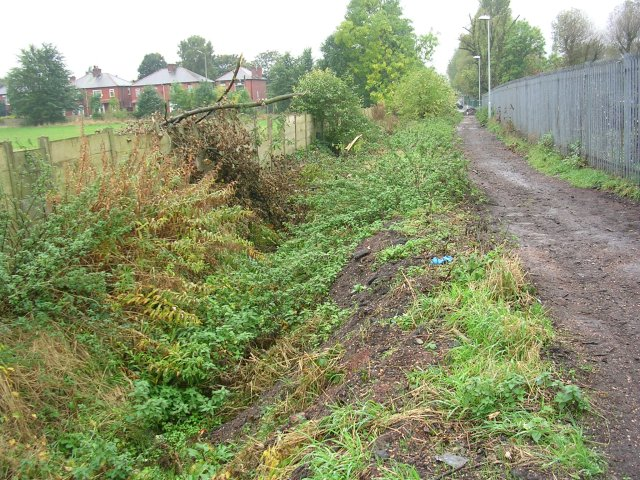
Looking west along Nico Ditch, near Levenshulme

Once the Romans left Britain, the focus of settlement in Manchester shifted to the confluence of the rivers Irwell and Irk. During the Early Middle Ages that followed – and persisted until the Norman Conquest – the settlement of Manchester was in the territory of several different kingdoms. In the late 6th and early 7th centuries, the kingdom of Northumbria extended as far south as the River Mersey, south of what was then the settlement of Manchester. Etymological evidence indicates that the areas to the north west of Manchester (such as Eccles and Chadderton) were British while the parts of Manchester (such as Clayton, Gorton and Moston) were Anglian, and the south west of Manchester was Danish (including Cheadle Hulme, Davyhulme, Hulme and Levenshulme).

Between the 6th and 10th centuries, the kingdoms of Northumbria, Mercia and Wessex struggled for control over North West England. In 620, Edwin of Northumbria may have sacked Manchester, and the settlement may have been sacked again in 870 by the Danes. According to legend, Nico Ditch – which runs east–west from Ashton-under-Lyne to Stretford and passes through Gorton, Levenshulme, Burnage, Rusholme, Platt Field Park in Fallowfield, Withington and Chorlton-cum-Hardy – is a defence against Viking invaders and was dug in 869–870. Whether this is true is uncertain, but the ditch does date from between the 7th and 9th centuries. The Anglo Saxon Chronicle detail that in 919 Edward the Elder sent men "to Mameceaster, in Northumbria, to repair and man it"; this probably refers to a burh at Manchester as an advanced post of Mercia. Although it is unsure where the site is, it is possibly a reference to the Roman fort. In 1055, most of what later became Lancashire was under the control of Tostig.

The ancient parish of Manchester covered a wider area than today's metropolitan borough (although not including its full extent), and was probably established in the Anglo-Saxon period (there were at that time only two churches in the parish: at Manchester and Ashton-under-Lyne). Forty distinct townships developed in the parish and in medieval times the royal manor of Salford was the most important of these.

== Medieval ==
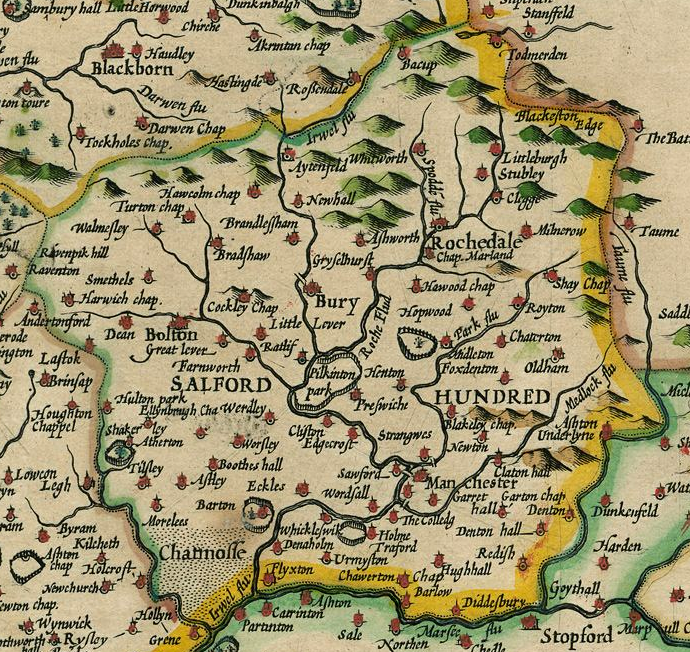
Map of the Salford Hundred, with Manchester in the south-east

Map of the ancient parish of Manchester

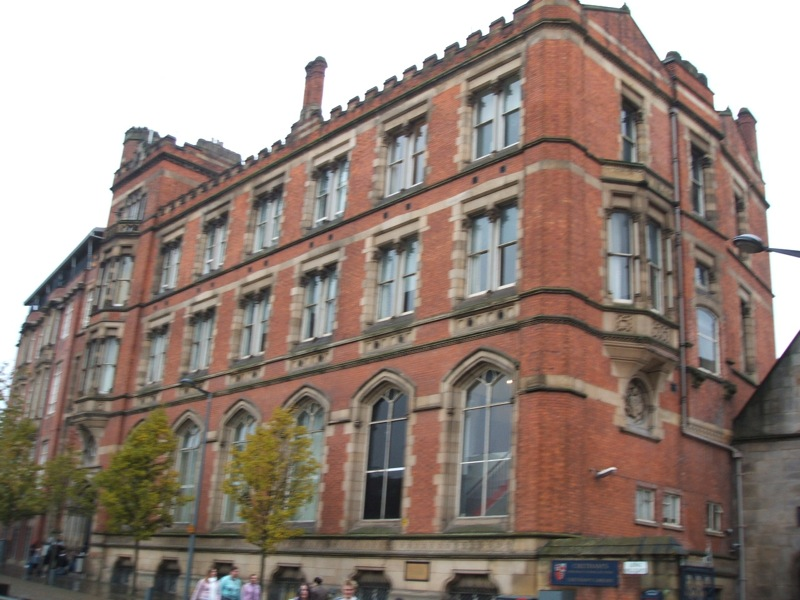
Chetham's School of Music

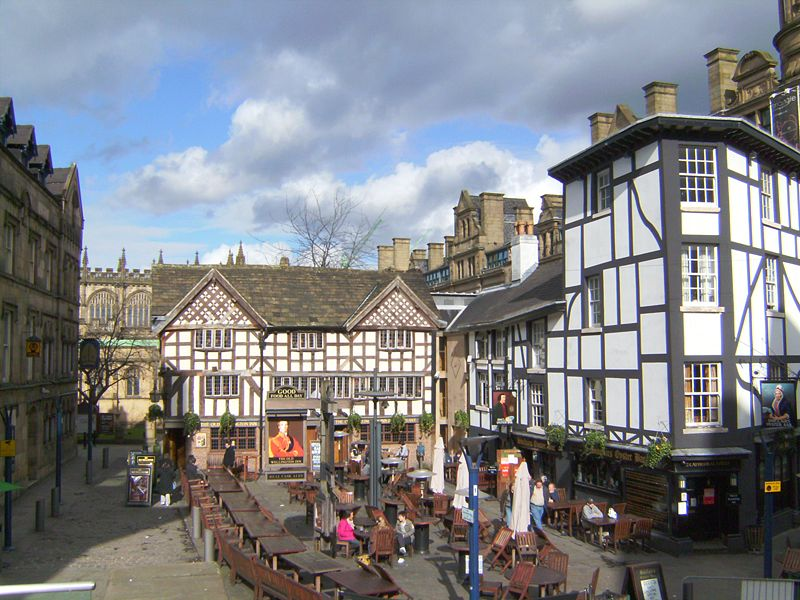
Old Wellington Inn Shambles Square was built in 1552.

Manchester was administratively part of the Salford Hundred. In 1086 the hundred covered about 350 square miles (910 km^{2}) and had a population of about 3,000. It was given to Roger de Poitou; Roger divided the hundred into fiefdoms and made the Gresle family barons of Manchester. Albert de Gresle was the first baron of Manchester. Although the Gresle family did not reside at the manor, Manchester continued to grow in their absence and stewards represented the lords of the manor.

Manchester's entry in the Domesday Book reads "the Church of St Mary and the Church of St Michael hold one carucate of land in Manchester exempt from all customary dues except tax". St Mary's Church was an Anglo-Saxon church on the site of Manchester Cathedral; St Michael's Church may have been in Ashton-under-Lyne. The parish of Manchester – of which St Mary's Church was a part – was the ecclesiastical centre of the Salford Hundred. It covered about 60 square miles (160 km^{2}) and extended as far as the edges of Flixton and Eccles in the west, the Mersey between Stretford and Stockport in the south, the edge of Ashton-under-Lyne in the east, and the edge of Prestwich in the north. That such a large area was covered by a single parish has been taken as evidence of the area's "impoverished and depopulated status". The only tax the parish was subject to was Danegeld.

There was a castle in Manchester overlooking the rivers Irk and Irwell, where Chetham's School of Music stands today. This castle was probably a ringwork and has been described as "of no political or military importance". By the late 13th century, the Grelleys or Gresles, who were barons of Manchester for two centuries, had replaced the castle with a fortified manor house. They used the house as the administrative centre of the manor. While the town was owned by the lords of the manor, they directly leased land to tenants and created burgage tenements for indirect rent; as well as containing a house, these plots of land could also contain workshops and gardens. The family also owned the only corn mill in the manor which was used by all the tenants of the manor to grind their corn. Medieval Manchester was centred on the manor house and the Church of St Mary mentioned in the Domesday Book. As well as a castle at Manchester, there was also one in Ringway. Ullerwood Castle, a motte-and-bailey, probably dates from the 12th century and was owned by Hamon de Massey who owned several manors in the north east of Cheshire.

The first lord of the manor to actually live in Manchester was Robert Grelley (1174–1230); his presence led to an influx of skilled workers, such as stonemasons and carpenters, associated with the construction of the manor house. In the early 13th century, Manchester for a period was not under the control of the Grelleys. Robert Grelley was one of the barons who made King John sign Magna Carta. Grelley was excommunicated for his role in the rebellion and when King John later ignored the terms of Magna Carta, Grelley forfeited his lands. King John died in 1216 and Hubert de Burgh, 1st Earl of Kent, returned Grelley's land to him on behalf of King Henry III In the medieval period Manchester grew into a market town and had a market every Saturday. In 1223, Manchester gained the right to hold an annual fair; the market was held in Acresfield – where St Ann's Square is today – on what was then arable land. It was the first fair to be established in the Salford Hundred and the fourth in south Lancashire. Manchester became a market town in 1301 when it received its charter. On 1 November 1315, Manchester was the starting place of a rebellion by Adam Banastre. Banastre, Henry de Lea, and William de Bradshagh rebelled against Thomas, 2nd Earl of Lancaster.

The medieval town's defences incorporated the rivers Irk and Irwell on two sides and a 450-yard (410 m) long ditch on the others. The ditch, known as Hanging Ditch, was up to 40 yards (37 m) wide and 40 yards (37 m) deep. It was spanned by Hanging Bridge, the main route in and out of the town. The name may derive from hangan meaning hollow, although there is an alternative derivation from the Old English hen, meaning wild birds, and the Welsh gan, meaning between two hills. It dates to at least 1343 but may be even older.

In the 14th century, Manchester became home to a community of Flemish weavers, who settled in the town to produce wool and linen. This in part helped to develop a tradition of cloth production in the region, which in turn sparked the growth of the city to become Lancashire's major industrial centre. The various townships and chapelries of the ancient parish of Manchester became separate civil parishes in 1866.

Thomas de la Warre was a Lord of the manor and also a priest. He obtained licences from the Pope and King Henry V to enable him to found and endow a collegiate church, dedicated to the Blessed Virgin, St. George and St. Denys or St. Denis, the latter two being the patron saints of England and France respectively. Construction began around 1422, and continued until the first quarter of the 16th century. The 'merchant princes' of the town endowed a number of chantry chapels, reflecting an increasing prosperity based on wool. This church later became Manchester Cathedral.

Thomas also gave the site of the old manor house as a residence for the priests. It remains as one of the finest examples of a medieval secular religious building in Britain and is now the home of Chetham's School of Music.

== Growth of the textile trade ==
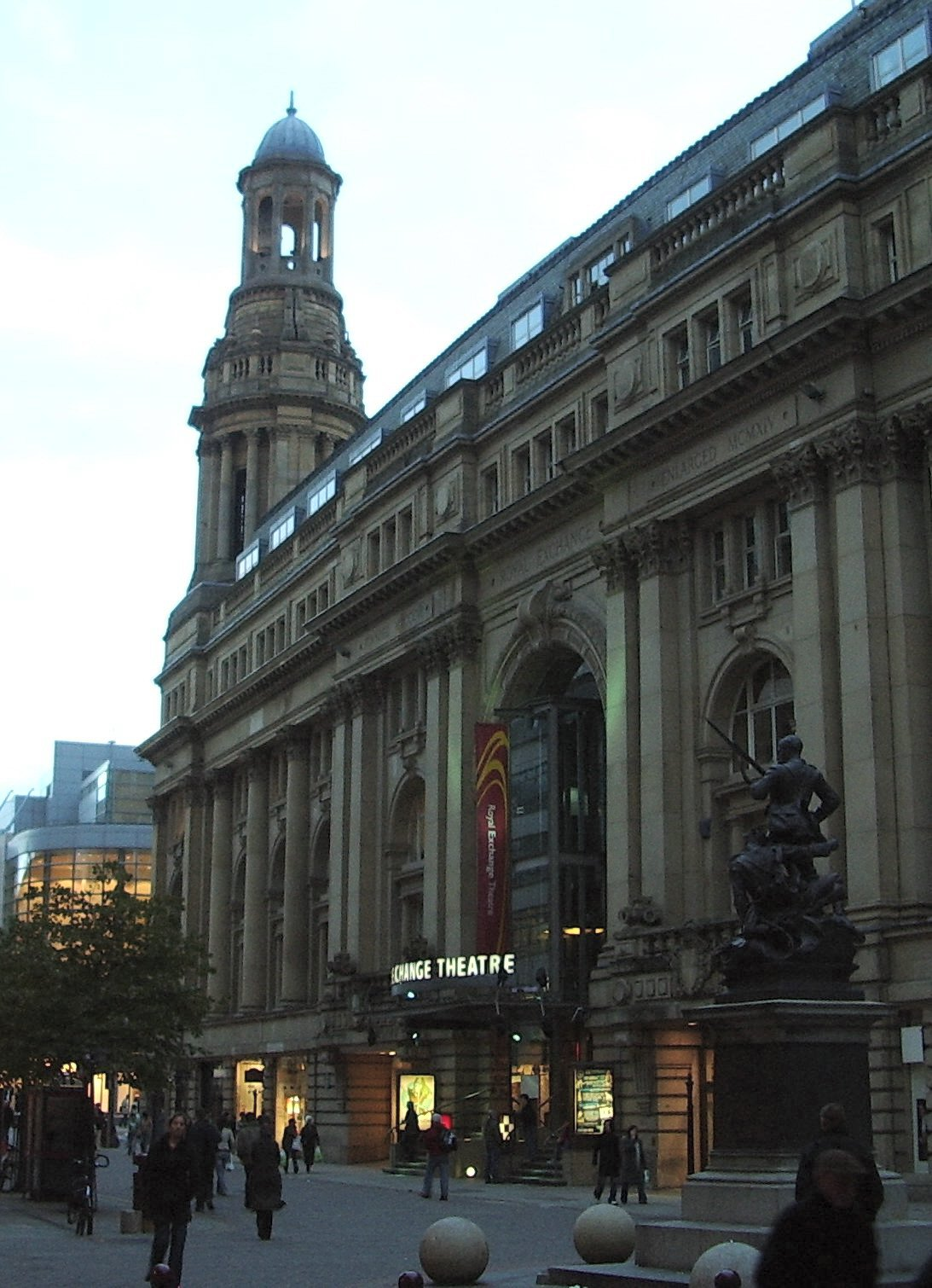
Royal Exchange, Cross Street

By the 16th century, the wool trade had made Manchester a flourishing market town. The collegiate church, which is now the cathedral, was finally completed in 1500–1510. The magnificent carved choir stalls date from this period, and in 1513 work began on a chapel endowed by James Stanley, Bishop of Ely, in thanksgiving for the safe return of his kinsman (sometimes said to be his son) John Stanley from the Battle of Flodden.

The English Reformation resulted in the collegiate church being refounded as a Protestant institution. One of the more famous Wardens of this institution at the time was Dr John Dee, known as "Queen Elizabeth's Merlin".

The town's growth was given further impetus in 1620 with the start of fustian weaving. In this period Manchester grew heavily due to an influx of Flemish settlers who founded Manchester's new weaving industry. In the course of the 17th century, thanks to the development of the textile industry and contacts with the City of London, Manchester became a noted centre of puritanism. Consequently, it sided with Parliament in the quarrel with Charles I. Indeed, it might be said that the English Civil War started here. In 1642, Lord Strange, the Royalist son of the Earl of Derby attempted to seize the militia magazine stored in the old college building. In the ensuing scuffle, Richard Percival, a linen weaver, was killed. He is reckoned by some to be the first casualty in the English Civil War.

Lord Strange returned and attempted to besiege the town, which had no permanent fortifications. With the help of John Rosworm, a German mercenary, the town was vigorously defended. Captain Bradshaw and his musketeers resolutely manned the bridge to Salford. Eventually, Strange realised that his force was ill-prepared, and after hearing that his father had died, withdrew to claim his title.

During the Commonwealth, Manchester was granted a seat in Parliament for the first time. Maj Gen Charles Worsley, scion of an old Lancashire family and one of Cromwell's most trusted lieutenants, had been given the Mace at the famous dissolution of Parliament in 1654. Elected Manchester's first MP, he did not sit for long before Parliament was again dissolved, leading to the Rule of the Major Generals: effectively martial law. Worsley, given responsibility for Lancashire, Cheshire and Staffordshire, took his duties seriously, turning out alehouses, banning bear baiting and cracking down on the celebration of Christmas. He eventually died in 1656, at a time of the gradual ebbing away of Cromwell's authority.

On the English Restoration in 1660, as a reprisal for its defence of the Parliamentarian cause, Manchester was deprived of its recently granted Members of Parliament. No MP was to sit for Manchester until 1832. The consequences of the restoration led to a great deal of soul searching. One clergyman, Henry Newcombe, could not remain in the remodelled Anglican Church, and was instrumental in the establishment of the Cross Street Chapel in 1694. This later passed into Unitarian hands, and a new chapel on the original site can be visited.

Humphrey Chetham purchased the old college buildings after the civil war, and endowed it as a bluecoat school. Chetham's Hospital, as it was known, later became Chetham's School of Music. The endowment included a collection of books, which in 1653 became Chetham's Library, the first free public library in the English-speaking world. As of 2017, it is still open and free to use.

Despite the political setbacks, the town continued to prosper. A number of inhabitants supported the Glorious Revolution in 1688. They became discontented with the Tory clergy at the collegiate church, and a separate church, more to their tastes, was founded by Lady Ann Bland. St Ann's Church is a fine example of an early Georgian church, and was consecrated in 1712. The surroundings, what is now St Ann's Square but was previously known as Acresfield, were in imitation of a London square.

About this time, Defoe described the place as "the greatest mere village in England", by which he meant that a place the size of a populous market town had no form of local government to speak of, and was still subject to the whims of a lord of the manor.

In 1745, Charles Edward Stuart and his army entered Manchester en route to London. Despite its previous radicalism, the town offered no resistance and the Jacobites obtained enough recruits to form a 'Manchester Regiment'. It is suggested that this was because the town had no local government to speak of, and the magistrates, who could have organised resistance, were mostly conservative landowners. Moreover, these Tory landowners had taken to apprenticing their sons to Manchester merchants, so the political complexion of the town's elite had changed. The Jacobite army got no further than Derby and then retreated. On their way back through Manchester, the stragglers were pelted by the mob. The luckless 'Manchester Regiment' were left behind to garrison Carlisle, where they quickly surrendered to the pursuing British Army.

== Industrial Revolution ==
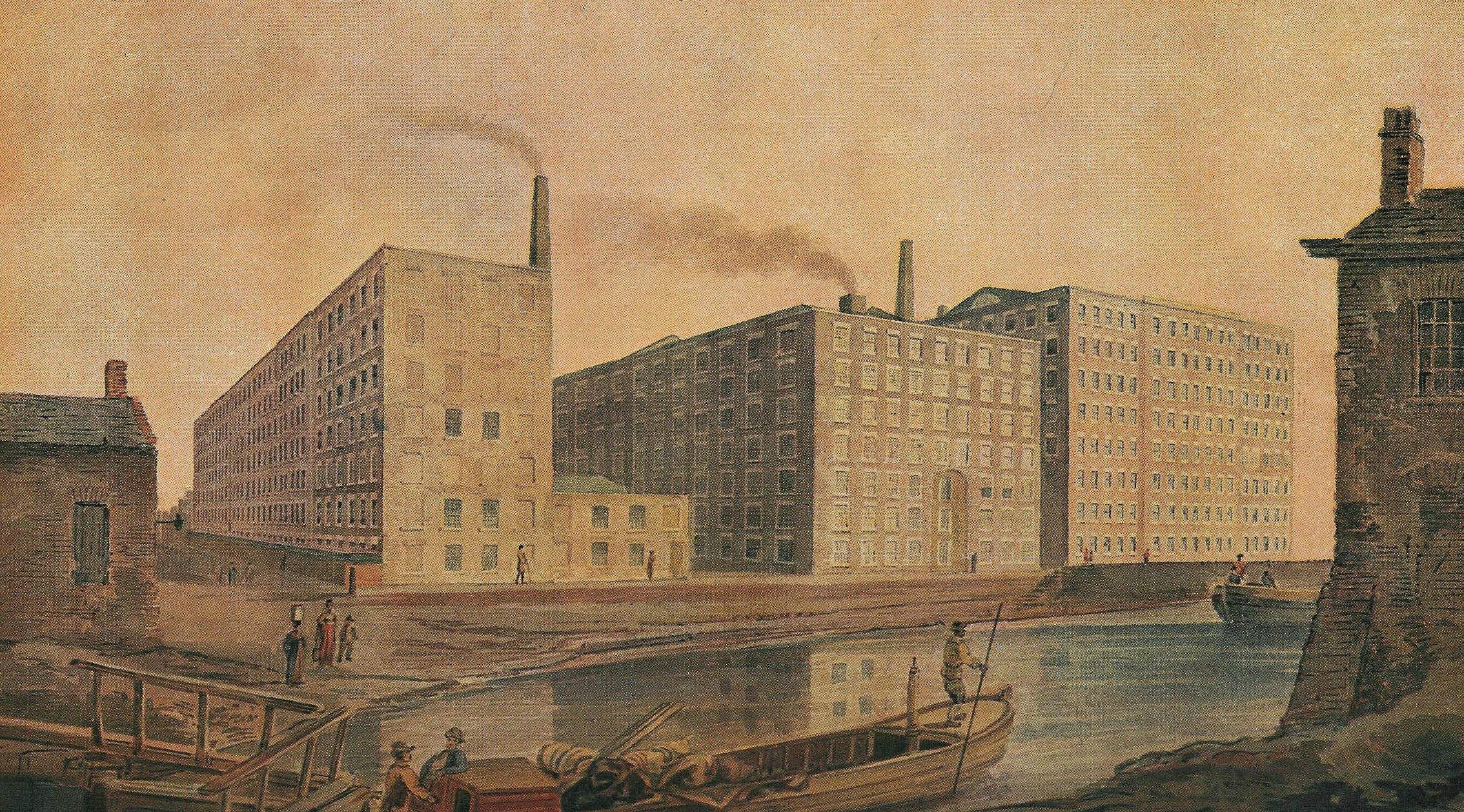
McConnel & Company's cotton mills in Ancoats, c. 1820

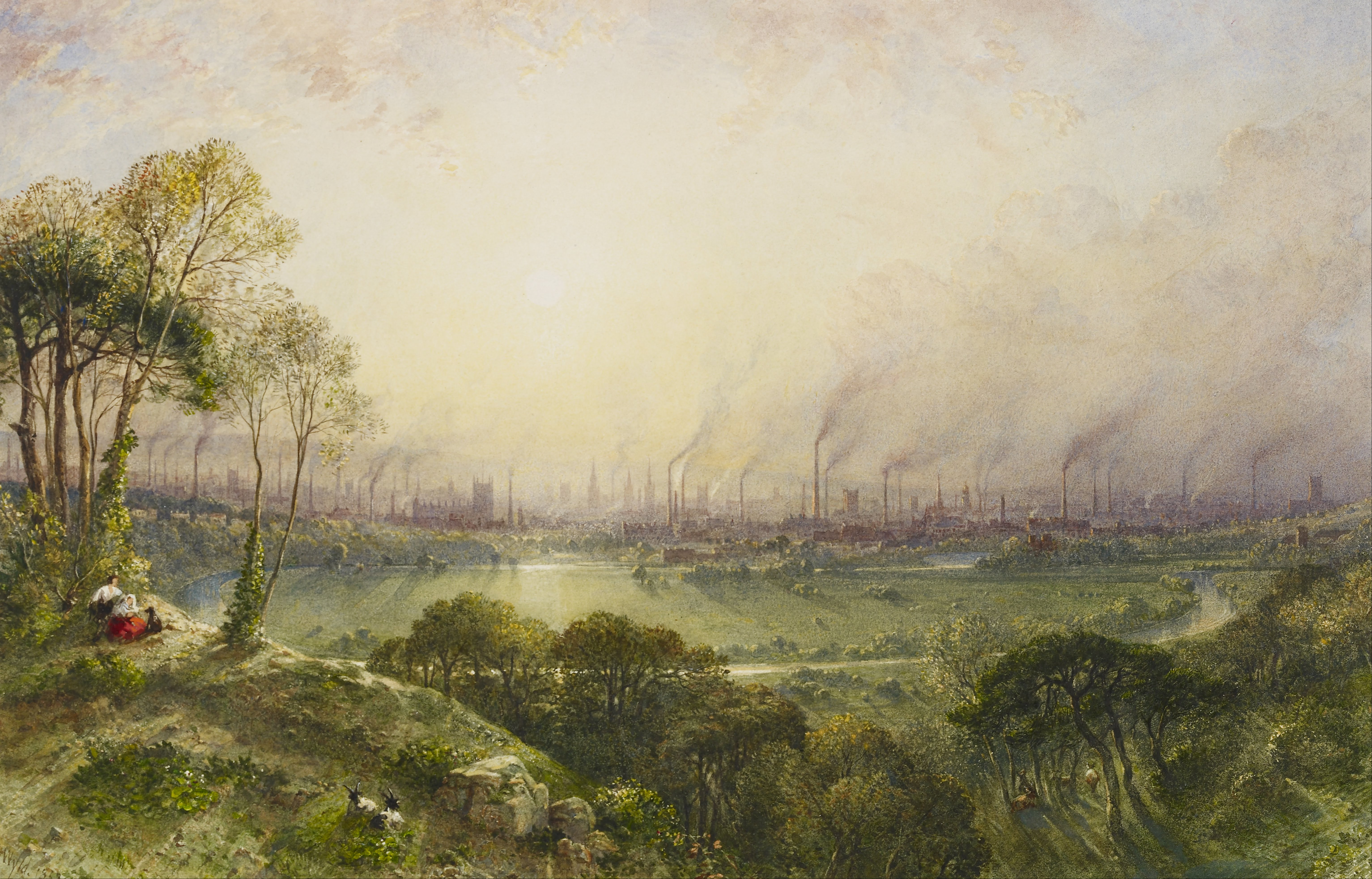
Manchester from Kersal Moor, by William Wyld in 1852. Manchester acquired the nickname "Cottonopolis" during the early 19th century owing to its many textile factories.

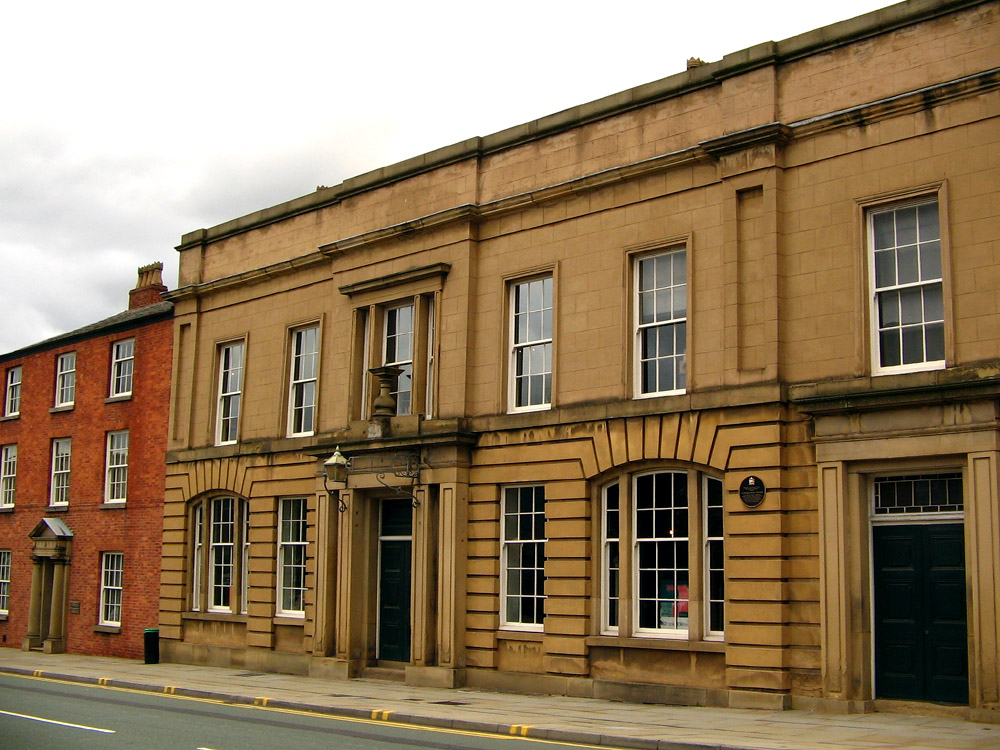
Liverpool Road railway station, the terminus of the Liverpool and Manchester Railway

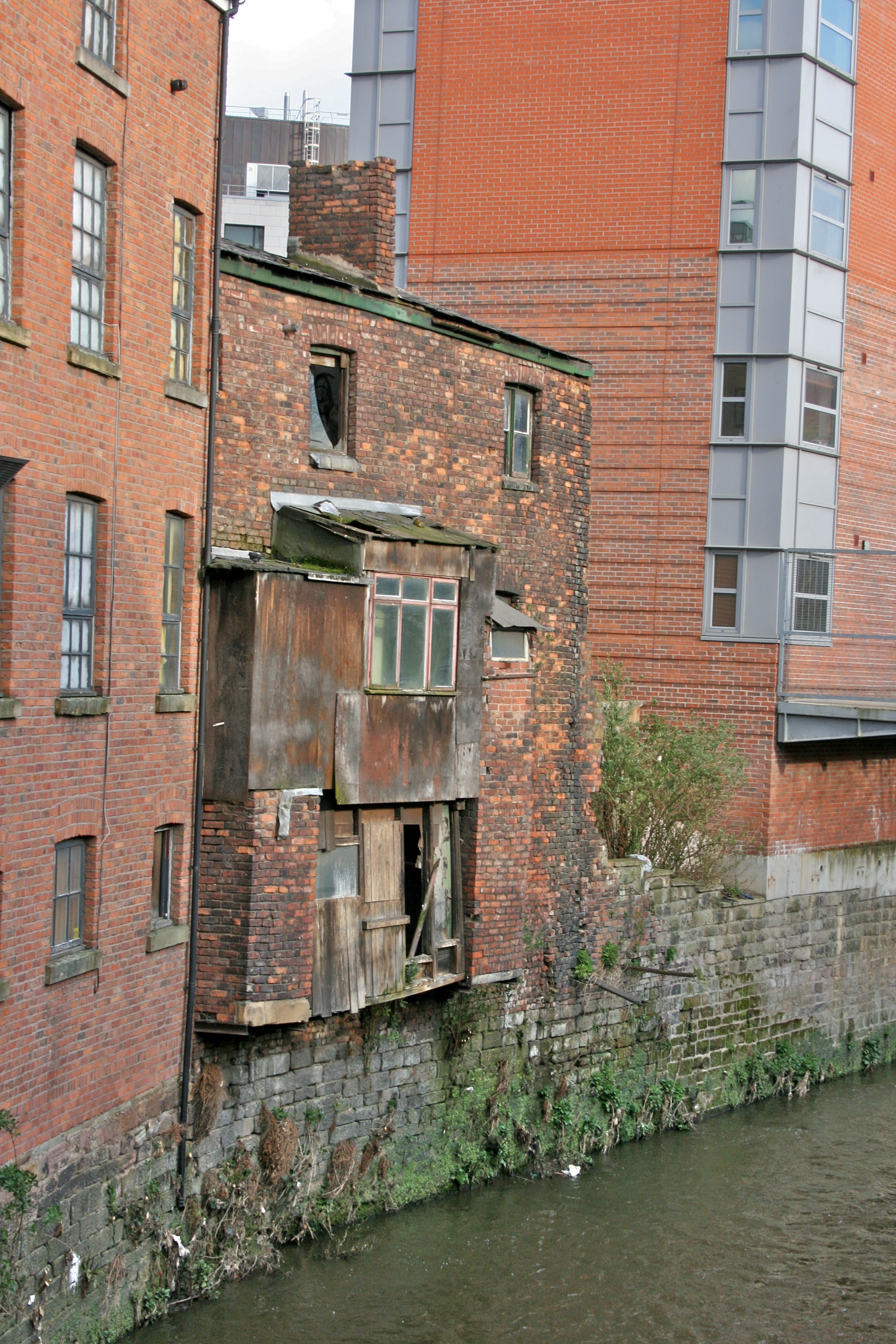
A 19th-century slum dwelling. The overhang contained privies, whose waste fell straight into the River Medlock below.

Manchester remained a small market town until the late 18th century and the beginning of the Industrial Revolution. The Spinning Jenny in 1764 marked the beginning of the Industrial Revolution and brought with it the first fully mechanised production process. The myriad small valleys in the Pennine Hills to the north and east of the town, combined with the damp climate, proved ideal for the construction of water-powered cotton mills such as Quarry Bank Mill, which industrialised the spinning and weaving of cloth.

Indeed, it was the importing of cotton, which began towards the end of the 18th century, that revolutionised the textile industry in the area. This new commodity was imported through the port of Liverpool, which was connected with Manchester by the Mersey and Irwell Navigation—the two rivers had been made navigable from the 1720s onwards.

Manchester now developed as the natural distribution centre for raw cotton and spun yarn, and a marketplace and distribution centre for the products of this growing textile industry. Richard Arkwright is credited as the first to erect a cotton mill in the city. His first experiment, installing a Newcomen steam engine to pump water for a waterwheel failed, but he next adapted a Watt steam engine to directly operate the machinery. The result was the rapid spread of cotton mills throughout Manchester itself and in the surrounding towns. To these must be added bleach works, textile print works, and the engineering workshops and foundries, all serving the cotton industry. During the mid-19th century Manchester grew to become the centre of Lancashire's cotton industry and was dubbed "Cottonopolis", and a branch of the Bank of England was established in 1826.

The city had one of the first telephone exchanges in Europe (possibly the first in the UK) when in 1879 one was opened on Faulkner Street in the city centre using the Bell patent system. By 1881 it had 420 subscribers—just 7 years later a new exchange had the capacity for 10 times that number. Manchester Central exchange was still the largest outside the capital in Edwardian times when it employed 200 operators and the city had several other important roles in the history of telephony.

== Transport ==
The growth of the city was matched by the expansion of its transport links. The growth of steam power meant that demand for coal rocketed. To meet this demand, the first canal of the industrial era, the Duke's Canal, often referred to as the Bridgewater Canal, was opened in 1761, linking Manchester to the coal mines at Worsley. This was soon extended to the Mersey Estuary. Soon an extensive network of canals was constructed, linking Manchester to all parts of England.

One of the world's first public omnibus services began in 1824; it ran from Market Street in Manchester to Pendleton and Salford.

=== The world's first steam passenger railway ===
In 1830, Manchester was again at the forefront of transport technology with the opening of the Liverpool and Manchester Railway, the world's first steam passenger railway. This provided faster transport of raw materials and finished goods between the port of Liverpool and mills of Manchester. By 1838, Manchester was connected by rail with Birmingham and London, and by 1841 with Hull. The existing horse-drawn omnibus services were all acquired by the Manchester Carriage Company, Ltd in 1865. Horse-drawn trams began in Salford (1877) and Manchester (1880–81), were succeeded by electric trams in 1901–03 and by 1930 Manchester Corporation Tramways were running the third largest system in the UK.

== Population ==
The Industrial Revolution resulted in Manchester's population exploding as people moved from other parts of the British Isles into the city seeking new opportunities.

Particularly large numbers came from Ireland, with one area of the city centre becoming known as Little Ireland between 1827 and 1847. Numbers of Irish immigrants increased further after the Great Famine of the 1840s. In 1851, it was estimated that nearly half the men in Ancoats were Irish born, and that 15% of the general population of Manchester were Irish born. The first Irish community in the city was said to date back to 1798 and with further waves of immigration from Ireland coming after the Second World War. The Irish influence continues to this day and, every March Manchester plays host to a large St Patrick's Day parade. It is estimated that about 35% of the population of Manchester and Salford has some Irish ancestry.

Scottish migration in to Manchester can be traced back to before 1745 when the Jacobites marched through the city but the population of Scottish born residents peaked at almost 2% of the city's total population in 1871. Many of the city's machine making firms which powered the Industrial Revolution had their roots in emigrant Scottish engineers.

A Welsh community has existed in Manchester since the 16th century. In 1892 there was 80,000 Welsh born residents in the North West of England with particularly high concentrations in Manchester and Liverpool. David Lloyd George was born in the city and Welsh socialist Robert Jones Derfel spent much of his life in the city.

Large numbers of (mostly Jewish) immigrants later came to Manchester from Central and Eastern Europe. The area, including Broughton, Prestwich and Whitefield today has a Jewish population of about 40,000. This is the largest Jewish community outside London by quite some way. To these groups may be added (in later years) Levantines (involved in the Egyptian cotton trade), Germans and Italians. The German influence can be seen in the city's Halle Orchestra, and the Ancoats area of the city in addition to its large Irish population contained an area known as Little Italy, centring on the parish of St Michaels. By the beginning of the 20th century, Manchester was a very cosmopolitan place and had additionally received immigrants from France, Greece, Armenia, Lithuania, Poland and Ukraine. The opening of the Manchester Ship Canal in 1894 lead to influx of workers from Africa, Asia, Middle East and Scandinavia.

There has been a presence of Black people in Manchester since the 1700s. There are records of black people being buried at Manchester Cathedral from 1757. The abolitionist Thomas Clarkson noted during a speech in Manchester in 1787 "'I was surprised also to find a great crowd of black people standing round the pulpit. There might be forty or fifty of them.'

From the 1940s onwards further waves of immigration brought Cypriots and Hungarians fleeing conflict but in the largest numbers came people re-settling from the British Colonies of the Indian subcontinent, Caribbean and Hong Kong. There has been a Chinese community in the city since the early 20th century. Chinatown, Manchester is said to be the second largest in the United Kingdom and the third largest in Europe.

From the 1990s onwards Kosovans, Afghans, Iraqis and Congolese have settled in the area.

It has been suggested that Manchester, having been involved in all these periods of immigration over the last two hundred years, is the most multilingual of all British cities aside from London.

== Intellectual life ==
The unconventional background of such a diverse population stimulated intellectual and artistic life. The Manchester Academy, for example, opened in Mosley Street in 1786, having enjoyed an earlier incarnation as the Warrington Academy. It was originally run by Presbyterians being one of the few dissenting academies that provided religious nonconformists, who were excluded from the universities of Oxford and Cambridge, with higher education. It taught classics, radical theology, science, modern languages, language and history. In the arts, the Hallé Orchestra, was patronised in its early years, by the German community and attracted a loyal following.

Manchester's rapid growth into a significant industrial centre meant the pace of change was fast and frightening. At that time, it seemed a place in which anything could happen—new industrial processes, new ways of thinking (the so-called 'Manchester School', promoting free trade and laissez-faire), new classes or groups in society, new religious sects and new forms of labour organisation. Such radicalism culminated in the opening of the Free Trade Hall which had several incarnations until its current building was occupied in 1856. It attracted educated visitors from all parts of Britain and Europe. "What Manchester does today," it was said, "the rest of the world does tomorrow." Benjamin Disraeli, at that time a young novelist, had one of his characters express such sentiments. "The age of ruins is past ... Have you seen Manchester? Manchester is as great a human exploit as Athens ...".

== Reform ==
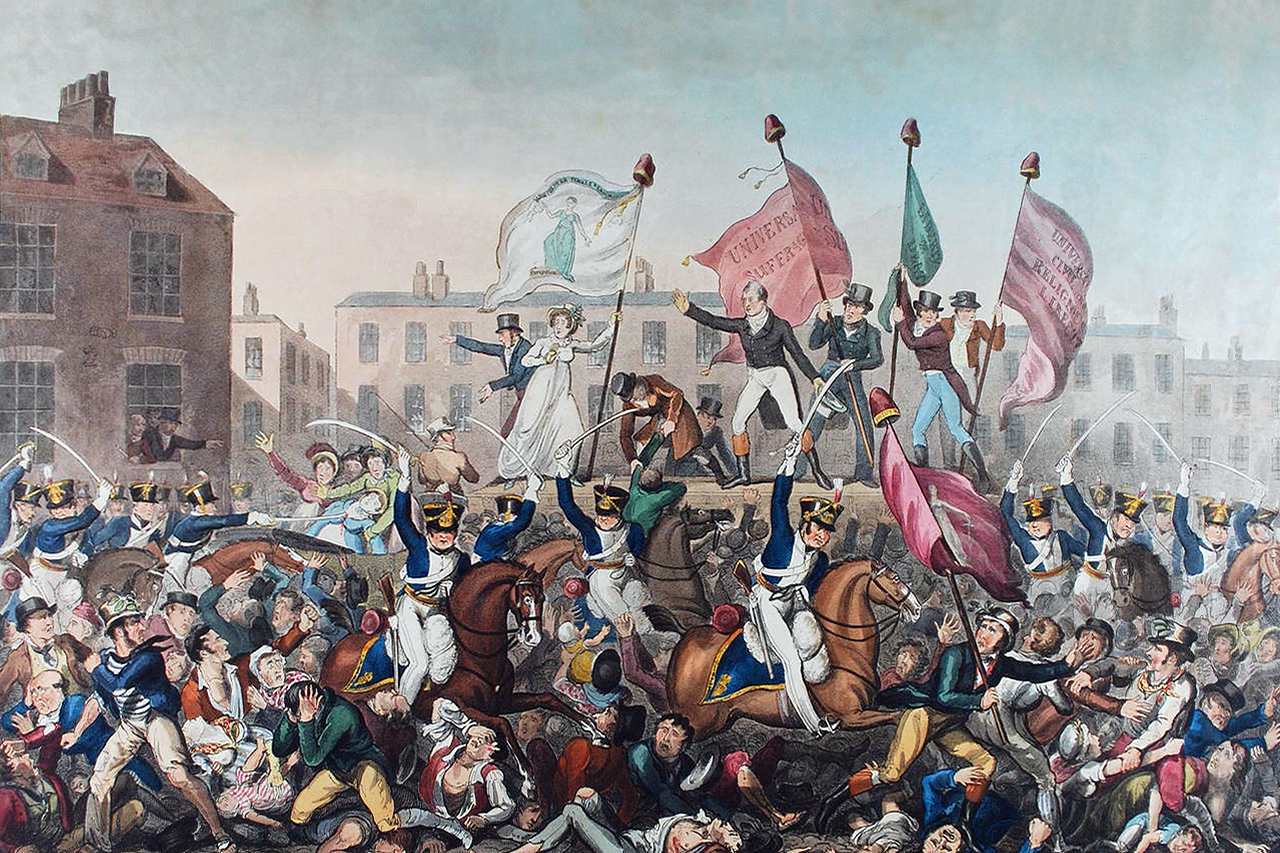
The Peterloo Massacre was a major event in the history of the city.

At the beginning of the 19th century, Manchester was still governed by a court leet on the medieval model, and a boroughreeve was responsible for law and order during the daylight hours. The Manchester and Salford Police Act 1792 (32 Geo. 3. c. 69) created police commissioners, whose job was to provide a night-watch. The commissioners were also given responsibility for road-building, street cleaning, street lighting and the maintenance of fire engines.

The end of the 18th century saw the first serious recession in the textile trade. There were food riots in 1797, and soup kitchens were established in 1799. Manchester was the scene of the Blanketeer agitation in 1817. Popular unrest was paralleled by discontent with Manchester's lack of representation at Westminster, and the town quickly became a centre of radical agitation.

The protest turned to bloodshed in the summer of 1819. A meeting was held in St Peter's Field on 16 August to demonstrate for parliamentary reform. It was addressed by Henry Hunt, a powerful speaker known as Orator Hunt. Local magistrates, fearful of the large crowd estimated at 60,000–80,000, ordered volunteer cavalry from the Manchester and Salford Yeomanry to clear a way through the crowd to arrest Hunt and the platform party. The Yeomanry were armed with sabres and some reports say that many of them were drunk. They lost control and started to strike out at members of the crowd. The magistrates, believing that the Yeomanry were under attack, then ordered the 15th Hussars to disperse the crowd, which they did by charging into the mass of men, women and children, sabres drawn. These events resulted in the deaths of fifteen people and over six hundred injured. The name "Peterloo" was coined immediately by the radical Manchester Observer, combining the name of the meeting place, St Peter's Field, with the Battle of Waterloo fought four years earlier. One of those who later died from his wounds had been present at Waterloo, and told a friend shortly before his death that he had never been in such danger as at Peterloo: "At Waterloo there was man to man but there it was downright murder."

The Manchester Guardian, a newspaper with a radical agenda, was established shortly afterwards. In 1832, following the Great Reform Act, Manchester elected its first MPs since the election of 1656. Five candidates, including William Cobbett, stood and Liberals Charles Poulett Thomson and Mark Philips were elected. The Great Reform Act led to conditions favourable to municipal incorporation. Manchester became a municipal borough in 1838, and what remained of the manorial rights were later purchased by the town council.

== Industrial and cultural growth ==
The prosperity from the textile industry led to an expansion of Manchester and the surrounding conurbation. Many institutions were established including Belle Vue Zoological Gardens (founded by John Jennison in 1836), the Manchester Athenaeum (1836–37), the Corn Exchange (1837) and the Royal Victoria Gallery of Practical Science (1840–42).

This wealth fuelled the development of science and education in Manchester. The Manchester Academy had moved to York in 1803 and, though it returned in 1840, in 1853 it moved again to London, eventually becoming Harris Manchester College, Oxford. However, a Mechanics' Institute, later to become UMIST, was founded in 1824 by among others, John Dalton the "father of atomic theory". In 1851 Owens College was founded by the trustees of John Owens, a textile merchant who had left a bequest for that purpose. Owens College was to become the first constituent college of the Victoria University which was granted its Royal Charter in 1880. This flowering of radicalism and reform took place within the context of ferment in Manchester's cultural and intellectual life. John Dalton lectured on his atomic theory at the Literary and Philosophical Society in 1803. The establishment of the Portico Library in 1806, the Royal Manchester Institution (later the Art Gallery) in 1823, and the Manchester Botanical and Horticultural Society in 1827 are evidence of this.

The growth of city government continued with Manchester finally being incorporated as a borough in 1838, covering the township of Manchester (the area which is now the city centre), along with Ardwick, Beswick, Cheetham, Chorlton-on-Medlock and Hulme.

In 1841, Robert Angus Smith took up work as an analytical chemist at the Royal Manchester Institution and started to research the unprecedented environmental problems. Smith went on to become the first director of the Alkali Inspectorate and to characterise, and coin the term, acid rain.

Manchester continued to be a nexus of political radicalism. From 1842 to 1844, the German social philosopher Friedrich Engels lived there and wrote his influential book Condition of the Working Class in England (1845). He habitually met Karl Marx in an alcove at Chetham's Library.

In 1846 the Borough bought the manorial rights from Sir Oswald Mosley and the granting of city status followed in 1853.

In 1847 the Manchester diocese of the Church of England was established.

In 1851, the Borough became the first local authority to seek water supplies beyond its boundaries.

By 1853, the number of cotton mills in Manchester had reached its peak of 108. Warehouses became commonplace in what now makes up the city centre. These 19th-century Mancunian warehouses were often decorative and ornate for a building of such simple function. The most notable 19th-century warehouse is Watts Warehouse on Portland Street.

The Cooperative Wholesale Society was formed in 1863. Manchester is now home to the Co-operative Group, the largest mutual business in the world with over six million members. The group remained based on their listed estate in Manchester city centre.

The outbreak of the American Civil War in 1861 saw an immediate shortage of cotton and the ensuing cotton famine brought enormous distress to the area until the war ended in 1865.

The first Trades Union Congress was held in Manchester (at the Mechanics' Institute, David Street), from 2 to 6 June 1868. Manchester was the subject of Friedrich Engels' The Condition of the Working Class in England in 1844, Engels himself spending much of his life in and around Manchester. Manchester was also an important cradle of the Labour Party and the Suffragette Movement.

Manchester's golden age was perhaps the last quarter of the 19th century. Many of the great public buildings (including the town hall) date from then. The city's cosmopolitan atmosphere contributed to a vibrant culture, which included the Hallé Orchestra. In 1889, when county councils were created in England, the municipal borough became a county borough with even greater autonomy.

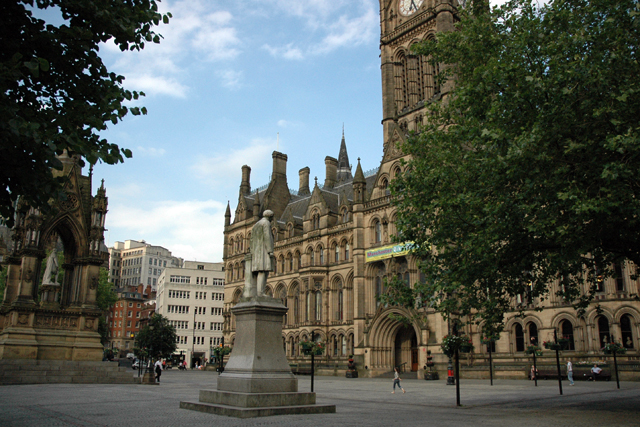
Albert Square

During the late 19th century, Manchester began to suffer an economic decline, partly exacerbated by its reliance on the Port of Liverpool, which was charging excessive dock usage fees. Championed by local industrialist Daniel Adamson, the Manchester Ship Canal was built as a way to reverse this. It gave the city direct access to the sea allowing it to export its manufactured goods directly. This meant that it no longer had to rely on the railways and Liverpool's ports. When completed in 1894 it allowed Manchester to become Britain's third busiest port, despite being 40 miles (64 km) inland. The Manchester Ship Canal was created by canalising the Rivers Irwell and Mersey for 36 miles (58 km) from Salford to the Mersey estuary at the port of Liverpool. This enabled oceangoing ships to sail right into the Port of Manchester (actually in Salford). The docks functioned until the 1970s when their closure led to a large increase in unemployment in the area.

=== The world's first industrial estate ===
Trafford Park in Stretford (outside the city boundaries) was the world's first industrial estate and still exists today, though with a significant tourist and recreational presence. Manchester suffered greatly from the inter-war depression and the underlying structural changes that began to supplant the old industries, including textile manufacture.

== Further expansion ==
The municipal borough created in 1838 covered the six townships of Ardwick, Beswick, Cheetham, Chorlton-on-Medlock, Hulme and Manchester. The borough became a city in 1853. Expansion of the city limits was constrained westwards, as Salford immediately to the west had been given its own borough charter in 1844. These areas were included in the city limits of Manchester at these dates:-

- 1885: Harpurhey, Bradford-with-Beswick, Rusholme
- 1890: Crumpsall, Blackley and Moston, Newton Heath, Clayton, Openshaw, West Gorton
- 1903: Heaton Park. So far most expansion had been northerly and easterly.
- 1904: Moss Side, Chorlton-cum-Hardy, Withington, Burnage, Didsbury, all to the south.
- 1909: Gorton, Levenshulme.
- 1931: The parishes of Northenden, Baguley and Northen Etchells, beyond the River Mersey, previously in Bucklow Rural District in Cheshire. They later formed the Wythenshawe housing estate. This followed an unsuccessful attempt to annex the same area in 1927.
- 1974 (Local Government Act 1972): Ringway, Manchester International Airport.

== 20th century ==
By 1900, the Manchester city region was the 9th most populous in the world. In the early 20th century, Manchester's economy diversified into engineering chemical and electrical industries. The stimulus of the ship canal saw the establishment of Trafford Park, the world's first industrial park, in 1910 and the arrival of the Ford Motor Company and Westinghouse Electric Corporation from the USA. The influence is still visible in "Westinghouse Road" and a grid layout of numbered streets and avenues.

Henry Price (1867–1944) was appointed as the first City Architect of Manchester in 1902. He was succeeded in 1932 by George Noel Hill (1893–1985).

In 1931, the population of Manchester reached an all-time peak of 766,311. However, the period from the 1930s onwards saw a continuous decline in population. During this period, textile manufacture, Manchester's traditional staple industry went into steep decline, largely due to the Great Depression of the 1930s and foreign competition. During this period the Women's Citizens League campaigned for better maternity facilities in the city.

Significant changes in this period were the move of the Manchester Royal Infirmary from Piccadilly in 1908 and the building of a new public library and town hall extension in the 1930s.

=== Second World War ===
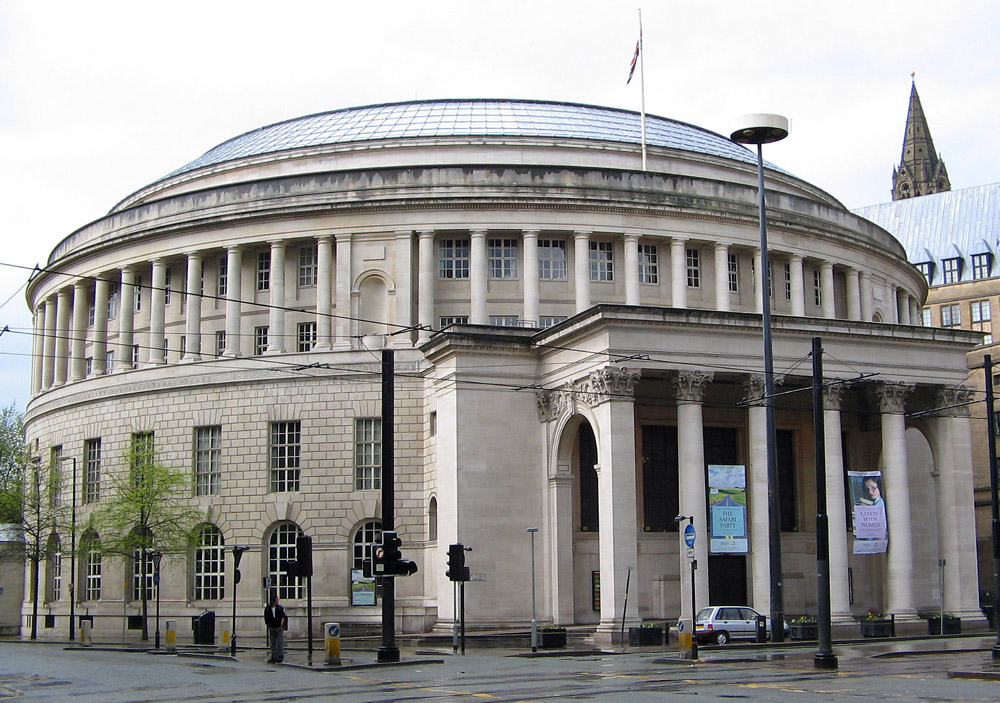
Manchester Central Library, St Peter's Square

In the Second World War Manchester played a key role as an industrial manufacturing city, including the Avro aircraft factory (now BAE Systems) which built countless aircraft for the RAF, the most famous being the Avro Lancaster bomber. As a consequence of its war efforts, the city suffered heavily from bombing during the Blitz in 1940 to 1941. It was attacked a number of times by the Luftwaffe, particularly in the "Christmas Blitz" of December 1940, which destroyed a large part of the historic city centre and seriously damaged the cathedral, which took 20 years to restore. In total, 589 civilians are recorded to have died as result of enemy action within the Manchester County Borough.

=== Post-war ===
The Royal Exchange ceased trading in 1968.

The 1950s saw the start of Manchester's rise as a football superpower. Despite the Munich air disaster, Manchester United F.C. went on to become one of the world's most famous clubs, rising to a dominance of the English game from the early 1990s onwards.

Mancunian Films had been established by John E. Blakeley in the 1930s as a vehicle for northern comedians such as George Formby and Frank Randle. The company opened its own studios, Dickenson Road Studios, in Manchester in 1947 and produced a successful sequence of films until Blakeley's retirement six years later. The studio was sold to the BBC in 1954, the same year that saw the advent of commercial television in the UK. The establishment of Granada Television based in the city attracted much of the production talent from the studios and continued Manchester's tradition of cultural innovation, often with its trademark social radicalism in its programming.

The same period saw the rise to national celebrity of local stars from the Granada TV soap opera Coronation Street, which was first aired on ITV in December 1960 and remains on air more than 60 years later.

The city also attracted international media and public attention for the success of its two senior football clubs—Manchester United and Manchester City.

Manchester United had won two league titles and a FA Cup in the first two decades of the 20th century, but the inter-war years had been blighted by a loss of form on the pitch and ongoing financial problems. The club's revival occurred with the appointment of Matt Busby as manager in 1945; he guided the club to an FA Cup triumph in 1948 and a league title in 1952. He then built a highly successful new side consisting of mostly young players (nicknamed the Busby Babes by the media) which went on to win two league titles and became the first English club to play in the new European Cup. Then tragedy struck in February 1958; eight of the club's players (three of them established England internationals; Roger Byrne, Tommy Taylor and Duncan Edwards) died as a result of the Munich air disaster on the return flight from a European Cup tie in Yugoslavia and two others injured to such an extent that they never played again. Busby, who was seriously injured in the crash, was left to build a new team. His new United side, built around Munich crash survivors including Bill Foulkes and Bobby Charlton, went on to dominate the English game in the 1960s, featuring new stars like Denis Law and George Best, winning two more league titles, a FA Cup and then the European Cup in 1968—the first English club to win the trophy. Busby retired the following year after 24 years in charge. The club was less successful in the 1970s, its only major trophy of the decade being the FA Cup in 1977, and the club even spent a season outside the top division of English football. The 1980s were slightly more successful with a further two FA Cups wins and regular top four league finishes, but the club has enjoyed an unmatched run of success which began after the appointment of Alex Ferguson as manager in 1986. By the time Ferguson retired in 2013 after 27 years as manager, the club had won a further 13 league titles, five FA Cups, four League Cups and two European Cups. High-profile players to have played for the club during Sir Alex Ferguson's management (he was knighted in 1999) include Bryan Robson, Mark Hughes, Ryan Giggs, Eric Cantona, David Beckham and Wayne Rooney.

Manchester City entered the Football League in 1899, and won their first major honour with the FA Cup in 1904. Manchester City had been league champions once and FA Cup winners twice by 1939, but enjoyed further success in the post-war years, starting with an FA Cup win in 1956. The club's next success came more than a decade later, with a league championship triumph in 1968, an FA Cup triumph in 1969, and a double of the European Cup Winners' Cup and Football League Cup in 1970 under the management of Joe Mercer and Malcolm Allison. Great players of the 1950s and 1960s sides included Don Revie, Bert Trautmann, Francis Lee, Colin Bell and Tony Book. They won the League Cup in 1976 but after losing the 1981 FA Cup Final, the club went through a period of decline, which eventually saw them relegated as far down as third tier of English football by the end of the 1997–98 season.

They since regained promotion to the top tier in 2001–02 and have remained a fixture in the Premier League since 2002–03. For 80 years until 2003, the club had played at the Maine Road stadium in the Moss Side area of the city, before moving to the City of Manchester Stadium to the east of the city centre, which had been constructed for the previous year's Commonwealth Games. In 2008, Manchester City was purchased by Abu Dhabi United Group for £210 million and received considerable financial investment. The club's next major trophy was the FA Cup in 2011. The club's first top division league title for 44 years followed in 2012, and a League Cup triumph followed in 2014.

The club have now won seven domestic league titles. Under the management of Pep Guardiola they won the Premier League in 2018 becoming the only Premier League team to attain 100 points in a single season. In 2019, they won four trophies, completing an unprecedented sweep of all domestic trophies in England and becoming the first English men's team to win the domestic treble. Manchester City's revenue was the fifth highest of a football club in the world in the 2017–18 season at €527.7 million. In 2018, Forbes estimated the club was the fifth most valuable in the world at $2.47 billion.

As with many British cities during the period. The 1950s and 1960s saw extensive re-development of the city, with old and overcrowded housing cleared to make way for high-rise blocks of flats. This changed the appearance of Manchester considerably, although the high-rise experiment later proved unpopular and unsuccessful. The city centre also saw major redevelopment, with developments such as the Manchester Arndale.

Manchester's key role in the industrial revolution was repeated and the city became a centre of research and development. Manchester made important contributions to the computer revolution. The father of modern computing Alan Turing was based at Manchester University and it was his idea of the stored-program concept that led in 1948 to the Manchester Baby, which was the first electronic stored-program computer to run a programme. This was developed by Frederic C. Williams and Tom Kilburn at the University of Manchester. This was followed by the Manchester Mark 1, in 1949. These inventions were commercialised in the Ferranti Mark 1, one of the first commercially available computers.

In the late 1950s, Manchester was chosen as a testing ground for a new telephone service which formed the foundations of what we now know of as mobile phone technology. The "Post Office South Lancashire Radiophone Service" was controlled from the city's Peterloo telephone exchange and enabled customers with the apparatus installed in their vehicle to phone to any UK subscriber.

In 1974, Manchester was split from the county of Lancashire, and the Metropolitan Borough of Manchester was created.

The diversification of the city's economy helped to cushion the blow of this decline. However, as with many inner-city areas, the growth of car ownership and commuting meant that many people moved from the inner-city and into surrounding suburbs. By 1971 the population of Manchester had declined to 543,868, and by 2001 422,302.

=== IRA bomb and its effects ===
The devastation left by the IRA bombing

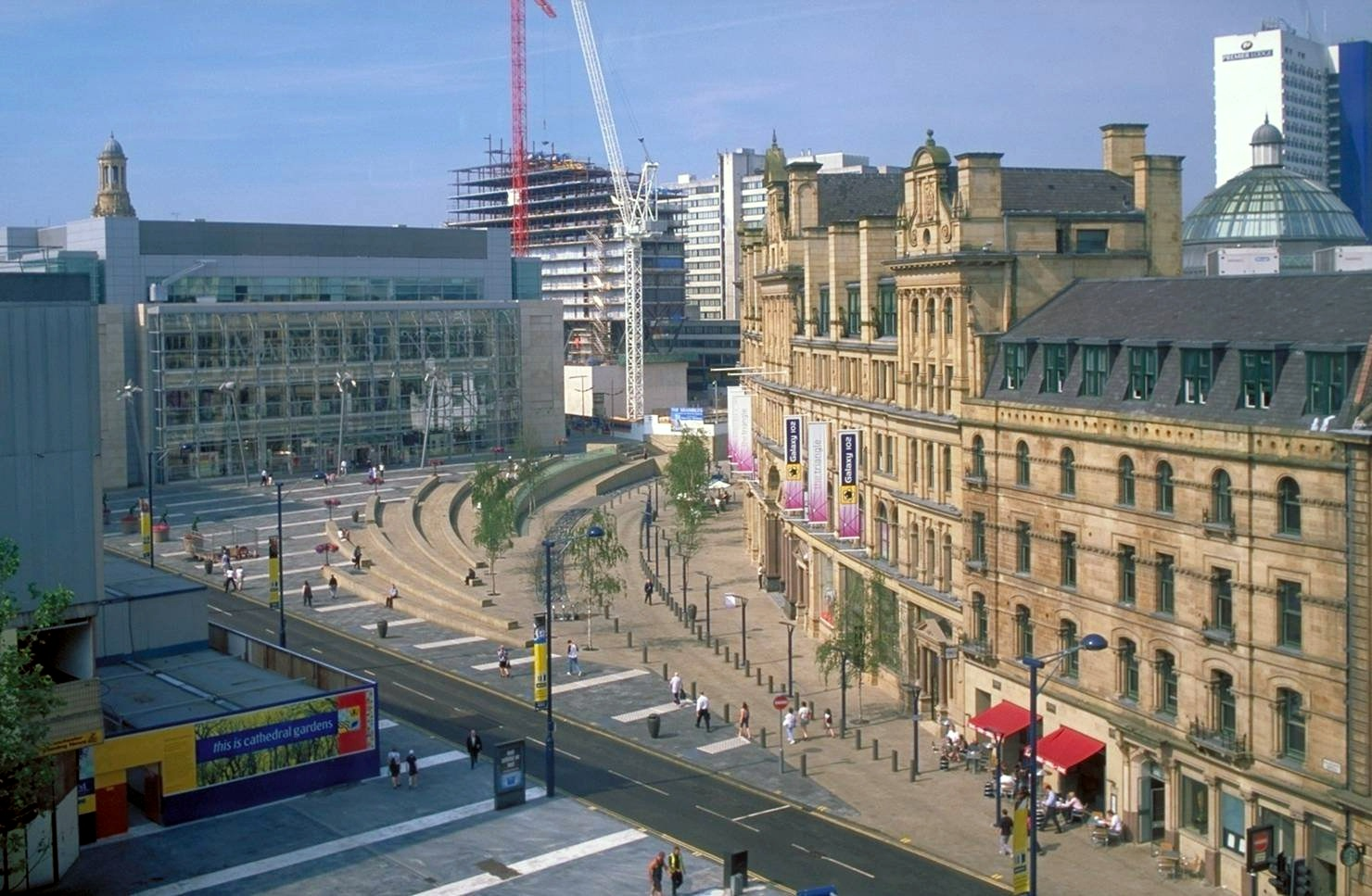
Manchester's Exchange Square undergoing extensive regeneration

During the 1980s, with the demise of many traditional industries under the radical economic restructuring often known as Thatcherism, the city and region experienced some decline. The revival started towards the end of the decade, catalysed, not only by wider growing prosperity in the UK but by the creative music industry. New institutions such as Factory Records and Fac 51 Hacienda earned the city the sobriquet Madchester.

At 11.20 am on Saturday 15 June 1996, the IRA detonated a large bomb in the city centre, the largest to be detonated on British soil. Fortunately, warnings given in the previous hour had allowed the evacuation of the immediate area, so this bomb caused over 200 injuries but no deaths. The principal damage was to the physical infrastructure of nearby buildings. Since then the city centre has undergone extensive rejuvenation alongside the more general efforts to regenerate previously run-down areas of the wider city (such as Hulme and Salford). This reconstruction spurred a massive regeneration of the city centre, with complexes such as the Printworks and the Triangle creating new city focal points for both shopping and entertainment. The following regeneration took over a decade to complete. The completion of the renovated Manchester Arndale in September 2006 allowed the centre to hold the title of the UK's largest city centre shopping mall. The bomb is commemorated by a plaque fixed to a nearby postbox which withstood the blast, which reads "This postbox remained standing almost undamaged on June 15, 1996 when this area was devastated by a bomb. The box was removed during the rebuilding of the city centre and was returned to its original site on November 22nd 1999."

Manchester has a history of attacks attributed to Irish Republicans; in 1867, a group called the Manchester Martyrs were hanged following their conviction of murder after an attack on a police van in which a police officer was accidentally shot dead. The perpetrators were linked with the Irish Fenian groups that wished to free Ireland from British rule. Other instances before the 1996 attack include arson in 1920, a series of explosions in 1939, and two bombs in 1992.

== 21st century ==
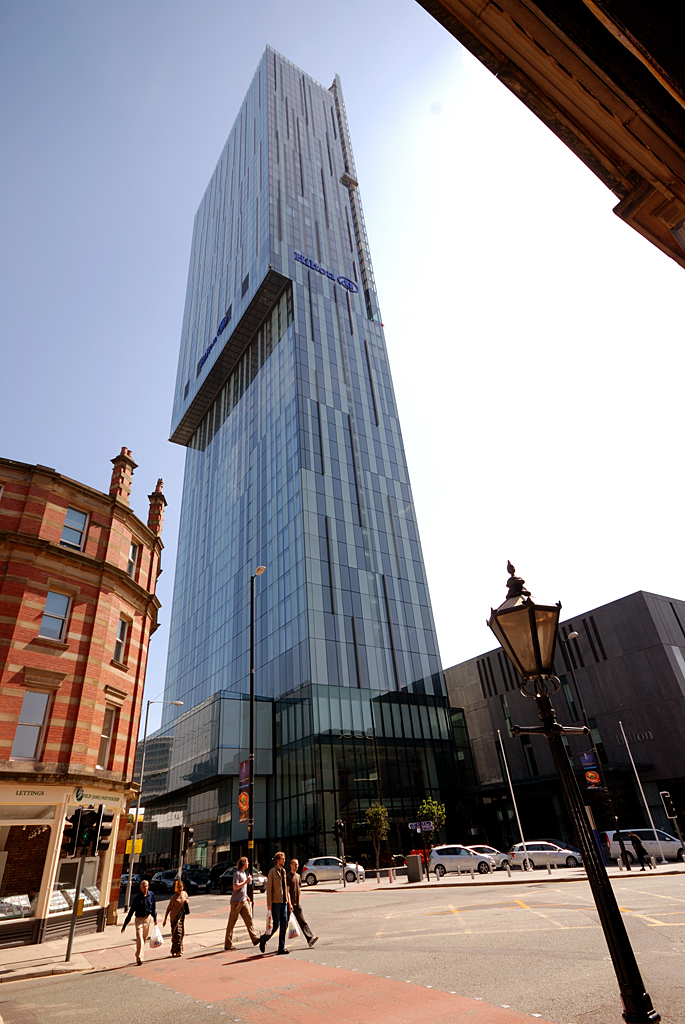
Beetham Tower, Manchester's second tallest building, was completed in 2006.

In 2002, the city hosted the XVII Commonwealth Games very successfully, earning praise from many previously sceptical sources. Manchester has twice failed in its bid to host the Olympic Games, losing to Atlanta in 1996 and Sydney in 2000.

In the 1990s, Manchester earned a reputation for gang-related crime, particularly after a spate of shootings involving young men, and reports of teenagers carrying handguns as "fashion accessories". A more concerted effort to reduce such crime has focused on prohibiting the availability of firearms, working with the community, deterring young individuals from joining gangs and jailing ringleaders have all helped to reduce gun crime. Consequently, gun crime has plummeted year on year since 2007. Crime figures from 2011 show there were 19.2 firearm crimes per 100,000 population in Greater Manchester—compared to 35.1 in the Metropolitan Police area and City of London, and 34.3 in the West Midlands.

The Canal Street area of the city is well known as the "Gay Village". Manchester's claim to the status of "gay capital of the UK" was strengthened in 2003 when it played host city to the annual Europride festival.

During the 1980s, the Victoria University of Manchester had somewhat complacently exploited its reputation as one of the leading red brick universities. During the same period, many of those universities established post-war vigorously pursued policies of growth and innovation. The university consequently saw its standing decline and only in the 1990s did it embark on a catch-up programme. In October 2004 the Victoria University of Manchester and UMIST merged to form the University of Manchester, the largest University in the UK with ambitious plans to be one of the world's leading research-intensive universities.

Since the regeneration after the 1996 IRA bomb, and aided by the XVII Commonwealth Games, Manchester's city centre has changed significantly. Large sections of the city dating from the 1960s have been either demolished and re-developed or modernised with the use of glass and steel; a good example of this transformation is the Manchester Arndale. Many old mills and textile warehouses have been converted into apartments, helping to give the city a much more modern, upmarket look and feel. Some areas, like Hulme (first unsuccessfully regenerated in the 1960s when multi-storey flats replaced Victorian slums), have undergone extensive regeneration programmes and many million-pound lofthouse apartments have since been developed to cater for its growing business community. The 168 metre tall, 47-storey Beetham Tower, completed in 2006, provides the highest residential accommodation in the United Kingdom — the lower 23 floors form the Hilton Hotel, while the upper 24 floors are apartments. The Beetham Tower was originally planned to stand 171 metres in height, but this had to be changed due to local wind conditions.

In January 2007, the independent Casino Advisory Panel awarded Manchester a licence to build the only supercasino in the UK to regenerate the Eastlands area of the city, but in March the House of Lords rejected the decision by three votes rendering previous House of Commons acceptance meaningless. This left the supercasino, and 14 other smaller concessions, in parliamentary limbo until a final decision was made. On 11 July 2007, a source close to the government declared the entire supercasino project "dead in the water". A member of the Manchester Chamber of Commerce professed himself "amazed and a bit shocked" and that "there has been an awful lot of time and money wasted". After a meeting with the Prime Minister, Manchester City Council issued a press release on 24 July 2007 stating that "contrary to some reports the door is not closed to a regional casino". The supercasino was officially declared dead in February 2008 with a compensation package described by the Manchester Evening News as "rehashed plans, spin and empty promises".

Parts of the city centre were affected by rioting by Rangers fans during the 2008 UEFA Cup final riots.

By 2011, Manchester and Salford were on a tentative list for UNESCO World Heritage Site status. The proposal centres on the Bridgewater Canal, regarded as the first true canal which helped create the industrial revolution.

On Tuesday 9 August, the centres of Manchester and Salford were among the many cities and towns affected by the 2011 England riots.

On 22 May 2017, the city suffered its worst postwar tragedy when an Islamic extremist, Libyan immigrant Salaman Abedi, carried out a suicide bombing following a concert by the American singer Ariana Grande at the Manchester Arena. Abedi killed himself and 22 other people, and injured over 800, with many of the casualties being children, teenagers and young adults. It was the deadliest terrorist attack and the first suicide bombing in Britain since the 7 July 2005 London bombings. The attack caused worldwide condemnation and the changing of the UK's threat level to "critical" for the first time since 2007. Many of the injured and dead were from the Greater Manchester area and neighbouring parts of Cheshire and Lancashire.

On 2 October 2025 an antisemitic terrorist attack occurred outside the Heaton Park Hebrew Congregation in Manchester during Yom Kippur. Jihad al-Shamie, 35, rammed his car into pedestrians and stabbed worshippers before police shot him dead, killing two people and seriously injuring three.

== Civic history ==
The town of Manchester (as it was then) was granted a charter in 1301 by Thomas de Grelley, Baron of Manchester, who was also the Lord of the manor of Manchester, but the borough status it conferred on the town was lost following a court case in 1359.

Until the 19th century, Manchester was one of the many townships in the ancient parish of Manchester which covered a wider area than today's metropolitan borough.

In 1792 commissioners, usually known as police commissioners, were established for the improvement of the Township of Manchester.

The Municipal Corporations Act 1835 converted many older boroughs into a new standardised type of borough called municipal boroughs, with elected councils, and included provisions to allow other towns to become municipal boroughs. Manchester took advantage of the new provisions and secured a charter incorporating the town as a municipal borough on 23 October 1838. The borough as created in 1838 covered the six townships of Ardwick, Beswick, Cheetham, Chorlton-on-Medlock, Hulme and Manchester. The municipal borough was slightly smaller than the parliamentary constituency of Manchester which had been created under the Reform Act 1832, which also included Bradford, Harpurhey and Newton. The first election to the borough council (also called the corporation) was held on 14 December 1838. The council held its first meeting on 15 December 1838 at the Manor Court Room on Brown Street, when Thomas Potter was appointed the first Mayor of Manchester and Joseph Heron was appointed the first town clerk, a post he would hold for over forty years.

On 11 December 1840, the Manchester Poor Law Union was formally declared and took responsibility for the administration and funding of the Poor Law in the area.

=== City of Manchester ===
On 29 March 1853, the borough was elevated to city status. In 1885 further areas were added to the City of Manchester with Bradford, Harpurhey, Rusholme and parts of Moss Side and Withington townships.

By the Local Government Act 1888, the City of Manchester became in 1889 a county borough, although it still kept the city title.

Other areas, which had been under the control of Lancashire County Council, were added to the city between 1890 and 1933:

- 1890: Blackley, Crumpsall, Moston, Openshaw and Newton (incl. Kirkmanshulme) townships, Clayton area (part of Droylsden township) and part of Gorton township.
- 1901: A very small part of Gorton Urban District.
- 1903: Part (Heaton Park area) of Prestwich Urban District.
- 1904: Burnage, Didsbury and Chorlton-cum-Hardy civil parishes and Moss Side and Withington Urban Districts.
- 1909: Levenshulme Urban District and the remaining area of Gorton Urban District.
- 1913: Part of Heaton Norris Urban District.
- 1933: Part of Denton Urban District.
- In addition to these areas, in 1931 the Cheshire civil parishes of Baguley, Northenden, and Northen Etchells were also added to the City of Manchester.

Under the Local Government Act 1972, the City of Manchester, with the addition of the civil parish of Ringway, became on 1 April 1974 one of the ten Metropolitan Boroughs of the newly created Metropolitan county of Greater Manchester.

In 1986 Greater Manchester County Council was abolished by the Local Government Act 1985 and most of its functions were devolved to the ten boroughs, making them effectively unitary authorities. Some of the County Council's functions were taken over by joint bodies such as a passenger transport authority, and joint fire, police, and waste disposal authorities.

In one of its most noted acts, Manchester City Council carried a resolution in 1980 to create the UK's first Nuclear Free Zone The Peace Gardens were later constructed on a small piece of land in Lincoln Square.

== Greater Manchester ==
Before 1974 the area of Greater Manchester was split between Cheshire and Lancashire with numerous parts being independent county boroughs. The area was informally known as "SELNEC", for "South East Lancashire North East Cheshire". Also, small parts of the West Riding of Yorkshire (around Saddleworth) and Derbyshire were covered.

SELNEC had been proposed by the Redcliffe-Maud Report of 1969 as a "metropolitan area". This had roughly the same northern boundary as today's Greater Manchester but covered much more territory in north-east Cheshire – including Macclesfield and Warrington. It also covered Glossop in Derbyshire.

In 1969 a SELNEC Passenger Transport Authority was set up, which covered an area smaller than the proposed SELNEC, but different from the eventual Greater Manchester.

Although the Redcliffe-Maud report was rejected by the Conservative Party government after it won the 1970 general election, it was committed to local government reform and accepted the need for a county based on Manchester. Its original proposal was much smaller than the Redcliffe-Maud Report's SELNEC, but further fringe areas such as Wilmslow, Warrington and Glossop were trimmed from the edges and included instead in the shire counties. The metropolitan county of Greater Manchester was eventually established in 1974.

Greater Manchester's representative county council was abolished in 1986, following the Local Government Act 1985. However, Greater Manchester is still a metropolitan county and ceremonial county.

== See also ==
- Beyer, Peacock & Company
- History of England
- List of famous Mancunians
- List of railway stations in Greater Manchester
- Manchester Metropolitan University
- Politics in Manchester
- Stephenson's Rocket
- Timeline of Manchester history
- Transport in Manchester
- University of Manchester
- University of Manchester Institute of Science and Technology
- Victoria University of Manchester
