= Politics in Manchester =

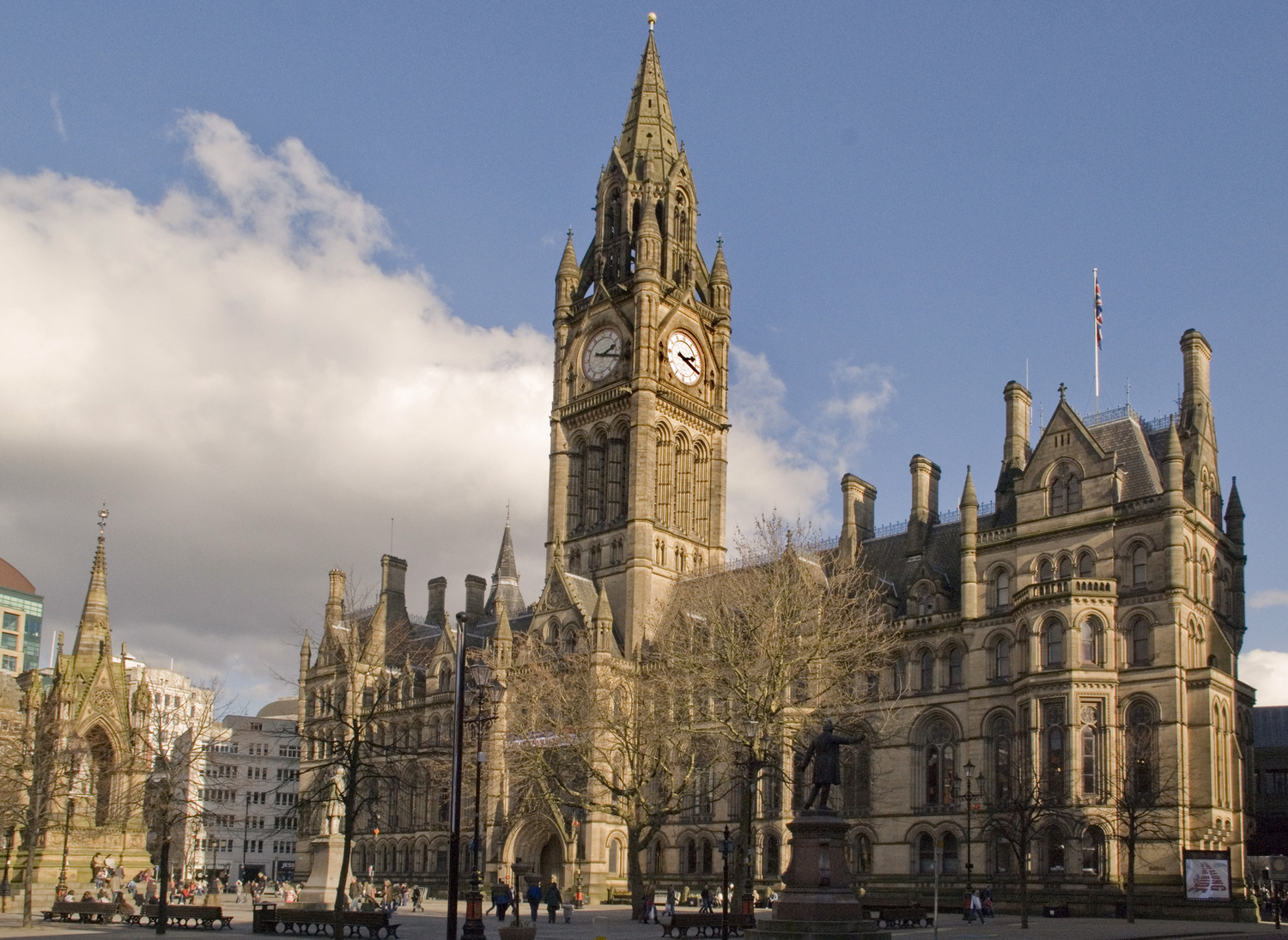
Manchester Town Hall is an example of the Victorian architecture found in Manchester and is the home of Manchester City Council.

The City of Manchester forms part of the metropolitan county of Greater Manchester, which had its county council abolished (along with the other metropolitan counties) in 1986. Manchester consists of several districts, but these districts do not represent a tier of government (though the names are used as political wards).

== Political history ==
Manchester has long been associated with radical politics, including the Peterloo Massacre in 1819; the formation of the Anti-Corn Law League in 1839, as well as being the birthplace to some of the most influential works of Karl Marx and Friedrich Engels.

Manchester currently sits on the left of the political spectrum, as shown by the make up of its City Council. The north of the city is considered a Labour stronghold, while the southern suburbs tend to be more hospitable to other parties. The last Conservative MP lost his seat in 1987. In the 2026 Gorton and Denton by-election, Hannah Spencer became the first Green Party MP in Manchester.

== Manchester City Council ==
Manchester City Council is the local authority for the metropolitan borough of Manchester. The borough is divided into 32 wards, which elect a total of 96 councillors, three for each ward. Currently, the council is controlled by the Labour Party and is led by Garry Bridges. The main opposition is formed by the Green Party and is led by Astrid Johnson.

Party	Seats
Party	7 May 2026
Labour	64
Green	21
Reform	7
Liberal Democrats	4

=== Districts in the City of Manchester ===
- Ancoats
- Ardwick
- Baguley
- Benchill
- Beswick
- Blackley
- Bradford
- Burnage
- Brooklands
- Cheetham
- Chorlton-cum-Hardy
- Clayton
- Crumpsall
- Didsbury
- Fallowfield
- Gaythorn
- Gorton
- Harpurhey
- Hulme
- Levenshulme
- Longsight
- Miles Platting
- Moss Side
- Moston
- Newton Heath
- Northenden
- Openshaw
- Rusholme
- Sharston
- Whalley Range
- Withington
- Woodhouse Park
- Wythenshawe

=== Parishes ===
There is only one civil parish in the metropolitan borough, Ringway, which was added in 1974. The entire area of the pre-1974 county borough is an unparished area.

=== North West Regional Assembly ===
Whilst not a directly elected body, the North West Regional Assembly was responsible for promoting the economic, environmental, and social well-being of the North West England region. It was made up of representatives from councils across the region, business organizations, public sector agencies, education and training bodies, trade unions and co-operatives and the voluntary and community sector. Regional assemblies were abolished in 2010.

== UK Parliament ==
There are six UK Parliamentary constituencies that cover the City of Manchester, each of which elects one Member of Parliament (MP) to the House of Commons in London. These constituencies and their current MPs are:

- Manchester Central (also covers part of Oldham) – Lucy Powell MP (Labour)
- Blackley and Middleton South (also covers part of Rochdale) – Graham Stringer MP (Labour)
- Gorton and Denton (also covers part of Tameside) – Hannah Spencer MP (Green)
- Manchester Rusholme– Afzal Khan MP (Labour)
- Manchester Withington – Jeff Smith MP (Labour)
- Wythenshawe and Sale East (also covers part of Trafford) – Mike Kane MP (Labour)

== European Parliament ==
North West England, as a single EU constituency, elected 8 representatives to the European Parliament. At the time of Britain's withdrawal from the European Union the Members of the European Parliament (MEPs) for the North West were:

Constituency	Member of the European Parliament	National political party	European political party	European Parliament group	Year first elected	Website	Parliamentary profile
North West England	Jane Brophy	Liberal Democrats	Alliance of Liberals and Democrats for Europe Party	Renew Europe	2019	Website	Profile
North West England	David Bull	Brexit Party	None	Non-Inscrits	2019	Website	Profile
North West England	Chris Davies	Liberal Democrats	Alliance of Liberals and Democrats for Europe Party	Renew Europe	1999		Profile
North West England	Gina Dowding	Green Party of England and Wales	European Green Party	The Greens - European Free Alliance	2019		Profile
North West England	Claire Fox	Brexit Party	None	Non-Inscrits	2019		Profile
North West England	Theresa Griffin	Labour Party	Party of European Socialists	Progressive Alliance of Socialists and Democrats	2014	Website	Profile
North West England	Henrik Overgaard-Nielsen	Brexit Party	None	Non-Inscrits	2019		Profile
North West England	Julie Ward	Labour Party	Party of European Socialists	Progressive Alliance of Socialists and Democrats	2014	Website	Profile

Notes

1. 1: Defeated in 2014, re-elected in 2019.

== Greater Manchester ==
Greater Manchester is a metropolitan county which surrounds the City of Manchester. Including the City of Manchester, Greater Manchester is made up of ten metropolitan boroughs, with each borough having its own council. The ten boroughs are shown in the following map.

Number	Borough	Map	Number	Borough
1	City of Manchester		6	Metropolitan Borough of Bury
2	Metropolitan Borough of Stockport		7	Metropolitan Borough of Bolton
3	Metropolitan Borough of Tameside		8	Metropolitan Borough of Wigan
4	Metropolitan Borough of Oldham		9	City of Salford
5	Metropolitan Borough of Rochdale		10	Metropolitan Borough of Trafford

The larger towns in the Greater Manchester county include Altrincham, Ashton-under-Lyne, Bolton, Bury, Cheadle, Droylsden, Hyde, Middleton, Oldham, Rochdale, Sale, Stalybridge, Stockport, Stretford and Wigan.

Since 2017, there has been an elected Mayor of Greater Manchester, who sits on the Greater Manchester Combined Authority and has power over areas including planning, housing, transport, policing, waste management and skills.

List of Mayors

Colour key
(for political parties)
Labour

Mayors of Greater Manchester
Name	Portrait	Term of office		Elected	Political party	Previous and concurrent occupations
Tony Lloyd; Interim Mayor		29 May 2015	8 May 2017	—N/a	Labour	MP for Stretford (1983–1997); MP for Manchester Central (1997–2012); Greater Manchester Police and Crime Commissioner (2012–2017)
Andy Burnham		8 May 2017	Incumbent	2017; 2021; 2024	Labour and Co-operative	MP for Leigh (2001–2017); Chief Secretary to the Treasury (2007–2008); Secretary of State for Culture, Media and Sport (2008–2009); Secretary of State for Health (2009–2010)

=== County-wide functions ===
Greater Manchester County Council was the top-tier local government body from 1974 to its abolition in 1986. The county still arranges some amenities and services on a county-wide basis. Greater Manchester Police and Greater Manchester Fire and Rescue Service offer law enforcement and fire protection, while public transport is the responsibility of Transport for Greater Manchester (TfGM). These are overseen by the Greater Manchester Combined Authority, established in 2011.

== Law enforcement ==
The City of Manchester is policed by the Greater Manchester Police, who have their headquarters at Chester House in Trafford. The main police station in central Manchester is at Bootle Street, near to Albert Square. There are other stations in Salford, Hulme, Collyhurst, Withington, Chorlton-cum-Hardy, and Longsight. Manchester's railways are policed by the nationwide British Transport Police.

Manchester had its own police force until 1974, when its force and the lower divisions of Lancashire Constabulary merged to form the Greater Manchester Police. Each of the ten metropolitan boroughs of Greater Manchester has a Division within the county force.
