= Javeno McLean =

British fitness coach, TV presenter and author

- Born: 1985; Jamaica
- Occupations: Fitness coach; social media personality; influencer; powerlifter
- Spouse: Laura McLean
- Children: 2
- Website: j7healthcentre.co.uk

Javeno McLean is a British fitness coach and online content creator, known for personal training with the disabled, sick and elderly.

McLean has over 1.4 million followers on TikTok: one video exceeded 23.4 million views. On Instagram, McLean has more than half a million followers. For more than twenty years, McLean has supported the lonely.

== Early life ==
McLean was born in Jamaica in 1985. He moved to the UK when he was six years old. He was raised in the Blackley and Crumpsall areas of North Manchester. He became a professional cricketer. He sought to help and to encourage others. He began running Manchester City Council-funded community exercise classes. In 2017, he opened the J7 Health Centre. He began to help the disabled after he had seen a boy in a wheelchair struggling in the gym.

== Career ==
McLean was working as a council sports coach when he first met the woman who would help him build up his successful business.

"I had this one class in a school in Miles Platting – it was me and Brenda. For four months it was just me and Brenda – and she loved it. Every session, I trained her like it was her last one."

While working within the Manchester City Council, McLean began exercise classes with his team, Active Lifestyle. He believed that the best way to achieve success was through word of mouth. Brenda, unknowingly, lit the fuse that would spark McLean's long-term success.

"After four months, Brenda told one person how great she thought the session was," he said.

"One person became two... two became four... four became eight... nine... ten... and before I knew it, 20 people were attending my classes".

McLean's impact on the lives of his clients is evident as he trains up to 17 disabled individuals in a single day.

J7 Health Centre won the Corporate Livewire Prestige Awards 'Community Gym of the Year', beating 21 other Manchester gyms in the same category.

== Personal life ==
McLean was a temporary cricket conditioner for two months. Shortly after, he suffered a serious Achilles tendon injury which encouraged his decision to leave the sport for good. He was named the 1 Million Minutes Local Loneliness Champion on Good Morning Britain.
