= Manchester (ancient parish) =

- Status: Ecclesiastical parish
  - HQ: St Mary's, Christ Church
- Subdivisions
  - Type: Townships

Manchester was an ancient ecclesiastical parish of the Salford Hundred, in Lancashire, England. It encompassed several townships and chapelries, including the then township of Manchester (now Manchester city centre). Other townships are now parts of the Anglican Diocese of Manchester and/or Greater Manchester.

In the Domesday Book the parish of Manchester is recorded as including St Michael's Church in Ashton-under-Lyne as well as the mother church of St Mary's in Manchester. Although by the 13th century Ashton had formed its own separate parish, the advowson was held by Manchester as late as 1458.

== Townships ==
In 1866 the townships became recognised as separate civil parishes. Part, but not all, of this area was in the municipal borough of Manchester, which expanded with the decades. In 1896 the parishes of the City of Manchester outside the remaining Manchester parish were re-organised as North Manchester and South Manchester parishes, which were themselves re-organised as a single civil parish of Manchester in 1916, while the parishes in the county borough of Salford were united as a single civil parish in 1919.

- Ardwick (Manchester Borough 1838, South Manchester parish in 1896)
- Beswick (Manchester Borough 1838, North Manchester parish in 1896)
- Blackley (to Manchester Borough in 1890, North Manchester parish in 1896)
- Bradford (to Manchester borough in 1885, North Manchester parish in 1896)
- Broughton (part to Municipal Borough of Salford in 1844, remainder in 1853, part of City of Salford in 1974)
- Burnage (to Withington Local Government District 1876, Withington Urban District 1894, Manchester County Borough in 1904, South Manchester parish in 1910)
- Cheetham (Manchester Borough 1838, North Manchester parish 1896)
- Chorlton-cum-Hardy (to Withington Urban District, Manchester Borough in 1904, South Manchester parish in 1910)
- Chorlton upon Medlock (Manchester Borough 1838, South Manchester parish 1896)
- Crumpsall (formed a Local Board District in 1854, to Manchester Borough in 1890, North Manchester parish in 1896)
- Denton (formed Denton Local Board District in 1857, part of Denton and Haughton Local Government District in 1884, became Denton Urban District in 1894, to Tameside in 1974)
- Didsbury (Included in area of Withington Local Board of Health in 1876, Withington Urban District in 1894, Manchester Borough in 1904, South Manchester parish in 1910)
- Droylsden (In 1863 part of the township became a Local Board District and was subsequently reconstituted as Droylsden Urban District in 1894, passing to Tameside in 1974. The remainder was included in the Borough of Manchester in 1884, becoming the parish of Clayton in 1894, North Manchester parish in 1896)
- Failsworth (Formed a Local board of health in 1863, became Failsworth Urban District in 1894, to Oldham in 1974)
- Gorton (Formed a local board of health in 1863. Part was included in County Borough of Manchester in 1890, became West Gorton parish in 1894, part of South Manchester parish in 1896. Remainder formed Gorton Urban District in 1894, was absorbed by county borough and parish of South Manchester in 1910)
- Harpurhey (Included in Prestwich Rural Sanitary District in 1875, Manchester county borough in 1890, North Manchester parish in 1896)
- Haughton (Haughton Local Board District formed in 1877, part of Denton and Haughton Local Government District in 1884, Denton Urban District in 1894, to Tameside in 1974)
- Heaton Norris (part of the parish was included in the Municipal Borough of Stockport in 1835, the remainder became Heaton Norris Local Board District in 1872, an urban district in 1894, and was included in the County Borough of Stockport in 1913. The parish was merged with that of Stockport in 1935.)
- Hulme (Manchester Borough 1838, South Manchester parish 1896)
- Levenshulme (Levenshulme Local board District 1863–1894, Urban District 1894–1909, then to Manchester County Borough; to South Manchester parish 1910)
- Manchester (Manchester borough 1838)
- Moss Side (the majority of the parish was constituted as Moss Side Local Board District in 1856, and urban district in 1894, included in Manchester County Borough in 1904 and South Manchester parish in 1910; a detached part of the parish was included in Rusholme Local Board District in 1865, and Manchester Borough in 1885.)
- Moston (Included in Prestwich Rural Sanitary District in 1875, to Manchester County Borough in 1890, North Manchester parish in 1896)
- Newton (Formed Newton Heath Local Board District in 1853, detached part (Kirkmanshulme) was separated in 1859, and was included in Prestwich Rural Sanitary district in 1875. Both parts of the parish were added to Manchester Borough in 1890, South Manchester parish in 1896)
- Openshaw (formed Openshaw Local Board district in 1863, to Manchester borough in 1890, South Manchester parish in 1896)
- Reddish (Reddish Local Government District 1881 to 1894, urban district 1894 to 1901, Stockport County Borough 1901, absorbed by Stockport parish in 1935.)
- Rusholme (Local Board District formed 1851, included in Manchester Borough in 1885, South Manchester parish 1896)
- Salford (Included in Municipal Borough of Salford in 1844, County Borough of Salford in 1889, to City of Salford in 1974)
- Stretford (Stretford Local Board District 1868–1894, Urban District 1894–1933, Municipal Borough 1933, to Trafford in 1974)
- Withington (to Withington Local Government District 1876, Withington Urban District 1894, Manchester borough in 1904, South Manchester parish in 1910)

== See also ==
- History of Manchester
