= Hic Dragones =

Book Publishers

- Founded: 2010
- Founder: Hannah Kate
- Country of origin: United Kingdom
- Headquarters location: Manchester
- Publication types: Books
- Official website: www.hic-dragones.co.uk

Hic Dragones is a small press independent publisher based in North Manchester, UK. They publish short story anthologies, novels, and re-serialized penny dreadfuls. Hic Dragones have also held academic conferences on diverse topics such as cannibalism, monsters, true crime, Alice in Wonderland, and The Wizard of Oz.

== Origins ==
Hic Dragones was founded in 2010 by Hannah Kate.

== Authors ==
=== Authors published in full-length book form by Hic Dragones ===
- Toby Stone
- Beth Daley
- Kim Bannerman
- Hannah Kate

== Full List of Titles ==
=== Novels ===
- Aimee and the Bear – Toby Stone
- Blood and Water – Beth Daley
- The Tattooed Wolf – Kim Bannerman
- Psychic Spiders! – Toby Stone

=== Poetry ===
- Variant Spelling – Hannah Kate

=== Anthologies ===
- Wolf-Girls: Dark Tales of Teeth, Claws and Lycogyny – ed. Hannah Kate
- Impossible Spaces – ed. Hannah Kate
- Hauntings: An Anthology – ed. Hannah Kate

=== Penny Dreadfuls ===
- Varney the Vampyre; or, the Feast of Blood
- The Mysteries of London
- Wagner, the Wehr-Wolf
- The String of Pearls; a Romance
- The Life and Adventures of Valentine Vox, the Ventriloquist
- Vileroy; or, the Horrors of Zindorf Castle
- Angelina; or, The Mystery of St. Mark's Abbey
- Clement Lorimer; or, The Book with the Iron Clasps
- The Life of Richard Palmer; Better Known as Dick Turpin
- The Mysteries of the Madhouse; or Annals of Bedlam
