= Bridge College =

Coordinates: 53°28′23.4″N 2°11′19.5″W

Information
- Established: 1993
- Department for Education URN: 134143 Tables
- Ofsted: Reports
- Head teacher: Mr J Cannon
- Gender: Mixed
- Age: 16 to 25
- Capacity: 95
- Website: www.togethertrust.org.uk/bridge-college

Bridge College is a specialist college in Manchester, England, for students aged 16–25 with disabilities, complex needs and autism. It is on the Openshaw campus of The Manchester College. It is run by the Together Trust charity and has a maximum of 95 students.

== History ==
The college opened on 1 September 1993.
