= Together Trust =

British care charity

- Founded: 1870
- Registration no.: 209782
- Coordinates: 53.3841°N 2.2136°W
- Region served: north-west England
- Product: education; residential care; community services; fostering
- Key people: Melanie Dunn (Chief Executive); Giles Gaddum (Chairman); Sara Bayley (Services Director)
- Website: togethertrust.org.uk
- Formerly called: The Manchester and Salford Boys' and Girls' Refuges and Homes.(1870); Boys and Girls Welfare Society (1960)

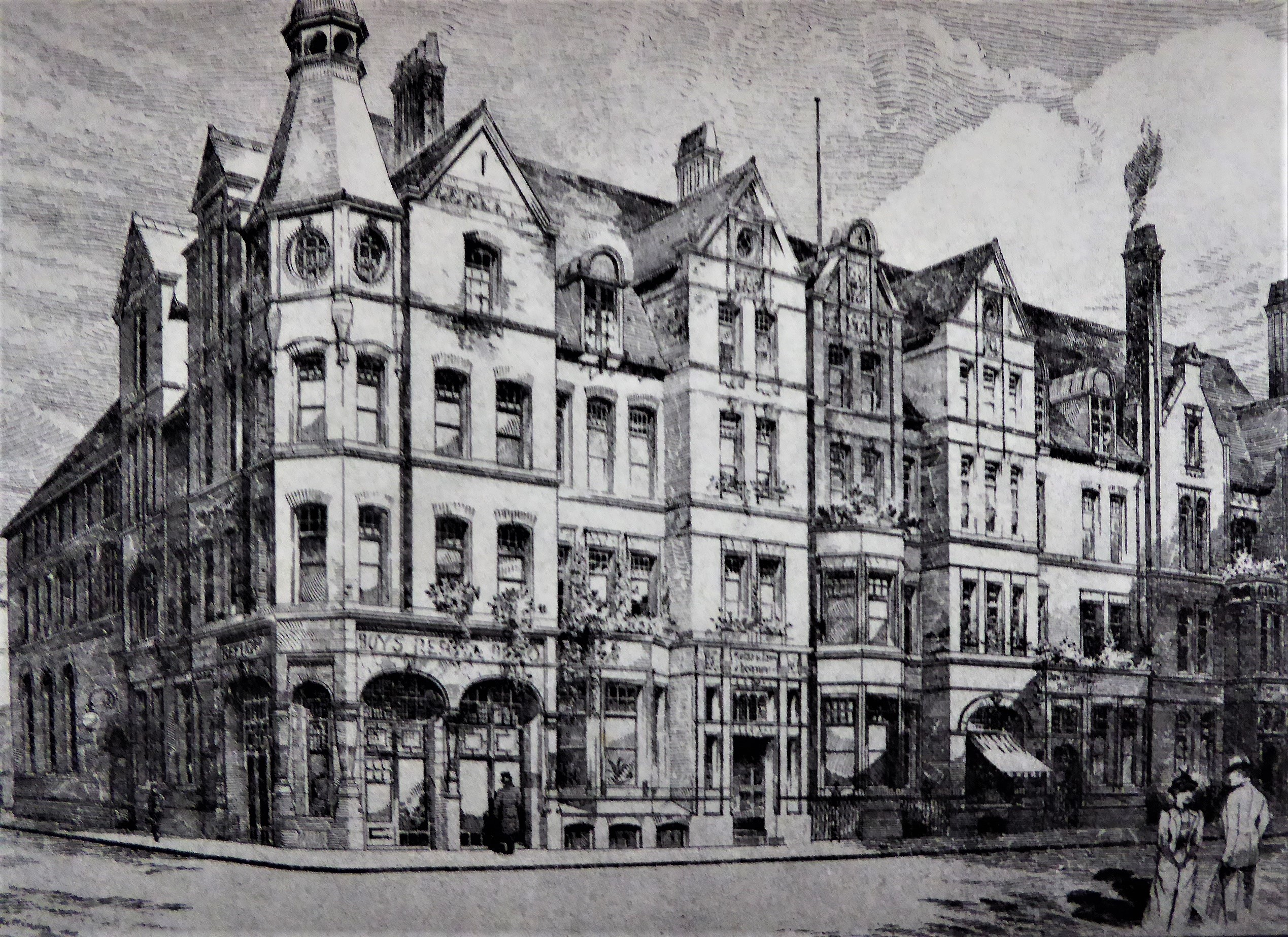
The Manchester and Salford Boys' and Girls' Refuges, 1890

The Together Trust is a British registered charity, founded in 1870 by Leonard Kilbee Shaw and Richard Bramwell Taylor as the Manchester and Salford Boys' and Girls' Refuges and Homes. It provides care, special education and community support services in the north-west of England. It also has a fostering agency.

== Activities ==
The trust runs several schools: Ashcroft School (previously CYCES) for pupils aged 8–18 with behavioural, emotional and social difficulties; Inscape House School in Cheadle, for pupils aged 5–19 with autism; and Bridge College at Openshaw, a college for people aged 16–25 with learning difficulties and disabilities, complex needs, communication disorders and autism.
