= Leonard Kilbee Shaw =

Leonard Kilbee Shaw (1834 - 22 July 1902) was a businessman and philanthropist from Dublin, Ireland. He co-founded the Manchester and Salford Boys' and Girls' Refuges and Homes in 1870, which today continues as the children's charity the Together Trust.

== Early life ==
Shaw was born in 1834 in Dublin, Ireland, the son of Robert and Alicia Shaw. He spent his early years in Ireland, being educated at the Reverend Abraham Jones' Seminary in Holly Mount. The family moved across to Manchester, England in 1847. Here Leonard commenced his business life in one of the large Manchester warehouses where he stayed for the next thirty years, eventually becoming a manager. In 1884 he set up his own business as a merchant and insurance agent. He married Annie Hall, second daughter of Mr. and Mrs. Hall of Shallcross Hall, Whaley Bridge, in Macclesfield in 1866. Five years later they had their first, and only, son Robert.

== Charitable work ==
Shaw is best known for his charitable work. A deeply religious man, he had become responsible for the Young Men's Sunday Class at St. Ann's Church in Manchester and later a Teacher at the Ragged School there. It was there that Shaw became aware of the true scope of homelessness among boys in the city. On 4 January 1871 he and Richard Bramwell Taylor started the Manchester and Salford Boys' and Girls' Refuges and Homes in a small house on Quay Street, Deansgate. The aim was to "reclaim, reform and evangelise" the homeless boys of Manchester while providing them with food, shelter and employment. The program was soon extended to include girls. For the next 32 years Shaw sought out and interviewed street children in an effort to identify those most in need. He also campaigned to improve conditions for those children forced to work on the city's streets.

== Death ==
Leonard Shaw died aged 68 on 22 July 1902 after a short illness. He was buried at St Paul's Church in Kersal. A memorial fund was set up to raise £10,000 for two projects that Shaw had taken a special interest in; a new recreation ground in Cheetham and the enlargement of "Bethesda", a home for children with disabilities. Contributors to the fund over the following months included Thomas John Barnardo and Meta Gaskell, the daughter of Elizabeth Gaskell.
