= Manchester (ancient township) =

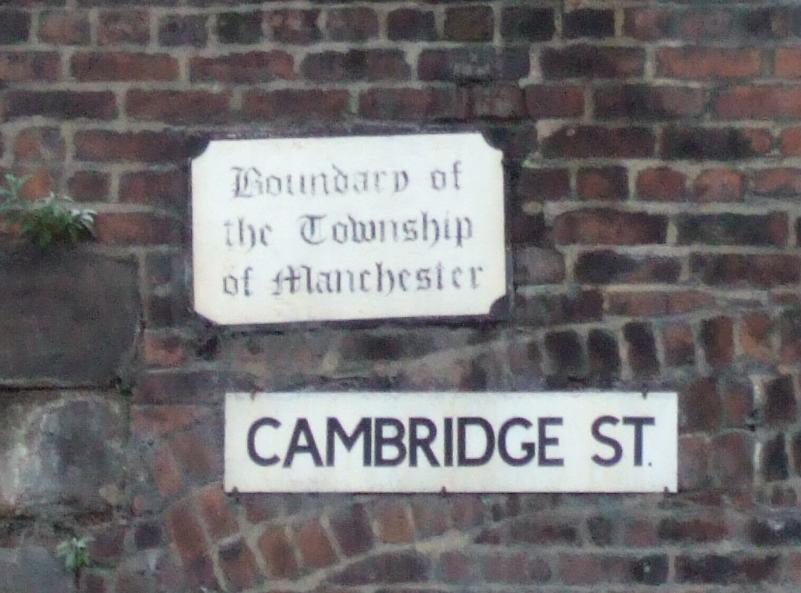
Remaining sign on Cambridge Street, on the southern boundary of the old township.

Manchester Township was one of the many townships and chapelries which formed the ancient parish of Manchester within the Salford hundred of Lancashire, England. It included the area of what is now Manchester city centre and the adjoining area of Ancoats.

In 1792 commissioners, usually known as police commissioners, were established for the improvement of the township. Under the Municipal Corporations Act 1835, the municipal borough of Manchester was established in 1838 as a local authority area, and included the townships of Manchester, Beswick, Cheetham, Chorlton-on-Medlock and Hulme.
