= North Manchester =

Coordinates: 53.5222°N 2.2148°W

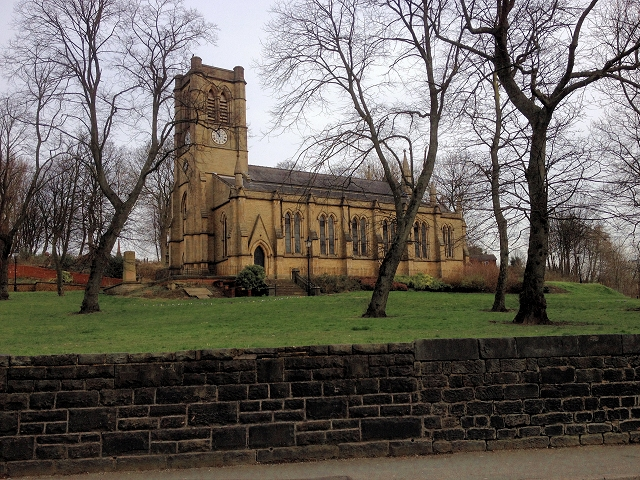
- Blackley

- Location within Greater Manchester
- Metropolitan borough: Manchester
- Metropolitan county: Greater Manchester
- Region: North West
- Country: England
- Sovereign state: United Kingdom
- Police: Greater Manchester
- Fire: Greater Manchester
- Ambulance: North West

North Manchester was, from 1896 to 1916 a civil parish within the Poor Law Union of Manchester, in Lancashire, (now Greater Manchester) England. North Manchester was a local government sub-district used for the administration of Poor Law legislation; it was an inter-parish unit for social security. Although abolished in 1916, the name North Manchester endured for the area, and is still applied to the northern parts of the city, for instance as a registration district up until 1974.

The parish was formed on 26 March 1896 from Beswick, Blackley, Bradford, Cheetham, Clayton, Crumpsall, Harpurhey, Moston and Newton, all of which had been amalgamated into Manchester during the mid-to-late 19th century. On 1 April 1916 the parish was abolished and merged with Manchester. In 1911 the parish had a population of 208,324.

== See also ==
- Manchester Township (England)
