= Beswick, Manchester =

Area of Manchester, England

Coordinates: 53.474256°N 2.202663°W

Beswick
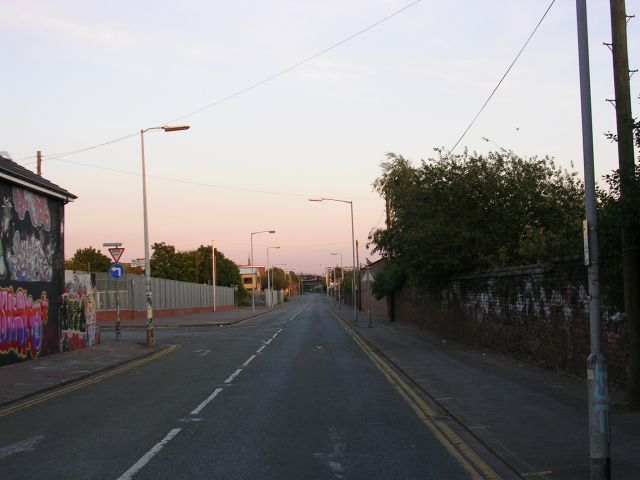
- Gorton Road in Beswick

- Location within Greater Manchester
- OS grid reference: SJ865975
- Metropolitan borough: Manchester
- Metropolitan county: Greater Manchester
- Region: North West
- Country: England
- Sovereign state: United Kingdom
- Post town: MANCHESTER
- Postcode district: M11
- Dialling code: 0161
- Police: Greater Manchester
- Fire: Greater Manchester
- Ambulance: North West

Beswick (/ˈbɛzɪk/) is an area of east Manchester, England. Historically in Lancashire, it neighbours the district of Openshaw to the east. The River Medlock and the Ashton Canal both run through it.

Beswick is close to sporting facilities including the City of Manchester Stadium, the National Squash Centre, the Manchester Regional Athletics Arena and the National Cycling Centre.

The area is also home to East Manchester Academy, a mixed secondary school which opened in 2010, and includes Beswick library.

== History ==
Around 1200–1230 it was known as Bexwic and it is believed to be a combination of a personal name and a settlement or dwelling place. At the height of the Industrial Revolution there was less industry here than in Bradford and it was primarily a residential area of terraced houses.

In 2002, east Manchester was the focus of the XVII Commonwealth Games, which brought new development to the area including the City of Manchester Stadium, National Cycling Centre (Manchester Velodrome), English Institute of Sport, National Squash Centre, Regional Athletics Arena and Indoor Tennis Centre.

== Governance ==
Beswick was the biggest township of the ancient parish of Manchester in Salford hundred of the county of Lancashire. It was also an extra-parochial tract. It became part of the Township of Manchester in 1838, being joined with Ardwick to form a Municipal Ward in the new township. For Poor Law purposes it was added to the Prestwich Poor Law Union, which was constituted by order of the Poor Law Board in 1850. In 1858 Beswick became a separate civil parish, on 26 March 1896 the parish was abolished to form North Manchester. In 1891 the parish had a population of 9691.

== Gallery ==
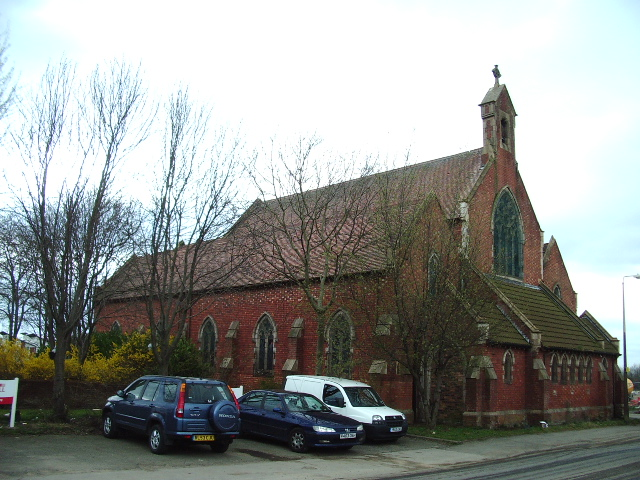
St Jerome with St Silas Church

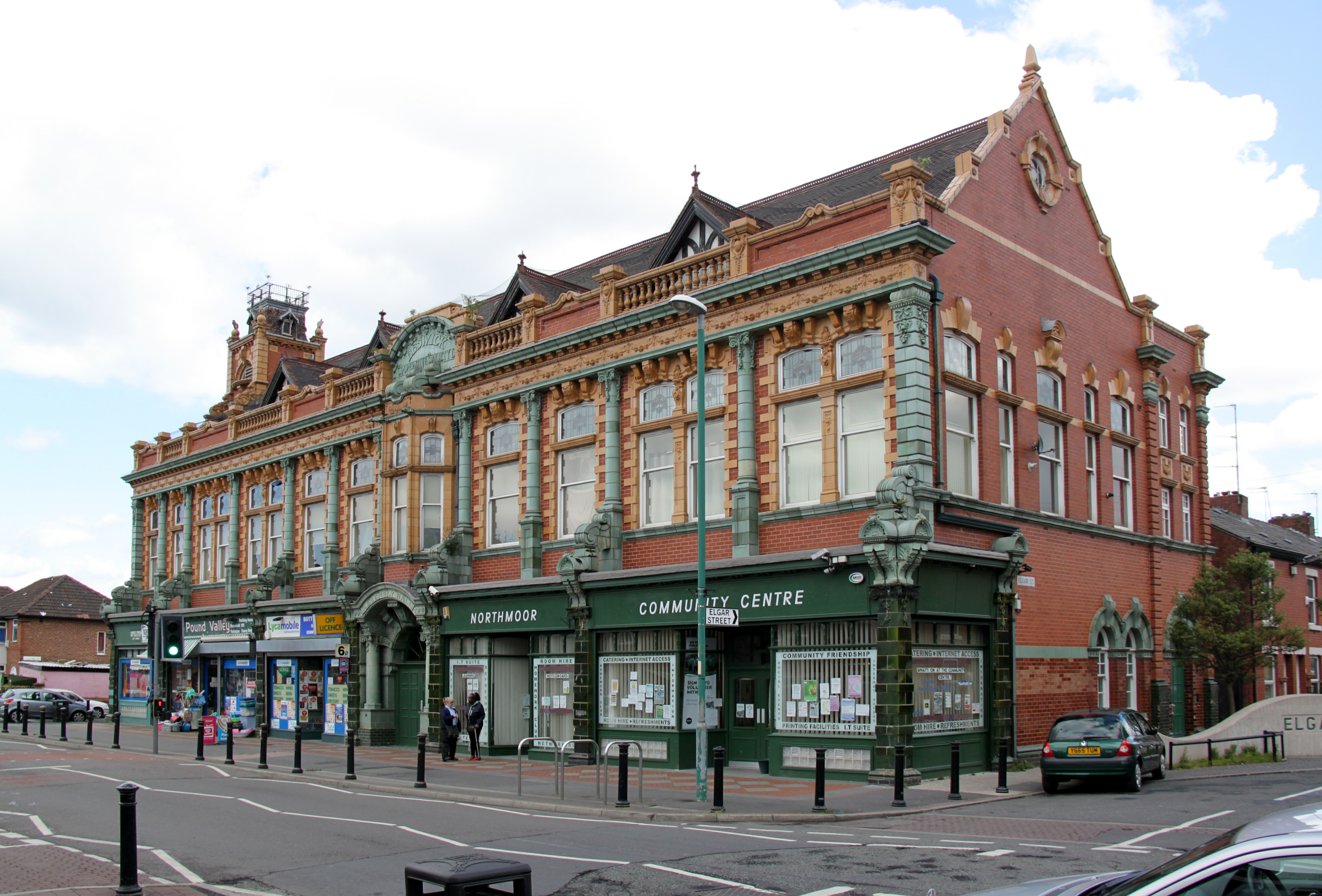
The former Beswick Co-operative Society Building

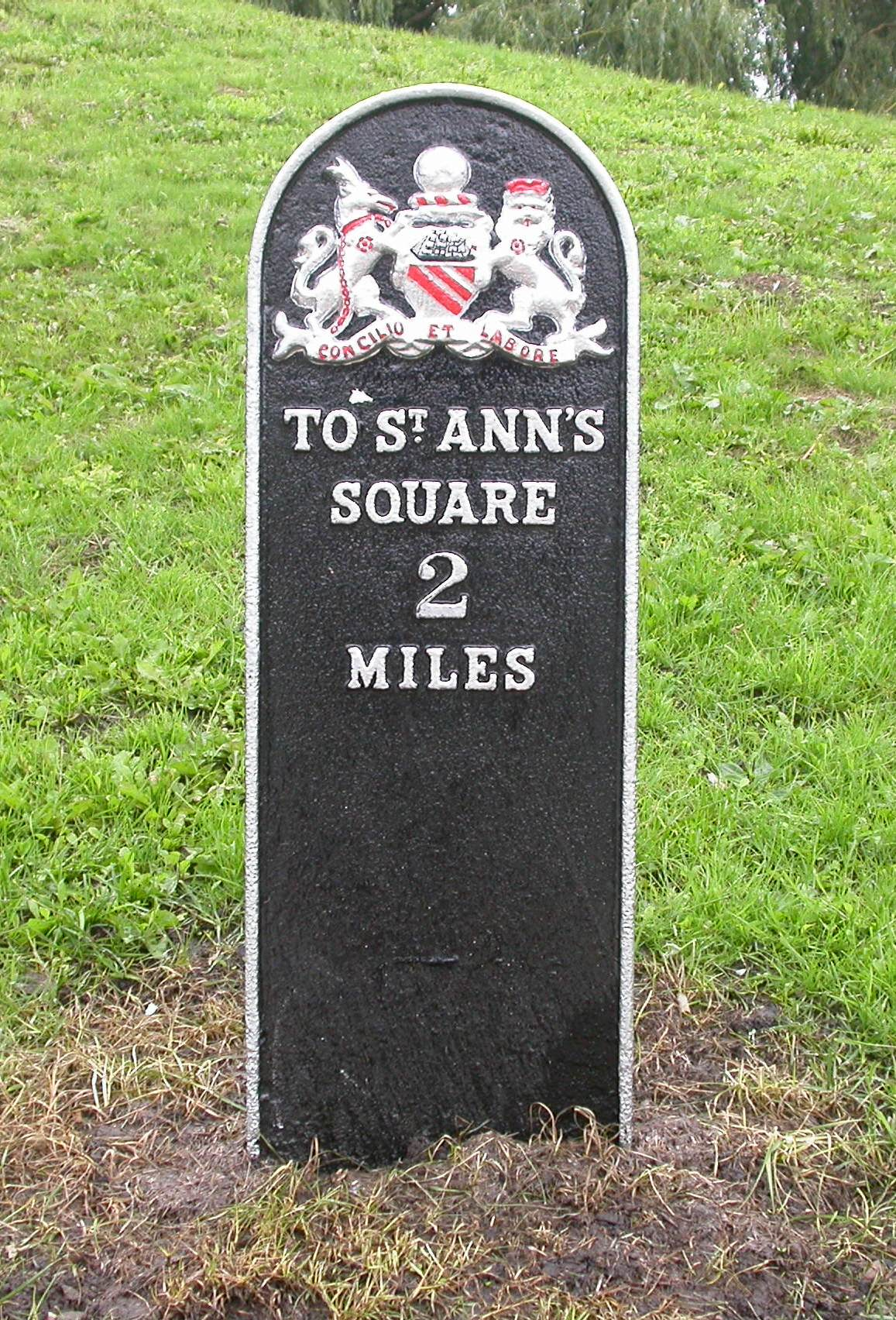
An old milepost by the A662, Ashton New Road
