= Openshaw =

Suburb of Manchester, England

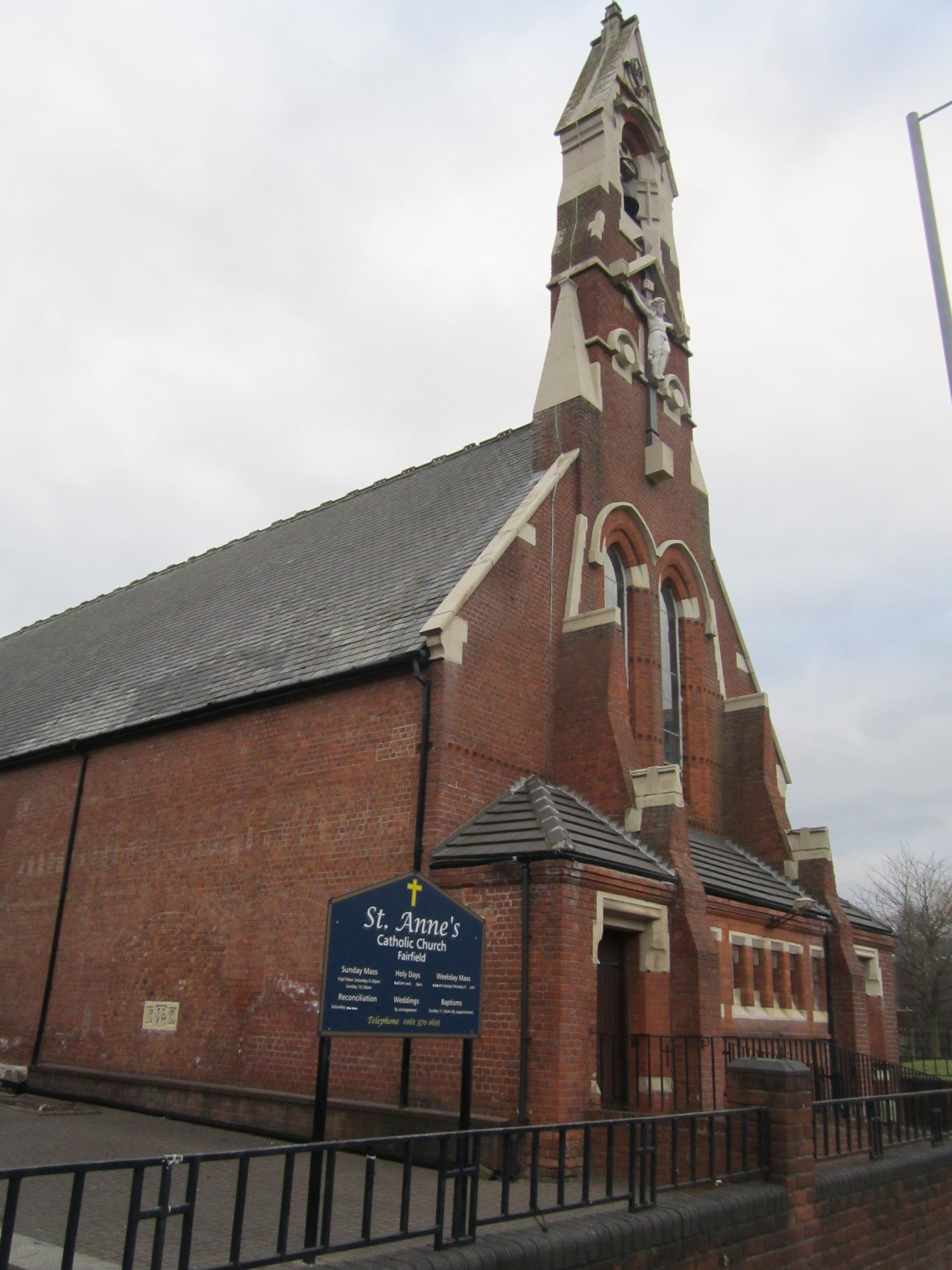
- St Anne's Catholic Church

- Location within Greater Manchester
- OS grid reference: SJ885975
- Metropolitan borough: City of Manchester
- Metropolitan county: Greater Manchester
- Region: North West
- Country: England
- Sovereign state: United Kingdom
- Post town: MANCHESTER
- Postcode district: M11
- Dialling code: 0161
- Police: Greater Manchester
- Fire: Greater Manchester
- Ambulance: North West
- UK Parliament: Manchester Central

Openshaw is a suburb of Manchester, Greater Manchester, England, about three miles east of Manchester city centre. Historically part of Lancashire, Openshaw was incorporated into the city of Manchester in 1890. Its name derives from the Old English Opinschawe, which means an open wood or coppice.

During the Second Industrial Revolution, when Openshaw become an area of heavy industry, socialism and trade unionism flourished. In 1910 the Openshaw Socialists were formed; Keir Hardie, founder of the Labour Party, spoke at their inaugural meeting. Annie Lee became Manchester's first socialist woman alderman in 1936, having been secretary of the Openshaw Independent Labour Party since the 1890s. Following profound de-industrialisation. Openshaw is now a multicultural area with diverse shops and services opening, reflecting the demographic change.

== Industry ==
There is little industry in the district now. Very large enterprises such as a government munitions factory (ordnance works) and associated railway yards were closed after World War I. Companies which employed thousands of people, but of which nothing remains, include Rank Hovis McDougall, Ferguson, Pailin & Co (later GEC Switchgear), the English Steel Corporation, B&S Massey and Crossley, and the Gorton Works of the Manchester, Sheffield & Lincolnshire Railway, later the Great Central Railway followed by the London & North Eastern Railway.

Gorton Works exemplified the industries that sustained the economy of Openshaw and adjacent districts of Manchester during and after the Second Industrial Revolution. (Note: Gorton locomotive works were not related to the Beyer, Peacock & Company's Gorton Foundry.) It was established in 1848 to service locomotives and build carriages and wagons. The first locomotive was built in 1858 and by 1923, Gorton Works had built more than 900 locomotives. The last steam engine was built for British Railways in 1950. The works then produced electric locomotives until it closed in 1963. The site is now the New Smithfield Wholesale Market, Manchester's wholesale fruit and vegetable market. (Note: Location: 53°28′16″N 2°10′37″W.)

Openshaw is, however, within the East Manchester Regeneration Scheme and some new businesses are moving into the area.

== Education ==
There are four primary schools in Openshaw: Higher Openshaw Community Primary School, St Barnabas' CE Primary School, St Clement's CE Primary School and Varna Community Primary School.

Openshaw has Wright Robinson College ; The East Manchester Academy is nearby.

The Openshaw Campus of The Manchester College on Whitworth Street near Ashton Old Road (A635) specialises in new technical and industrial training, including construction craft and building services, motor engineering and computer technology. On this campus is also the Bridge College, a specialist school operated by the Together Trust charity.

== Lime Square redevelopment ==
As part of the area's redevelopment under the East Manchester Regeneration Scheme, a new shopping precinct has been built called Lime Square. The majority of Lime Square is taken up by a supermarket that was built in 2010.

== Transport ==
Gorton railway station provides frequent trains to Manchester Piccadilly on the Glossop–Hadfield and Rose Hill Marple line.

Openshaw is served by several bus services, most services are operated by Stagecoach Manchester.

- 7: Ashton-under-Lyne – Gorton – Reddish – Stockport
- 7A: Ashton-under-Lyne – Gorton – Reddish – Stockport
- 7B: Ashton-under-Lyne – Droylsden – Reddish – Stockport
- 171: Newton Heath – Gorton – Levenshulme – East Didsbury – Withington Hospital
- 172: Chorlton-cum-Hardy – West Didsbury – Levenshulme – Gorton – Newton Heath
- 219: Manchester – Openshaw – Guide Bridge – Ashton-under-Lyne – Stalybridge
- 220: Manchester – Openshaw – Audenshaw – Dukinfield – Stalybridge
- 221: Dukinfield – Audenshaw – Openshaw – Manchester

== Music ==
English actor and lead vocalist for the Monkees, Davy Jones, was born in Leamington Street, Openshaw.

Composer Peter McGarr, born in 1953, lived in Openshaw for many years.

== Openshaw media ==
From March 2002, the North East Manchester Advertiser newspaper was delivered free to every home in Openshaw, providing a local news source. However, in September 2012 the newspaper ceased publication. The Openshaw Gazette was launched in the same month; it now exists as a Facebook page and Twitter account.

== History ==
Openshaw was formerly a township and chapelry in the parish of Manchester, in 1866 Openshaw became a separate civil parish, on 26 March 1896 the parish was abolished to form South Manchester. In 1891 the parish had a population of 23,927.
