= Listed buildings in Manchester-M18 =

Manchester is a city in Northwest England. The M18 postcode area is to the southeast of the city centre, and contains the area of Gorton. The postcode area contains 14 listed buildings that are recorded in the National Heritage List for England. Of these, three are listed at Grade II*, the middle grade of the three grades, and the others are at Grade II, the lowest grade. The area is now mainly residential, and the listed buildings include houses, churches, a mausoleum, a public house, a war memorial, and a former school.

== Key ==
Grade	Criteria
II*	Particularly important buildings of more than special interest
II	Buildings of national importance and special interest

== Buildings ==
Name and location	Photograph	Date	Notes	Grade
46–50 Far Lane; 53.45888°N 2.16945°W	—	1762	A row of three cottages in yellow and red brick with a slate roof. They have two storeys with basements, a double-depth plan, and one bay each. Steps lead up to the doorways, the windows on the ground floor are square with keystones, on the upper floor they are rectangular, and all have altered glazing. On the upper floor is an ogee-headed niche containing a datestone.	II
56–60 Tan Yard Brow; 53.46113°N 2.16453°W		Late 18th century	A row of three brick houses with a stone-slate roof for tannery workers. They have two storeys and basements, a double-depth plan, and one bay each. The ground floor windows have segmental heads, some windows are mullioned, some have casements, and others have been altered.	II
Gorton House; 53.45951°N 2.15873°W	—	Late 18th century	A red brick house with sandstone dressings, a dentilled eaves cornice, and a slate roof. There are two storeys, a basement and an attic, two parallel double-pile wings, and a symmetrical three-bay front. The central doorway has an Ionic doorcase with a pediment and a fanlight. Flanking this are two-storey canted bay windows with hipped roofs. Most of the windows are sashes.	II
Spring Bank Farmhouse and farm building 53.46141°N 2.16499°W	—	c. 1780	The former farmhouse and farm building are in roughcast brick, the house has a roof of composition tiles, and the farm building has a stone-slate roof. The house has two low storeys, a double-depth plan, three bays, and a rear wing. There is a central doorway with a bay window to the right, and casement windows on the upper floor. The farm building to the left has a wagon entrance, varied windows including horizontally-sliding sash windows, a square pitching hole, and vents in a diamond pattern.	II
60–66 High Bank; 53.46209°N 2.16506°W	—	c. 1800	A row of four brick cottages with a slate roof, hipped at the left end. They have two storeys with basements, a front of four bays, and a rear wing at the left. The basement windows have been altered, the other windows being casements, those on the ground floor with segmental heads.	II
St Francis' Church and monastic building 53.46837°N 2.18733°W		1864–1872	A Roman Catholic church designed by E. W. Pugin, it is in red brick with dressings in sandstone and blue brick, and a slate roof. It consists of a nave with a clerestory, east and west aisles, a south narthex, and a north chancel with a polygonal apse. At the south end are four gabled portals with balustraded parapets, between which are stepped buttresses. At the top is a Crucifix with a canopy, over which is a bellcote with a spirelet. From the east side of the church is a cloister, with a three-storey return containing sash windows and a bellcote.	II*
Brookfield Unitarian Church; 53.45991°N 2.16844°W		1869–1871	The Unitarian church was designed by Thomas Worthington in Early English style, and paid for by the engineer Richard Peacock. It is in sandstone with a slate roof, and consists of a nave with a clerestory, north and south aisles, a chancel with transepts, and a free-standing northwest steeple. The steeple has a four-stage tower with angle buttresses, a north doorway, an embattled parapet with corner gargoyles, and a broach spire with lucarnes.	II*
Lodge, wall and gates, Brookfield Unitarian Church; 53.45992°N 2.16770°W	—	c. 1870	The lodge is in sandstone with a slate roof, one storey, an L-shaped plan with a gable facing the road, and a right wing. There is a segmental-headed doorway, a mullioned window, and a fleur-de-lys finial on the gable. To the right is a churchyard wall with chamfered coping and two gateways with cast iron gates.	II
St James' Church; 53.46459°N 2.17293°W		1871	The church, paid for by Charles Beyer, is in sandstone with a slate roof, and is in Decorated style. It consists of a nave with a clerestory, north and south aisles, north and south transepts, a chancel, and a northwest steeple. The steeple has a three-stage tower with angle buttresses, a circular stair turret with an embattled parapet, a north doorway with a moulded surround, and a broach spire with lucarnes.	II
Peacock Mausoleum; 53.45999°N 2.16873°W		c. 1875	The mausoleum, designed by Thomas Worthington in French Gothic style, is in the churchyard of Brookfield Unitarian Church, to the west of the church. It commemorates Joseph Peacock, the son of the engineer Richard Peacock, and is in stone, with a rectangular plan. The mausoleum consists of a three-bay shrine with a steeply pitched roof, on an inscribed pedestal with a base of four steps. The shrine has gabled buttresses and is decorated with carvings of human heads, bats and leaves, and on the corners are statues with cusped canopies.	II*
The Plough Hotel; 53.46094°N 2.17124°W		Late 19th century	The public house is in red brick with red sandstone dressings, a bracketed eaves cornice, and a slate roof with red ridge tiles. There are two storeys and four bays, the outer bays projecting with gables containing mock timber framing, bargeboards, and finials. The doorway in the second bay has a stone architrave, with a single-storey canted bay window to the right. The outer bays have two-storey caned bay windows, and all the windows are sashes. To the left is an earlier block.	II
Brookfield Unitarian Church Sunday School; 53.45997°N 2.16936°W		1899	The school, designed by Thomas Worthington in Gothic style, has since been converted into flats. It is in sandstone and has a slate roof with coped gables and finials. The building consists of a single-storey six-bay hall range, a west cross-wing, a porch at the east end, and a south lean-to aisle. The hall range has a plinth, buttresses, a sill band, a parapet, and two gables. On the roof is a bell turret in the form of a flèche. Some windows have transoms, and others have mullions and transoms.	II
Gorton and Abbey Hey War Memorial; 53.46873°N 2.16577°W		c. 1920	The war memorial stands on the pavement at a road junction, it is in pink granite, and consists of a square pillar with a moulded base and capital, and is surmounted by a short circular column with a finial in the form of a Tudor crown. The pillar has a moulded cornice with an arch containing a laurel wreath, and a frieze with triglyphs and Lancashire roses. On each side of the pillar and base are inscriptions and the names of those lost in the two World Wars.	II
Church of Our Lady of Mercy and St Thomas of Canterbury; 53.45484°N 2.18026°W		1927	The church was designed by Walter Tapper, the narthex was added in 1983, but the church was never completed. It is in red brick with a red tiled roof, and consists of a nave with aisles, and a chancel with an apse, a north chapel and south vestries.	II
