= The Plough, Gorton =

Listed pub in Manchester, England

The Plough
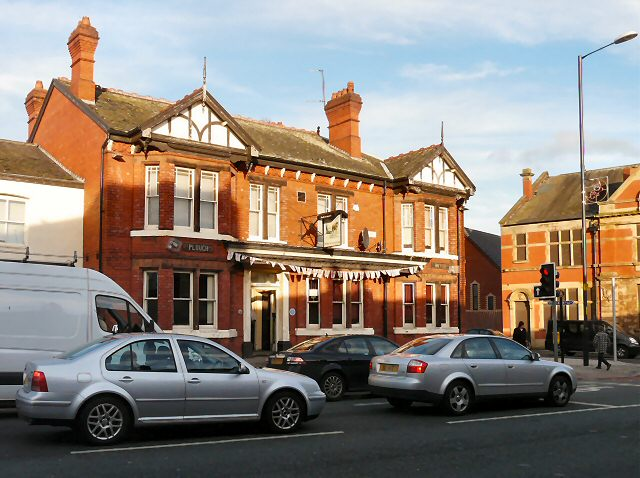
- The pub in 2010

- Location within Greater Manchester

General information
- Type: Public house
- Location: 927 Hyde Road, Gorton, Manchester, England
- Coordinates: 53.4610°N 2.1714°W
- Year built: Late 19th century
- Renovated: 2013 (refurbished)
- Owner: Robinsons Brewery

Design and construction
- Designations

Listed Building – Grade II
- Official name: The Plough Hotel
- Designated: 7 March 1994
- Reference no.: 1200820

Website
- Official website

The Plough is a Grade II listed public house on Hyde Road in Gorton, an area of Manchester, England. Standing on the site of an early-19th‑century beerhouse, it was rebuilt in the late Victorian period and keeps much of its historic plan, fittings and earlier cellars.

== History ==
The Plough was built in the late 19th century, incorporating parts of an earlier building. It stands on the site of a beerhouse recorded as licensed in 1823, and some of the surviving cellars, an outbuilding, and part of the rear wall appear to date from the early 19th century. In 1937 the pub was acquired by Frederic Robinson of Robinsons Brewery.

On 7 March 1994, the pub was designated a Grade II listed building. The pub was included on the Campaign for Real Ale (CAMRA)'s National Inventory of Historic Pub Interiors under the previous classification system. Under CAMRA's current grading scheme, it is awarded three stars and its interior is regarded as being "of outstanding national historic importance".

== Architecture ==
=== Exterior ===
The pub is constructed of brick in English garden-wall bond with stone and terracotta detailing, gabled bays and sash windows, and decorative features such as bargeboards, finials and a deep eaves cornice. Signage in stone and terracotta survives, and several ground‑floor windows still carry etched and cut glass. The right‑hand side includes an entrance to the former outdoor department, marked by a stone canopy on carved brackets.

=== Interior ===
Inside, the layout from the Victorian rebuilding remains largely intact. A tiled vestibule leads to a hall with a black‑and‑white mosaic floor and a dado of dark green glazed tiles with pale blue and cream panels, a scheme that continues up the stairwell. Lobby screens, glazed doors and fixed seating with bell‑pushes survive in the rooms to the left, while the vault retains its bench seating, decorative plasterwork and a detailed timber bar with foliated brackets and a mirrored bar‑back.

The pub also keeps a range of original fittings, including vertically hung bar hatches with coloured and textured glass, decorative glazing in the swing doors, and further tiled finishes in the outdoor department. The first‑floor meeting room retains its original fireplaces, and only the rear room on the ground floor has later alteration.

Below, the cellars include three brick‑vaulted chambers from an earlier building on the site, alongside a later cellar with brick jack arches added during the 19th‑century rebuild.

== See also ==
- Listed buildings in Manchester-M18
- Listed pubs in Greater Manchester
