= William Grindley Craig =

Scottish railway engineer and designer

William Grindley Craig (30 March 1819 – 24 January 1886) was a Scottish railway engineer and designer who was locomotive superintendent of the Manchester, Sheffield and Lincolnshire Railway from 1854–1859. He was present, as an expert witness, at an enquiry into the Round Oak rail accident in 1858. He was succeeded by Charles Sacre.

Craig was born near Glasgow in 1819. He died in Saint-Jean-de-Luz in 1886.

== Career ==
=== Taff Vale Railway ===
He was Locomotive Superintendent of the Taff Vale Railway from 1844 to 1845. His appointment on the TVR was brief, a fate shared by a handful of engineers about this time on that railway.

=== Neath Abbey Ironworks ===
He worked in another capacity at the Neath Abbey Ironworks, probably from 1844 to 1849.

=== Monmouthshire Railway and Canal Company ===
He worked for the Monmouthshire Railway and Canal Company from 1849 to 1854. On the MR&CC Craig was responsible for the following locomotives, all of which were built by private manufacturers, including Neath Abbey Ironworks:

- 2 x 0-6-0 (1850)
- 2 x 0-4-0WT (1850)
- 1 x 4-4-0 (1850)
- 6 x 4-4-0T (1853)
- 6 x 0-6-0WT (1854)

For more information about these locomotives, see Locomotives of the Great Western Railway.

=== Manchester, Sheffield and Lincolnshire Railway ===
Craig worked for the Manchester, Sheffield and Lincolnshire Railway from 1854 to 1859. This was Craig's last senior railway appointment, succeeding Richard Peacock of Beyer, Peacock and Company fame. On the MS&LR, he attracted a salary of £500 a year, plus bonus payments based on savings made. He later became a cost-saving himself when his contract was not renewed following a reorganisation. He was replaced by Charles Reboul Sacre, late of the Great Northern Railway, but was retained as a consultant. The locomotives Craig added to MS&LR stock comprised:

- 2 x 0-6-0 (1854)
- 1 x 2-2-2WT (1856)
- 3 x 0-6-0 (1858–59)

At least one of the company's ships was also designed by him.

=== Consulting engineer ===
In 1861 Craig was living in north London, employed as a civil consulting engineer and by ten years later was still there but had added iron merchant to his occupations.

== Family ==
By 1881 he had moved to Wiltshire, where his wife Eliza Ellen Langley (1827-1882), whom he had married in 1848, died. Craig had at least four children, two girls born in Newport, Monmouthshire, and a boy and girl born during his time at Gorton, Manchester. He died in St.Jean de Luz Basse Pyrenees, France 24/01/1886, leaving a will and naming one of his spinster daughters as executor.

== See also ==
- Lists of rail accidents

== Sources ==
- The Locomotives of the GWR, vols. 3 & 10, RCTS
- Great Central, vol.1, G.Dow
- Ian Allan ABC of British Railways Locomotives, summer 1961 edition, page 58

Business positions
Preceded by Richard Peacock	Chief Mechanical Engineer of the Manchester, Sheffield and Lincolnshire Railway; 1854–1859	Succeeded by Charles Sacré
