= Charles Sacré =

English engineer (1831–1889)

Charles Reboul Sacré
- Born: 4 September 1831
- Died: 3 August 1889 (aged 57)
- Occupation: Engineer

Charles Reboul Sacré (4 September 1831 – 3 August 1889) was an English engineer, Engineer and Superintendent of the Locomotive and Stores Department of the Manchester, Sheffield and Lincolnshire Railway. Samuel Waite Johnson was his assistant between 1859 and 1864. Sacre retired in 1886 and committed suicide by shooting himself, reputedly due to the Penistone rail crash of 1884.

== Early life ==
Charles Sacre was one of thirteen children born to John Joseph Berlot de Sacre. The family was of Huguenot origin. He was articled to Archibald Sturrock at the Great Northern Railway works at Boston, Lincolnshire in 1846, and upon the completion of the apprenticeship, he was appointed Assistant Locomotive Superintendent at Peterborough. (This was an out-station of the new central workshop at Doncaster, which opened in 1853.)

== Career at the Manchester, Sheffield and Lincolnshire Railway ==
In 1858, he was appointed Chief Engineer and Locomotive Engineer of the Manchester, Sheffield and Lincolnshire Railway, commencing work at their Gorton works on 1 April 1859. His employees found him a friendly and approachable man, and he became popular with the work force. He was responsible for an outstanding series of double framed 0-6-0 goods engines, the largest of which were a class of sixty built in 1880-5. For the fast expresses that were being introduced on the Cheshire Lines Railway, he designed a massive outside cylinder 2-2-2 with 7 ft. 6ins. (2.286 metre) driving wheels. Another successful design was an inside cylinder 4-4-0 with double frames. Several of the 0-6-0 and 4-4-0 locomotives lasted in service until the 1920s. In the realm of civil engineering, he suggested extending the then main line by a tunnel under the Humber to Hull, but this brought him into conflict with Edward Watkin, the Company Chairman.

== The Penistone Accident ==
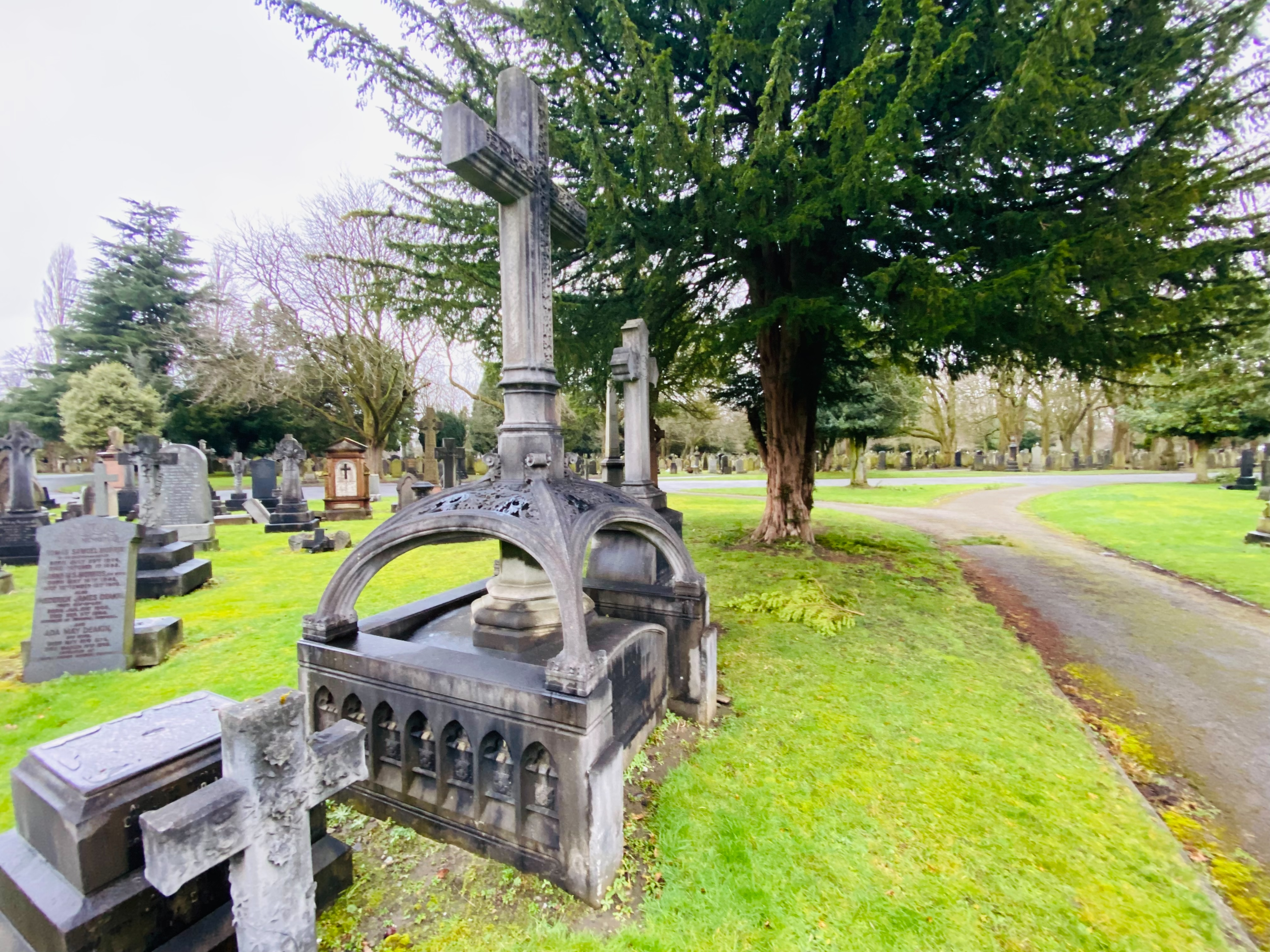
Sacré's grave in Southern Cemetery, Manchester

Sacre was deeply affected by the Penistone rail crash, which happened on 16 July 1884. This was caused by the breaking of the crank-axle of No. 434, a 4-4-0 locomotive, and resulted in nineteen deaths (including Massey Bromley, the Locomotive Superintendent of the Great Eastern Railway and a close friend of Sacre). Although no blame could possibly be attached to Sacre, he felt responsible, partly because he had given in to pressure from Watkin to adopt the Smith non-automatic brake. In 1885 he decided to retire at the early age of 53, though he agreed to continue to act as a consultant to the railway. However, he gradually lost the will to live. On 3 August 1889, he shot himself with a revolver.

== Professional life ==
He became a Member of the Institute of Mechanical Engineers in 1859, and a Member of the Institution of Civil Engineers in 1867.

Business positions
| Preceded by William Grindley Craig | Engineer and Superintendent of the Locomotive and Stores Department of the Manchester, Sheffield and Lincolnshire Railway; 1859-1886 | Succeeded by Thomas Parker |
