= Memorial Hall, Manchester =

Listed building in Manchester, England

Memorial Hall
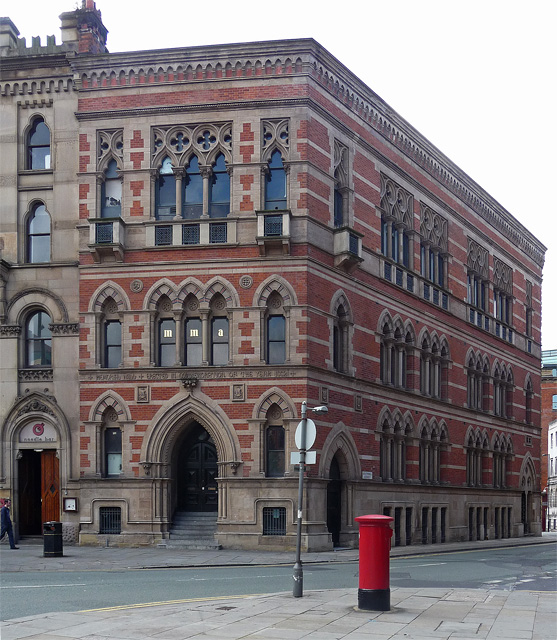
- The Memorial Hall in 2011
- Former names: Albert Square Chop House
- Alternative names: Fountain House

General information
- Type: Meeting hall (former); Gastropub, public house, events space (current)
- Architectural style: Venetian Gothic Revival
- Location: Southmill Street; Albert Square, Manchester, England
- Coordinates: 53.4788°N 2.2461°W
- Year built: 1864–1866; 160 years ago

Design and construction
- Architect: Thomas Worthington
- Main contractor: Bowden, Edwards and Forster
- Designations

Listed Building – Grade II*
- Official name: Memorial Hall
- Designated: 14 February 1972
- Reference no.: 1254637

Website
- thefountainhouse.co.uk

The Memorial Hall (now operating as the Fountain House) is a Grade II* listed former meeting hall on Southmill Street facing Albert Square in Manchester, England. Built between 1864 and 1866 to commemorate the bicentenary of the 1662 Act of Uniformity, it was designed by Thomas Worthington. The hall became a centre for numerous Victorian societies in the late 19th century and was included in the Albert Square conservation area in 1972. After a period of dereliction in the early 21st century, it was renovated around 2012 and reopened as the Albert Square Chop House, later becoming the Fountain House in 2021. It now operates as a gastropub, public house and events venue, and the building is recognised as one of Manchester's finest examples of Venetian Gothic Revival architecture.

== History ==
The building was constructed between 1864 and 1866 as a meeting hall, according to its official listing. It was designed by Thomas Worthington, who ran a large and successful architectural practice in Manchester. He produced the design after his second tour of Italy in 1858. The foundation stone was laid on 15 June 1864 at the junction of Lloyd Street and Cross Street by Alderman Mackie. The main contractors for the work were Bowden, Edwards and Forster. The hall was built to mark the bicentenary of the 1662 Act of Uniformity, when the departure of around 2,000 Anglican clergy led to the emergence of Nonconformism. Surplus funds from the Albert Memorial were used to finance the project.

In the late 19th century, the hall served as a meeting place for a wide range of Victorian societies, including the Photographic, Statistical, Horticultural, Elocutionists and Positivists Societies. Other regular users included the Home Missionary Board, Sir Charles Hallé's choir and the Manchester Unitarian Sunday School Union. The ground floor and basement were let out to generate income for the hall's upkeep.

On 14 February 1972, the hall was designated a Grade II* listed building, and in the same year the site was also included within the newly designated Albert Square conservation area.

After a period of disuse and dereliction in the early 21st century, the hall was renovated around 2012 and opened as a bar, restaurant and hotel called the Albert Square Chop House. In November 2021, the venue became the Fountain House. At launch, three of the building's floors were made available: the lower ground floor for gastropub dining, the ground floor as a public house, and the first floor providing private dining and rooms for events such as weddings and meetings.

== Architecture ==
The building is constructed in red brick with sandstone and coloured detailing, and its roof is not visible from street level. It occupies a corner plot with a slightly angled footprint and is designed in a Venetian Gothic Revival manner. A contemporary review described it as one of Manchester's finest examples of the style, drawing inspiration from buildings such as the Ca' d'Oro in Venice, with refined stone tracery and a notably grand exterior. It has three storeys above a basement, with a narrow three‑window front facing Albert Square and a longer six‑window elevation along Southmill Street. The sandstone basement forms a clear base, and the exterior is marked by horizontal stone bands at each floor, a shaped band above the second floor, and a row of corbels beneath the main cornice.

The Albert Square front features a tall, two‑centred arched entrance with layered mouldings and dog‑tooth ornament, reached by internal steps. It is flanked by pointed windows with slender shafts and coloured outer mouldings. The detailing is described as fine, with "the subtlety of the polychromy (being) achieved by careful choice of materials". Above the entrance is a band with raised lettering reading "MEMORIAL HALL ERECTED IN COMMEMORATION OF THE YEAR 1662". The upper floors have windows arranged one–three–one: the first‑floor windows follow the ground‑floor pattern, while the second‑floor windows are larger and square‑headed, with decorative caps, cusped lights, quatrefoil tracery, and small stone balconies to the outer openings.

The Southmill Street side has an arched doorway at each end and matching window types arranged in a sequence of one, then two sets of three, then two sets of three, and finally one at the top floor.

== See also ==
- Congregational Memorial Hall — the Memorial Hall in London
- Grade II* listed buildings in Greater Manchester
- Listed buildings in Manchester-M2
- Listed pubs in Manchester
