= Gorton Monastery =

English former Franciscan friary

Church and Friary of St Francis
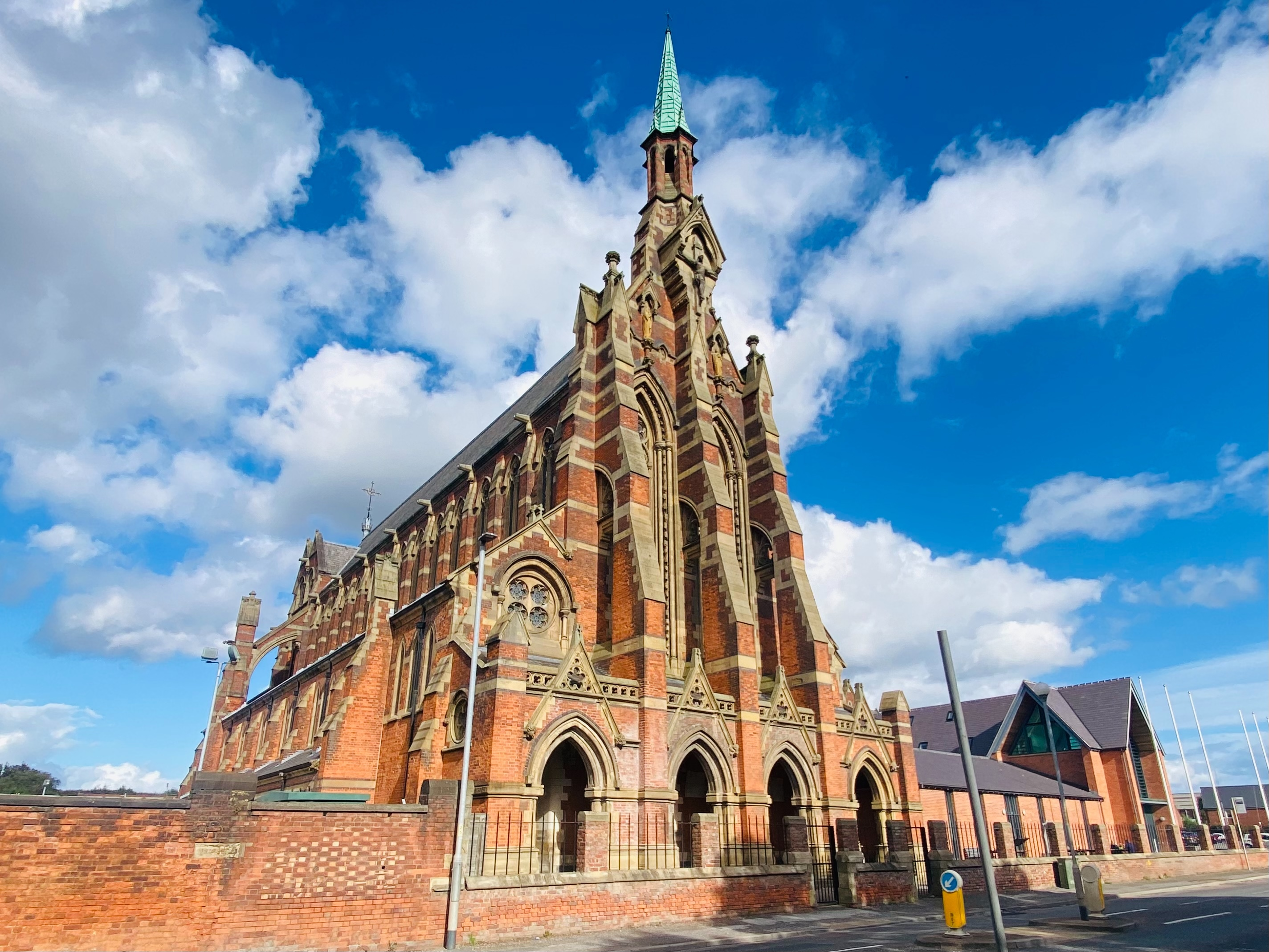

- Location within Greater Manchester

Religion
- Affiliation: Catholic (Franciscan Recollects)
- Ecclesiastical or organizational status: Friary
- Year consecrated: 1872
- Status: Secular events venue

Location
- Location: Gorton Lane, Gorton, Manchester, England
- Municipality: City of Manchester
- Interactive map of Church and Friary of St Francis
- Coordinates: 53°28′06″N 2°11′15″W

Architecture
- Architect: Edward Welby Pugin
- Style: High Victorian Gothic architecture
- Groundbreaking: 1866
- Completed: 1872
- Construction cost: £8,000

Specifications
- Direction of façade: South
- Length: 180 feet (55 m)
- Height (max): 230 feet (70 m)
- Materials: Polychomatic brick, sandstone dressing

Website
- themonastery.co.uk

The Church and Friary of St Francis, known locally as Gorton Monastery, is a Grade II* listed former Franciscan friary on Gorton Lane in Gorton, an area of Manchester, England. It was designed by the Victorian architect Edward Welby Pugin and built between 1866 and 1872. Gorton Monastery is a noted example of Gothic Revival architecture.

The building ceased to be used for Christian worship in 1989 and fell derelict for many years. Following a restoration programme, it reopened in 2007 and now operates as a secular events venue and as a community and heritage space.

== History ==
In 1861 the then Bishop of Salford, Herbert Vaughan, invited a Belgian community of Recollects, a branch of the Franciscan Order of Friars Minor, to come to Manchester and found a new church. The Franciscans arrived in Gorton in December 1861 and began work on a new friary. The construction lasted from 1863 to 1867, and most of the building work was done by the friars themselves, with a brother acting as clerk of works.

The noted architect Edward Welby Pugin (1834–1875) was appointed to design the new monastery church. Pugin was the son of the celebrated architect Augustus Pugin, who championed the revival of Gothic as the style of architecture which was the ideal expression of Catholic faith and worship in church buildings. Edward Welby Pugin had designed two other large Catholic churches in Manchester, St Ann's, Stretford (1863) and All Saints' Church, Urmston (1868). The foundation stone for the Gorton Monastery church was laid in 1866 and it was completed and consecrated in 1872.

The monastery closed for worship in 1989. The building was sold to a property developer, who stripped the monastery of its furnishings and fittings, including mahogany pews, oak doors and sculptures. A pipe organ built by Wadsworth Bros of Manchester was sold for scrap. The property developer subsequently went bankrupt and the scheme to convert the monastery into flats was abandoned. The monastery lay empty and derelict for many years and suffered from vandalism and looting.

In 1997 Gorton Monastery was placed on the World Monuments Fund Watch List of 100 Most Endangered Sites in the World alongside Pompeii, the Taj Mahal and the Valley of the Kings.

=== Modern developments ===
A campaign was begun to save Gorton Monastery, and a charitable trust, the Monastery of St Francis and Gorton Trust, was set up by Cheshire businesswoman Elaine Griffiths and her husband Paul Griffiths, who had served as an altar boy at the monastery during the 1960s. Following bankruptcy of the property developers, the building was in the hands of receivers. It was bought by campaigners in 1997 for the sum of £1.

The trustees applied for funding from the Heritage Lottery Fund, English Heritage and European Regional Development Fund to restore the monastery. Their first proposal for an educational and arts centre was rejected as it was considered too uncommercial for Lottery funding. The second scheme, for a hotel and conference and centre, was also turned down as it was too commercial. A new proposal for an events and weddings venue was successful and the requisite funding was secured in 2003. The church and associated friary buildings underwent a £6 million restoration programme which was completed in June 2007. A separate trading company, The Monastery Manchester Ltd, was set up to operate the premises on a commercial basis as a venue for conferences, business meetings weddings and community events.

In 2013 the volunteers of the Monastery of St Francis and Gorton Trust were awarded the Queen's Award for Voluntary Service. In November 2013, Queen Elizabeth II and Prince Philip visited the monastery for a private lunch during a visit to the area.

Construction of a new "Welcome Wing" with facilities for education and the community, along with further restoration on the altars, decorations, and floor tiles, started in February 2016, following from a £1 million donation from Norman Stoller in September 2014, and £2 million from the Heritage Lottery Fund in December 2014. The wing, designed by Eco Arc, was built by HH Smith & Sons Ltd on the footprint of a building that was demolished in the 1960s.

In March 2017, a memorial service was held in Gorton Monastery for Sir Gerald Kaufman, MP for Manchester Gorton and supporter of the monastery restoration project.

In 2021 the Manchester Camerata chamber orchestra established Gorton Monastery as its new home.

== Architecture ==
Edward Welby Pugin's monastery church is a tall and imposing polychromatic red and blue brick building inspired by the late 13-century Gothic style with sandstone dressing.

Unlike the traditional liturgical east and west alignment, the monastery church sits on a north–south alignment. At the north end is a polygonal apse. The south front facing the main street is elaborately decorated with Gothic features with strong vertical emphasis. Three oversized, full-height flying buttresses are surmounted by canopied statues and a large central sculpted crucifix. The pinnacle of the south front is an ornate bellcote topped with a small spire. Between the buttresses are two high lancet windows with elaborate stone tracery, flanked by rose windows. At ground level is a narthex with four Gothic arches, leading to two central arched doorways.

To the east of the church is a cloister and the monastery building, a plain, three-storey brick building with sashed windows, chimneys and a bellcote. (Note: In the 1970s E.T. Spashett, consultant architect to the Benedictines and architect of the Church Army Chapel, Blackheath, re-designed the accommodation over the cloisters, combining cells to make small dormitories and studies, and designing a new iron gate for the cloisters. This work included a large, reflective, gold, cross-shaped window (now lost), which at certain seasons caused a gold cross-shaped reflection on the public roadway. The gate and the new three-windowed cells still existed as of 2012.(Information from the archives of the architect - to be deposited in the RIBA archives in 2010 - and from the archivist at Gorton Monastery))

On 18 December 1963, Gorton Monastery was designated a Grade II* listed building.

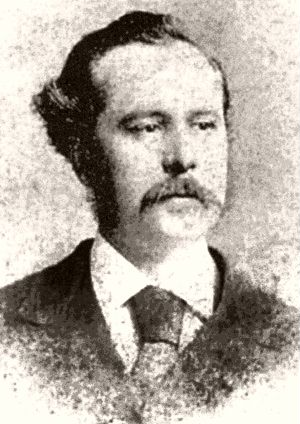
Architect Edward Welby Pugin

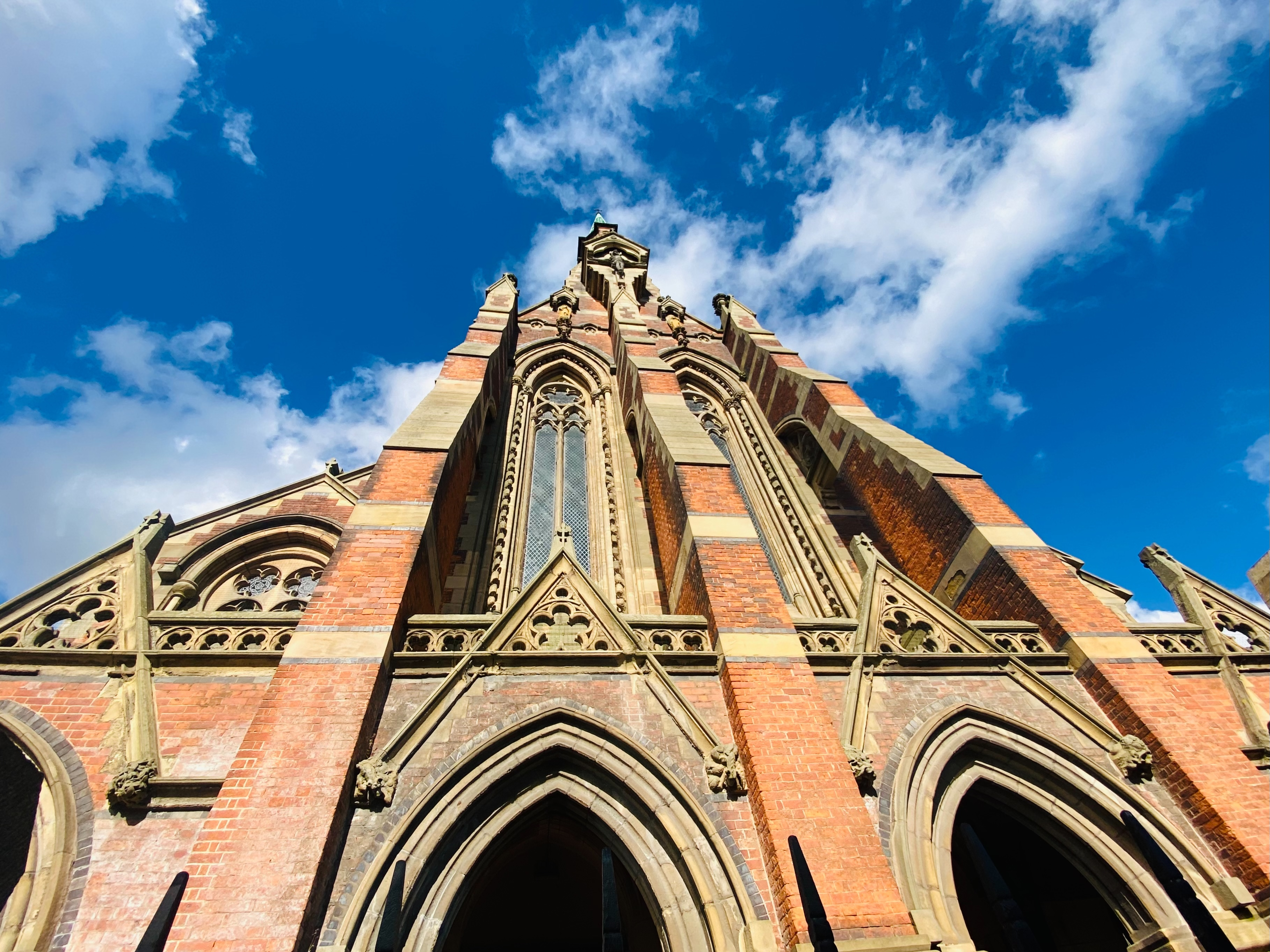
Narthex arches and south front flying buttresses

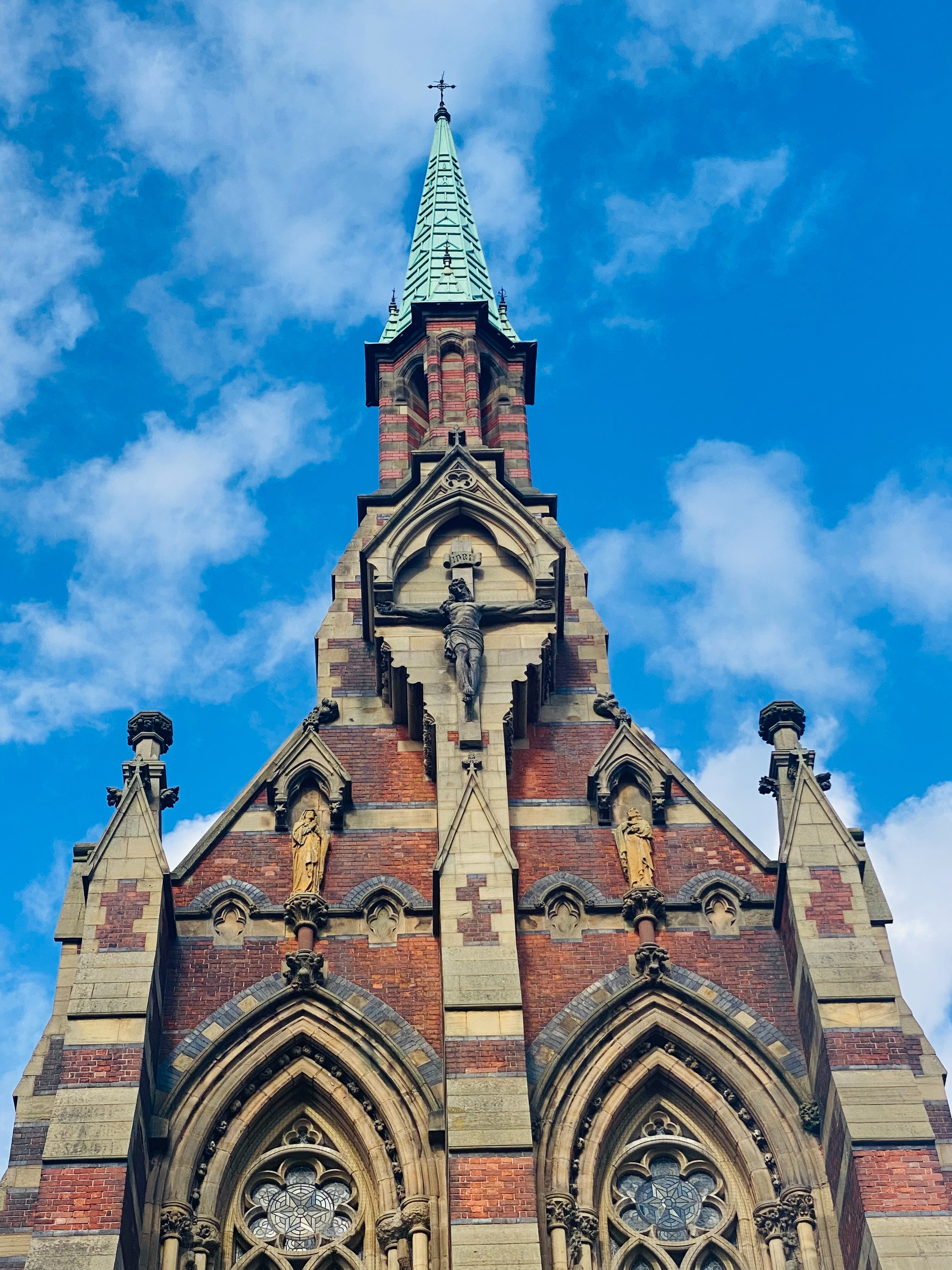
The south front crucifix

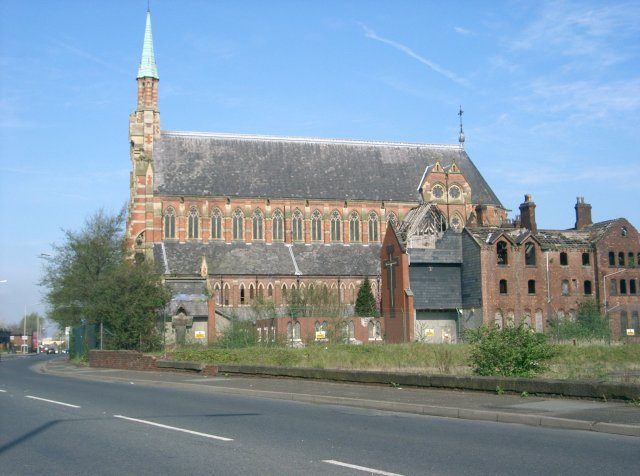
The derelict monastery in 2005 with Spashett's fire-damaged wing prior to demolition

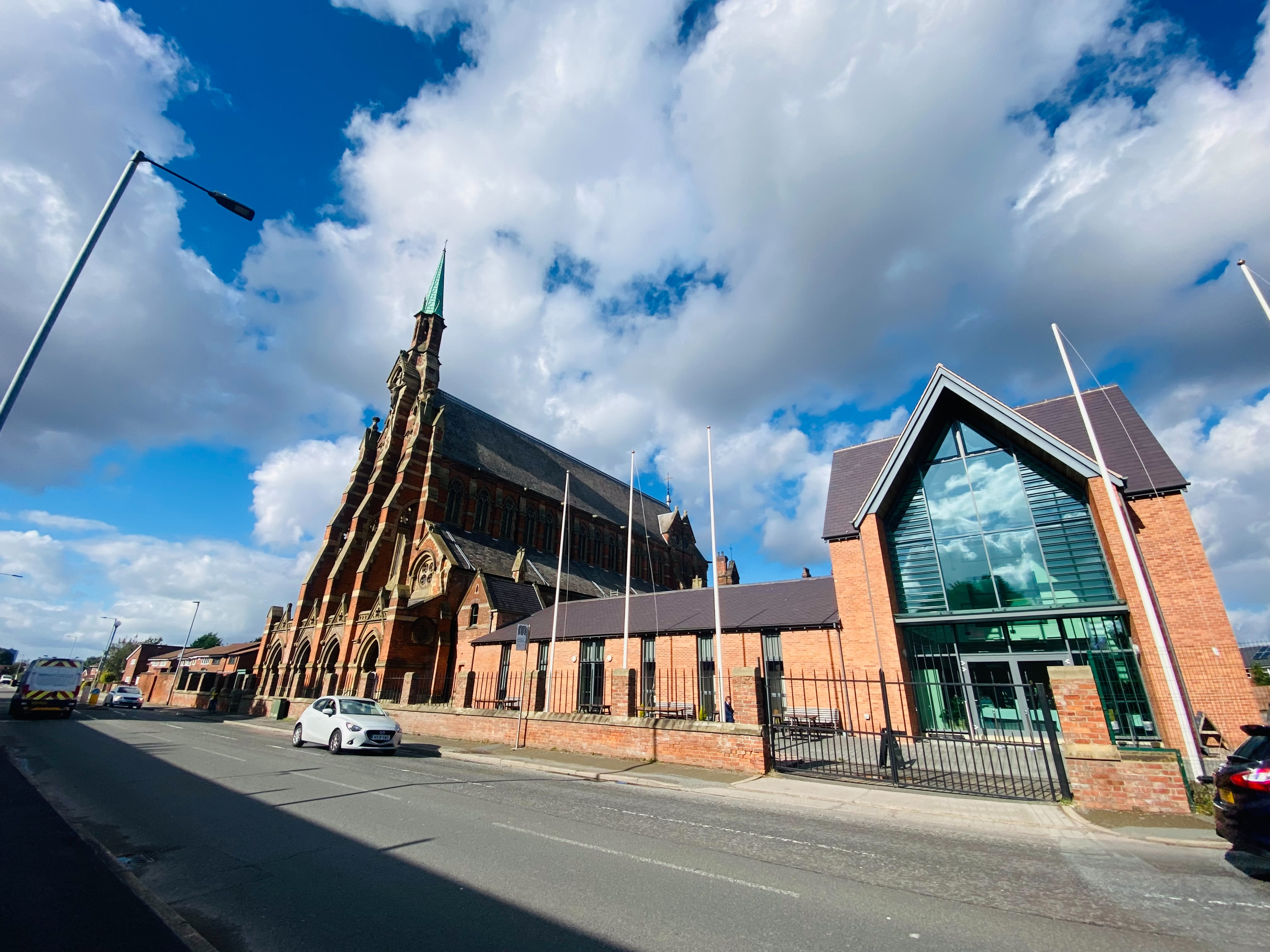
The 2016 Welcome Wing by Eco Arc

=== Interior ===
The interior is dominated by the 13-bay nave with east and west aisles and lined by buttresses, with each bay pierced by lancet windows. At the north end, the chancel is lit by large dormer windows high in the roof which focus sunlight on the high altar. Behind the altar is a tall reredos designed by the architect's half-brother, Peter Paul Pugin. The stained glass windows were designed by Ralph Bolton Edmundson.

Placed on 40-foot-high (12 m) plinths in between the nave bays is a series of 12 life-size French limestone statues of Franciscan saints. After the church fell derelict in the 1980s, many of the internal fixtures and furnishings were removed by property developers, including the statues known as the Saints.. A local historian spotted them in a Sotheby's catalogue in 1994 listed as "garden ornaments", and the statues were purchased by Manchester City Council. After they had been held in storage for 16 years they were restored over a period of eight months and finally hoisted back to their original positions in 2012.

The saints depicted are:

- St Clare of Assisi
- St Louis of Toulouse
- St Berard Nobleman
- St Elizabeth of Hungary
- St Leonard of Port Maurice
- St Didacus Penitent
- St Ivo of Brittany
- St Peter of Alcantara
- Saint Louis, King of France
- St Bernadine of Siena
- St Bonaventure
- St Anthony of Padua
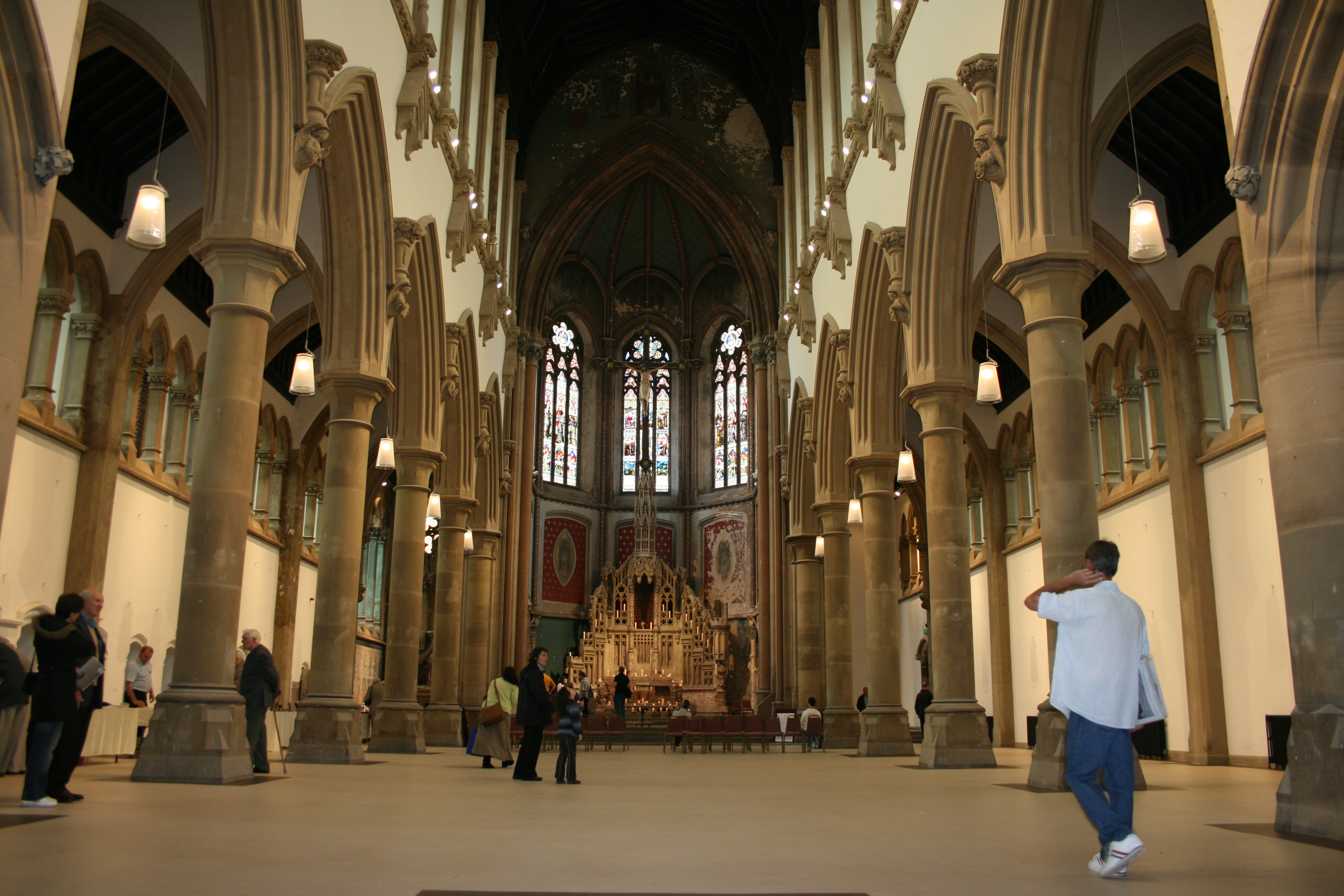
The nave in 2007

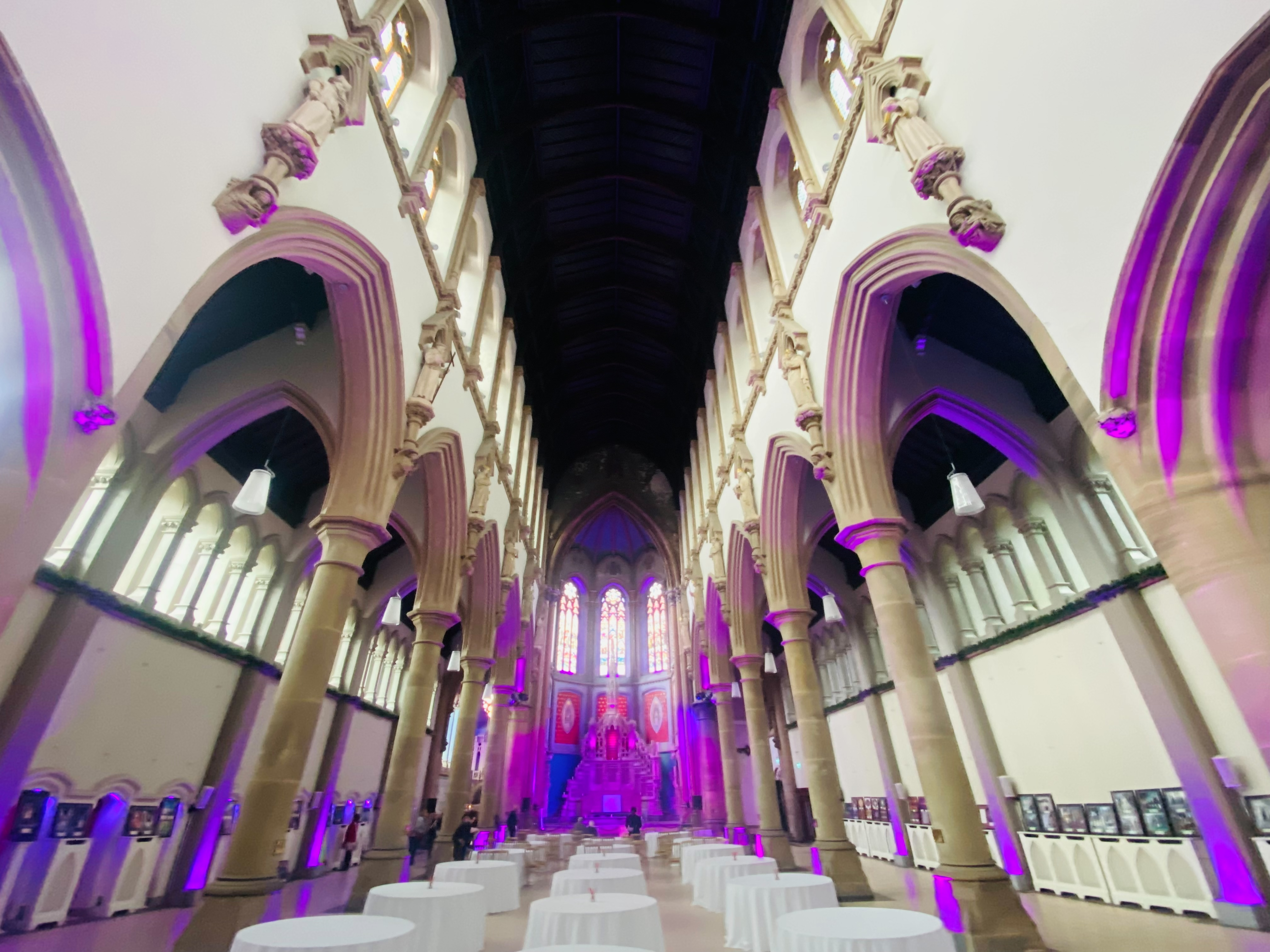
The nave in 2021

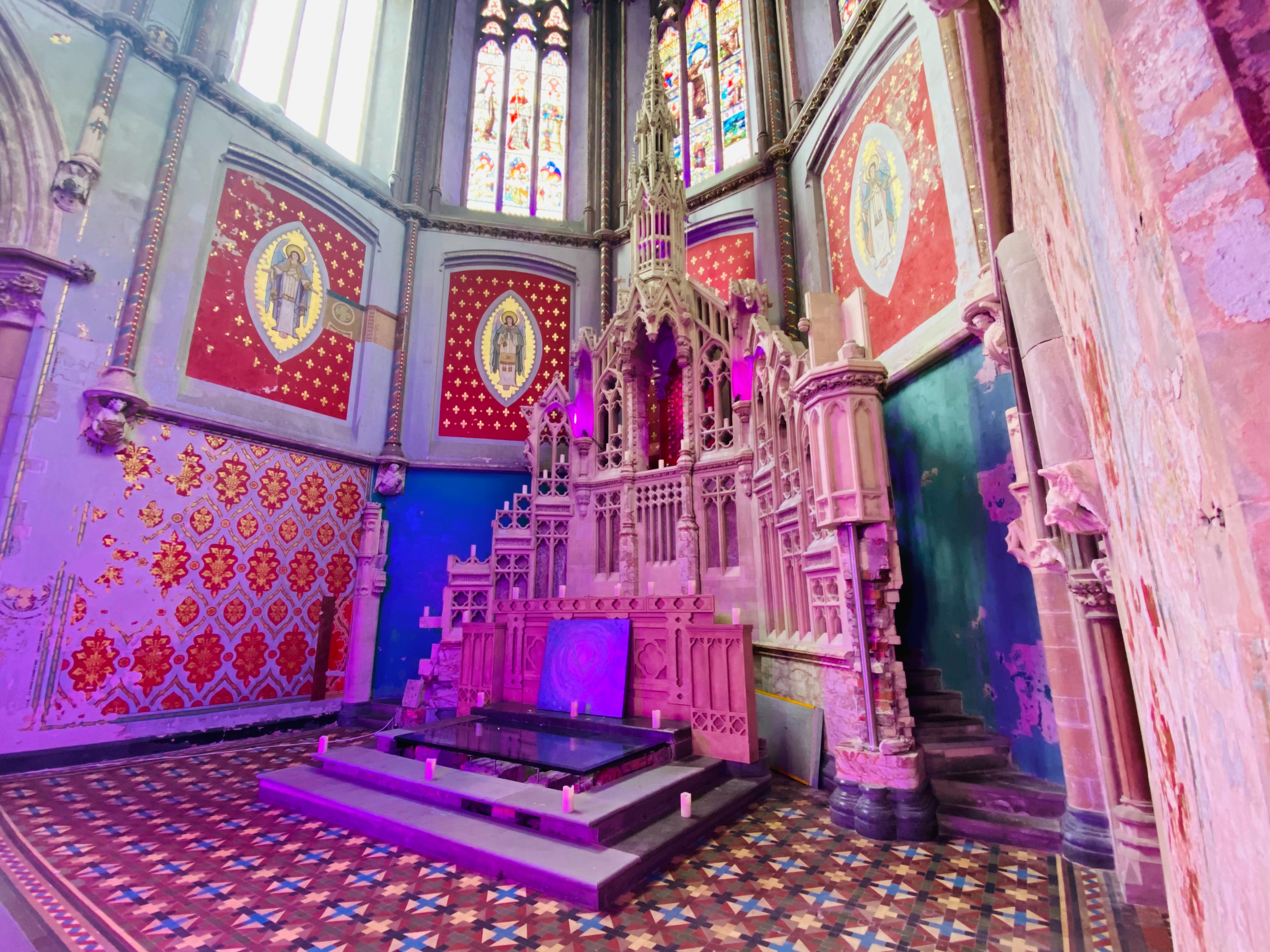
Peter Paul Pugin's ornate high altar

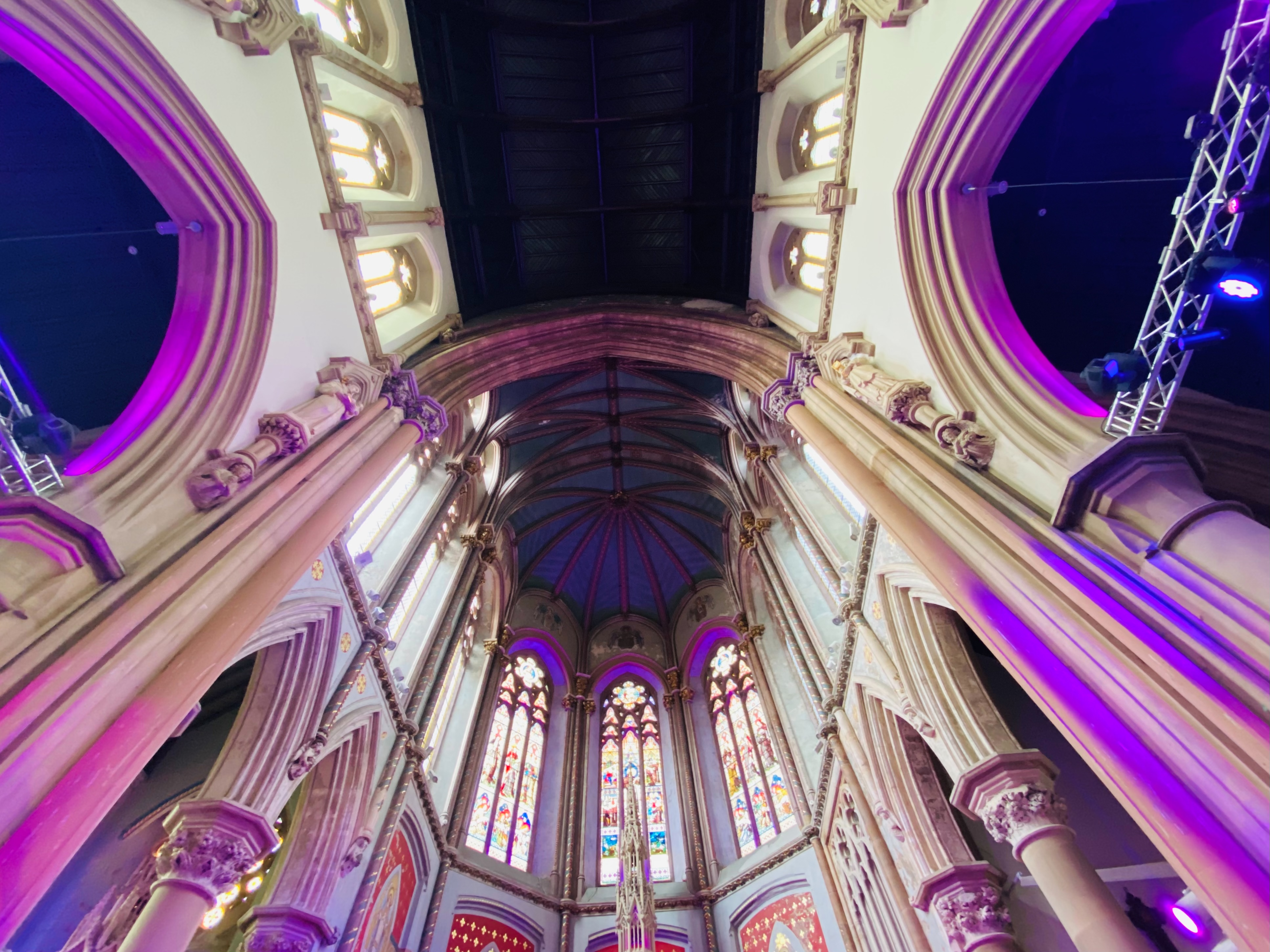
The polygonal apse with stained-glass windows by Ralph Bolton Edmundson

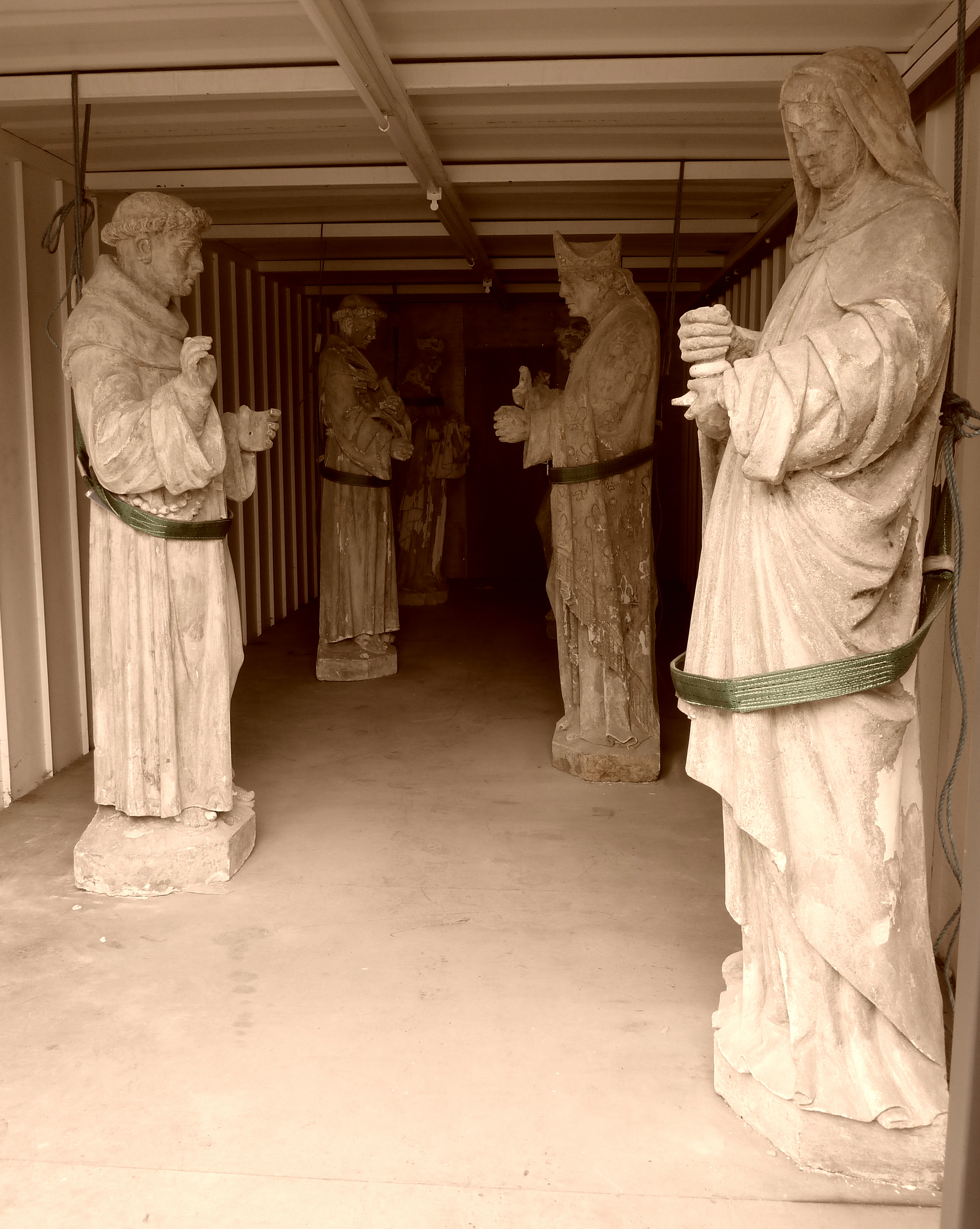
Statues of Franciscan Saints in storage prior to being reinstated in the nave

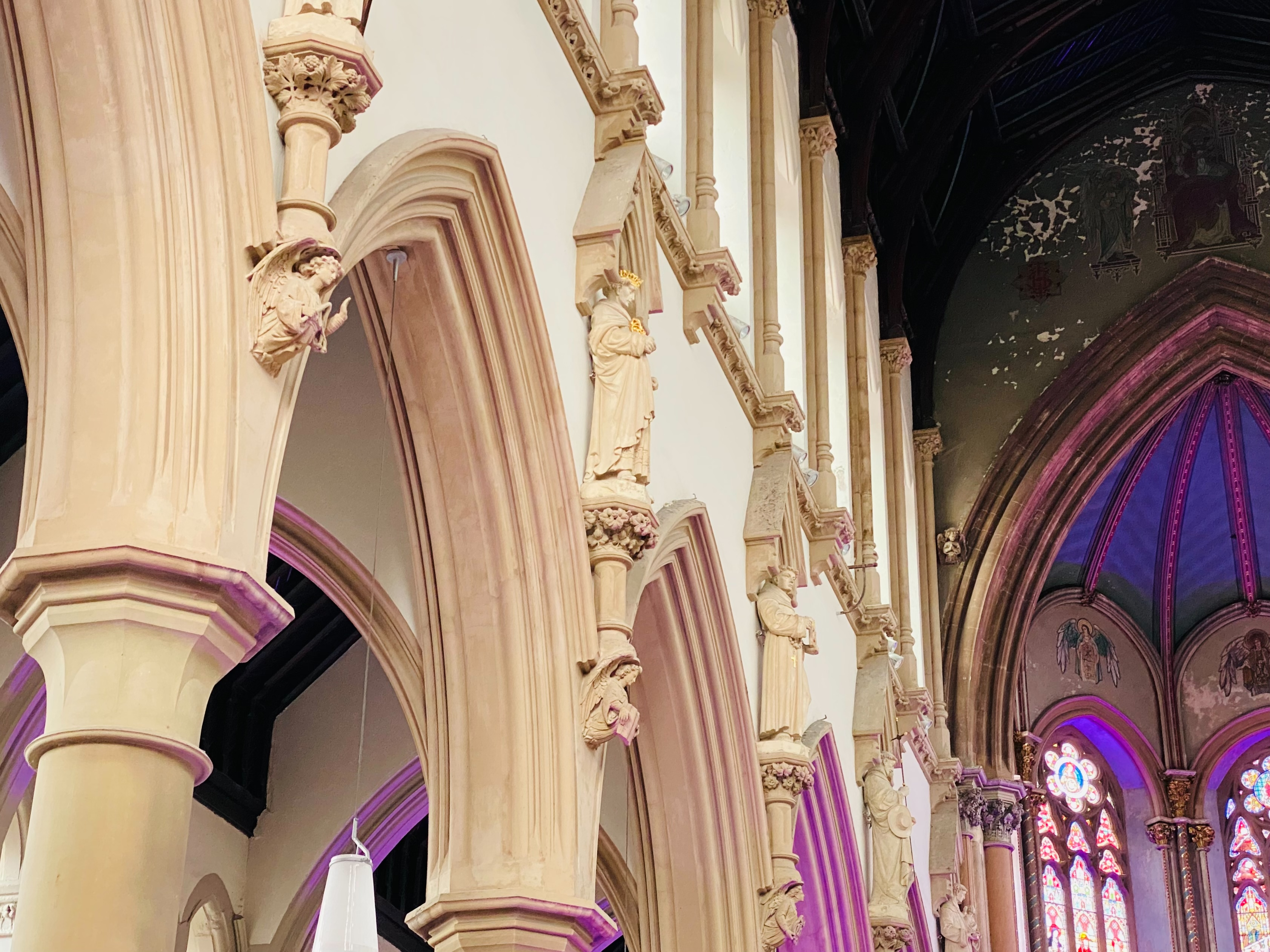
Statues of Franciscan Saints reinstated in the nave

== See also ==
- Grade II* listed buildings in Greater Manchester
- List of churches in Greater Manchester
- List of monastic houses in England
- List of monastic houses in Greater Manchester
- Listed buildings in Manchester-M18
