= Peacock Mausoleum =

Memorial in Manchester, England

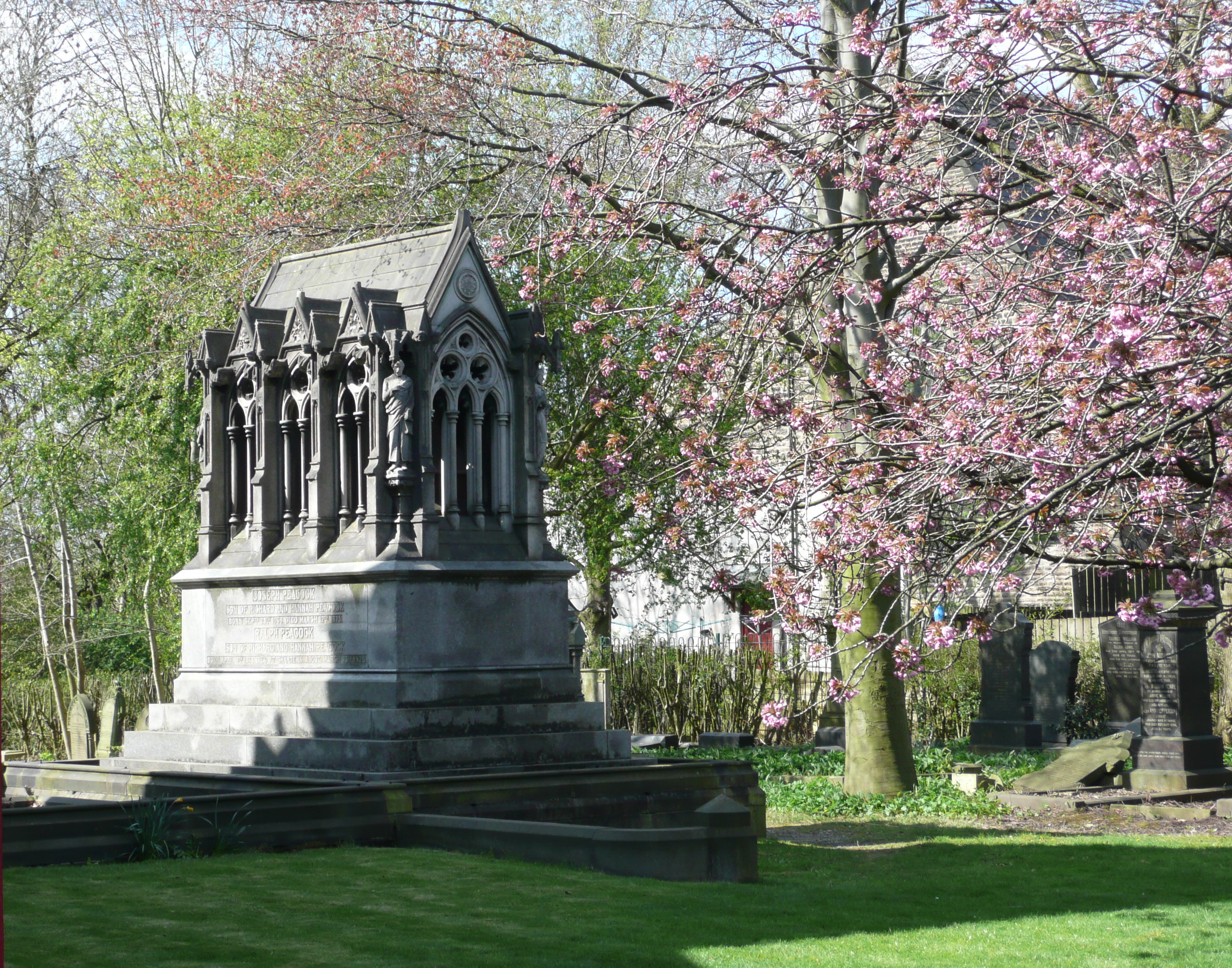

General information
- Type: Mausoleum
- Architectural style: Victorian
- Location: Gorton, Manchester
- Coordinates: 53.4601°N 2.1688°W
- Year(s) built: c. 1876
- Governing body: Church

Design and construction
- Architect(s): Thomas Worthington
- Designations

Listed Building – Grade II*
- Official name: Peacock mausoleum to west of Brookfield Unitarian Church
- Designated: 3 October 1974
- Reference no.: 1218905

The Peacock Mausoleum is a Victorian Gothic memorial to Richard Peacock (1820–1889), engineer and Liberal MP for Manchester, and to his son, Joseph Peacock. It is situated in the cemetery of Brookfield Unitarian Church in Gorton, Manchester. The mausoleum was designed by the prolific Manchester architect Thomas Worthington. It was listed Grade II* on the National Heritage List for England on 3 October 1974.

Nikolaus Pevsner's The Buildings of England describes the memorial as "a large three-bay shrine of white stone. Steep roof and statues at the corners – an engineer, blacksmith, draughtsman and architect, supposedly a portrayal of Worthington himself." Peacock, a partner in the locomotive engineering firm of Beyer, Peacock & Company also paid for the construction of the Brookfield Unitarian Church.

== See also ==
- Listed buildings in Manchester-M18
- Grade II* listed buildings in Greater Manchester
