= John Higson (antiquary) =

English antiquary and topographer (1825–1871)

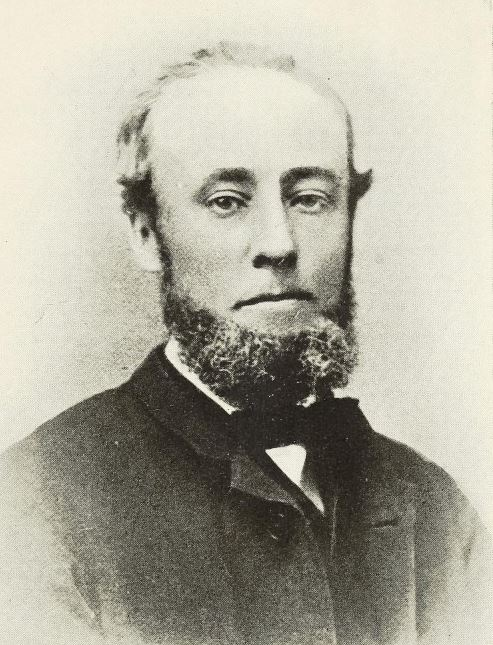
- Born: 1825
- Died: 1871 (aged 45–46)
- Occupation: Antiquarian

John Higson (25 July 1825 – 13 December 1871) was an English antiquary and topographer associated with Gorton, Droylsden and Lees (Lancashire). Employed by the Springhead Cotton Spinning Company, he produced local-historical writing alongside full-time work; he wrote in a letter that, despite twelve-and-a-half-hour shifts as a secretary (Monday to Friday, with a half-day on Saturday), he “managed to do a good deal of writing”.

== Life ==
Higson was born at Whiteley Farm, Gorton, on 25 July 1825, and was baptised at the Manchester Collegiate Church on 30 October 1825. A contemporary obituary described him as the son of poor parents who received little formal education, and as largely self-taught.

For some years he lived in Droylsden, and later at Lees (near Oldham). At the time of his death he was employed by the Springhead Cotton Spinning Company (described in the local press as a cashier). He was active in local civic life, including support for the Droylsden Mechanics’ Institute and work at Leesfield Church.

Higson died at Lees on 13 December 1871, after a sudden collapse at home; heart disease was reported as the cause. The local press reported that he left a widow and seven children. (Crofton later recorded six sons and two daughters, with one son dying in infancy.)

== Writing ==
Higson began publishing local history in the early 1850s, including The Gorton Historical Recorder (1852). He also produced a history of Droylsden and remained closely involved in local newspaper culture; an attempt to launch a Droylsden paper “on liberal-conservative lines” failed.

From the mid-1850s he contributed articles, often on local history and antiquities, to the Ashton Weekly Reporter under the signature “H”. At his death he was compiling a Glossary of Lancashire Idioms (unpublished). Crofton later credited him with further unpublished work, including a projected history of Lees and a dialect glossary, and noted that he wrote “some hundreds of newspaper articles”.

== Selected works ==
- The Gorton Historical Recorder (1852).
- Historical and Descriptive Notices of Droylsden: Past and Present (1859).
- “Boggarts and Feorin”, Notes and Queries (4th series), vol. 4 (1869), pp. 508–509.
- “Boggarts, Feorin, etc.”, Notes and Queries (4th series), vol. 5 (1870), pp. 156–157.
