= Thomas Worthington (architect) =

English architect (1826–1909)

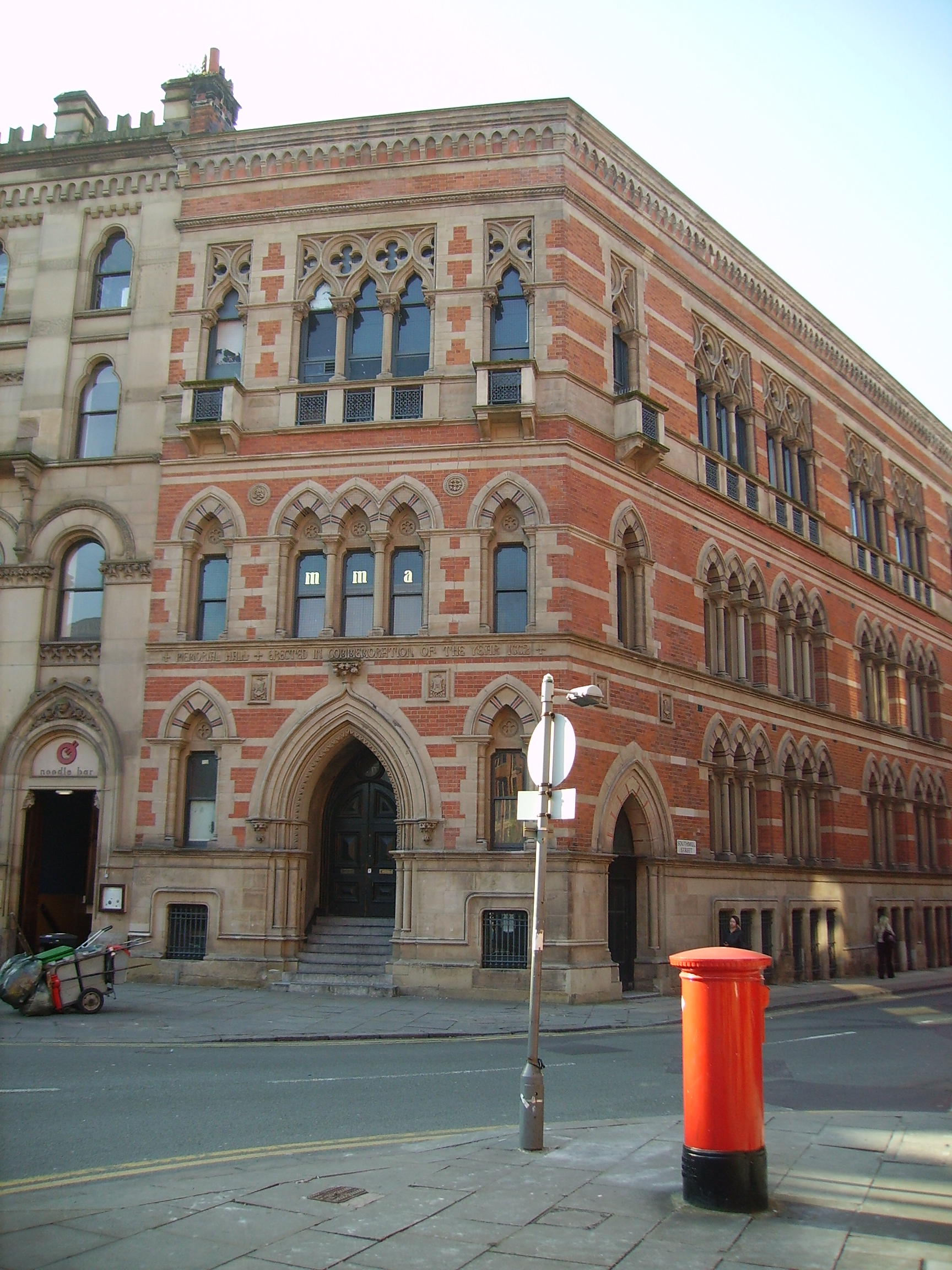
Memorial Hall, Manchester. Built in 1863. Grade II*

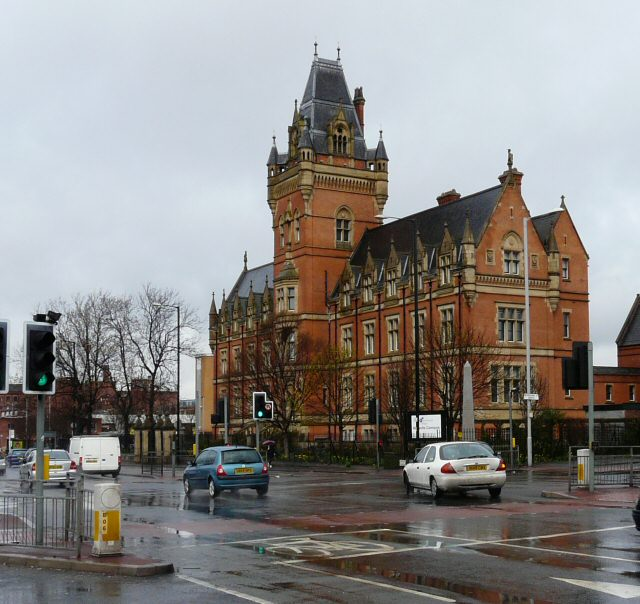
Ellen Wilkinson High School. Built in 1880. Grade II*

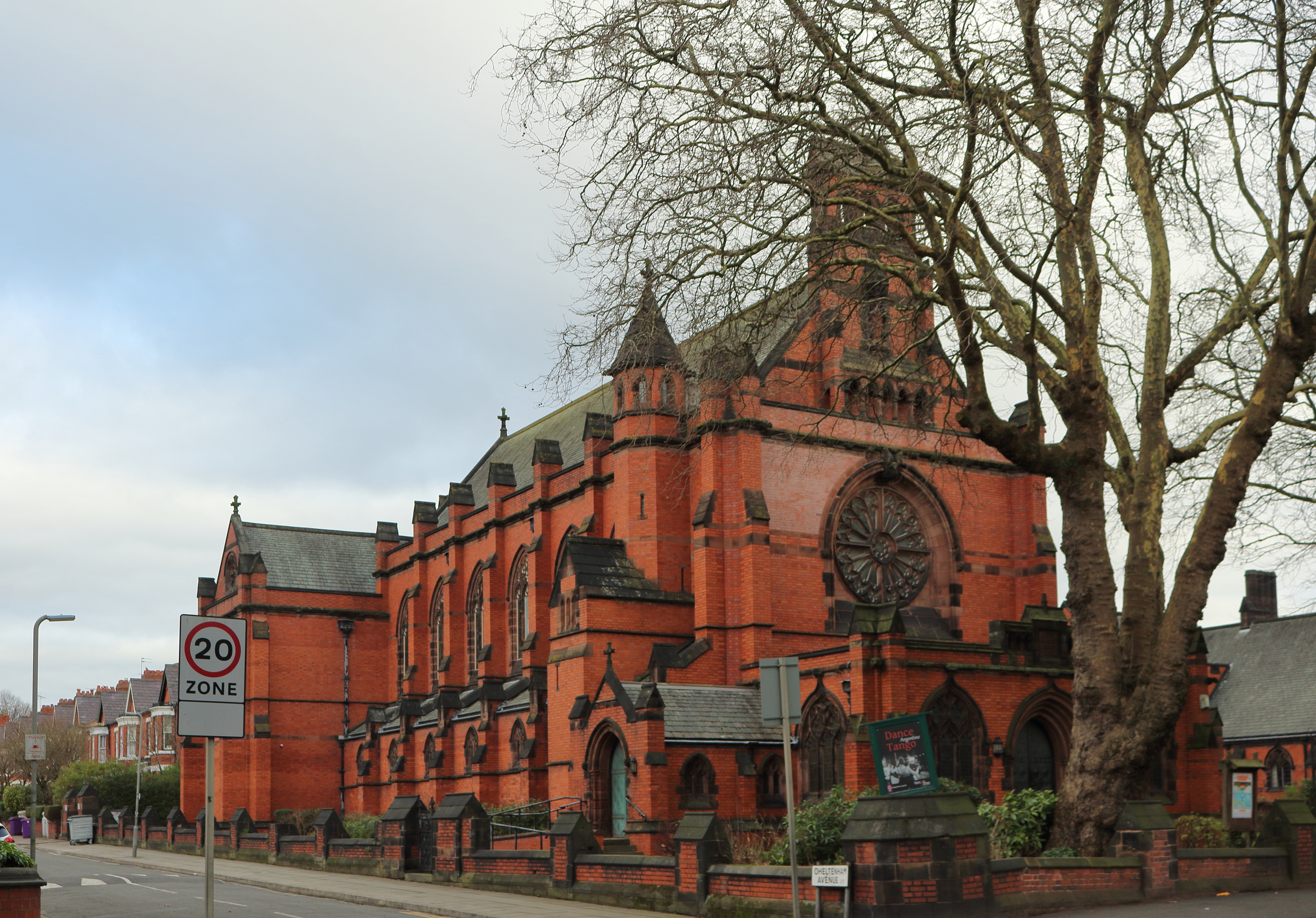
Ullet Road Unitarian Church, Liverpool. Built in 1899. Grade I.

Thomas Worthington (11 April 1826 – 9 November 1909) was an English architect of the 19th century, best known for his public buildings in and around Manchester. His preferred architectural style was Gothic Revival.

== Early life ==
Thomas Worthington was born in Crescent Parade, Crescent, Salford, Lancashire, on 11 April 1826. He was the fourth of six sons of a Salford Unitarian cotton merchant, also called Thomas, and his second wife Susanna (1792–1869). He left school, aged 14, and was articled to Henry Bowman, architect (Bowman & Crowther). Before he was 20 he had won two medals: one for a church design (Royal Society of Arts) and one for an essay on "Brick" (Royal Institute of British Architects). After completing his articles in 1847, he assisted William Tite who was building Carlisle railway station. On the suspension of this work in 1848, he went on an eight-month study tour to France, Italy and Switzerland accompanied by a friend, Henry A. Darbishire. Their journey took them through Tuscany, Latium and Campania; Worthington's notes and sketches from the trip provided him with a first-hand knowledge of Italian Gothic and Renaissance architecture, which give him inspiration for his own later work.

After returning to Manchester in October 1848, Worthington spent a short time gaining experience of quantity surveying, before opening his own architectural practice on King Street the following year.

== Social concerns ==
Worthington was strongly influenced by his Unitarian upbringing, becoming committed to social reform and joining numerous learned societies, including the Manchester Literary and Philosophical Society, the Portico Library and the Royal Manchester Institution.

Partly as a result of his social concerns, Worthington was often commissioned to design public buildings, ranging from public baths and hospitals to workhouses and Unitarian churches. These were often designed in a Gothic style, not dissimilar to that of his contemporary and rival Alfred Waterhouse.

== Projects in Manchester and district ==
- Estate Exchange, Overseers and Churchwardens Office, 46 Fountain Street (1852–1859); listed Grade II*
- Greengate Public Baths, Collier Street (1855); listed Grade II*
- Mayfield Baths (1857–1940)
- Albert Memorial (1862–1867); listed Grade I
- The Memorial Hall, Albert Square (1863–1866); listed Grade II*
- Chorlton Union Workhouse, afterwards Withington Hospital (1865)
- Prestwich Union Infirmary, afterwards Delaunays Hospital (1866–1870)
- City Police Courts (1867–1873); listed Grade II*
- The Towers, Didsbury (1868–1872); listed Grade II*. Home to Manchester industrialist Daniel Adamson from 1874, the building was later used by the British Cotton Industry Research Association from 1920, subsequently called the Shirley Institute
- Brookfield Unitarian Church, Gorton (1870); listed Grade II*
- Monton Unitarian Church, Monton, Eccles (1873–1875); listed Grade II*
- Flowery Field Church, Newton Street, Hyde (1876–1878)
- Ellen Wilkinson High School, Ardwick, formerly Nicholl's Hospital (1879–80); listed Grade II*
- Dovecote, Sale Old Hall (1880)
- Arlington House, Salford, home to Kenworthy's Chambers (1880)
- Peacock Mausoleum, Gorton (1890); listed Grade II*
- Diamond Jubilee Memorial Fountain, Albert Square (1896–97); listed Grade II
- Dunham Road Unitarian Chapel, Altrincham

== Other projects ==
- Unitarian Chapel, Liverpool; listed Grade I
- Garlands Hospital, Carlisle (originally the Cumberland and Westmorland Lunatic Asylum, 1862)
- Royal Albert Edward Infirmary, Wigan (1870)
- Sutton Oaks (a country house), London Road, Macclesfield, Cheshire (1875)
- Rosslyn Hill Unitarian Chapel, Hampstead, added north aisle and chancel (1885); listed Grade II
- Manchester College, Oxford (1889–1893); listed Grade II
- Royal Bath Hospital, Harrogate
- Royal Infirmary, Halifax
- Artisans' Dwellings 1-9 Looe Street and 1-9 How Street, Plymouth (1898); listed Grade II

== Legacy ==
His sons also trained as architects and worked in the family firm, Thomas Worthington & Sons. Hubert, later Sir Hubert Worthington (1886–1963) trained with Sir Edwin Lutyens and was professor of architecture at the Royal College of Art before becoming Slade lecturer in architecture at Oxford University. Percy Worthington (1864–1939), also worked for the firm.

Worthington is buried at the churchyard of the Victorian Gothic Brookfield Unitarian Church in Gorton, Manchester.
