= Brookfield Unitarian Church =

Church in Manchester, England

Coordinates: 53.4599°N 2.1685°W

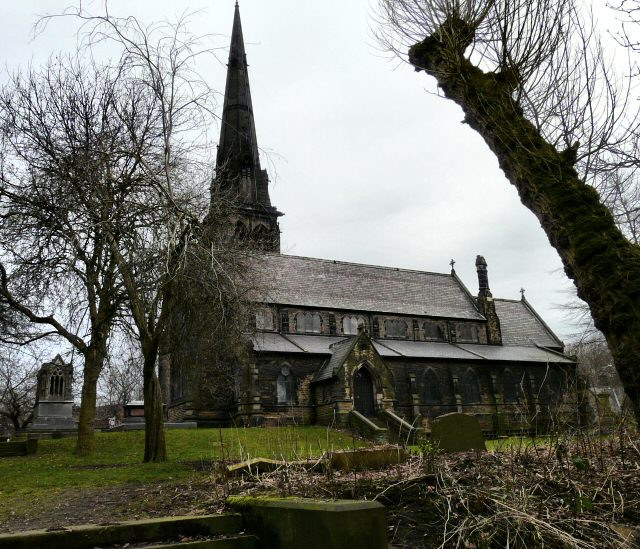
Brookfield Unitarian Church

Brookfield Unitarian Church, Gorton, Manchester, England is a Victorian Gothic church. It is a member of the General Assembly of Unitarian and Free Christian Churches, the umbrella body for British Unitarians.

== History ==
Brookfield Unitarian Church was built between 1869 and 1871 to replace the Gorton Chapel, which stood on the same ground. It was commissioned by Richard Peacock (1820–1889), engineer and Liberal MP for Manchester, and designed by the prolific Manchester architect Thomas Worthington. The church cost Peacock £12,000. It was designated a Grade II* listed building on 3 October 1974. The churchyard lodges and the Sunday School are also listed buildings. The church steeple contains a peal of eight bells, all named after members of the Peacock family.

Nikolaus Pevsner's The Buildings of England describes the church as "very large and strikingly-prosperous looking. Stone, Early English style, with a north-west steeple. The church has a bold, simple, and perfect Ecclesiological interior." The church, and its graveyard, have suffered much from vandalism in recent years.

Peacock, a partner in the locomotive engineering firm of Beyer, Peacock & Company is buried in the cemetery of the church, along with members of his family, in the Peacock Mausoleum, also by Thomas Worthington.

== Gorton Chapel ==
The Church was built on top of the Gorton Chapel, which was established in 1703. There is a stone memorial to the ministers of the Chapel in the church. A notable member of the church was Samuel Birch. The Old Chapel graveyard remains.

== See also ==
- Listed buildings in Manchester-M18
- Dissenting Gothic, architectural style
