= Richard Peacock =

Engineer and politician from United Kingdom (1820 - 1889)

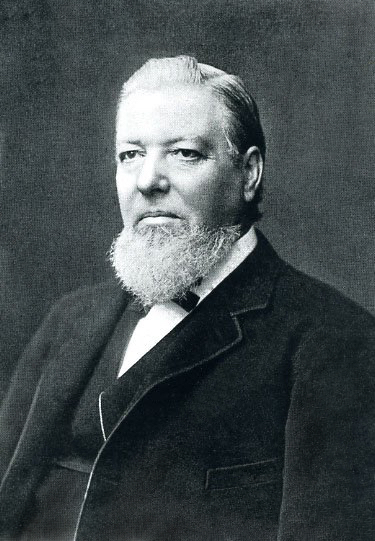
Richard Peacock

Richard Peacock (9 April 1820 – 3 March 1889) was an English engineer, one of the founders of locomotive manufacturer Beyer, Peacock and Company. He was later a Member of Parliament.

== Early life and education ==
Born in Swaledale, Yorkshire, Richard Peacock was educated at Leeds Grammar School. At 14 he left to be apprenticed at Fenton, Murray and Jackson in Leeds.

== Career ==
Reflecting a burgeoning industry that had barely started a decade beforehand, the Leeds and Selby Railway Company appointed Peacock in 1838, aged 18, as a locomotive superintendent. When the firm was acquired by the York and North Midland Railway in 1840, he worked under Daniel Gooch at Swindon, but left reputedly to escape Gooch's wrath. In 1841 he became the locomotive superintendent of the Sheffield, Ashton-under-Lyne and Manchester Railway, which became the Manchester, Sheffield and Lincolnshire Railway Company from 1847. In this role he was responsible for founding the Gorton locomotive works for the company. He left shortly before they were completed in 1848.

In 1847, Peacock was present with Charles Beyer at a meeting at Lickey Incline which it is generally acknowledged gave birth to the Institution of Mechanical Engineers. George Stephenson was elected as first president and Charles Beyer as a vice president. Peacock became a member of the Institution of Civil Engineers in 1849.

Having also had dealings with Charles Beyer through acquiring locomotives from Sharp Brothers, he joined Beyer in 1853 to establish Beyer, Peacock and Company to manufacture steam locomotives.

He was elected to membership of the Manchester Literary and Philosophical Society on 29 November 1881.

== Politics and religion ==
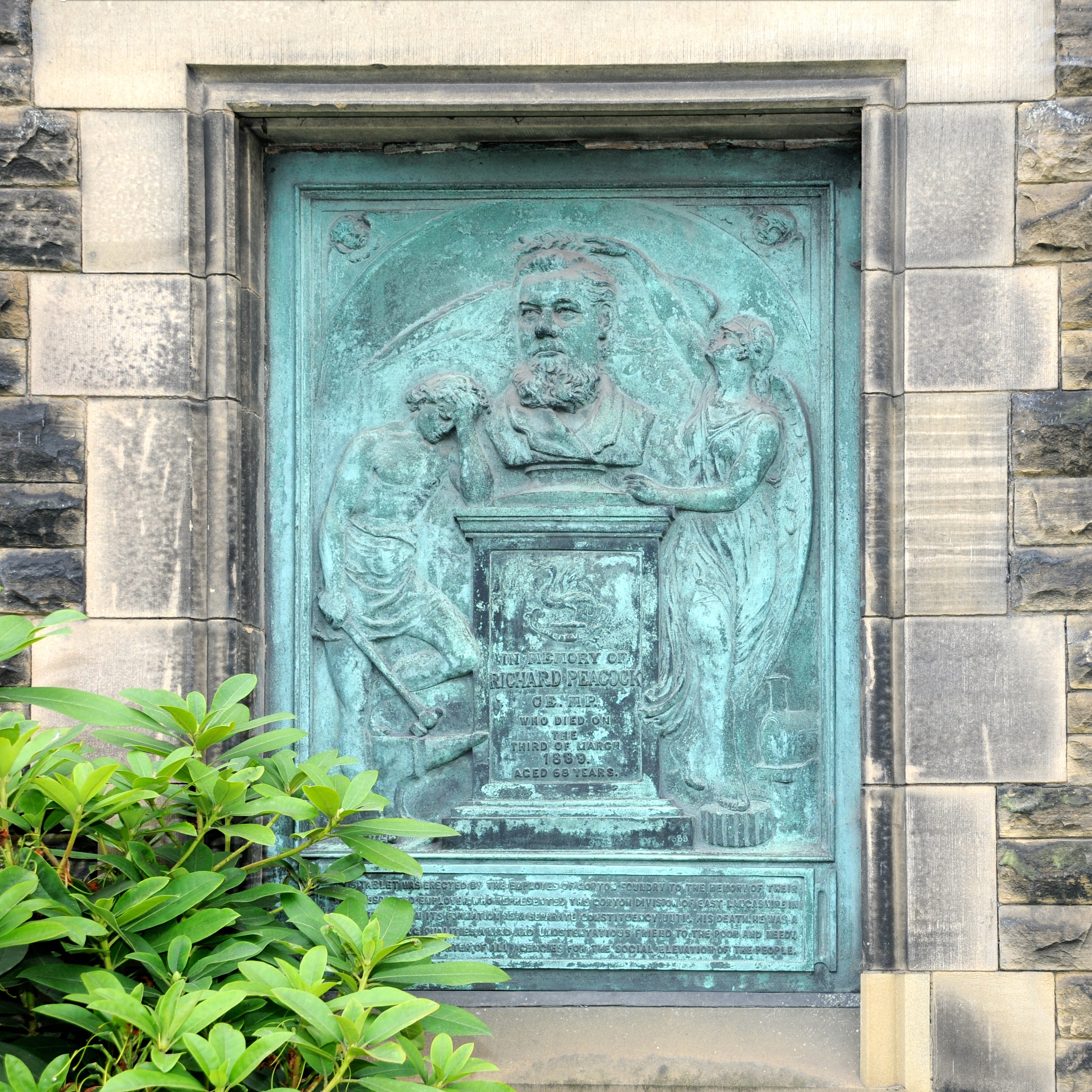
The memorial tablet to Richard Peacock at Brookfield Unitarian Church, Gorton, describes his parliamentary career and testifies to his being "a kind and unostentatious friend to the poor and needy"

From the 1885 general election until his death in 1889, Peacock was Liberal Party Member of Parliament (MP) for Gorton division of Lancashire. He was a Unitarian, and one of his contributions to the community in Gorton was the construction of Brookfield Unitarian Church, which stands today. Its bells are named after his children.

Emily Faithfull, the Victorian printer and women's rights activist, dedicated the English edition of her book Three Visits To America to her "Friend Richard Peacock Esq of Gorton Hall" in 1884. During his period in parliament Peacock was in favour of Home Rule, of the reform of the House of Lords, the disestablishment and disendowment of the Church of England, and the establishment of local self-government.

== Family ==
Peacock was the son of Ralph Peacock, a mines supervisor from Swaledale, Yorkshire, and Dorothy Robinson. He was married twice, firstly to Hannah Crowther, and secondly to Frances Littlewood. At the time of his death his eldest son, Colonel Ralph Peacock VD (1838–1928) of the part-time Manchester Artillery Volunteers, succeeded him at Gorton Foundry. Of his daughters the eldest, Jane Peacock (1855–1928), married William Taylor Birchenough JP, a silk manufacturer who was elder brother of Sir Henry Birchenough and son of John Birchenough. Peacock's grandson, Richard Peacock Birchenough, married Dorothy Grace Godsal, daughter of Philip Thomas Godsal, the inventor of the Godsal anti tank rifle. Peacock's youngest daughter, Eugenie, married George P. Dawson, who succeeded Colonel Peacock as managing director on the formation of the incorporated Beyer, Peacock and Company Limited in 1902. Colonel Ralph Peacock died without issue, as did Richard Peacock's only other surviving son, Frederick William Peacock (1858–1924).

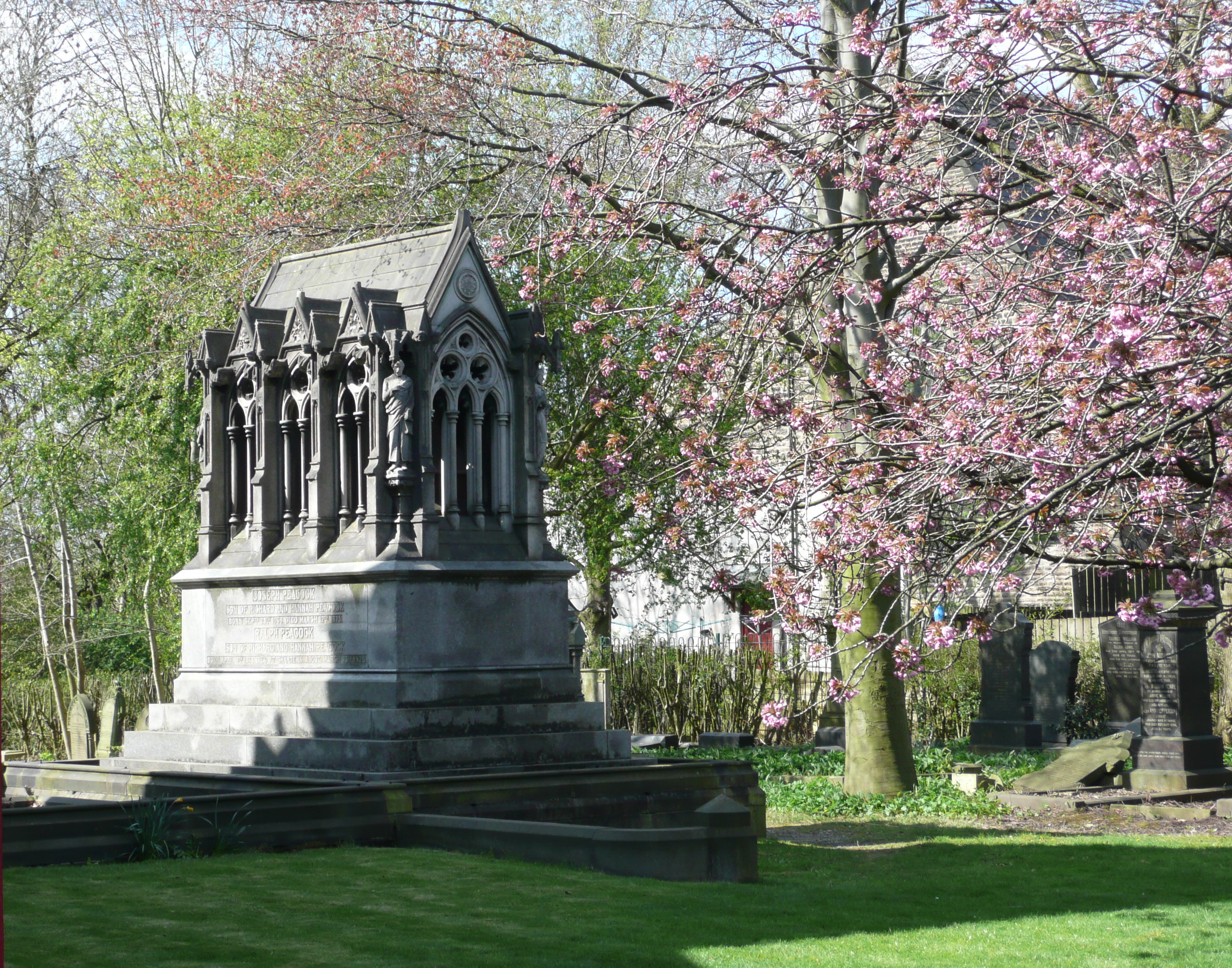
The Peacock Mausoleum at Brookfield Unitarian Church

Richard Peacock died in Manchester at the age of 68. He is buried in the Peacock Mausoleum in the graveyard of his Brookfield Unitarian Church. The graveyard also holds the remains of Ralph Peacock and an earlier deceased son, Joseph Peacock.

== Sources ==
- Leigh Rayment's Historical List of MPs
- Beyer Peacock Quarterly Review July 1927
- Who's Who of British Parliament Volume 2 1886-1918

== Bibliography ==
- Ahrons, L.E. (1927) The British Steam Railway Locomotive 1825–1925
- Obituary - The Engineer, 8 March 1889.

Business positions
Preceded by No predecessor	Locomotive Superintendent of the Manchester, Sheffield and Lincolnshire Railway; 1847–1854	Succeeded by William Grindley Craig
Parliament of the United Kingdom
New constituency	Member of Parliament for Gorton; 1885 – 1889	Succeeded by Sir William Mather
