= Gorton =

Area of Manchester, England

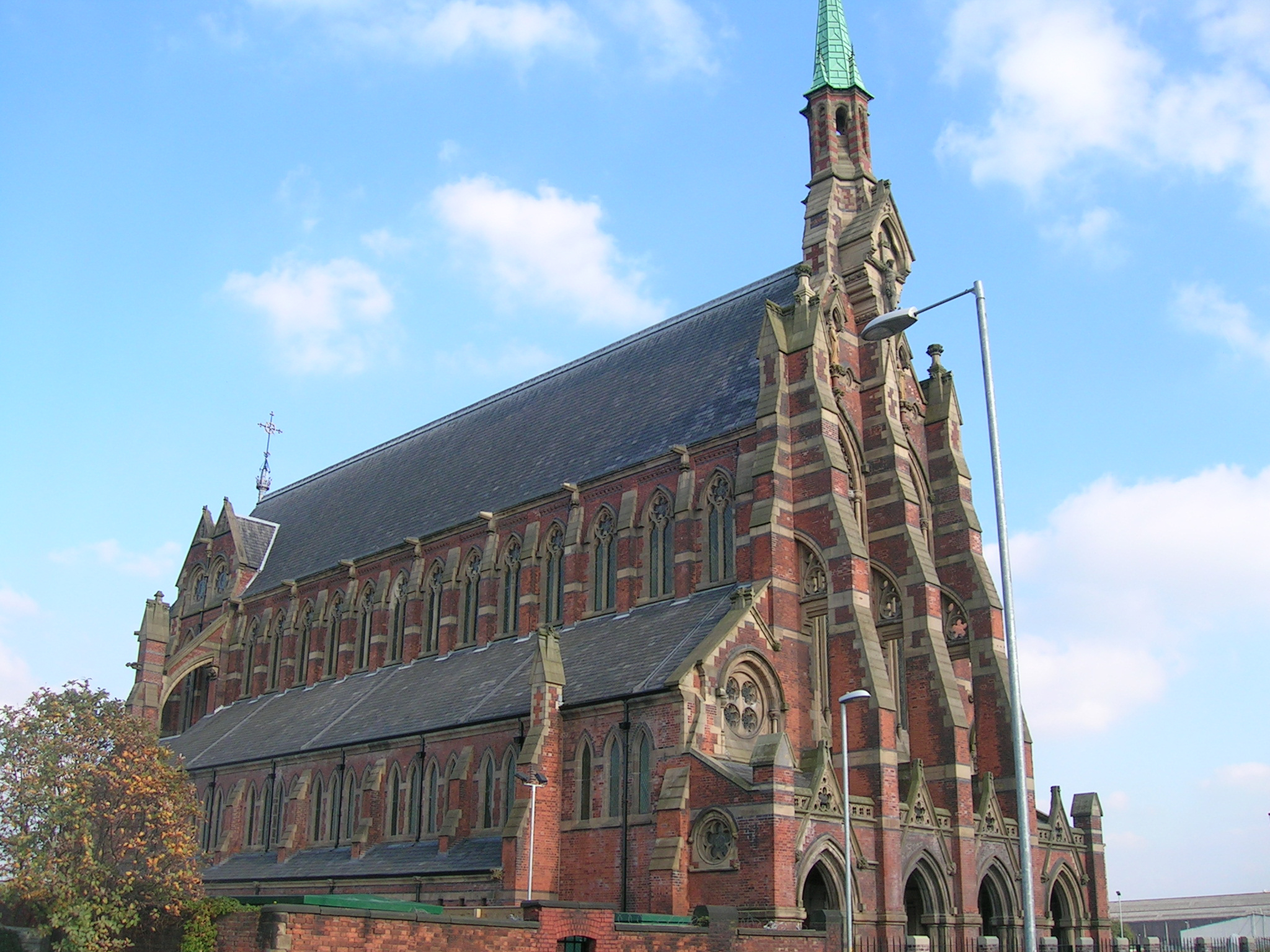
- Gorton Monastery

- Location within Greater Manchester
- Population: 36,055 (2011)
- OS grid reference: SJ885965
- Metropolitan borough: Manchester
- Metropolitan county: Greater Manchester
- Region: North West
- Country: England
- Sovereign state: United Kingdom
- Post town: MANCHESTER
- Postcode district: M18
- Dialling code: 0161
- Police: Greater Manchester
- Fire: Greater Manchester
- Ambulance: North West
- UK Parliament: Gorton and Denton

Gorton is an area of Manchester, in Greater Manchester, England; it lies to the south-east of the city centre. The population at the 2011 census was 36,055. Neighbouring areas include Levenshulme, Openshaw and Denton. Gorton Monastery, a 19th-century High Victorian Gothic former Franciscan friary is a major landmark.

== History ==
According to local folklore, Gorton derives its name from Gore Town, due to a battle between the Saxons and Danes nearby. This has been dismissed by historians as "popular fancy". The name Gorton means "dirty farmstead", perhaps taking its name from the Gore Brook, or dirty brook, which still runs through the township today. The brook may have acquired that name because of the dirty appearance of its water, perhaps caused by discolouration due to peat or iron deposits.

Gorton was formerly a township and chapelry in the ancient parish of Manchester in the Salford hundred of Lancashire. In 1866 Gorton became a separate civil parish, from 1894 to 1909 Gorton was an urban district, on 1 October 1910 the parish was abolished and merged with South Manchester. In 1901 the parish had a population of 26,564.

Manchester City F.C. was founded as St Mark's (West Gorton) in 1880. The club was formed with the aim of binding the local community and to combat a form of gang warfare called scuttling that existed in the 1870s. The rector's daughter, Anna Connell, is widely credited as the founder, although churchwarden William Beastow is believed to be the person who played the main part in creating sporting activities for the parish. In 1875, St Mark's Cricket Club are known to have played and this evolved into the football club later in the decade. The first recorded football game was played in November 1880.

A Blackfoot Sioux chief named Charging Thunder came to Salford aged 26 as part of Buffalo Bill's Wild West Show in 1903. Like many Lakota tribesmen, Charging Thunder was an exceptional horseman and performed thrilling stunts in Buffalo Bill's show in front of huge crowds, on the site of what is now the Lowry in Salford Quays. But when the show rolled out of town, he remained in London. He married Josephine, an American horse trainer who had just given birth to their first child, Bessie and together they settled in Darwen, before moving to Gorton. His name was changed to George Edward Williams, after registering with the British immigration authorities to enable him to find work. Williams ended up as an elephant keeper at the Belle Vue Zoo. He died on 28 July 1929 from pneumonia aged fifty-two. He was buried in Gorton's cemetery.

=== Twentieth century ===
The world-famous Belle Vue Zoological Gardens, comprising a zoo, gardens, amusement park, exhibition complex and speedway stadium, was opened in 1836 in Gorton and became one of the leading attractions in the UK. The site spanned 165 acres of land and attracted over two million visitors a year. The zoo was the third-largest in the UK, and the exhibition hall held concerts from a range of national and international artists, such as Jimi Hendrix and The Rolling Stones. After 141 years, the zoo closed in 1977, with the rest of the site finally cleared for redevelopment in 1982.

Myra Hindley, convicted of taking part in the Moors Murders in 1966, grew up in Gorton. She and Ian Brady were still living in Gorton at the time of the first three Moors murders, before moving to Hattersley in 1964 when Hindley's family home was included in a local demolition programme. Brady and Hindley committed two further murders after moving from Gorton, before they were finally arrested in October 1965. Their first victim, Pauline Reade (who was murdered in July 1963 aged 16, but whose body was not found for 24 years), was a Gorton resident and a neighbour of Hindley. The third victim, Keith Bennett, whose body has never been found, was also from Gorton.

== Economy and development ==
The Industrial Revolution brought work and industry to Gorton in the form of locomotive factories, including that of Beyer, Peacock & Company. Today these sites continue to employ workers in a variety of fields, from local private businesses to national companies, including the manufacturing headquarters of Iceland. A number of retail and recreation sites are also a source of local employment for many in the area, such as the TV and film production studio, Space Studios, which employs up to 300 people. Less than three miles (five kilometres) from the centre of Manchester, Gorton is also made up of many tertiary sector workers who commute into the city.

The popular television series Shameless, which aired on Channel 4, was mainly filmed in West Gorton. The parade of shops used for filming in the initial series was built on the site of St Mark's Church, Clowes Street, the birthplace of Manchester City F.C. The area has since been demolished and redeveloped with various new social and private housing,

In 2006, Manchester City Council started a multimillion-pound redevelopment of the Gorton District Shopping Centre. The small market and retail area were demolished and work started in late 2007 to construct a new market hall and Tesco Extra hypermarket on the site. In July 2008, the new Manchester Gorton Market Hall was opened to the public. The construction of the new hypermarket and neighbouring petrol station continued, and in late October 2008, the new Tesco Extra store opened its doors for trading. Further retail outlets were developed near this site along Hyde Road, including Subway, Coral and Age UK. Regeneration works are continuing to make Gorton "an even better place to live and work". This includes the demolition of all former tower blocks and construction of new homes and parks. House prices in the area are rising as a result of this as the area is beginning to attract more trendy, urban buyers.

=== Gorton market ===
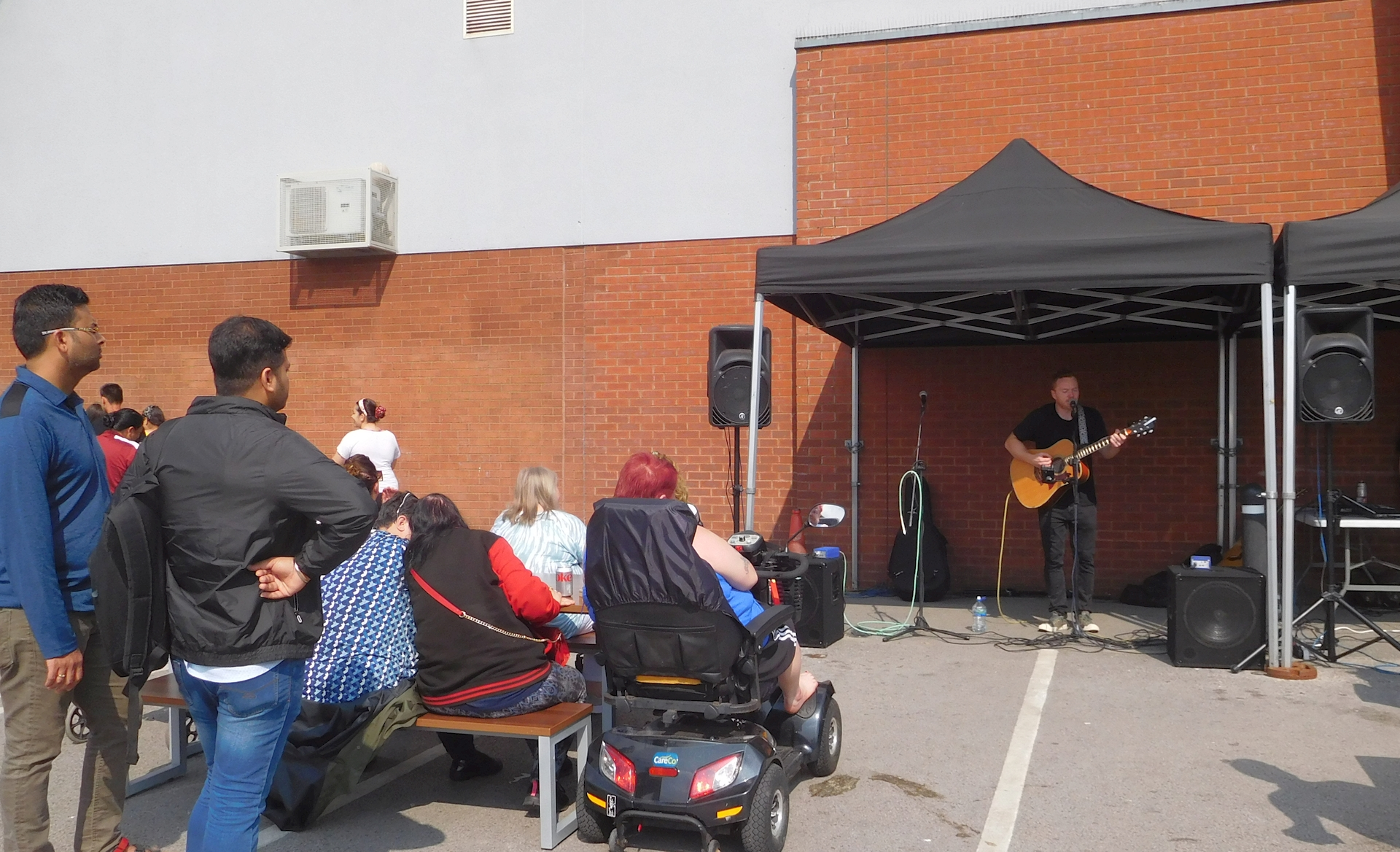
Bank Holiday Weekend entertainment

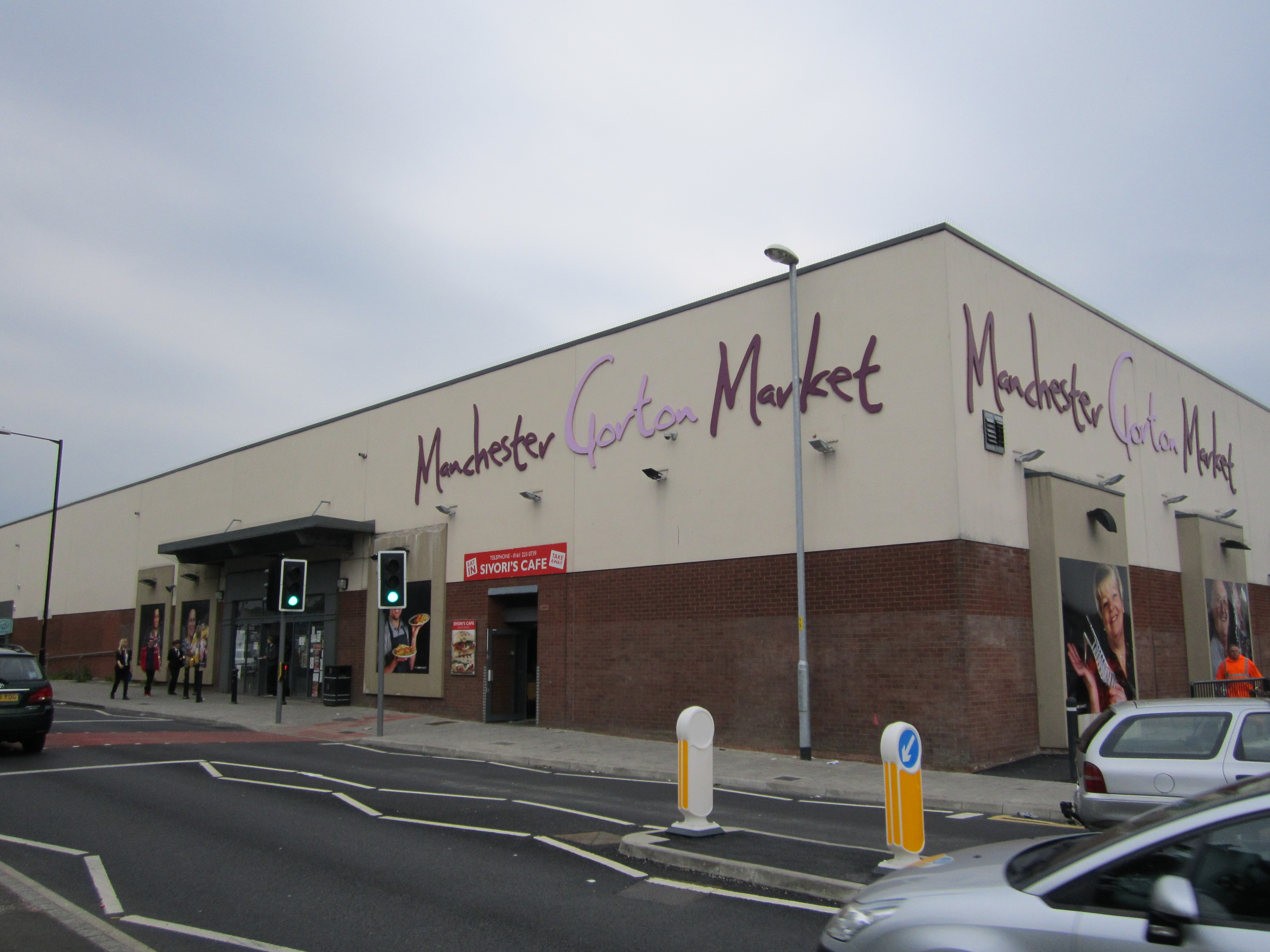
Gorton Market

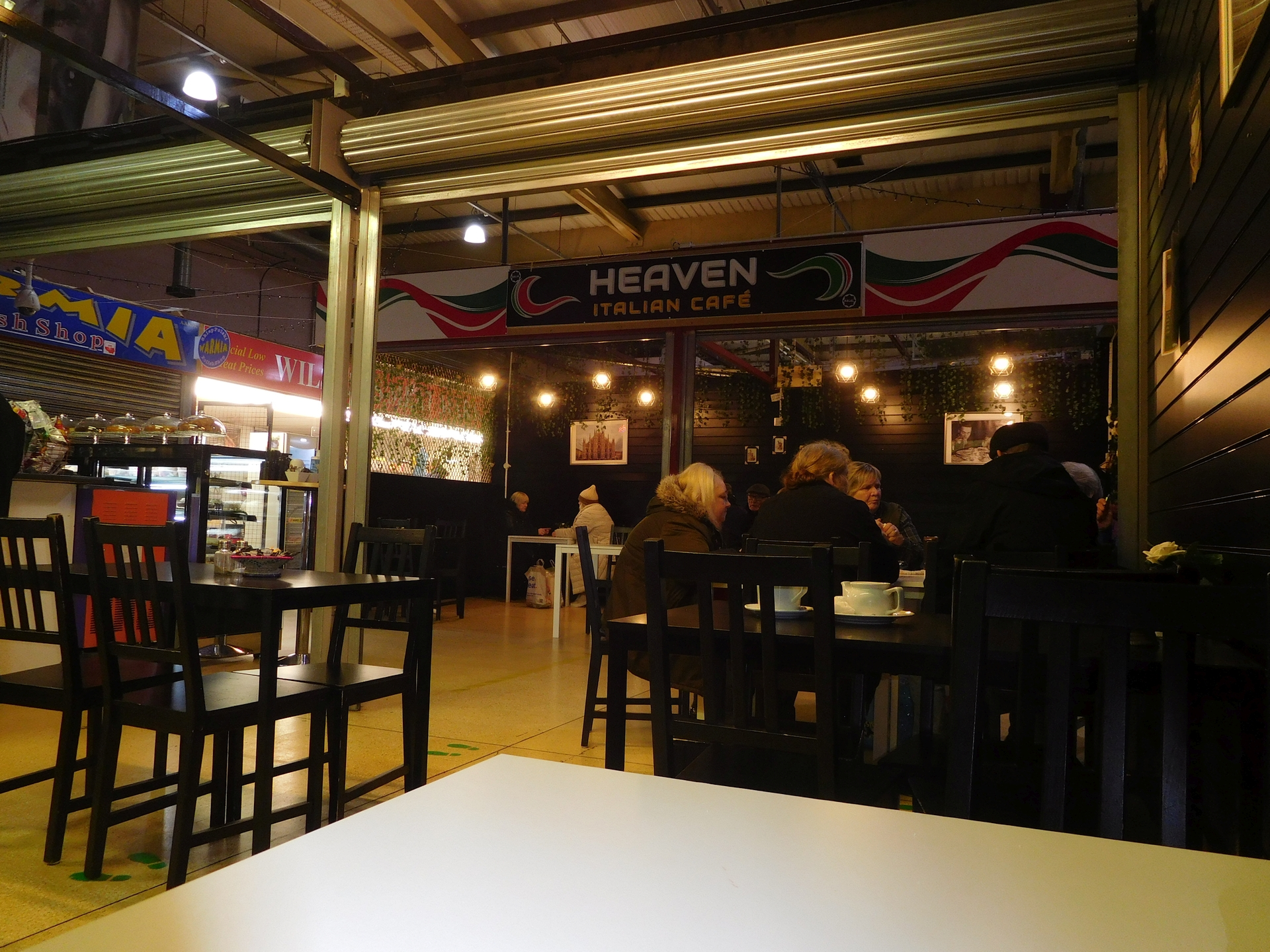
Heaven Italian Cafe

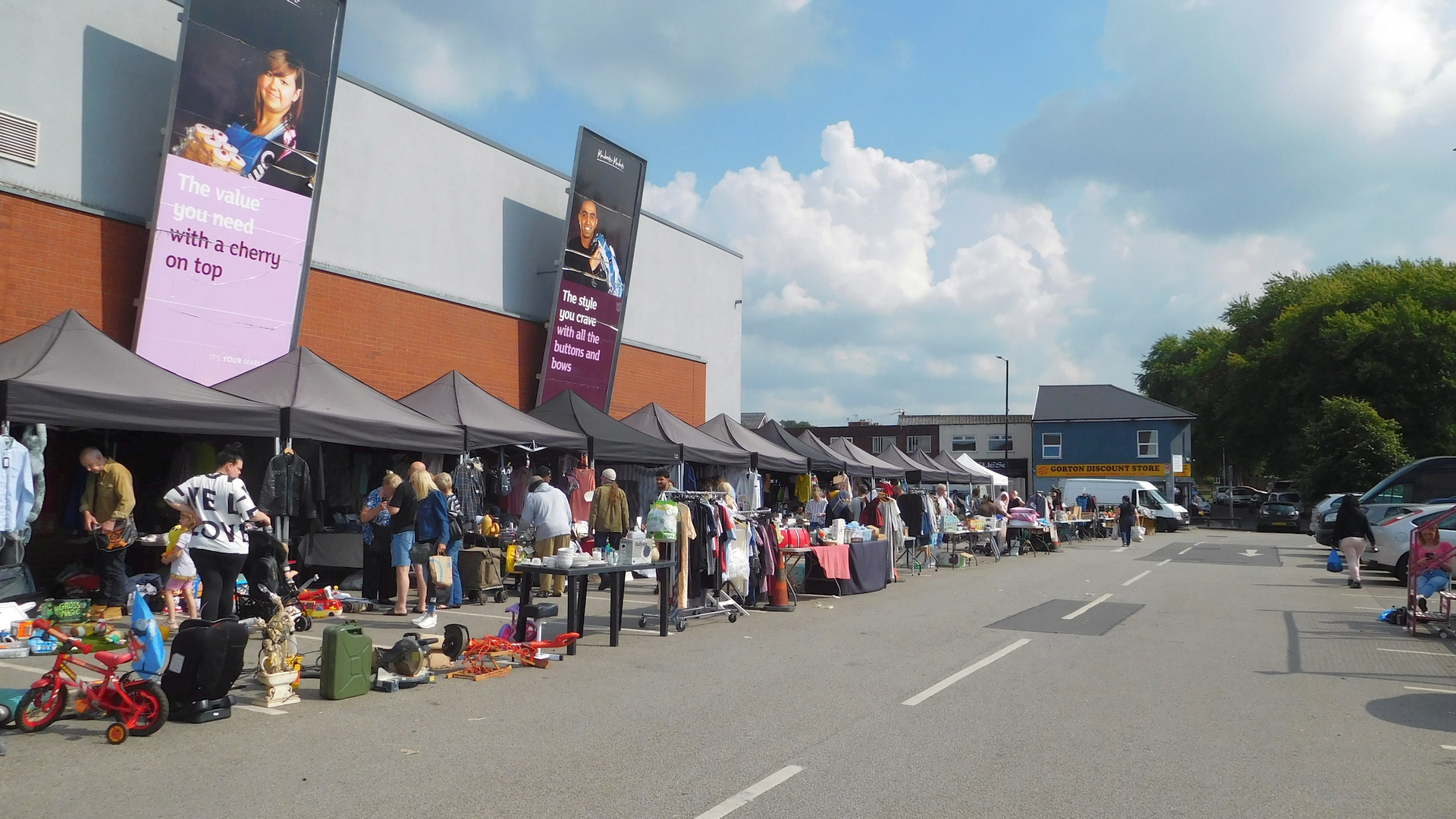
Stalls outside Gorton Market

== Geography ==
Belle Vue is a locality within Gorton, as are West Gorton, which was included in the City of Manchester in 1890, whereas the remainder of Gorton wasn't until 1909, thanks largely to the work of councillor Joseph Henry Williamson, then Chairman of Gorton Urban District Council, and Abbey Hey, mostly a residential district, but also well known locally as the location of Wright Robinson College.

The area south of the former Roman road, Hyde Road, and between Belle Vue and Reddish is a historic area in which various ancient tools and weapons have been unearthed from various historic battles that took place there. Many local placenames allude to this history, including Winning Hill, also known as Ryder Brow, a locality within Gorton that contains many topographical features, including Bottom o’ th’ Brow at the base of a valley and Gore Brook that runs through Gorton, flowing west to the river Mersey. Much of this area contains the Gore Brook Valley Conservation Area. Ryder Brow is served by Ryder Brow railway station.

Gorton also has several allotments and parks which are supported through the Gorton Horticultural Society.

== Landmarks and attractions ==
Gorton is home to Gorton Monastery, a Franciscan, 19th century High Victorian Gothic friary. This has been renovated and secularised: it was previously derelict after the friars moved out. The parish left by the Friars came under the care of the Diocese of Salford. St Francis of Assisi RC Church on Textile Street, Gorton, and Sacred Heart Church, Levenshulme Road, Gorton, now form part of the R.C. Parish of Sacred Heart and St. Francis. Other churches in Gorton which were designed by notable architects include the Brookfield Unitarian Church on Hyde Road, built by Richard Peacock and the Mount Olivet Apostolic Church (originally the Anglican church of Our Lady of Mercy and St Thomas of Canterbury) on Mount Road, which was built by Walter Tapper in 1927.

Gorton Heritage Trail is a public trail with 20 sites of interest. The trail is partly semi-rural, largely located within the Gore Brook Valley Conservation Area, and highlights various local landmarks, including ecological and topographical sites, and grade-listed monuments and buildings. The trail starts in Sunny Brow Park, and leads northwards to Debdale Park, following the reverse course of Gore Brook.

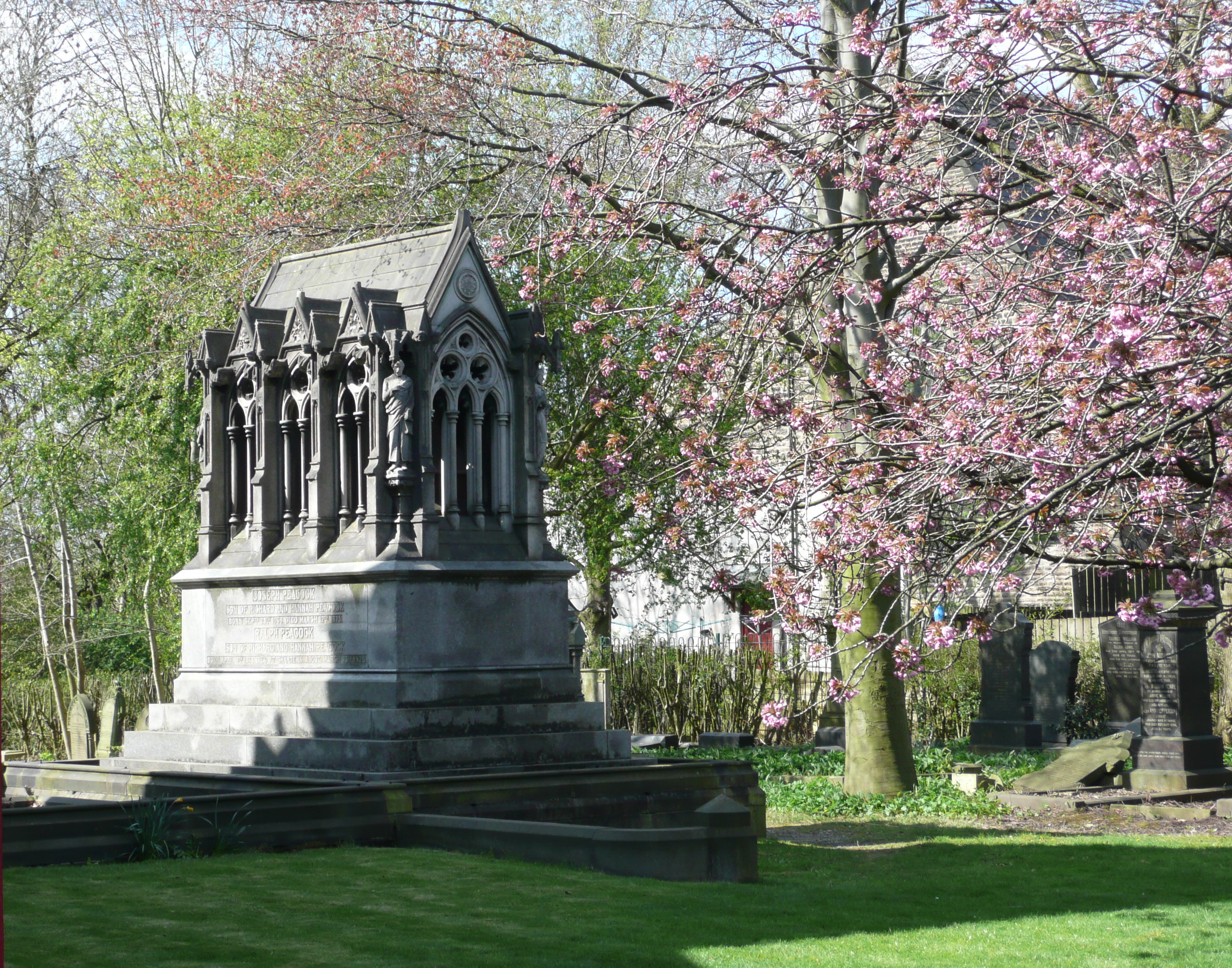
Peacock Mausoleum located at Brookfield Unitarian Church, Gorton

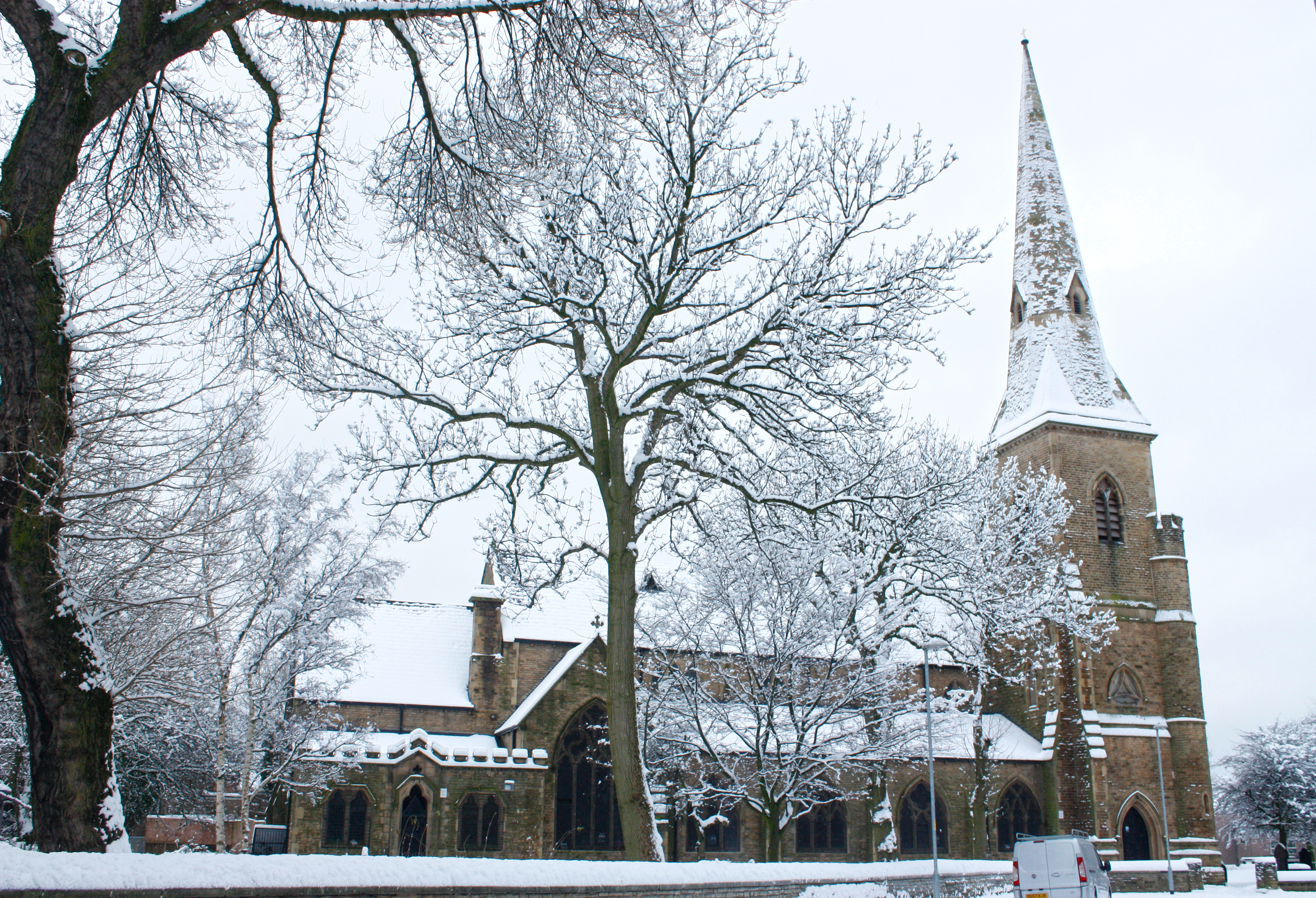
St James' Church, Gorton.

There are a number of grade-listed buildings in Gorton, most notably Gorton Monastery. Other listed buildings and monuments include:

- Anglican Church of Saint Benedict - this is the site of the Manchester Climbing Centre.
- St James' Church
- The Plough Inn
- Brookfield Unitarian Church & Brookfield Sunday School
- Peacock Mausoleum - this is situated on the grounds of Brookfield Church along with many other memorial stones including that of James Rider of the Gorton Philharmonic, The Grimshaws of Stansfield Lodge (including Joseph Stansfield Grimshaw Esq.), and various workers of Gorton Foundry
- Brookfield Lodge
- 46-50 Far Lane
- 56-60 Tan Yard Brow
- Springbank Farmhouse
- 60-66 High Bank Lane
- Gorton House - situated within Debdale Park
- Our Lady and St Thomas of Canterbury Church
- Beswick Co-operative Society Building

Gorton was home to the world-famous Belle Vue Zoological Gardens from 1836 until its closure in the 1980s. At its peak, Belle Vue attracted more than two million visitors a year.

== Transport ==
=== Railway ===
The area is served by several railway stations including Gorton, Ashburys, Belle Vue and Ryder Brow.

Trains on the Hope Valley Line and Glossop line stop at Gorton. Services are operated by Northern Trains, with services to Manchester Piccadilly, Glossop, Hadfield and Rose Hill Marple.

Until 1970, passenger services on the Great Central Railway passed through the station. Gorton station is mentioned in the 1964 song Slow Train by Flanders & Swann, where it was referred to as Openshaw.

==== History ====
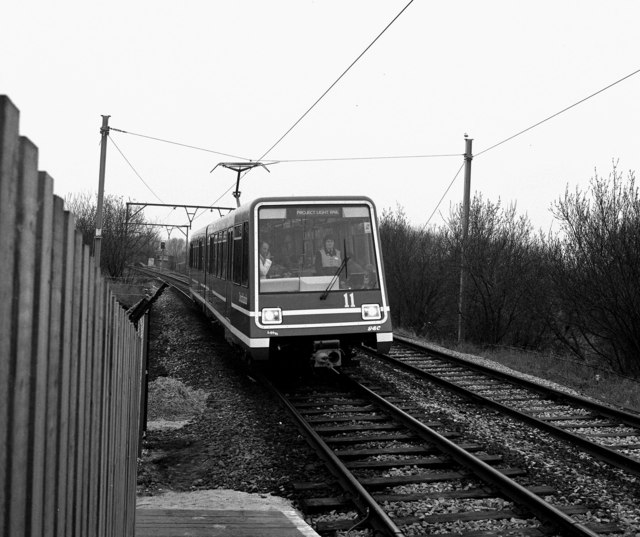
A DLR P86 stock demonstration at Debdale Park in 1987, in the lead-up to the construction of the Manchester Metrolink

Another railway station in the Gorton area, Hyde Road, was opened in 1882 on the Fallowfield Loop railway line until the route closed to passengers in 1958. The station had a brief revival in 1987, when it played a role in the early development of the Manchester Metrolink system. A temporary station called Debdale Park was constructed on the station site to host a public exhibition of Project Light Rail, in which a DLR P86 stock light rail vehicle on loan from the Docklands Light Railway in London was driven along a short stretch of track to demonstrate the light rail/tram configuration then being planned for Manchester. Soon after the demonstration, the Fallowfield line was dismantled; it has since been converted by Sustrans into a shared use path – the Fallowfield Loop – which runs from Fairfield to St Werburgh's Road tram stop in Chorlton-cum-Hardy.

==== Manufacturing ====
A company that became renowned for its locomotives, exported world-wide, was established at Gorton on the southern side of the railway line, (Note: 53°27′59″N 02°10′37″W) in 1854. The proprietors, Charles Beyer, Richard Peacock and Henry Robertson, incorporated in 1902 as Beyer, Peacock & Company.

Richard Peacock had previously been the chief engineer of the Manchester, Sheffield & Lincolnshire Railway's locomotive works nearby at Openshaw (north of the railway line), (Note: The name of the MS&L Railway's workshops, Gorton Locomotive Works, known locally as the Gorton Tank (location 53°28′15″N 02°10′37″W), is often confused with the Gorton Foundry works of Beyer, Peacock & Company.) and had seen an opportunity for locomotive manufacture by a private company. An early success was the world's first successful type of steam condensing locomotives for underground railways, of which 148 were built. In the 20th century, the company designed and manufactured more than 1,000 powerful articulated locomotives called Garratts. By the time the company wound up in 1966, it had built nearly 8,000 steam and diesel locomotives.

== Governance ==
The former municipal borough of Manchester was created in 1838 and elevated to a city in 1853. Part of Gorton township was included in the city in 1890. The remaining part of the township became an Urban District of the administrative county of Lancashire in 1894. A small part of the urban district was transferred to the city of Manchester in 1901 and the remaining area was fully incorporated into Manchester in 1909. Since boundary reviews in 2018, it is part of the Gorton and Abbey Hey ward, and local services and government are run by Manchester City Council.

Gorton formed part of the Manchester Gorton parliamentary constituency, comprising Gorton North, Gorton South, Fallowfield, Longsight, Levenshulme, Rusholme and Whalley Range wards. Father of the House and Britain's longest serving backbench MP, Gerald Kaufman, represented the Gorton area (Ardwick followed by Manchester Gorton) for 47 years until his death in February 2017. He was followed by Afzal Khan. Following Boundary changes that took effect following the July 4th 2024 General Election, the area is now covered under the Gorton and Denton constituency, held by the Green Party's Hannah Spencer.

== Performing arts ==
Gorton Philharmonic Orchestra was founded in 1854 and is an amateur orchestra. The folk comedy group Gorton Tank were based in Gorton and were popular in the Manchester area. The painter Michael Gutteridge was born in Gorton. The Gorton Morris Men were responsible for reviving the rushcart ceremony in Gorton.

== Sport ==
Manchester City F.C. were founded as St. Mark's (West Gorton) in 1880. Abbey Hey F.C. club is in Gorton.

The 2023 Britbowl champions are the Manchester Titans, based in Gorton.

"Bouncing Billy Barker" was a local man who specialised in jumping feats.

== Folklore traditions ==
John Higson (1825–1871), a Gorton antiquarian, wrote about mid-nineteenth-century supernatural beliefs in what was then still a rural community. He detailed a series of local boggarts including: Nell Parlour Boggart ('rough and hairy, with eyes as big as saucers'); Gorton Field Boggart; Green Stile Boggart; and Ho' Lane Boggart (which appeared in the form of 'a dog, hare, rabbit, or other small animal'). There was also a Boggart House (a haunted house). Fairy rings and fairy pipes (tiny early modern pipes) were frequently found, according to Higson, in the countryside round about. Nell Parlour, a local place associated with the supernatural, was a clough known for a 'village damsel' who had been seduced and 'became insane'. Higson also wrote a boggart poem in local dialect entitled 'Th' Boggart O' Gorton Chapelyord'.

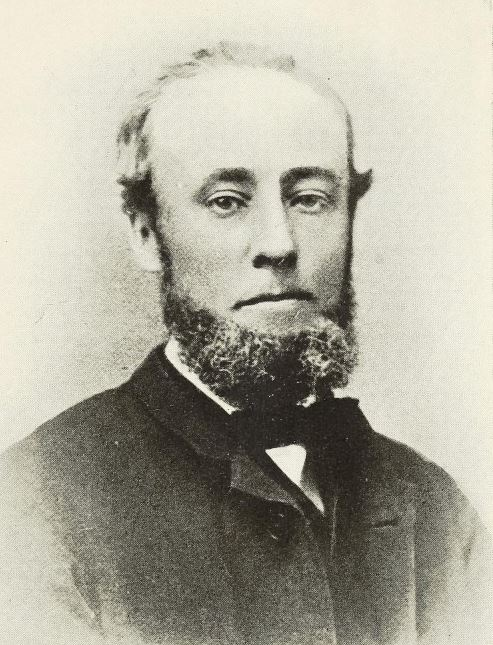
John Higson, Gorton antiquarian

== Notable residents ==
- Bob Berry, former England and Lancashire cricketer, was born in Gorton.
- Samuel Birch (British Army officer)
- Nicky Butt, former England and Manchester United footballer, was born in Gorton.
- Roger Byrne, Manchester United player who died in the Munich Air Disaster lived at Wistaria Road in the 1940/50s.
- Thomas Evenson, silver medalist in the 3000 meters steeplechase at the 1932 Los Angeles Olympics, was born in Gorton.
- Samuel Gorton, early settler of North America and fifth President of Rhode Island, was born and raised in Gorton in the 1590s.
- John Higson (1825–1871), the antiquarian was born in a poor farming family in Gorton.
- Tommy Johnson, a former footballer for Manchester City F.C, lived in Gorton.
- Meekz, rapper, born in Gorton
- Billy Meredith, former footballer lived on Clowes street and married at St Mark's Church.
- Nemzzz, rapper, raised in Gorton
- Brian Statham, former England and Lancashire cricketer, born in Gorton.
- John Thaw, actor best known for his role as Inspector Morse, was born in West Gorton.
- George Wilkinson, three-time Olympic water polo champion, born in Gorton.
- Jeff Williams, 1980 Olympic cyclist, was born in Gorton.

== See also ==
- Listed buildings in Manchester-M18
