= Hyde Road railway station =

Former railway station in east Manchester, England

Hyde Road
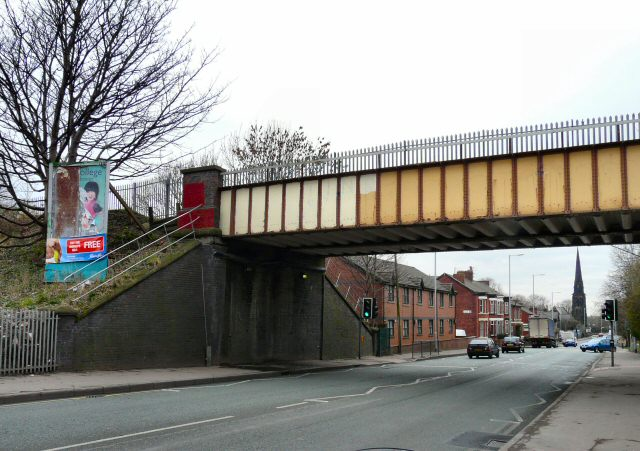
- The railway bridge next to the site of the former Hyde Road station

General information
- Location: Gorton, Manchester; England
- Coordinates: 53.45944°N 2.16417°W
- Grid reference: SJ892959
- Platforms: 4

Other information
- Status: Disused

History
- Original company: Manchester, Sheffield and Lincolnshire Railway
- Pre-grouping: Great Central Railway
- Post-grouping: London and North Eastern Railway

Key dates
- 2 May 1892: Station opened
- 7 July 1958: Station closed
Location

Hyde Road was a railway station in Gorton, Manchester, England, on the Fallowfield Loop Line. It opened in 1892 and closed in 1958, when local passenger services on the line were withdrawn. The station was sometimes advertised as Hyde Road for Belle Vue, given its close proximity to Belle Vue Zoo which was about one mile away. The line was closed completely in 1988 and the track was taken up. The station has long since been demolished and the site was partly redeveloped. The former trackbed is now a popular shared use path called the Fallowfield Loop.

The station was named after Hyde Road, which begins at the east end of Ardwick Green South in Ardwick and runs east towards Hyde. At the boundary between Gorton and Denton, it continues as Manchester Road.

== History ==
The initial section of the Fallowfield Loop line was opened by the Manchester, Sheffield and Lincolnshire Railway (Cheshire Lines Committee) between Chorlton-cum-Hardy and Fallowfield on 1 October 1891. The following year, the remaining section between Fallowfield and Fairfield, including Hyde Road station, opened on 2 May 1892. The line provided a new route for the MS&LR to run trains from Sheffield into Manchester; local stopping services ran from Fairfield and Gorton to Manchester Central via Hyde Road, Fallowfield and Chorlton-cum-Hardy before joining a section of line from Old Trafford to Manchester Central.

Hyde Road station comprised a set of brick buildings on an embankment on the north side of Hyde Road. The northbound platforms were mostly wooden structures. The Great Central Railway built two bay platforms at Hyde Road to accommodate excursion trains to Belle Vue Zoo, which were in use until at least 1914 but were eventually taken out of use. The station had a large goods yard on its east side, consisting of four sidings and a five-ton crane, controlled by a signalbox on the northbound platform, and a second box controlling the north junction to Gorton. These were later replaced by a single new box on the west side of the line.

In 1897, the MSLR became the Great Central Railway and, in 1923, the line was absorbed into the LNER. Over this period, the Fallowfield Loop line suffered from competition from faster rail services into Manchester provided by the LNER, from Belle Vue or Gorton and Openshaw, and later further competition arrived in the form of the Manchester Corporation Tramways. By the 1930s, the LNER had greatly reduced the stopping services and mostly used the line for express trains.

After 1948, the line was under the ownership of the nationalised British Railways. Briefly, consideration was given to electrification of the line; however, the local stopping services were withdrawn instead and Hyde Road station closed to passenger services on 7 July 1958. Hyde Road goods yard remained in active use as a depot for local coal merchants. Express passenger services out of Manchester Central continued to use the line, until that terminus was closed in 1969 during the implementation of the Beeching cuts. For another two decades, the line was used by freight trains until the line closed completely in 1988.

=== Project Light Rail ===
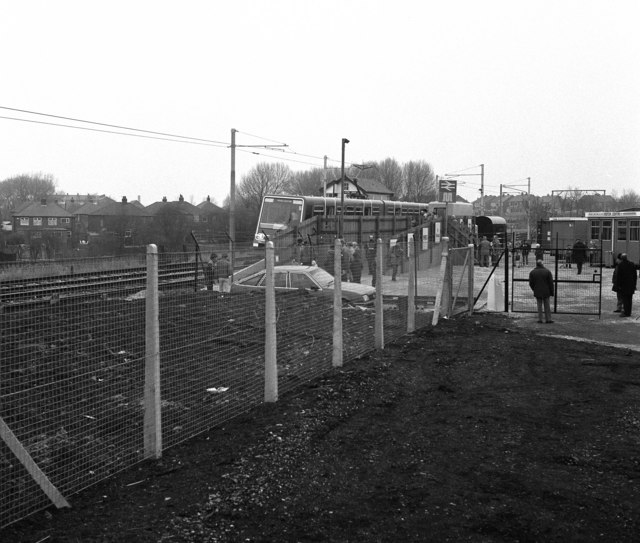
The temporary Debdale Park station, used for Project Light Rail in 1987

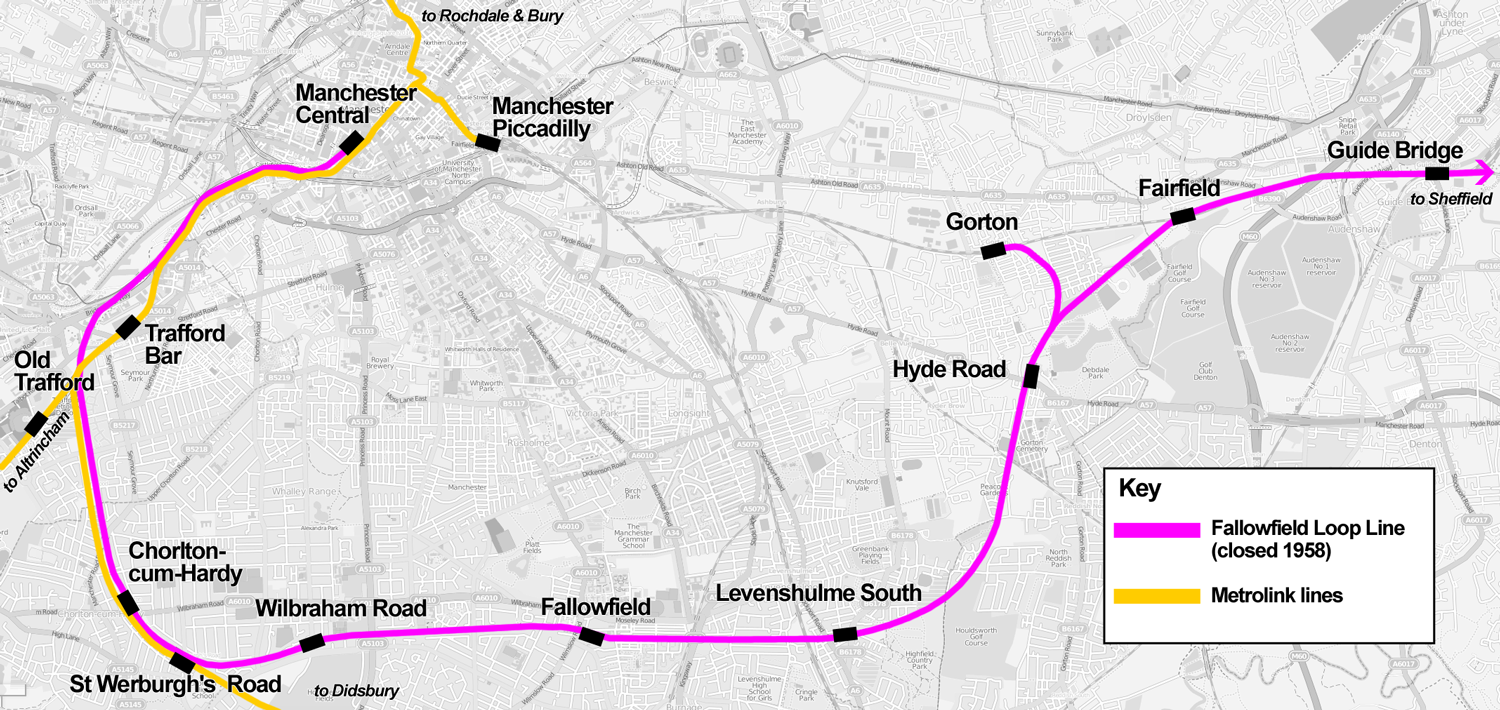
Fallowfield Loop line map

Shortly before its demise, in 1987, the Fallowfield Loop line played an important role in the early development of the Manchester Metrolink system, when the stretch of track at Debdale Park on the site of the former Hyde Road railway station was used for a public demonstration of Project Light Rail. This was the working title for the development of a new light rail tram network in Manchester. The event made use of a Docklands Light Railway train, DLR P86 no. 11, on loan from GEC Transportation Projects, prior to its introduction onto the fledgling Docklands system in London; it was the first ever light rail vehicle seen in operation in Manchester. The event was staged jointly by the Greater Manchester Passenger Transport Executive, British Rail, British Rail Engineering Limited, GEC, Balfour Beatty and Fairclough Civil Engineering; it was opened formally by David Mitchell MP, Minister of State for Transport, on 10 March 1987.

Demonstrations were held on 14, 15, 20, 21 and 22 March 1987 at a specially-constructed railway station at Debdale Park. Ticket holders were treated to a short ride on the DLR vehicle along a 1-mile (1.6 km) stretch of track, from just north of the Hyde Road junction to just south of the closed Reddish Electric Depot. The DLR train was specially fitted with a pantograph and powered by overhead line; it was driven manually rather than in automatic mode, which was to be normal practice when in operation on the Docklands system. The test track was closed to normal heavy rail traffic on demonstration days and, at night, the DLR train was stationed in a siding and the line was re-opened to freight trains. An exhibition also exhibited examples of street track, overhead line and platform facilities.

After the public event, Debdale Park station was dismantled and the timber platform was used to build the new Hag Fold railway station near Wigan; the electric overhead line equipment was taken down and re-used at the Heaton Park Tramway on the lakeside extension. The demonstration train DLR no. 11 was transported to London, where it was put into operation on the Docklands Light Railway. It served as the Royal Train, transporting the Queen and Prince Philip on the formal opening of the DLR. In 1991, DLR no. 11 was the first of the P86 fleet to be sold to the City of Essen, Germany, where it is in service today on the EVAG Stadtbahn.

== Fallowfield Loop path ==
Following closure in 1988, the Fallowfield Loop railway line tracks were lifted; the route became derelict and overgrown for several years. Around 2001, a new use was found for the line and the old trackbed was converted into a public shared use path. Today, the Fallowfield Loop path is operated by Sustrans; it runs from Fairfield to Chorlton and forms part of Routes 6 and 60 of the National Cycle Network.

Preceding station	Disused railways	Following station
Levenshulme South; Line and station closed	LNER; Manchester, Sheffield and Lincolnshire Railway; Fallowfield Loop	Gorton; Line closed, station open
Levenshulme South; Line and station closed	LNER; Manchester, Sheffield and Lincolnshire Railway; Fallowfield Loop	Fairfield; Line closed, station open
