= Wilbraham Road railway station =

Former railway station in south Manchester, England

Wilbraham Road
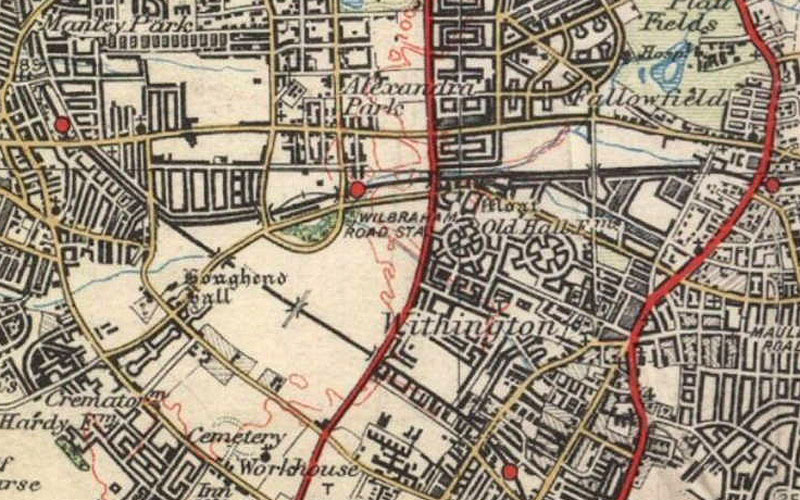
- 1937 OS map showing the location of Wilbraham Road railway station

General information
- Location: Whalley Range, Manchester, Manchester; England
- Coordinates: 53.4401°N 2.2515°W
- Grid reference: SJ834937
- Platforms: 2

Other information
- Status: Disused

History
- Original company: Manchester, Sheffield and Lincolnshire Railway
- Pre-grouping: Great Central Railway
- Post-grouping: London and North Eastern Railway

Key dates
- 2 May 1892: Station opens as Alexandra Park
- 1 July 1923: Station renamed Wilbraham Road
- 7 July 1958: Station closes
Location

Wilbraham Road railway station was in Whalley Range, Manchester, England, on the Fallowfield Loop line between Manchester Central and Fairfield, via Chorlton. Opened as Alexandra Park in 1892 by the Manchester, Sheffield and Lincolnshire Railway, it was near the junction of Alexandra Road South and Mauldeth Road West, close to Alexandra Park, and served the expanding residential suburb of Whalley Range. The railway line has since been converted into a shared use path.

== History ==
Alexandra Park station opened on 2 May 1892. From 1 August 1897 to 1 January 1923 the station was owned by the Great Central Railway (GCR). The GCR was absorbed by the London and North Eastern Railway (LNER) during the Grouping of 1923. The station was renamed Wilbraham Road on 1 July 1923 to avoid possible confusion with the north London suburb of Alexandra Park on the same network. The naming was an unusual choice, since the station was about a 1/4 mile (400 m) from the A6010 Wilbraham Road, and was not visible from there.

During 1918–19 the station goods yard was used to receive aircraft fuselages, wings and other major components from Avro at Newton Heath and the National Aircraft Factory No. 2 at Heaton Chapel for assembly at the nearby Alexandra Park Aerodrome, which lay 300 yards (270 m) to the south.

Passenger services on the Fallowfield Loop line were infrequent; the line suffered from competition from alternative rail services into Manchester provided by the LNER from Levenshulme and later from the electric trams. By the 1930s the LNER had greatly reduced the stopping services and mostly used the line for express trains. After 1948, the line was under the ownership of the nationalised British Railways.

The electrification of the line was briefly considered but, instead, the local stopping services were withdrawn and Wilbraham Road station was closed to passenger services by British Railways on 7 July 1958. However, SELNEC PTE continued to run a scheduled motor-bus service from the station, timed according to the now-defunct passenger timetable. Express services out of Manchester Central continued to use the line until that terminus was closed in 1969 following the Beeching cuts. For another two decades the line was used by freight trains until the line closed completely in 1988. Eventually the station buildings were demolished and today only some residual brickwork of the platform edges survives. The sidings at the other side of Alexandra Road South, however, remained in use by SPD Distribution until the line closed. The track bed of the line crosses a road on the former site, and the Station Master's house is still in use as a private residence.

== Fallowfield Loop path ==
Following closure in 1988, the Fallowfield Loop railway line tracks were lifted; the route became derelict and overgrown for several years. Around 2001, a new use was found for the line and the old trackbed was converted into a public shared use path. Today, the Fallowfield Loop path is operated by Sustrans; it runs from Fairfield to Chorlton and forms part of Routes 6 and 60 of the National Cycle Network.

== Blues and Gospel Train ==
On 7 May 1964, Granada Television transformed the disused buildings into Chorltonville, a southern U.S.-style station, for a programme called Blues and Gospel Train with Muddy Waters, Otis Spann, Sonny Terry and Brownie McGhee, Sister Rosetta Tharpe, Rev. Gary Davis and Cousin Joe Pleasant.

== Railways in the area of Chorlton and Withington ==
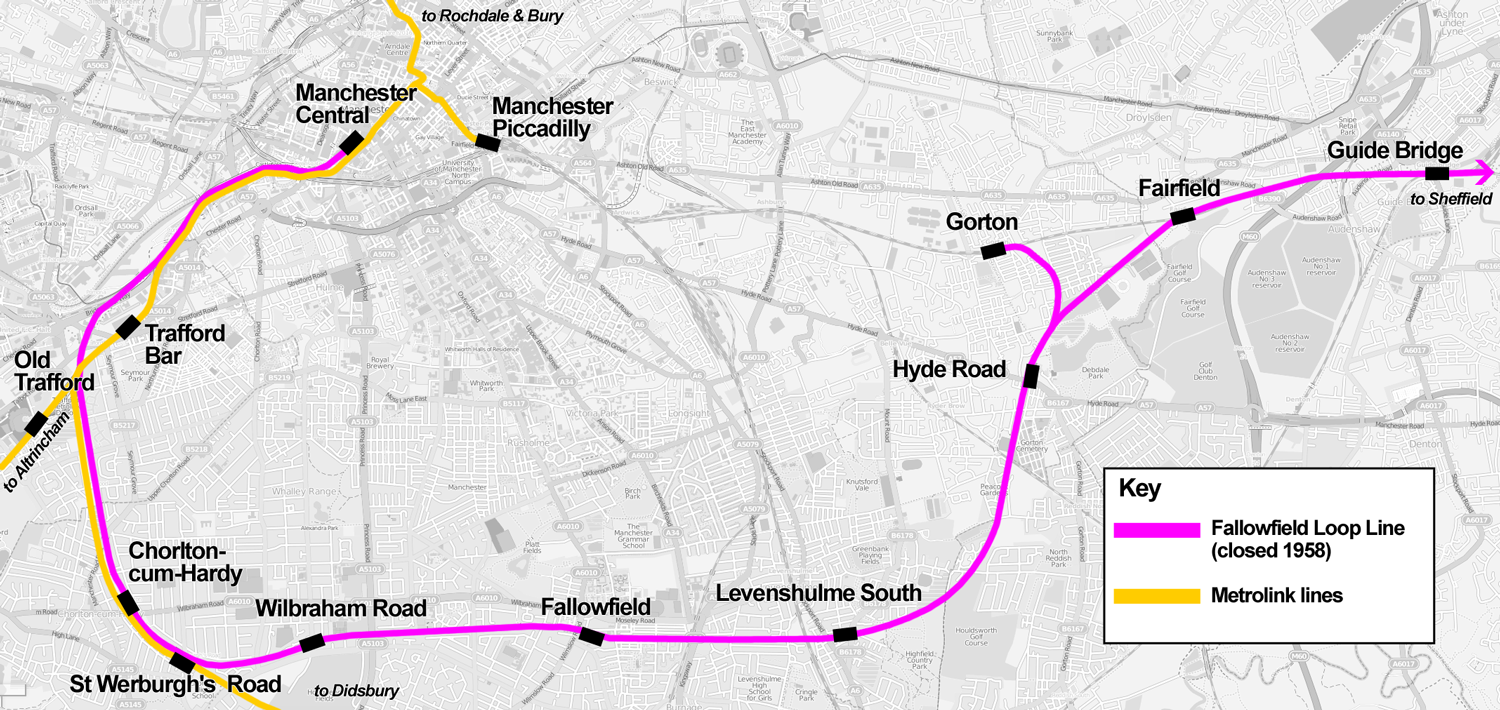
Fallowfield loop line map

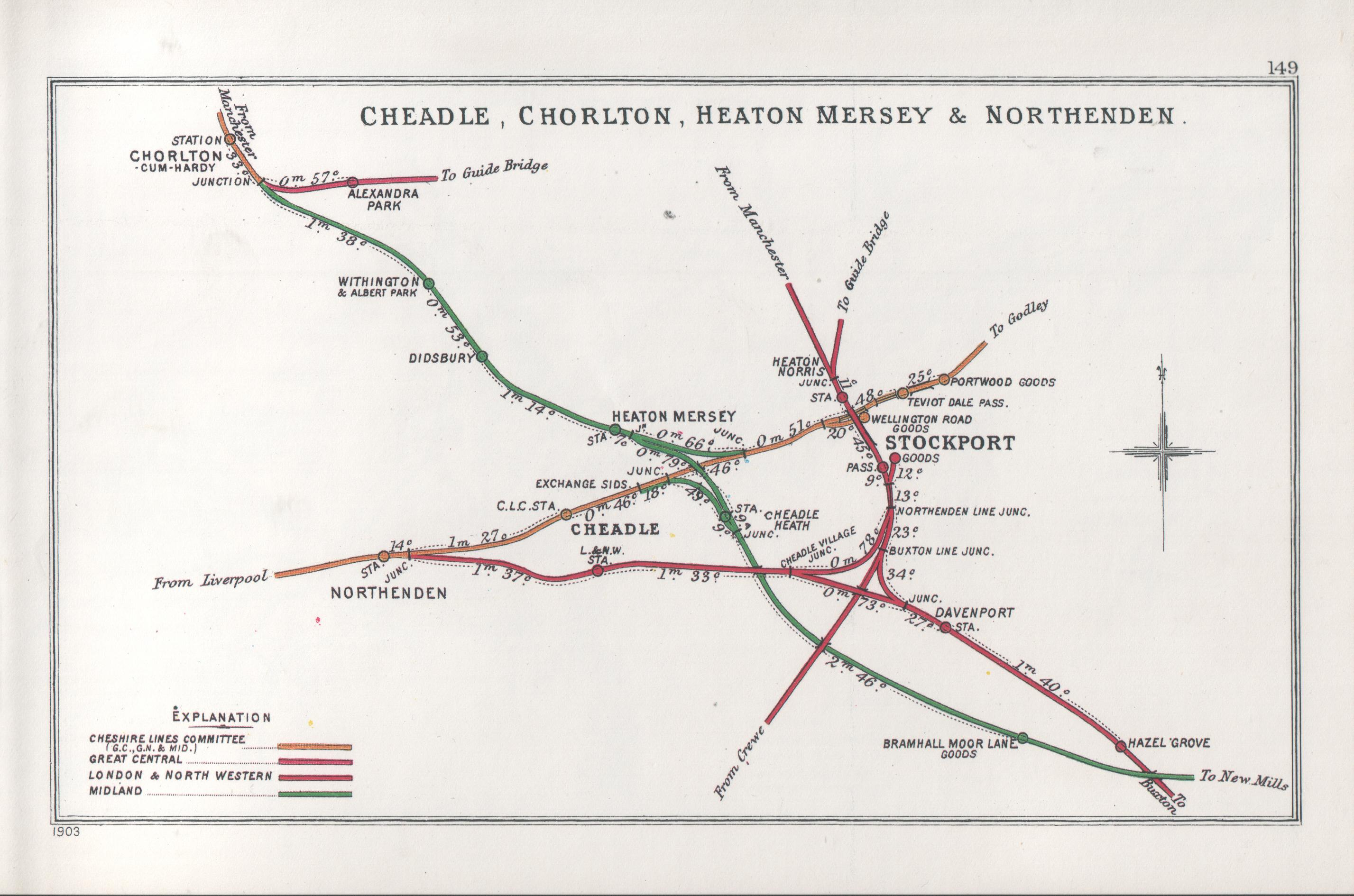
1903 Railway Clearing House diagram of South Manchester railways showing (top) Alexandra Park station on the Great Central line to Guide Bridge, just east of Chorlton Junction

Preceding station	Disused railways	Following station
Chorlton-cum-Hardy	LNER; Manchester, Sheffield and Lincolnshire Railway; Fallowfield Loop	Fallowfield
