= Fallowfield railway station =

Disused railway station in Manchester, England

Fallowfield
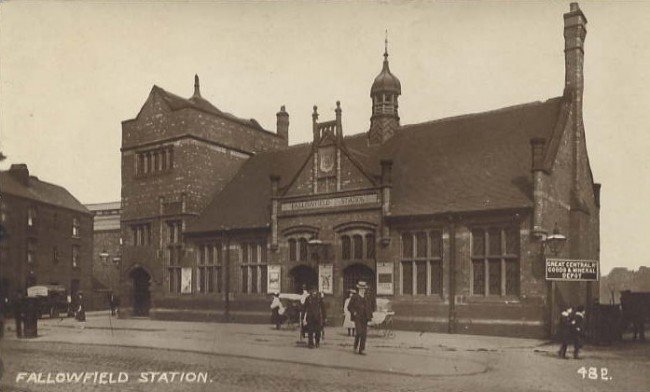
- Fallowfield station, as seen in 1910

General information
- Location: Fallowfield, Manchester; England
- Coordinates: 53.44111°N 2.21861°W
- Grid reference: SJ856938
- Platforms: 2

Other information
- Status: Disused

History
- Original company: Manchester, Sheffield and Lincolnshire Railway
- Pre-grouping: Great Central Railway
- Post-grouping: London and North Eastern Railway

Key dates
- 1 October 1891: Station opened
- 7 July 1958: Station closed
Location

Fallowfield railway station is a disused station that is located on Wilmslow Road in Fallowfield, a southern suburb of Manchester, England. It was on the Fallowfield Loop railway line, a suburban railway which looped around the south of the city and terminated at the former Manchester Central railway station. The station closed to passengers in 1958, but its building still stands on the corner of Wilmslow Road and Ladybarn Road.

== History ==
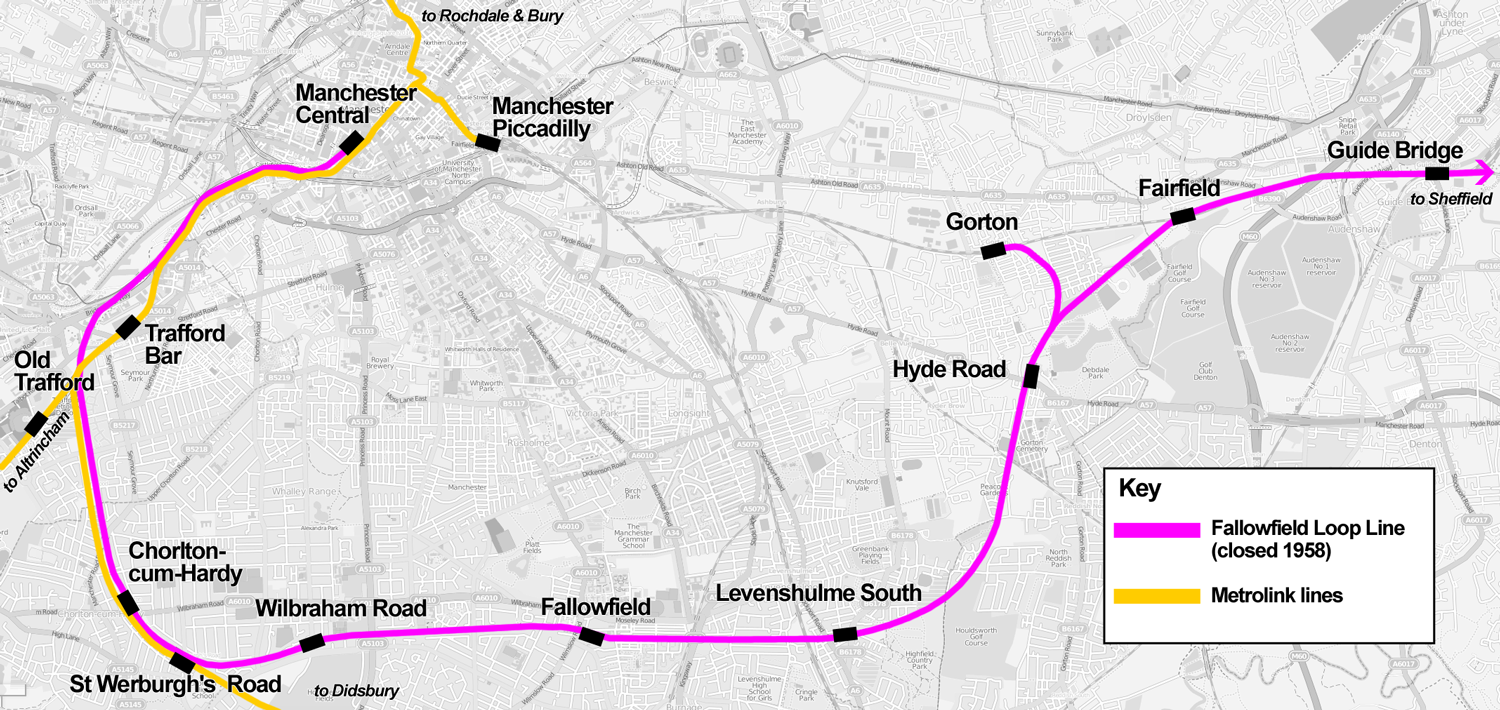
Map of the Fallowfield Loop Line

The initial section of the Fallowfield Loop line was opened by the Manchester, Sheffield and Lincolnshire Railway (Cheshire Lines Committee) between Chorlton-cum-Hardy and Fallowfield on 1 October 1891. The following year, the remaining section between Fallowfield and Fairfield opened on 2 May 1892. The line provided a new route for the MS&LR to run trains from Sheffield into Manchester, and local stopping services ran between Manchester Central and Guide Bridge through Fallowfield. The line stretched from the Hope Valley Line at Fairfield and Gorton railway stations through Levenshulme South and Fallowfield onto Wilbraham Road and Chorlton-cum-Hardy before joining a section of line from Old Trafford to Manchester Central.

The Fallowfield station building was constructed in a red brick mock Tudor style on a road overbridge straddling the loop line. There were two platforms which were accessed from the street-level booking office by canopied walkways down to track level, a signalbox in the middle of the westbound platform and a nearby goods yard equipped with a 5-ton crane to the south.

In 1897 the MSLR became the Great Central Railway, then in 1923 the line was absorbed into the LNER. Over this period the Fallowfield Loop line suffered from competition from alternative rail services into Manchester provided by the LNER from Levenshulme and later from the electric trams. By the 1930s the LNER had greatly reduced the stopping services and mostly used the line for express trains. After 1948, the line was under the ownership of the nationalised British Railways. Briefly, consideration was given to electrification of the line, but instead the local stopping services were withdrawn and Fallowfield station closed to passenger services on 7 July 1958. Express services out of Manchester Central continued to use the line until that terminus was closed in 1969 following the Beeching cuts. For another two decades the line was used by freight trains until the line closed completely in 1988, with the station's sidings being used by the London Brick Company.

== The station today ==
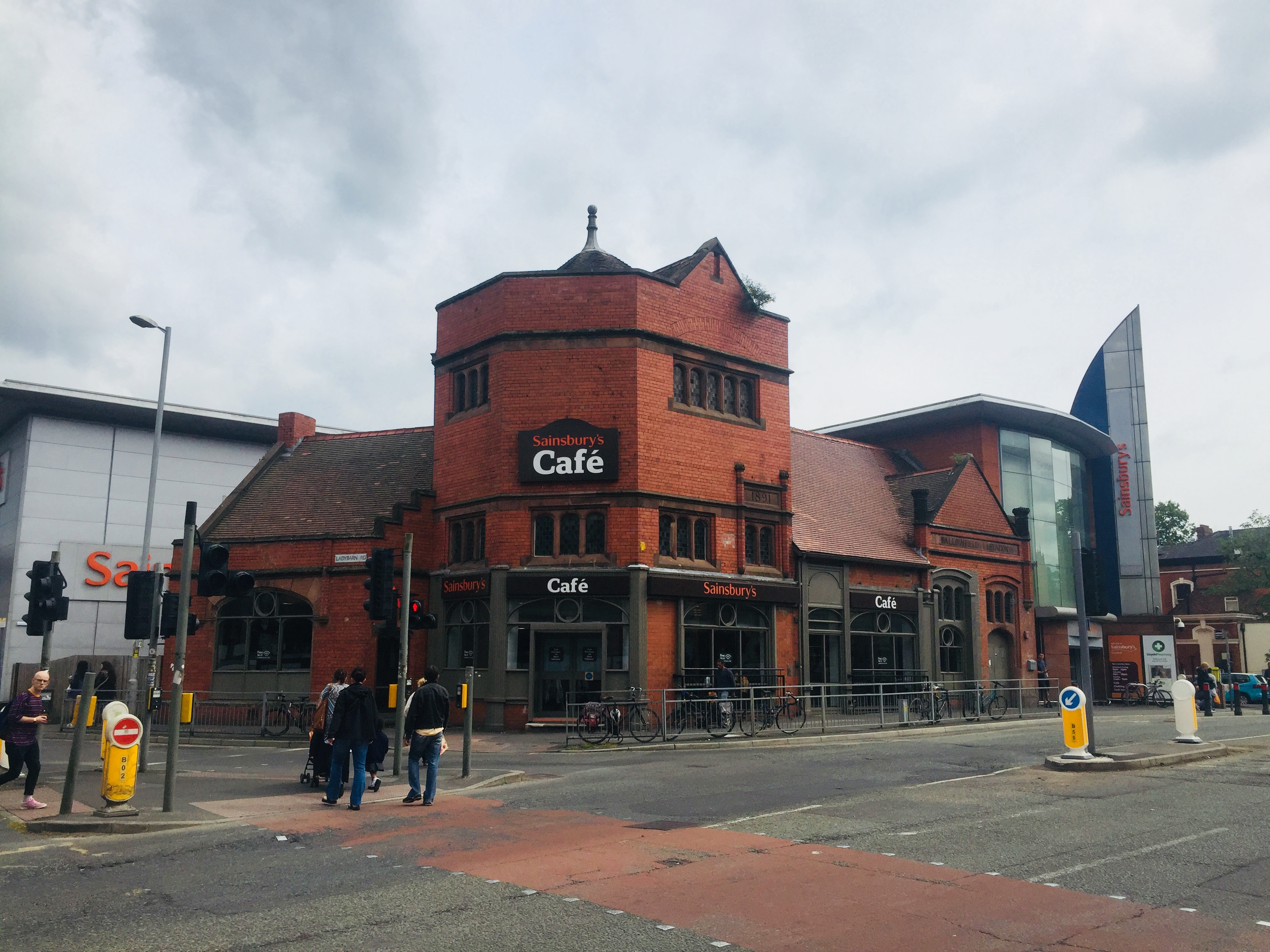
The station building, as it is today

After its closure, the station building saw a number of years as a bar. The site, including the former goods yard, has since been redeveloped; it is now occupied by an apartment block and a Sainsbury's supermarket. The former station building still stands and is occupied by a Starbucks.

The route of the Fallowfield Loop railway trackbed has been repurposed as a shared use path between Fairfield and Chorlton called the Fallowfield Loop; however, a short diversionary path had to be created around the Fallowfield station site where the former railway's route was blocked by the redevelopment.

A section of line from Manchester Central to St. Werburgh's Road in Chorlton has been reopened as part of the Manchester Metrolink tram system.

Preceding station	Disused railways	Following station
Wilbraham Road	LNER; Manchester, Sheffield and Lincolnshire Railway; Fallowfield Loop	Levenshulme South
