= Reddish Electric Depot =

Former railway depot in Greater Manchester, England

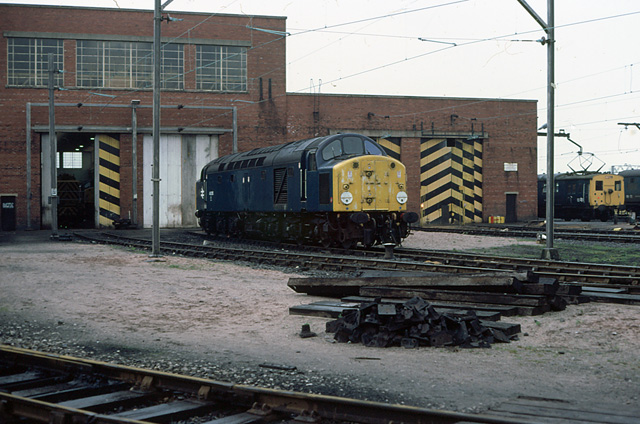
- A Class 40 diesel locomotive and Class 506 EMU outside Reddish depot in May 1981
- Interactive map of Reddish Electric Depot

Location
- Location: Reddish, Greater Manchester
- Coordinates: 53.4511°N 2.1678°W
- OS grid: SJ888949

Characteristics
- Owner: British Rail
- Depot code: RS (1973 - 1983)
- Type: Electric: 1,500V overhead DC power

History
- Opened: 1954
- Closed: 1983
- Former depot code: 39A (1 June 1954 - 31 January 1958); 9H (1 February 1958 - 19 April 1954); 9G (20 April 1958 - 8 September 1963); 9C (9 September 1963 - 5 May 1973)

Reddish Electric Depot was an electric traction depot located in Reddish, Stockport, England. It was situated on the west side of the Fallowfield Loop line between Hyde Road and Levenshulme South stations; however, neither of the Reddish stations (North and South) were sited on this line. It was built to service the electric locomotives and local electric multiple units (EMUs) that were employed on the Woodhead Line between Manchester Piccadilly, Hadfield, Sheffield and Wath.

== Access to the depot ==
The Fallowfield Loop line, which the depot was sited on, was not electrified; so, to enable electric locomotive and EMU access to the depot from the Woodhead line, part of the line from Fairfield Junction as far as the depot was electrified overhead to 1,500V DC.

== Depot allocation ==
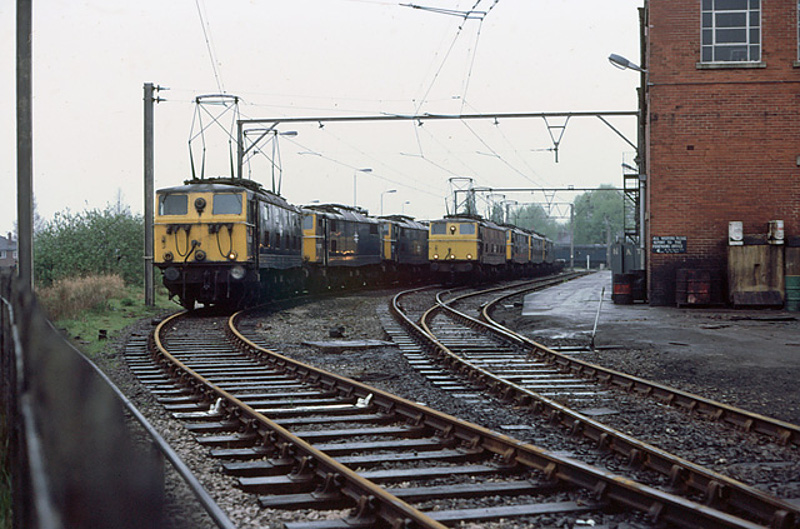
Class 76s at the depot in 1981, shortly before their withdrawal

The depot had an allocation of EM1 and EM2 electric locomotives and Class 506 EMUs.

The EM2 locomotives were deemed surplus to requirements when the Woodhead line's inter-city passenger services were withdrawn in January 1970; they were sold subsequently to the Dutch national railway operator Nederlandse Spoorwegen, where they became the NS 1500 Class. When the Woodhead line was closed to goods services in July 1981, almost all EM1 locomotives were sold for scrap. The Class 506 EMUs remained at Reddish until the depot's closure, as the Glossop line was retained for local services between Manchester, Glossop and Hadfield.

In addition, some other traction visited the depot for maintenance, although they were not allocated here; for example, Class 40 diesel locomotives.

== Closure ==
The Woodhead line was closed beyond Hadfield in July 1981, when the EM1 locomotives were withdrawn. The depot continued to host the Class 506 units and service visiting traction, but its workload had reduced significantly. Reddish depot closed in April 1983.

The Class 506 units then had to be diesel-hauled to Longsight Electric TMD for servicing, due to their incompatibility with the available 25kV power supply.

In December 1984, the Glossop line was converted to the standard 25 kV AC overhead system and the Class 506 EMUs were withdrawn, following the last run on 7 December.

The depot lay derelict for several years before demolition; in the late 2000s, the site was redeveloped for housing.
