= Fallowfield Loop railway line =

Disused railway line in south Manchester, England

Fallowfield Loop Line
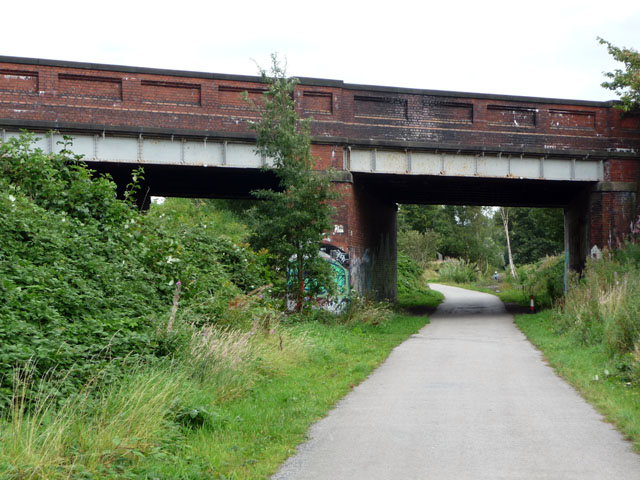
- St Werburgh's Road bridge over the Fallowfield Loop shared-use path in 2009, before the construction of the Metrolink line

Overview
- Status: Disused, re-purposed as a shared-use path
- Owner: Manchester, Sheffield and Lincolnshire Railway; British Rail
- Locale: Manchester, England
- Termini: Manchester Central; Guide Bridge/Gorton
- Stations: 4

Service
- Type: Local rail
- System: National Rail

History
- Opened: 1892
- Closed: Closed to passengers 1958; fully closed 1988

Technical
- Track gauge: 4 ft 8 1/2 in (1,435 mm)
Route map
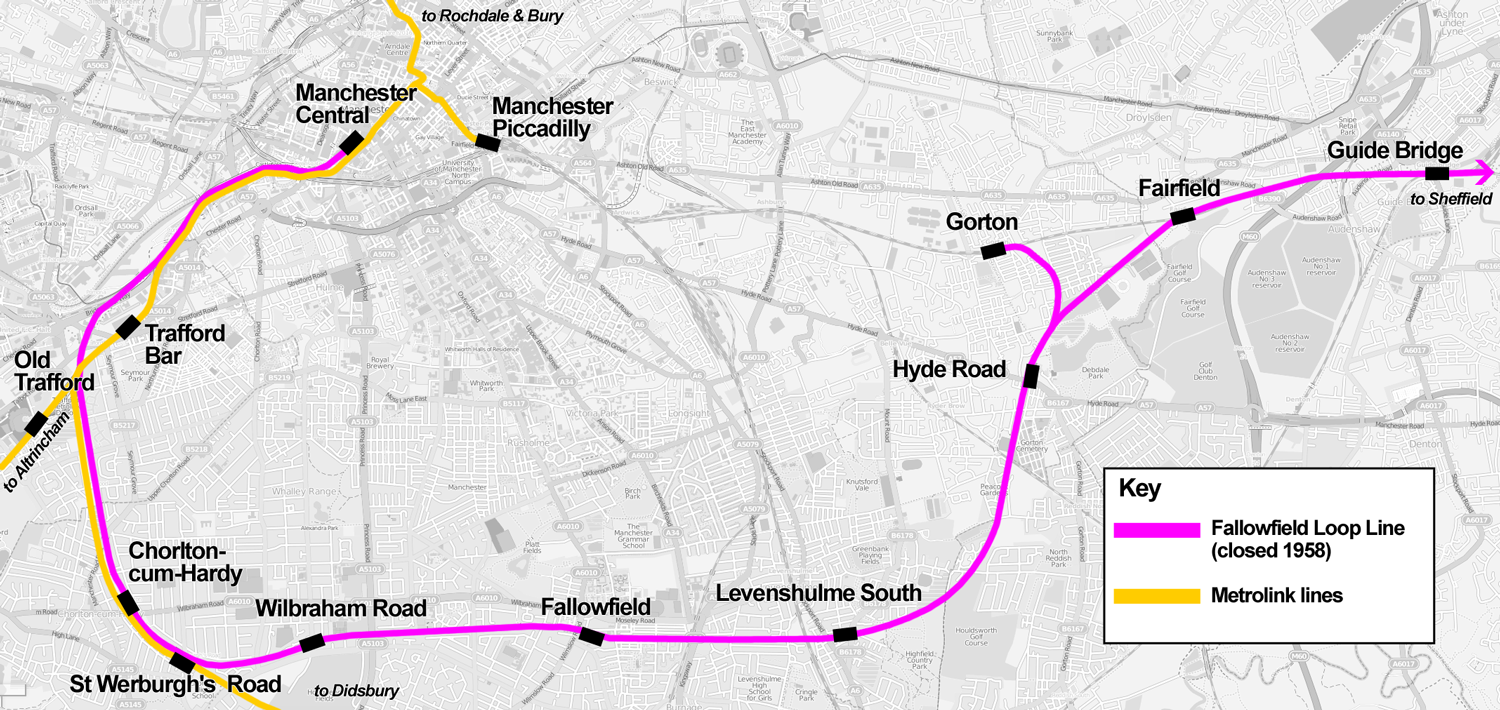

The Fallowfield Loop railway line was a local railway route in south Manchester, England. Trains on the Manchester, Sheffield and Lincolnshire Railway (MS&LR) line (later, the Great Central Railway line) from Sheffield Victoria and Guide Bridge used the Loop to access Manchester Central. Some express trains, including the Harwich-Liverpool boat train, used the line.

The line was fully opened in 1892 and remained in use until 1988; the stations at Hyde Road, Levenshulme South, Fallowfield and Wilbraham Road closed in 1958, following the withdrawal of passenger services.

Reddish Traction Depot was built adjacent to the line in 1954, to maintain the new fleet of electric trains for the Woodhead Line. It remained open until 1983; it has since been demolished and a housing estate was built on the site.

== History ==
The initial section of the Fallowfield Loop line was opened by the MS&LR (Cheshire Lines Committee) between Chorlton-cum-Hardy and Fallowfield on 1 October 1891. The following year, the remaining section between Fallowfield and Fairfield opened on 2 May 1892. The line provided a new route for the MS&LR to run trains from Sheffield into Manchester; local stopping services ran from Fairfield and Gorton to Manchester Central, via Hyde Road, Fallowfield and Chorlton-cum-Hardy, before joining a section of line from Old Trafford into Manchester Central.

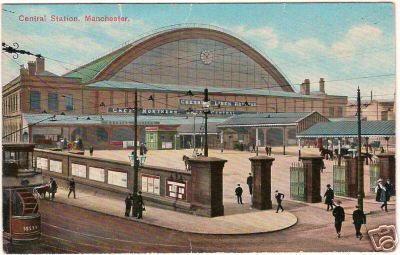
Manchester Central Station, terminus of the Fallowfield line

In 1897, the MS&LR became the Great Central Railway; in 1923, the line was absorbed into the London and North Eastern Railway (LNER). Over this period, the Fallowfield Loop line suffered from competition from alternative rail services into Manchester, provided by the LNER from Levenshulme and later from the electric trams. By the 1930s, the LNER had greatly reduced the stopping services and used the line mostly for express trains. After 1948, the line moved under the ownership of the nationalised British Railways. Briefly, consideration was given to electrification of the line, but instead the local stopping services were withdrawn and Fallowfield station was closed to passenger services on 7 July 1958. Express services out of Manchester Central continued to use the line, until that terminus was closed in 1969 during implementation of the Beeching cuts. For another two decades, the line was used by freight trains, until the line closed completely in 1988.

=== Reddish traction depot ===
In 1954, Reddish traction maintenance depot was built alongside the Fallowfield line, between Hyde Road and Levenshulme South stations. Its purpose was to service the new Class EM1 and EM2 electric locomotives and the Class 506 EMUs on the now-electrified Woodhead Line. After the Woodhead line closed beyond Hadfield in 1981, the depot's activity was reduced to servicing the EMUs on the Glossop Line until it was closed in April 1983. Servicing of the Class 506 EMUs was then transferred to Longsight depot, until the Glossop line was converted to 25 kV AC in December 1984. Several years after its closure, Reddish depot was demolished; the site remained derelict until the late 2000s, when the site was redeveloped for housing.

=== "Chorltonville" ===
On 7 May 1964, six years after passenger services had been withdrawn from the line, Wilbraham Road railway station featured in a Granada Television music programme, Blues and Gospel Train. Granada transformed the disused buildings into "Chorltonville", a fictional Southern U.S.-style station which was the setting for a televised performance by prominent Blues artists of the day, including Muddy Waters, Sonny Terry and Brownie McGhee, Sister Rosetta Tharpe, Rev. Gary Davis and others. The performers and artists are shown being taken by steam train from Manchester Central to Wilbraham Road and performances take place on the station platforms.

In 2026 a blue plaque honoring Rosetta Tharpe was installed at Manchester Central Convention Complex, - where the performers boarded the train.

=== Project Light Rail ===
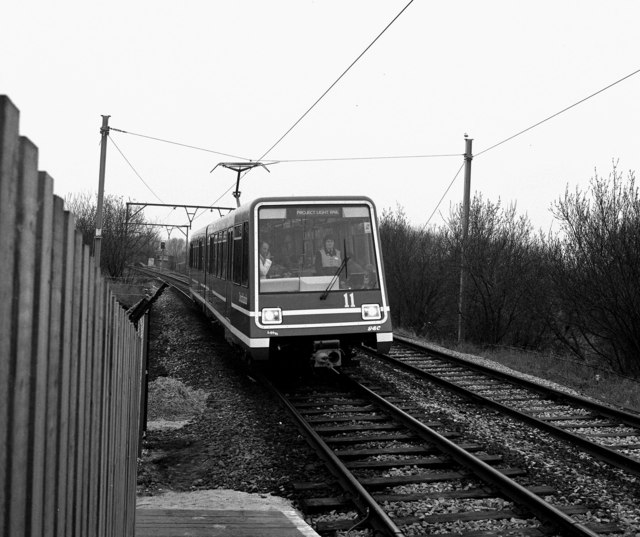
The light rail demonstration at Debdale Park in March 1987

Shortly before its demise, the Fallowfield Loop line played an important role in the early development of the Manchester Metrolink tram network; in 1987, the stretch of track at Debdale Park, on the site of the former Hyde Road railway station, was used for a public demonstration of Project Light Rail, the working title for the development of a new light rail/tram network in Manchester. The event made use of a Docklands Light Railway train, DLR P86 number 11 which was on loan from GEC Transportation Projects Ltd, prior to its introduction onto the fledgling Docklands system in London; it was the first ever light rail vehicle seen in operation in Manchester. The event was staged jointly by GMPTE, British Rail, British Rail Engineering Limited, GEC, Balfour Beatty and Fairclough Civil Engineering Ltd; it was formally opened by David Mitchell MP, Minister of State for Transport, on 10 March 1987.

Demonstrations were held on 14, 15, 20, 21 and 22 March 1987 at a specially-constructed railway station at Debdale Park. Ticket holders were treated to a short ride on the DLR vehicle along a 1-mile (1.6 km) stretch of track, from just north of the Hyde Road junction to just south of the closed Reddish depot. The DLR train was specially fitted with a pantograph and powered by overhead line; it was driven manually rather than in automatic mode, which was to be normal practice when in operation on the Docklands system. The test track was closed to normal heavy rail traffic on demonstration days and, at night, the DLR train was stationed in a siding and the line was re-opened to freight trains. An exhibition also exhibited examples of street track, overhead line and platform facilities.

After the public event, Debdale Park station was dismantled and the timber platform was used to build the new Hag Fold railway station near Wigan; the electric overhead line equipment was taken down and re-used at the Heaton Park Tramway on the lakeside extension. The demonstration train DLR Number 11 was transported to London, where it was put into operation on the Docklands Light Railway. It served as the Royal train, transporting the Queen and Prince Philip on the formal opening of the DLR. In 1991, DLR Number 11 was the first of the P86 fleet to be sold to the City of Essen, Germany, where it is in service today on the Essen Stadtbahn.

=== Conversion to a shared-use path ===
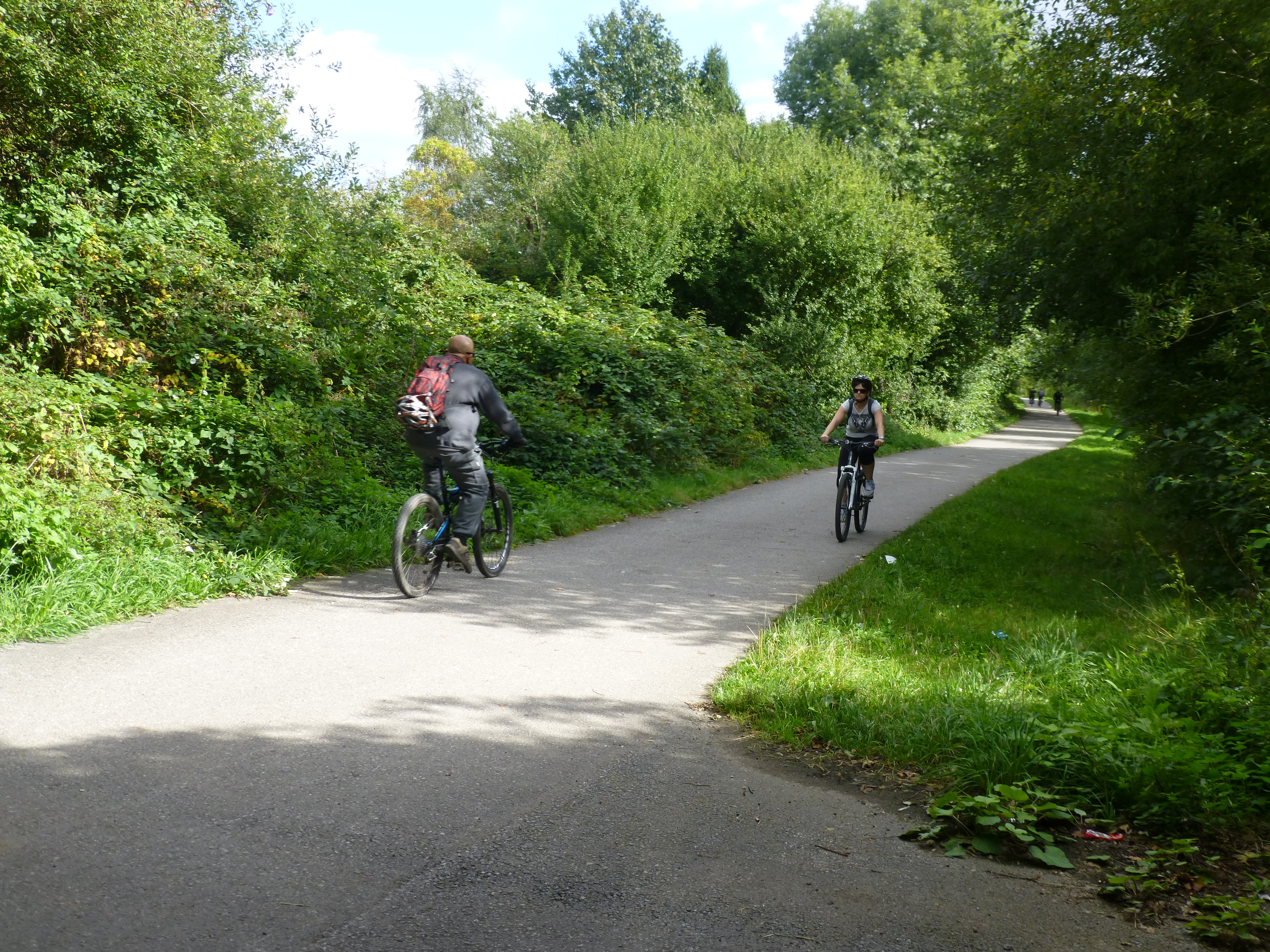
Cyclists on the Fallowfield Loop in September 2013

Following its closure in 1988, the Fallowfield Loop line's tracks were lifted and the route became derelict and overgrown for several years. Around 2001, a new use was found for the line and the old trackbed was converted into a public rail trail path. Today, the Fallowfield Loop path, operated by Sustrans, runs from just south of Fairfield station to St Werburgh's Road Metrolink station; it forms part of Routes 6 and 60 of the National Cycle Network.

=== Metrolink ===
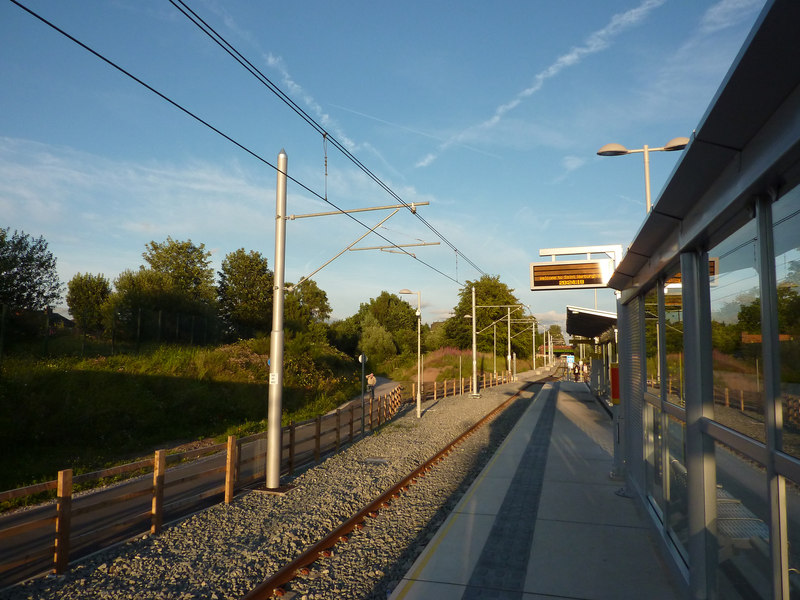
The junction with the former Midland Railway at St Werburgh's Rd tram stop; the shared-use path is seen veering off to the left towards Fallowfield

The Metrolink light rail tram system, first demonstrated on the Fallowfield Line in 1987, eventually came into operation across Greater Manchester in 1992; it made use of several former British Rail lines, converted for light rail operation. Most of the disused Fallowfield Loop was not included in these plans, except for a short stretch of line between Central station and St. Werburgh's Road. This line was to be developed by re-opening the former Cheshire Lines Committee track, which branches off the Fallowfield line south to East Didsbury. It remained disused for many years, due to lack of funding, until July 2011 when a new Metrolink extension was opened to passengers between Deansgate-Castlefield (adjacent to the former Central Station) and St Werburgh's Road. A further Metrolink extension along the Didsbury line opened in May 2013.
