= Debdale Park =

Park in Gorton, Manchester

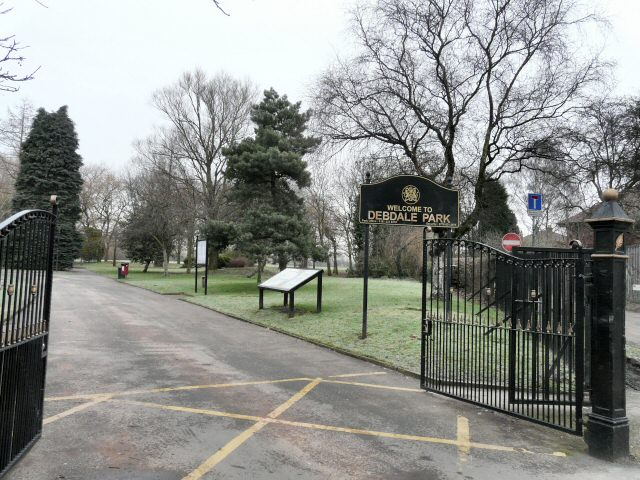
- The main entrance to Debdale Park off Manchester Road.
- Interactive map of Debdale Park
- Location: Gorton, Manchester, England
- Coordinates: 53°27′36″N 2°09′36″W
- Area: 45 acres (18 ha)
- Created: 1843

Debdale Park is an inner-city park, located in the Gorton area of Manchester, England. At around 45 acres (18 ha), it is one of the largest inner-city parks in the City of Manchester.

Located in the grounds of Debdale Park there is a members only bowling green, children's play area, multi-use games area (MUGA), skate park, tennis courts (free for use), football pitch, disused 9 hole pitch and putt, toilets and a visitor & community centre. Close to the park are two large reservoirs for licensed fishing and the neighbouring Debdale Outdoor Centre provides an exciting range of activities include dinghy sailing, windsurfing, canoeing and kayaking, along with indoor climbing, orienteering and team-building activities. In 2021, Debdale Nature Centre and Coffee in the Park were opened behind the offices in the north-west corner of the park.

Debdale Park is also near to the eastern starting point of the Fallowfield Loop shared-use path, a rail trail managed by Sustrans. It follows the route of the former Fallowfield Loop railway line across south Manchester as far as St Werburgh's Road Metrolink station in Chorlton-cum-Hardy. The path is part of the UK National Cycle Network.

== History ==
The land around Debdale Park was originally the property of the local water company, the Manchester and Salford Waterworks Company, who acquired it in the 1820s to provide two reservoirs. In 1851 the Corporation of Manchester purchased the land and reservoirs, expanding the facility southwards in 1874–75 to maintain the local water supplies, and the reservoirs continued to supply the local area until 1963.

After World War I the land around the reservoirs was converted for use as a public park. The City Council expanded the park after the Second World War when it acquired the 18th-Century Gorton House and its estate.

=== Debdale Park Metrolink station ===
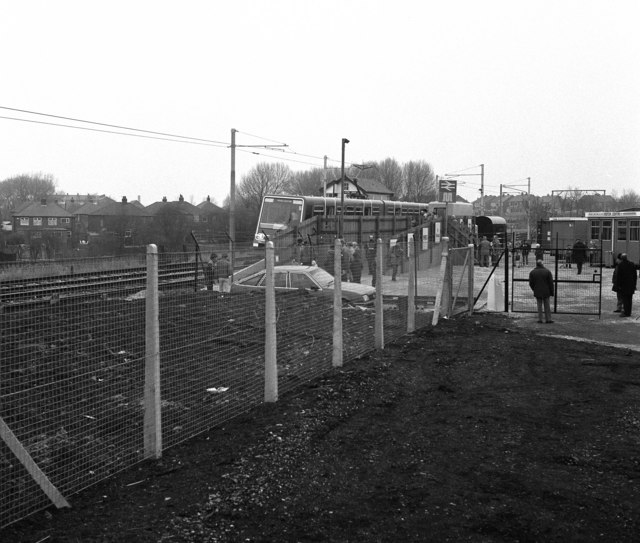
The temporary Debdale Park Metrolink station used for Project Light Rail in 1987

For a few weeks in March 1987, Debdale Park was the name given to a test station which played an important role in the early development of the Manchester Metrolink tram system. Before the present cycle path was created, the Fallowfield Loop railway line running by the park was still in use by freight trains. Shortly before the line was dismantled, a temporary station called Debdale Park was constructed close to the site of the former Hyde Road railway station as part of Project Light Rail, an initiative which was promoting the development of a new light rail/tram network in Manchester. The project borrowed a P86 Docklands Light Railway train prior to its deployment on the new Docklands Light Railway system in East London and ran public demonstration rides along a 1.6-kilometre (0.99 mi) stretch of track, from just north of the Hyde Road junction to just south of the closed Reddish depot. It was the first ever light rail vehicle seen in operation in Manchester.

After the event, Debdale Park Metrolink station was dismantled and the timber platform was used to build the new Hag Fold railway station near Wigan; and the electric overhead line equipment was taken down and re-used at the Heaton Park Tramway on the lakeside extension. The demonstration train, DLR Number 11, was transported to London where it carried the Queen and Prince Philip on the formal opening of the DLR.
