= Hyde Road =

Hyde Road is a section of the A57 road in Manchester, England. The name may refer to:

- Hyde Road Football Stadium, used by Man utd 1887–1923
- Hyde Road (speedway), a stadium used by Belle Vue Aces 1928–1987
- Hyde Road railway station, open 1892–1958
