= Levenshulme South railway station =

Former railway station in England

Levenshulme South
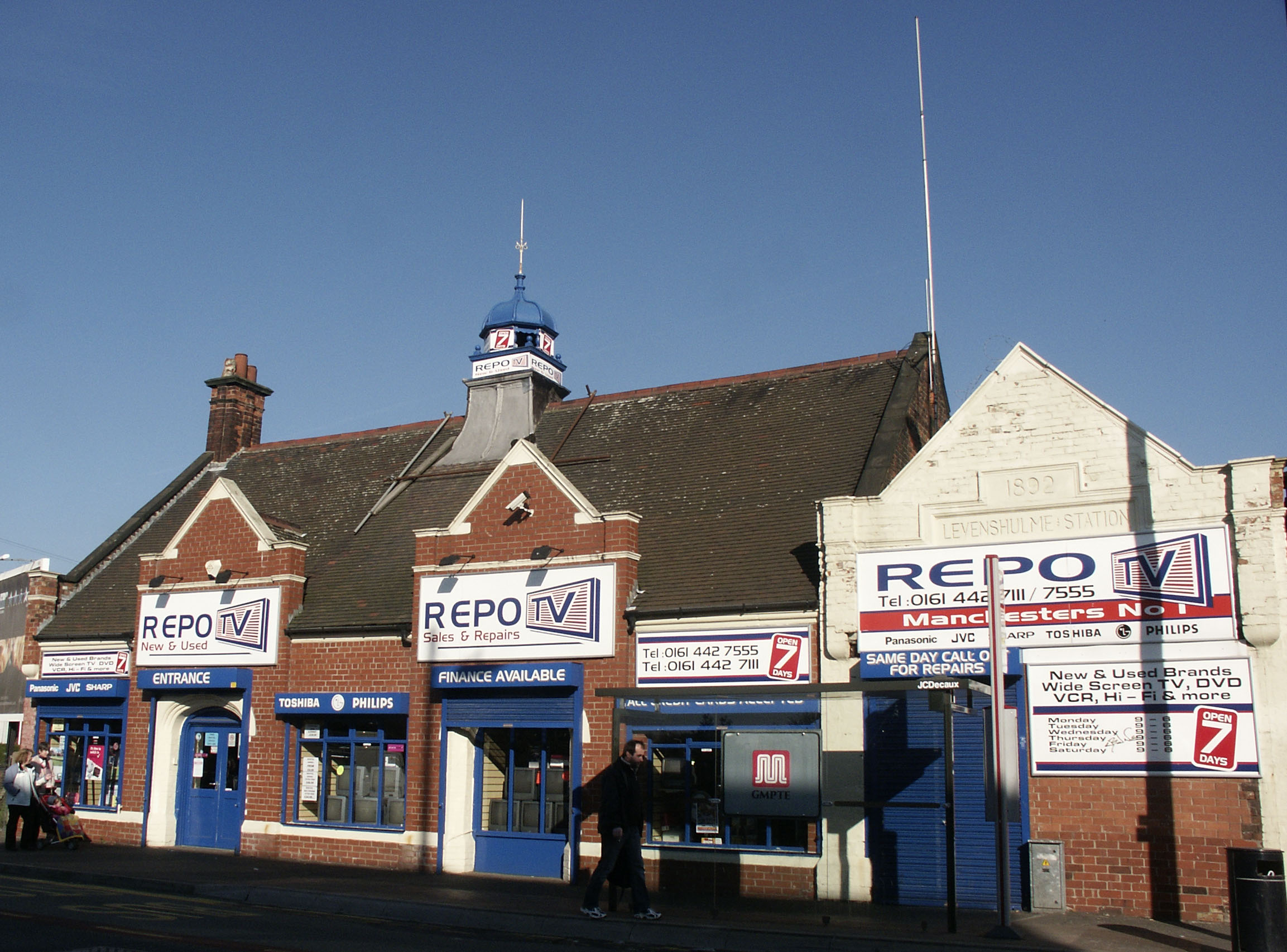
- Levenshulme South; The date of opening plaque can be seen near the white peak on the right

General information
- Location: Levenshulme, Manchester; England
- Coordinates: 53.4408°N 2.1884°W
- Grid reference: SJ876938
- Platforms: 2

Other information
- Status: Disused

History
- Original company: Manchester, Sheffield and Lincolnshire Railway
- Pre-grouping: Great Central Railway
- Post-grouping: London and North Eastern Railway

Key dates
- 2 May 1892: Opened as Levenshulme
- 15 September 1952: Renamed Levenshulme South
- 7 July 1958: Closed
Location

Levenshulme South was a railway station in Levenshulme, Manchester, England, on the Fallowfield Loop railway line, which has since closed and is now a shared-use path.

== Fallowfield Loop ==
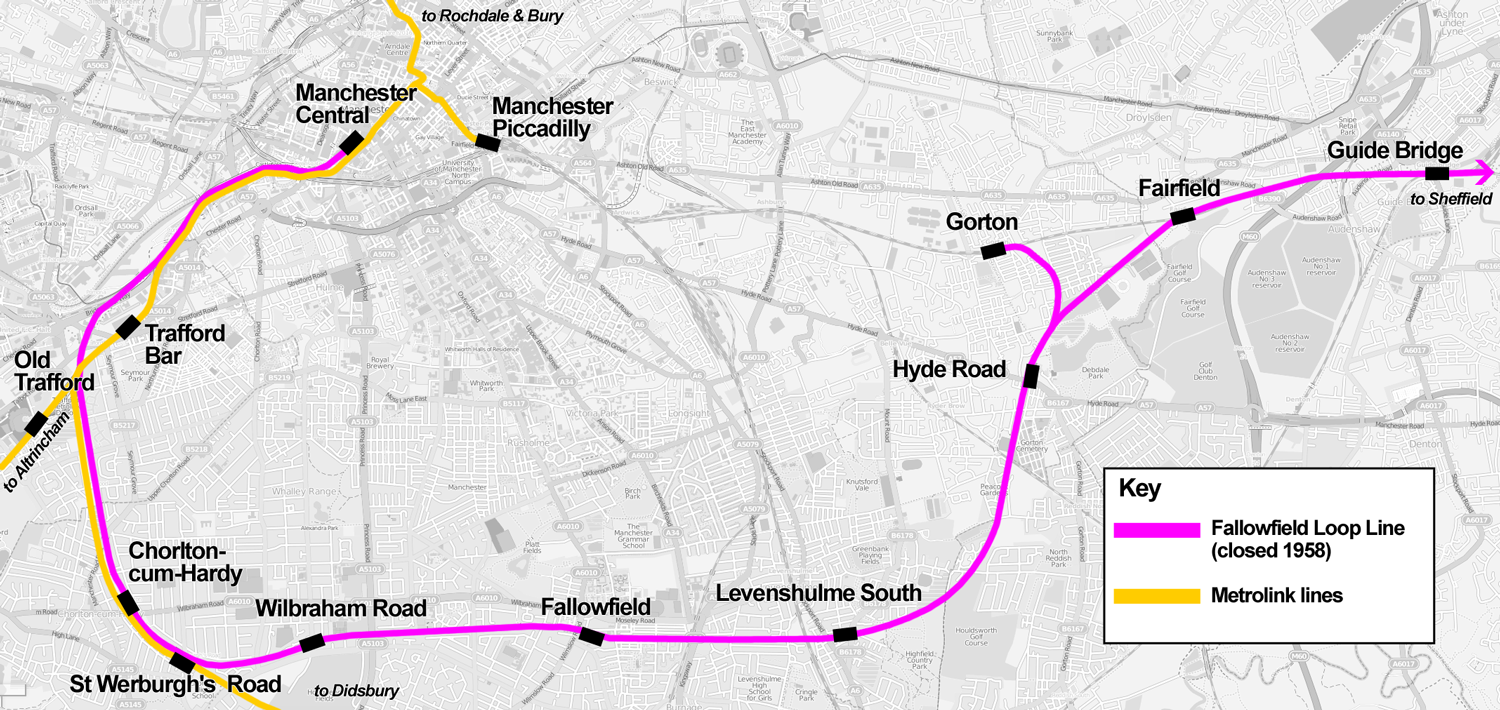
Fallowfield loop line map

== History ==
The station opened on 2 May 1892, originally as Levenshulme; it was renamed Levenshulme South on 15 September 1952. This was one of two stations in Levenshulme; the other, Levenshulme railway station, is still is use today.

The station, was closed to passenger traffic on 7 July 1958;. Express trains continued to pass through until 1969 after which goods trains continued until 1987 when the line was abandoned and the track was taken up in 1988.

== Today ==
Restoration of the station building commenced in 2018 to turn it into Station South, a cycle cafe/bar and urban garden.

The Fallowfield Loop line trackbed is now a popular shared use path for walkers and cyclists.

Preceding station	Disused railways	Following station
Fallowfield	LNER; Manchester, Sheffield and Lincolnshire Railway; Fallowfield Loop	Hyde Road
