= Chorlton tram stop =

Manchester Metrolink tram stop

Chorlton
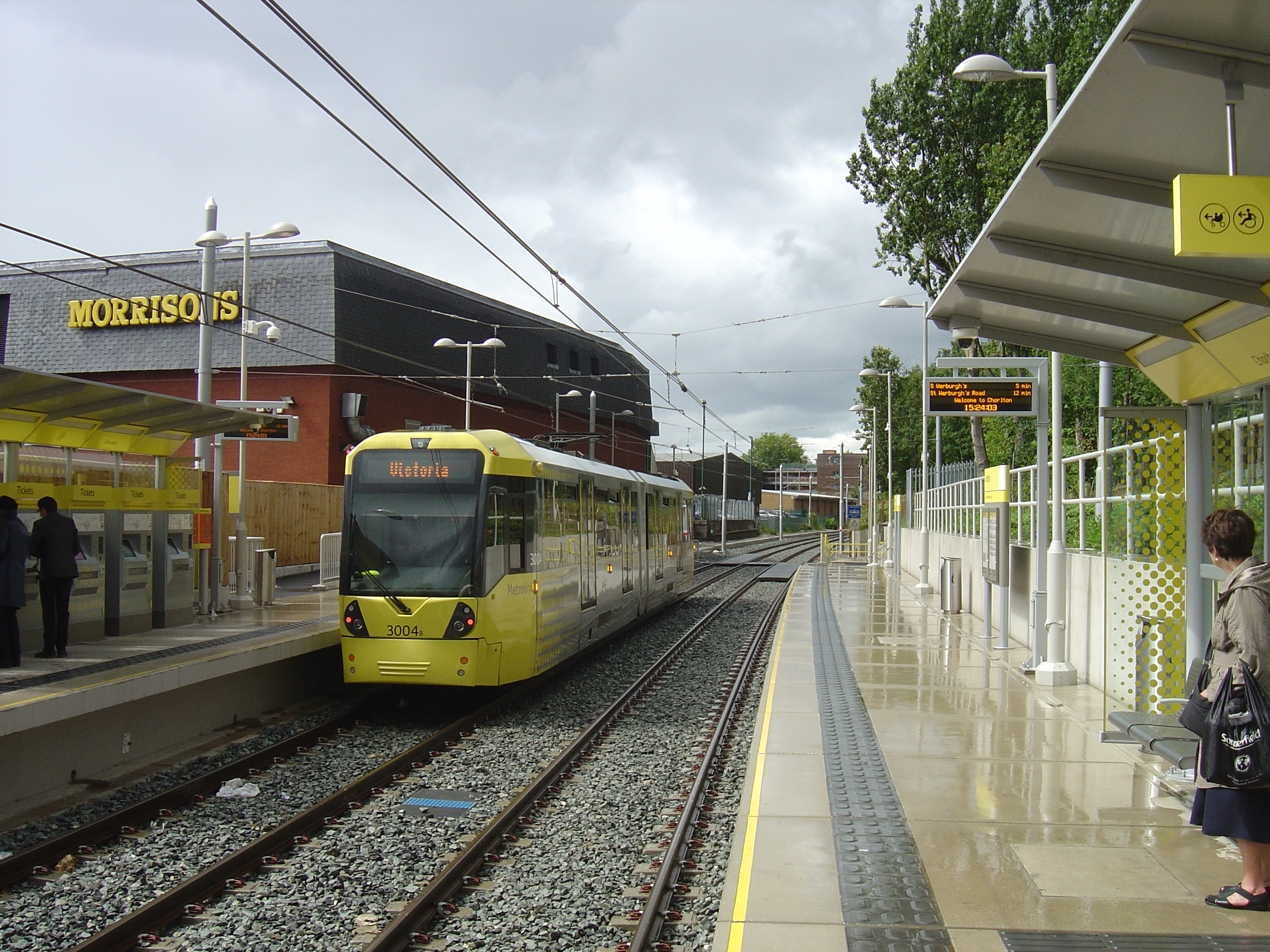

General information
- Location: Chorlton-cum-Hardy, Manchester, England
- Coordinates: 53.44283°N 2.27351°W
- Grid reference: SJ819940
- System: Metrolink station
- Line: South Manchester Line
- Platforms: 2

Other information
- Status: In operation
- Fare zone: 2

History
- Original company: Cheshire Lines Committee
- Pre-grouping: Cheshire Lines Committee
- Post-grouping: Cheshire Lines Committee, British Rail (London Midland Region)

Key dates
- 1 January 1880: Opened
- 2 January 1967: Closed
- 7 July 2011: Reopened
Route map
Location

Chorlton is a stop on the South Manchester and Airport lines of the Metrolink light-rail system in Chorlton-cum-Hardy, Manchester, England. It was built as part of Phase 3a of the network's expansion and opened on 7 July 2011, on a section of the former Cheshire Lines Committee railway.

== History ==
=== Railway station ===
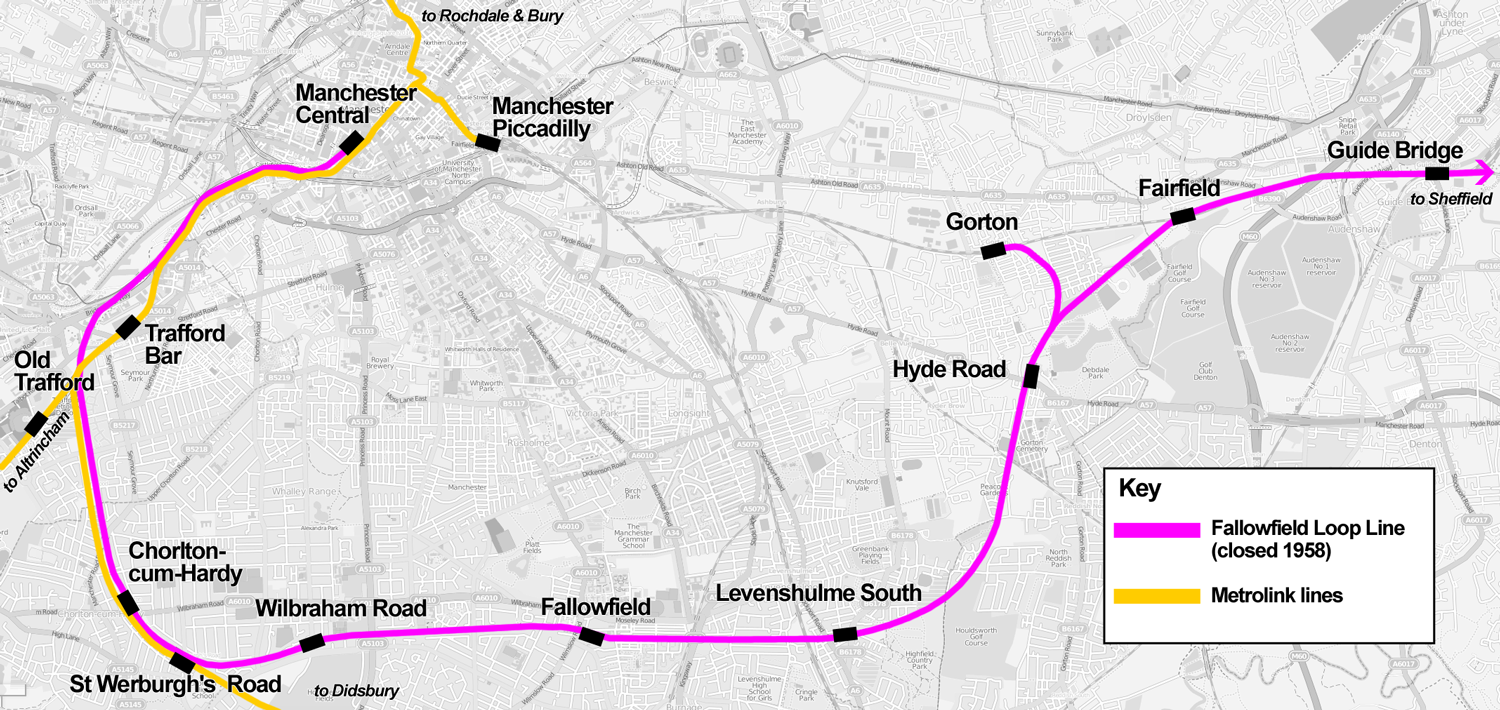
The former Fallowfield loop line

Chorlton-cum-Hardy railway station opened on 1 January 1880 by the Midland Railway on the Manchester South District Railway. It later formed part of the Cheshire Lines Committee and closed on 2 January 1967, as part of the Beeching Axe, though the line through Fallowfield remained open to freight until 1988. Until the mid-20th century, the station yard supplied coal to the district. Land to the north-east of the track, originally acquired for the purpose of doubling it, was eventually sold off for development.

The station was mentioned in the 1964 song "Slow Train" by Flanders and Swann, which was written to lament the loss of stations resulting from the Beeching cuts:

No churns, no porter, no cat on a seat,
At Chorlton-cum-Hardy or Chester-le-Street.

Chorlton station was subsequently demolished and a Morrisons (originally Safeway) supermarket and car park built in its place; the track bed remained extant to the side of the supermarket and part of one of the platforms survives next to the supermarket building. The derelict line became overgrown until 2001, when the track bed of the old Fallowfield Loop Line branch running east of Chorlton towards Alexandra Park and Fallowfield was converted to the Fallowfield Loop shared-use path. The route is run by Sustrans and forms part of Routes 6 and 60 of the National Cycle Network. The remaining Cheshire Lines Committee lines, from Chorlton from Manchester Central towards Didsbury, remained disused and overgrown for another ten years.

=== Manchester Metrolink station ===
Proposals to link Chorlton to a light rail system had been put forward since the 1980s, but remained unfunded for over 20 years. The extension that was originally proposed would have taken over the disused tracks of the Cheshire Lines Committee as far as East Didsbury.

In 2006, it was announced that the first phase of the Big Bang Metrolink expansion project (Phase 3A) would go ahead, including the extension to St Werburgh's Road. Following the rejection of the Greater Manchester Transport Innovation Fund in a public referendum in 2008, extension of the line to East Didsbury (Phase 3B) was completed with funding from national and local government.

Construction of the line began in April 2009 and it opened in July 2011. The first services towards East Didsbury began in June 2013.

== Services ==
Chorlton is served by the three tram lines:

- Rochdale Town Centre to East Didsbury
- Shaw and Crompton to East Didsbury
- Manchester Victoria to Manchester Airport.

Each line operates at a frequency of one tram every 12 minutes, providing a combined frequency of approximately one tram every four minutes in both directions. On the Rochdale to East Didsbury line, the last evening north-bound services (the last 2–3 dependent on day of week) terminate at Manchester Victoria.

Before the East Didsbury extension was completed in May 2013, south-eastbound services terminated at St Werburgh's Road. An extension from there to Manchester Airport was opened on 3 November 2014. St Werburgh's Road is an interchange station for services between the East Didsbury and Manchester Airport forks of the line. Northbound trams from Manchester Airport terminate at Manchester Victoria.

Preceding station	Manchester Metrolink	Following station
St Werburgh's Road towards East Didsbury	East Didsbury–Rochdale	Firswood towards Rochdale Town Centre
St Werburgh's Road towards East Didsbury	East Didsbury–Shaw (peak only)	Firswood towards Shaw and Crompton
St Werburgh's Road towards Manchester Airport	Manchester Airport–Victoria	Firswood towards Victoria
Disused railways
Manchester Central; Line and station closed	Great Central Railway; Fallowfield Loop	Wilbraham Road; Line and station closed
Manchester Central; Line and station closed	Midland Railway; South District Railway	Withington and West Didsbury; Line and station closed

== Connecting bus routes ==
The station is served by several Stagecoach Manchester bus services outside the stop or in the centre of Chorlton:

- Service 23/23A/25 which run to the Trafford Centre and Stockport
- 24 runs to Stockport and MediaCityUK
- 85 runs eastbound to Manchester
- 86 to Manchester
- 168 runs to Ashton-under-Lyne, via Fallowfield, Longsight, Gorton and Droylsden
- 276 runs to Withington Community Hospital and to Trafford General Hospital, via Stretford.

== Gallery ==
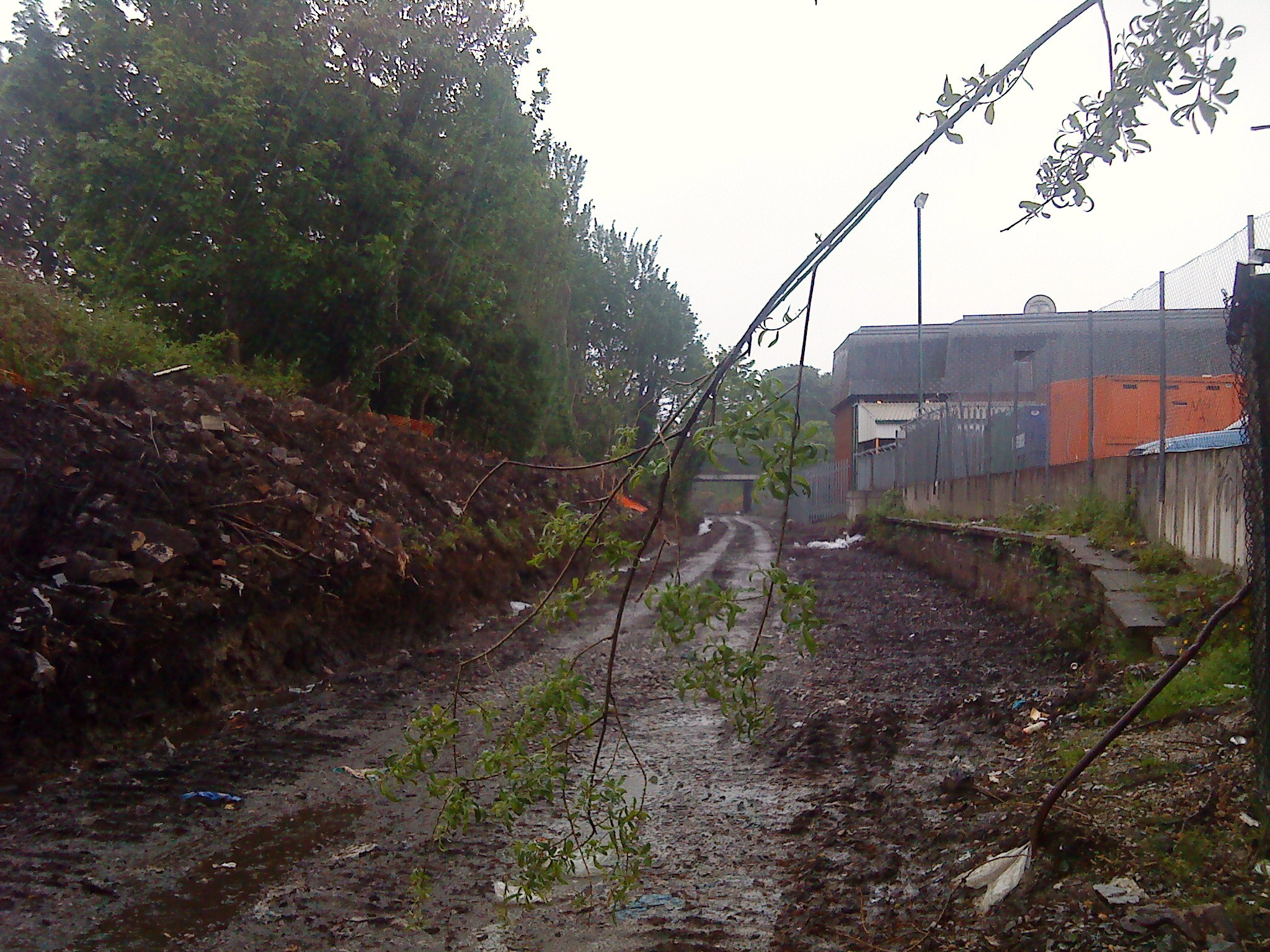
The derelict station awaiting redevelopment

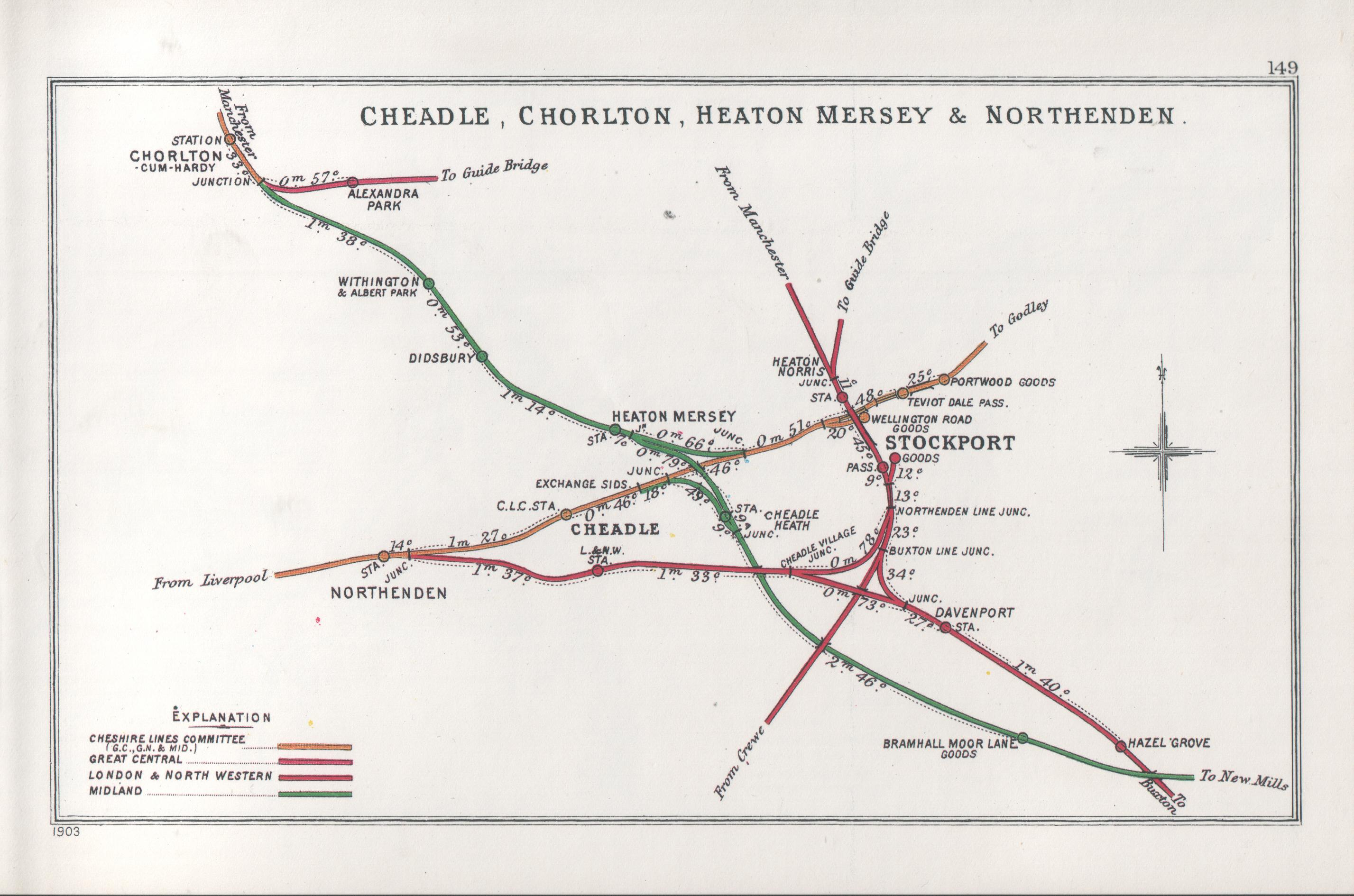
A 1914 map of South Manchester railways

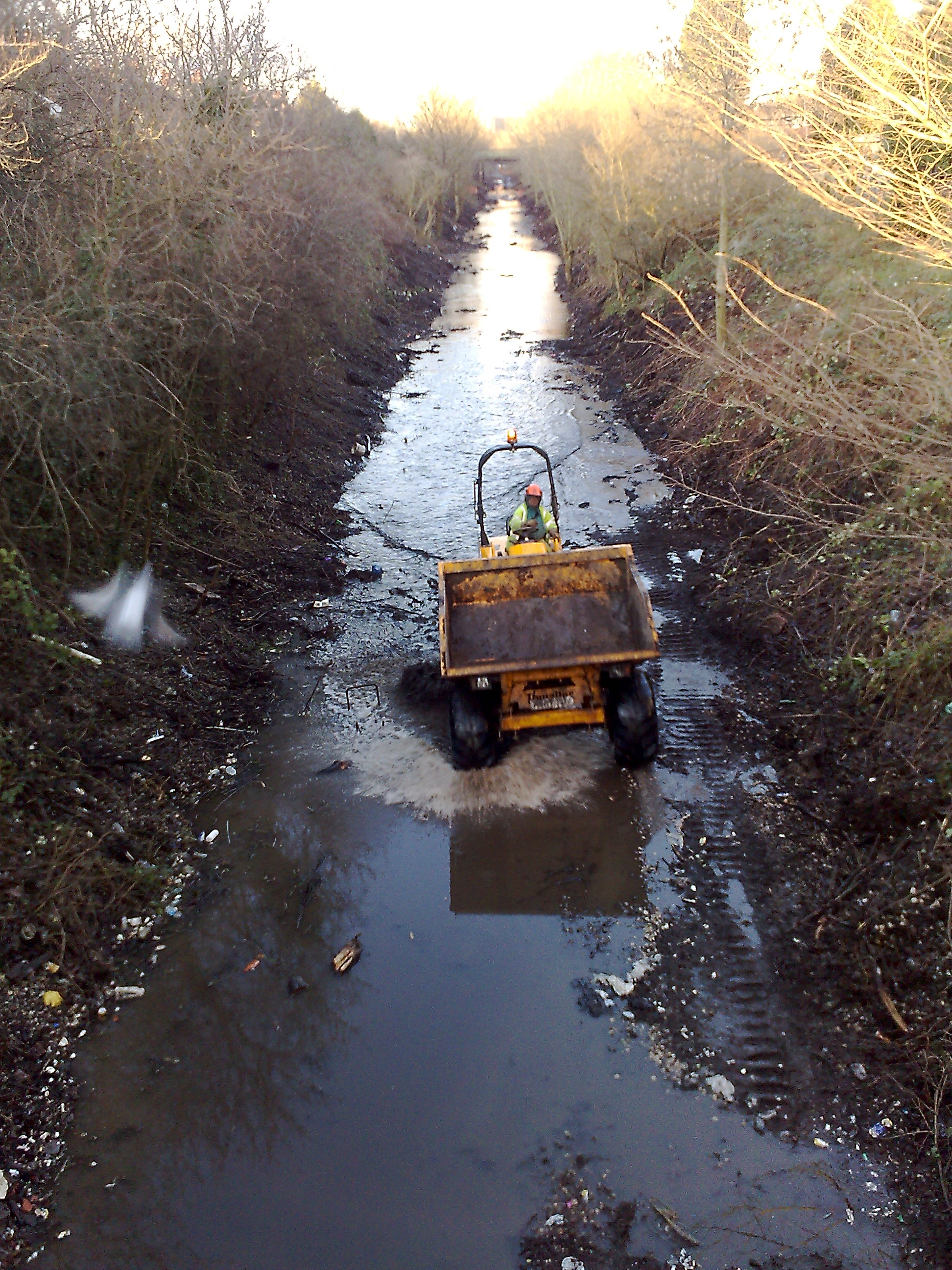
Metrolink construction work on the line near Chorlton

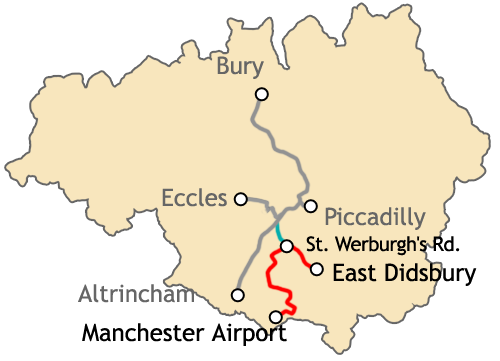
Map of the planned South Manchester line extensions

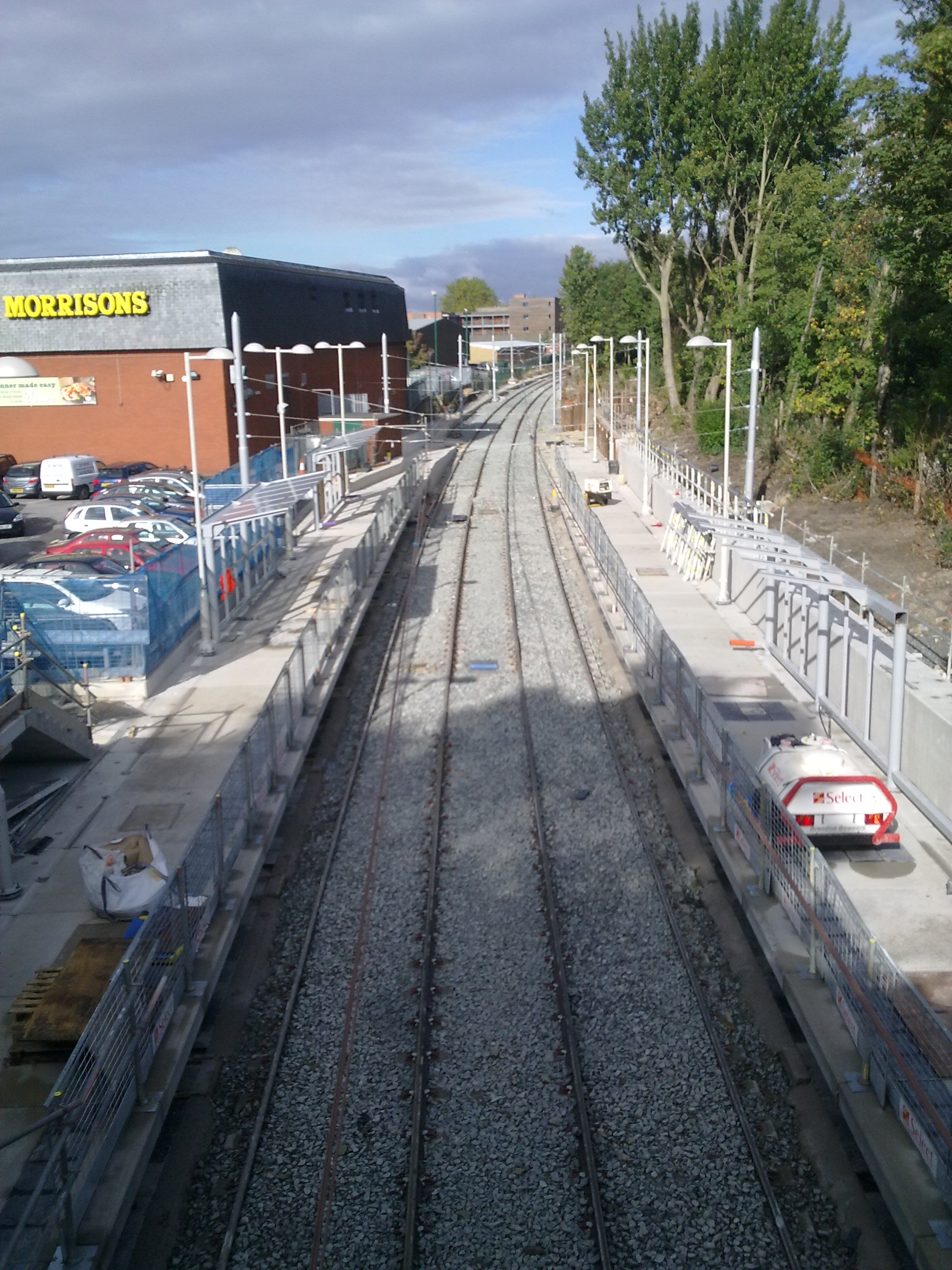
The tram stop in October 2010
