= Fairfield railway station (England) =

Railway station in Greater Manchester, England

Coordinates: 53.471°N 2.145°W

Fairfield
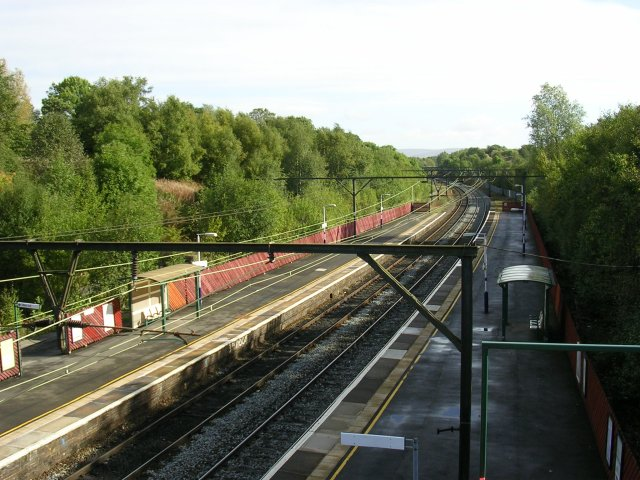

General information
- Location: Droylsden, Tameside; England
- Grid reference: SJ904971
- Manager: Northern
- Platforms: 2

Other information
- Station code: FRF
- Classification: DfT category F2

Key dates
- 1841: First station opened
- 1892: Resited
- 6 May 1974: Renamed from Fairfield for Droylsden

Passengers
- 2021/22: ▲14,026
- 2022/23: ▲16,572
- 2023/24: ▲21,728
- 2024/25: ▲25,986
- 2025/26: ▲28,268
Location
Notes
- Passenger statistics from the Office of Rail and Road

Fairfield railway station serves the Fairfield area of Droylsden, Tameside, Greater Manchester and is located 3.1 miles (5 km) east of Manchester Piccadilly station. It was opened by the Manchester, Sheffield & Lincolnshire Railway in 1892, when the Fallowfield Loop to Manchester Central opened; it replaced an earlier station that had opened on the line in 1841, west of the present site.

== History ==
Fairfield station, originally known as Fairfield for Droylsden, was a junction with a pair of lines from the east breaking off and running to the south; this thereby facilitated a route, called the Fallowfield Loop, to Longsight, south Manchester and Manchester Central station. By means of a switchback to Gorton and Openshaw station, this branch enabled the turning round of locomotives without need for a turntable in the area. This could have been invaluable for servicing both the Guide Bridge yards and the facilities of Gorton and Beyer, Peacock & Company locomotive factories. The Fallowfield Loop line was closed to passenger services in July 1958 and to all traffic in 1988.

The station currently has two platforms but, for many years, it had six, with two island platforms and two side platforms. Two were used for local services; two for Woodhead Line express services between Manchester Piccadilly and Sheffield Victoria; and two for services and movements to Reddish Electric Depot via the Fallowfield Loop.

The station name was changed from Fairfield for Droylsden to Fairfield on 6 May 1974.

== Facilities ==
The amenities offered at the unstaffed station are very basic; there are no permanent buildings other than waiting shelters on each platform and there is only one ticket machine on the Manchester-bound platform. Train running information is provided by telephone and timetable posters.

No step-free access is provided, with only staircases in place to the main entrance from both platforms.

== Services ==
At Fairfield, there is an hourly service in each direction between Manchester Piccadilly and Rose Hill Marple, via Guide Bridge; the evening service is limited and there is no Sunday service.

Glossop Line trains do not serve Fairfield, running fast between Ashburys and Guide Bridge.

Preceding station	National Rail	Following station
Guide Bridge	Northern Hope Valley Line Mondays-Saturdays only	Gorton
Guide Bridge	Northern Hope Valley Line Mondays-Saturdays only	Manchester Piccadilly
	Disused railways	
Guide Bridge; Line and station open	Great Central Railway; Fallowfield Loop	Hyde Road; Line and station closed
