= Ashburys railway station =

Railway station in Greater Manchester, England

Coordinates: 53°28′18.5″N 2°11′42″W

Ashburys
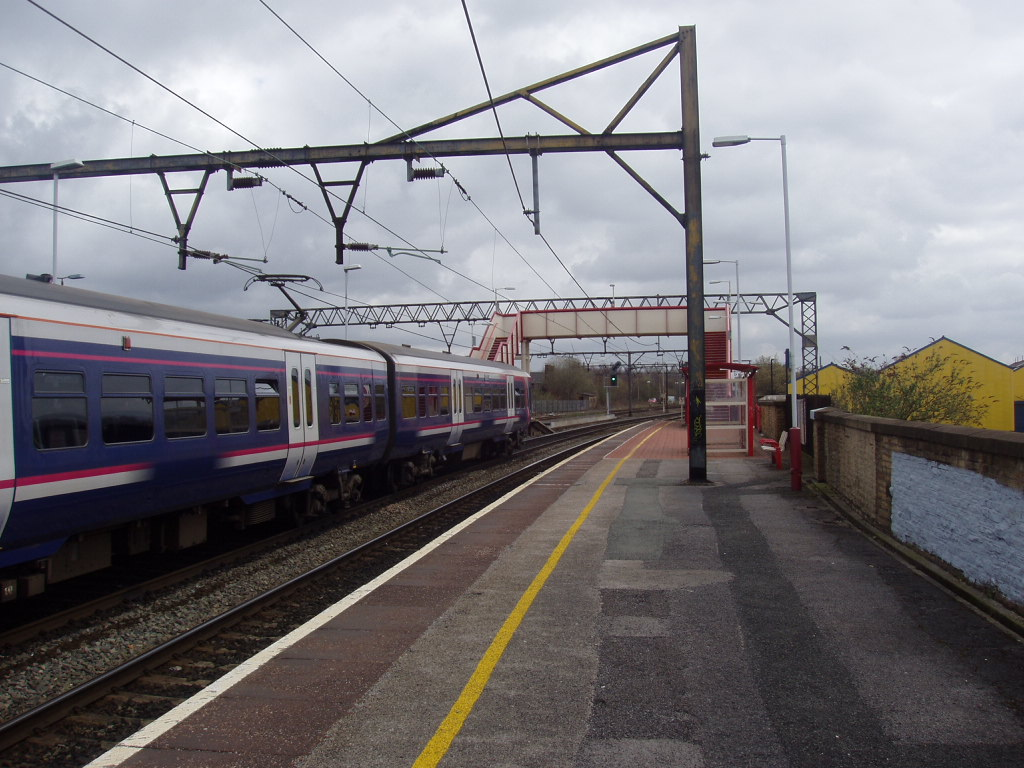
- A Northern Rail electric multiple unit passing Ashburys station in 2006

General information
- Location: Openshaw, Greater Manchester, England
- Grid reference: SJ871972
- Managed by: Northern Trains
- Platforms: 2

Other information
- Station code: ABY
- Classification: DfT category F2

Key dates
- July 1855: Station opens as Ashburys
- November 1855: Station renamed Ashburys for Openshaw
- August 1856: Station renamed Ashburys for Belle Vue
- Date unknown: Station renamed Ashburys

Passengers
- 2020/21: ▼35,190
- 2021/22: ▲65,502
- 2022/23: ▲65,988
- 2023/24: ▲89,420
- 2024/25: ▲0.105 million
Location
Notes
- Passenger statistics from the Office of Rail and Road

Ashburys railway station serves the area of Openshaw, in Greater Manchester, England. It is a stop on a junction of the Glossop Line, the Hope Valley Line and the freight line to Phillips Park Junction. It has been open since 1855 and is the nearest station to the City of Manchester Stadium.

== History ==
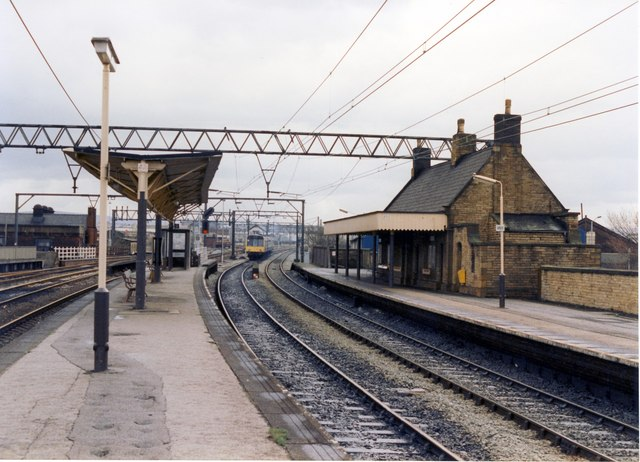
Ashburys station in 1989

The station was built and opened in 1855 by the Sheffield, Ashton-under-Lyne and Manchester Railway, on its line from Manchester Store Street to Sheffield Victoria. First appearing in Bradshaw's Guide in July, it was referred to as Ashburys for Openshaw in November and then as Ashburys for Belle Vue in August 1856.

There is no place of this name near this station. It was named after the Ashbury Railway Carriage & Iron Company, which built it for £175 in 1855. This company flourished from 1841 until 1902, when it moved to Saltley in Birmingham, merging with the Metropolitan Amalgamated Railway Carriage & Wagon Company. Examples of its rolling stock survive to this day on preserved railways all over the world.

It became part of the Manchester, Sheffield & Lincolnshire Railway following mergers in 1847, changing its name to the Great Central Railway (GCR) in 1897. Joining the London and North Eastern Railway during the Grouping of 1923, the station passed on to the London Midland Region of British Railways on nationalisation in 1948.

East of the station, towards Gorton and Belle Vue, there were two engine sheds. The larger was the GCR's Gorton loco shed (1879–1965) and the smaller was the Midland Railway's Belle Vue locomotive shed (1870–1956). The Gorton shed had a ferro-concrete coaling tower.

When sectorisation was introduced in the 1980s, the station was served by Regional Railways under arrangement with the Greater Manchester PTE until the privatisation of British Rail. The main station buildings, subway and a third platform face survived until the end of the 1980s, but all have since been removed.

=== Electrification and signalling ===
The line was electrified at 25 kV AC on 10 December 1984; it replaced the 1500 V DC electrification, which was inaugurated on 14 June 1954 by British Railways as part of the Manchester-Sheffield-Wath scheme via the Woodhead Tunnel. There was also a signal box here, which controlled the junctions and various sidings; it opened in 1906 by the GCR and was closed in 2011, when control was transferred to the Manchester East signalling control centre. The new West Coast Main Line North Rail Operating Centre is located a short distance east of the station, next to the line to Guide Bridge. This opened in 2014 (Note: The Rail Operating Centre was one of 11 such centres either built or being planned in the UK) and now controls signalling across most of the routes across the North West England, including the northern end of the West Coast Main Line and the entire Manchester area network.

== Facilities ==
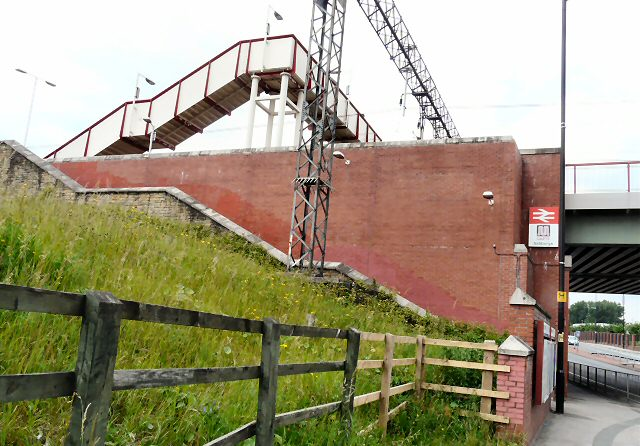
Street entrance to the station, from the A6010 Pottery Lane

The station is unstaffed and has no permanent buildings, other than standard waiting shelters, or ticket provision, so all tickets must be bought on the train or prior to travel. Train running information is provided by digital display screens and timetable posters. No step-free access is available, as the station is above street level; the only access offered is via staircase and footbridge.

== Services ==
Northern Trains provides the following services that stop at Ashburys:

- Half-hourly trains between Manchester Piccadilly and Hadfield on the Glossop line
- Hourly services between Manchester Piccadilly and New Mills Central on the Hope Valley Line, via Reddish North; there is one service in each direction on Sunday
- Approximately hourly services between Manchester Piccadilly and Rose Hill Marple on the Hope Valley Line, via Guide Bridge; there is no service on Sunday.

Other services pass frequently through the station without stopping.

| Preceding station | National Rail | Following station |
|---|---|---|
| Gorton | Northern Trains Hope Valley Line | Manchester Piccadilly |
| Belle Vue | Northern Trains Hope Valley Line | Manchester Piccadilly |
| Ardwick Limited Service | Northern Trains Hope Valley Line | Manchester Piccadilly |
| Guide Bridge | Northern Trains Glossop line | Manchester Piccadilly |

== Future ==
Under the Greater Manchester Transport Innovation Fund (TIF) programme, Ashburys would have received improvements. However, despite TIF not going ahead, it is still to receive safety, security and passenger information improvements, when funding can be obtained.

Other long term proposals include the Manchester-Marple Tram/Train scheme, which was on a reserve list of TIF projects. Significant new infrastructure works would be required between Piccadilly and Ashburys, known as Piccadilly Link. It would be incorporated within a major mixed-use development by Grangefield Estates, known as Chancellor Place, around the former Manchester Mayfield station site.
