= Belle Vue railway station =

Railway station in Greater Manchester, England

Coordinates: 53°27′43″N 2°10′49″W

Belle Vue
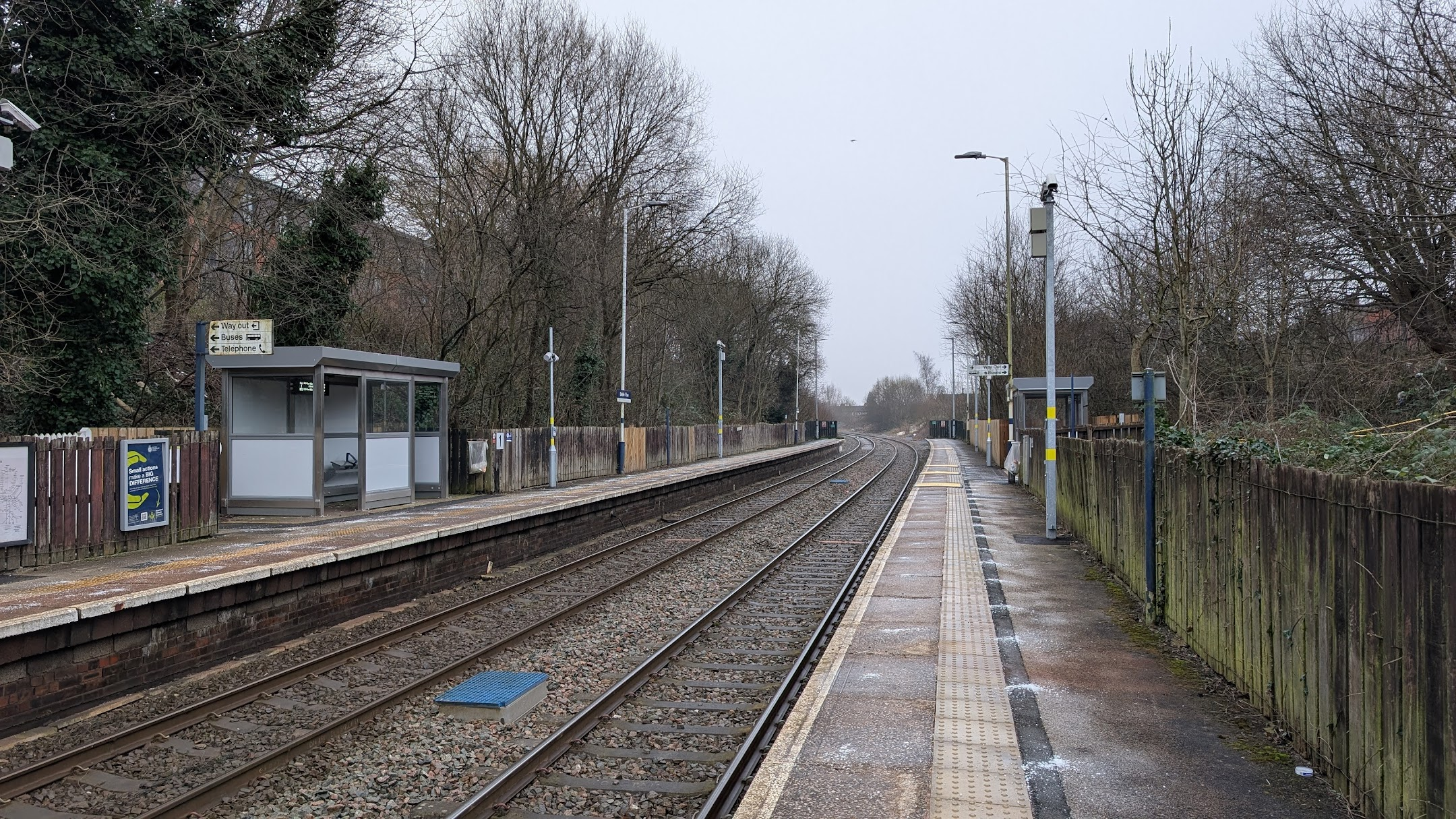
- Belle Vue station in 2025

General information
- Location: Gorton, Manchester, England
- Grid reference: SJ881961
- Manager: Northern Trains
- Platforms: 2

Other information
- Station code: BLV
- Classification: DfT category F2

History
- Opened: 1875

Passengers
- 2021/22: ▲8,644
- 2022/23: ▼6,544
- 2023/24: ▲12,580
- 2024/25: ▲15,288
- 2025/26: ▲19,932
Location
Notes
- Passenger statistics from the Office of Rail and Road

Belle Vue railway station serves the area of Belle Vue, in Greater Manchester, England. It is a stop on the Hope Valley Line for services between Manchester Piccadilly and New Mills Central.

== History ==
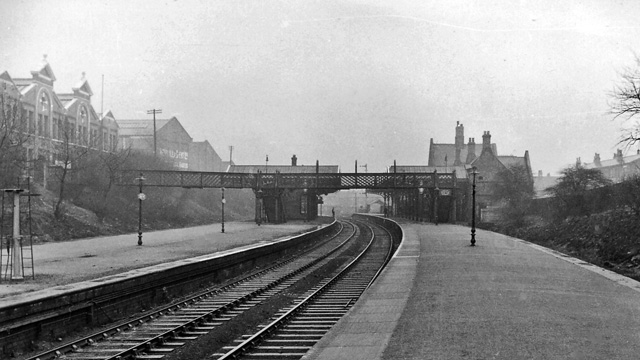
Belle Vue station in 1962

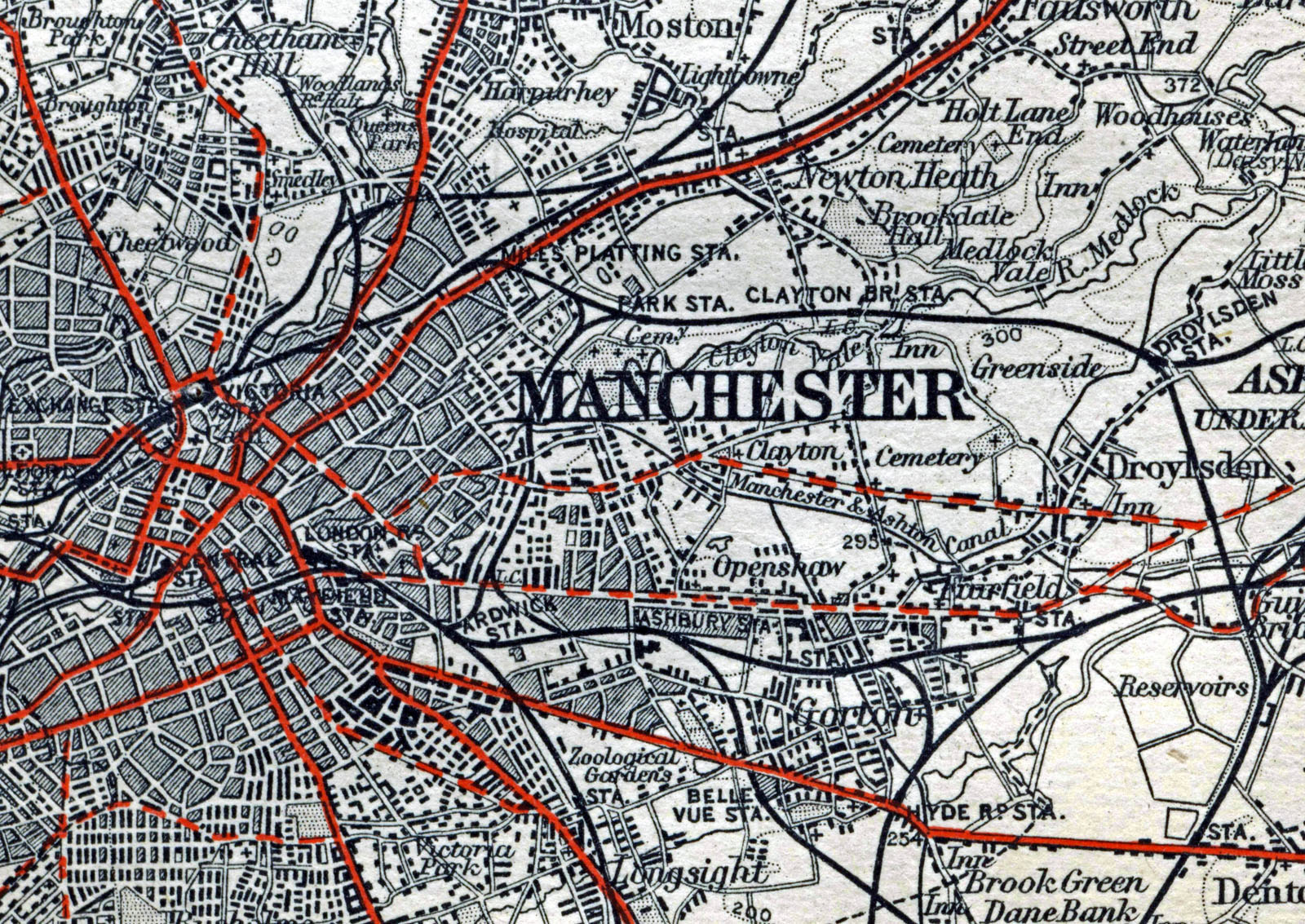
A 1911 map showing the location of the station (lower centre)

The station was built by the Sheffield and Midland Railway Companies' Committee and opened on 1 September 1875. It was located on the line between New Mills Central and Manchester London Road (now Piccadilly).

A joint venture of the Manchester, Sheffield and Lincolnshire Railway and the Midland Railway, it was a shorter route than the already existing one through Hyde Junction. It was used by the latter's main line expresses from London St Pancras until 1880, when they began running via Stockport Tiviot Dale into Manchester Central.

It was popular with visitors to Belle Vue Zoological Gardens, set up by John Jennison in 1836. After the zoo's closure in the early 1980s, usage of the station plummeted. All that remains of the original station is that part of the footbridge which crosses the running lines.

== Facilities ==
The original station had four platforms. The main building with booking office and parcels office was located on the west side of the railway and the platforms were linked by a raised footbridge.

Only two platforms remain in 2017, whilst there are no surviving buildings present other than standard waiting shelters on each platform. Train running information is offered via timetable posters and telephone. No step-free access available, as entry and exit on both sides is via a pair of stepped ramps from the main road.

== Services ==
Northern Trains operates an hourly service in each direction between Manchester Piccadilly and New Mills Central on Mondays-Saturdays. There is no Sunday service.

| Preceding station | National Rail | Following station |
|---|---|---|
| Ryder Brow | Northern Trains Hope Valley Line Mondays-Saturdays only | Ashburys |
