= Gorton railway station =

Railway station in Greater Manchester, England

Coordinates: 53°28′8″N 2°10′4″W

Gorton
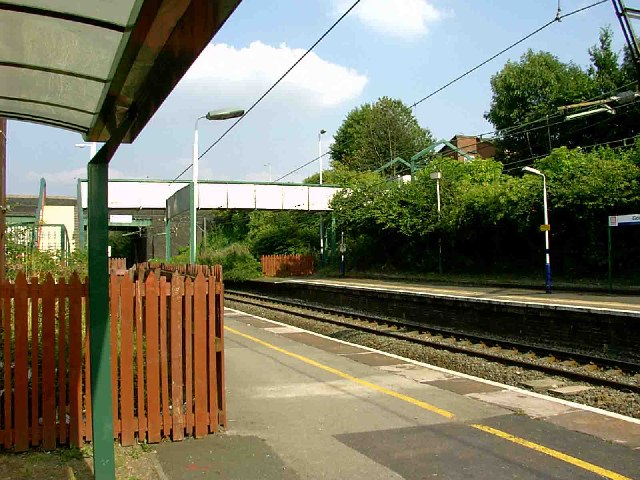
- Gorton railway station in 2005

General information
- Location: Gorton, Manchester; England
- Grid reference: SJ889969
- Manager: Northern Trains
- Transit authority: Greater Manchester
- Platforms: 2

Other information
- Station code: GTO
- Classification: DfT category E

History
- Original company: Sheffield, Ashton-under-Lyne and Manchester Railway
- Pre-grouping: Great Central Railway
- Post-grouping: London and North Eastern Railway

Key dates
- 23 May 1842: Opened as Gorton
- 25 August 1906: Resited and renamed Gorton and Openshaw
- 1 May 1926: Renamed Gorton

Passengers
- 2021/22: ▲51,966
- 2022/23: ▼51,942
- 2023/24: ▲59,764
- 2024/25: ▼58,130
- 2025/26: ▲62,678
Location
Notes
- Passenger statistics from the Office of Rail and Road

Gorton railway station serves the Gorton district of the city of Manchester, England. It is sited 2 1/2 miles (4.0 km) east of Manchester Piccadilly. The station is a stop on the Glossop and Hope Valley lines; Northern Trains operate all services that stop here and also manage the station.

== History ==
The station was opened by the Great Central Railway (GCR) on 25 August 1906, replacing an earlier station sited 200 yards (180 m) to the east that had opened on the line on 23 May 1842. From 1 January 1923, it was operated by the London and North Eastern Railway (LNER).

It was sited on the busy Woodhead Route to Sheffield Victoria and had four platforms. From its opening, the station was named Gorton and Openshaw; it reverted to its original name by 1977. Only two platforms now remain in use.

It was referred to as Openshaw in the 1964 song "Slow Train" by Flanders and Swann.

== Facilities ==
The station has a ticket office, which is staffed on a part-time basis six days per week (06:25-13:30 weekdays, 07:00-14:10 Saturdays). At other times, tickets must be purchased in advance or on the train. There are no permanent buildings left at platform level other than basic waiting shelters. Train running information is offered via timetable posters, digital CIS displays and telephone. Step-free access is available to both platforms via ramps from the entrance and footbridge.

== Services ==
There are generally two trains per hour in each direction on the Hope Valley Line between Manchester Piccadilly and Rose Hill Marple on Mondays-Saturdays, with limited late evening services. There is no service on this line on Sundays.

There are only a small number of early morning, rush hour and late evening services on the Glossop line between Manchester Piccadilly, Glossop and Hadfield; however, there is an hourly service on Sundays.

Preceding station	National Rail	Following station
Ashburys	Northern Trains Hope Valley Line; Hyde Loop	Fairfield
Ashburys	Northern Trains Glossop line Limited service	Guide Bridge
	Disused railways	
Ashburys; Line and station open	Great Central Railway; Fallowfield Loop	Hyde Road; Line and station closed
