= Levenshulme railway station =

Railway station in Greater Manchester, England

Coordinates: 53°26′40″N 2°11′34″W

Levenshulme
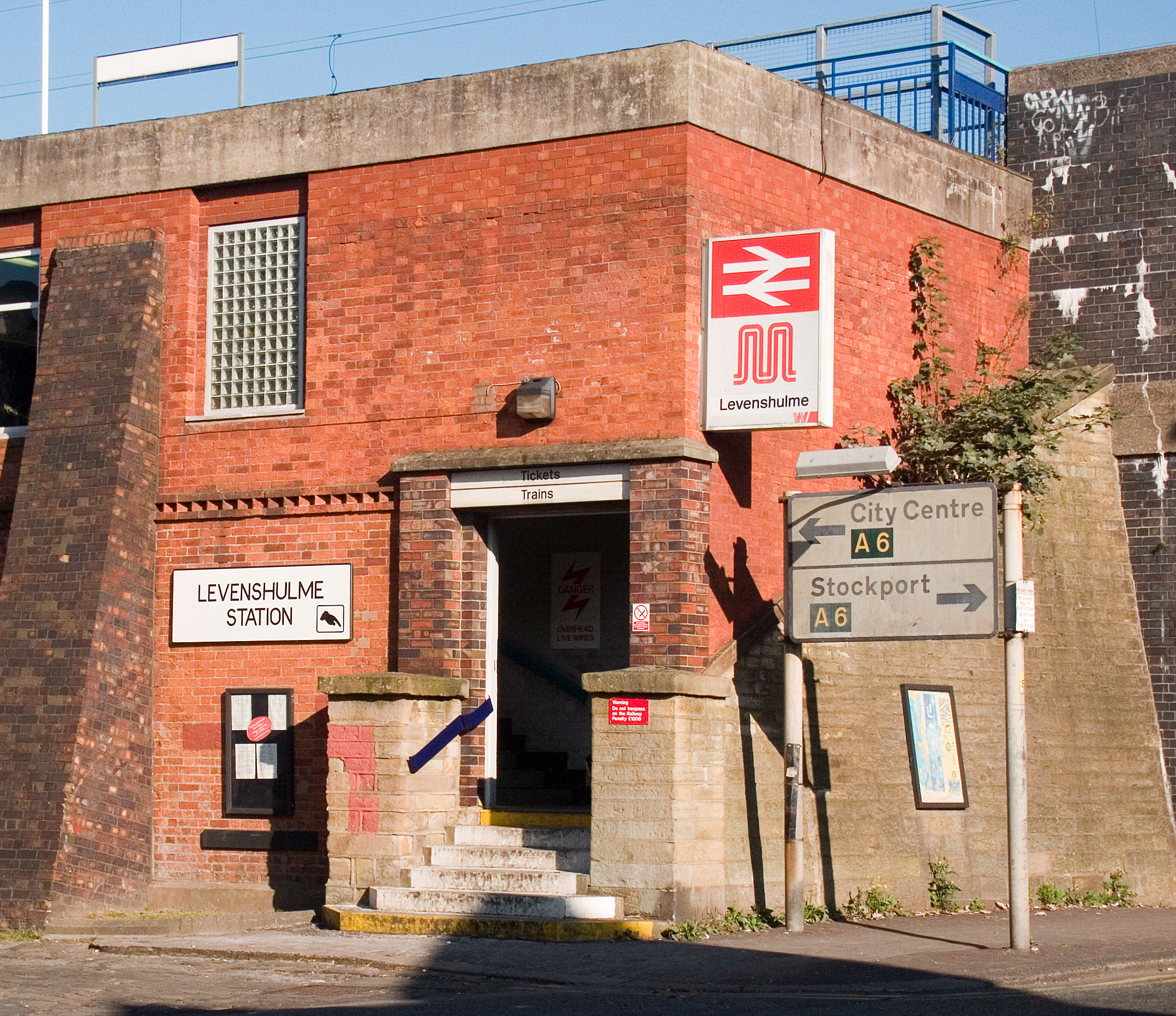
- Front entrance to Levenshulme Railway Station

General information
- Location: Levenshulme, Manchester; England
- Grid reference: SJ872941
- Managed by: Northern Trains
- Transit authority: Transport for Greater Manchester
- Platforms: 2
- Tracks: 4

Other information
- Station code: LVM
- Classification: DfT category E

History
- Opened: ??? As Levenshulme and Burnage

Key dates
- 1 July 1910: Station name changed to Levenshulme

Passengers
- 2020/21: ▼0.140 million
- 2021/22: ▲0.384 million
- 2022/23: ▲0.408 million
- 2023/24: ▲0.454 million
- 2024/25: ▲0.472 million
Location
Notes
- Passenger statistics from the Office of Rail and Road

Levenshulme railway station is in Levenshulme, Manchester, England. The station is 3.1 miles (5 km) south east of Manchester Piccadilly towards Stockport.

Four tracks go through the station, with the centre tracks used by fast trains and the outer by stopping trains.

== Services ==
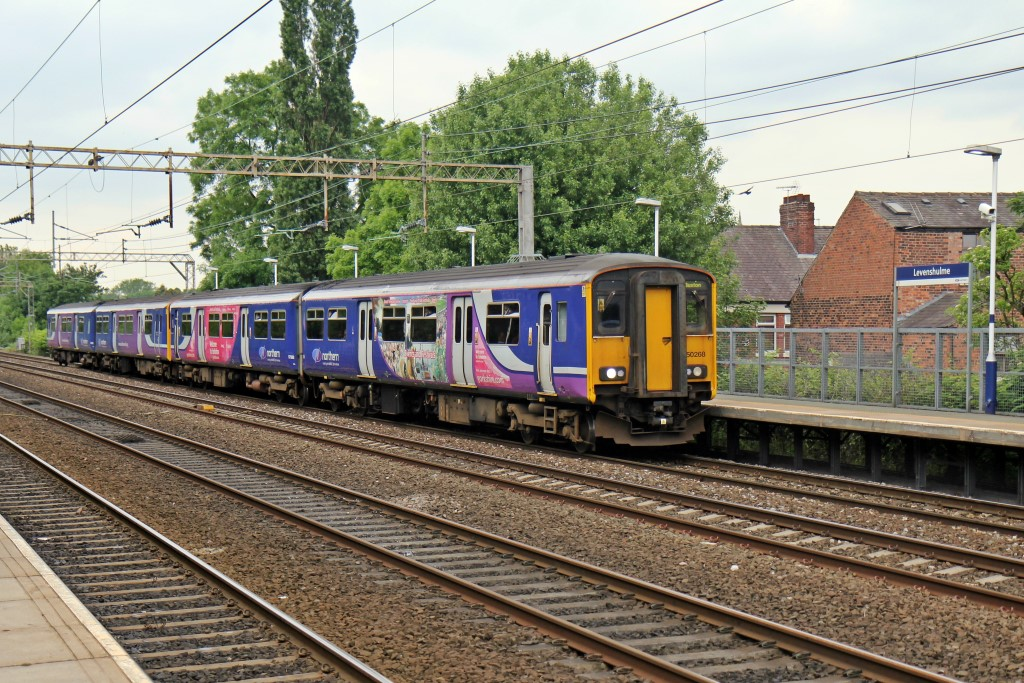
A Northern Rail Class 150 stops at the station.

As of December 2022, there are four trains per hour from Levenshulme in each direction during off-peak weekday hours and all day Saturdays. All northbound services run to Manchester Piccadilly. Southbound, 1 train per hour runs to each of Alderley Edge, Crewe, Hazel Grove and Buxton.

On Sundays, the service is reduced to 1 train per hour between Manchester Piccadilly and Buxton.

Preceding station	National Rail	Following station
Heaton Chapel	Northern Trains Crewe–Manchester line Monday to Saturday	Manchester Piccadilly
Heaton Chapel	Northern Trains Buxton line	Manchester Piccadilly

== Signage ==
As well as English, the platform signs give the station name in Irish and Urdu, reflecting the immigrant communities from Ireland and Pakistan which live in the area.
