= St Werburgh's Road tram stop =

Manchester Metrolink tram stop

St Werburgh's Road
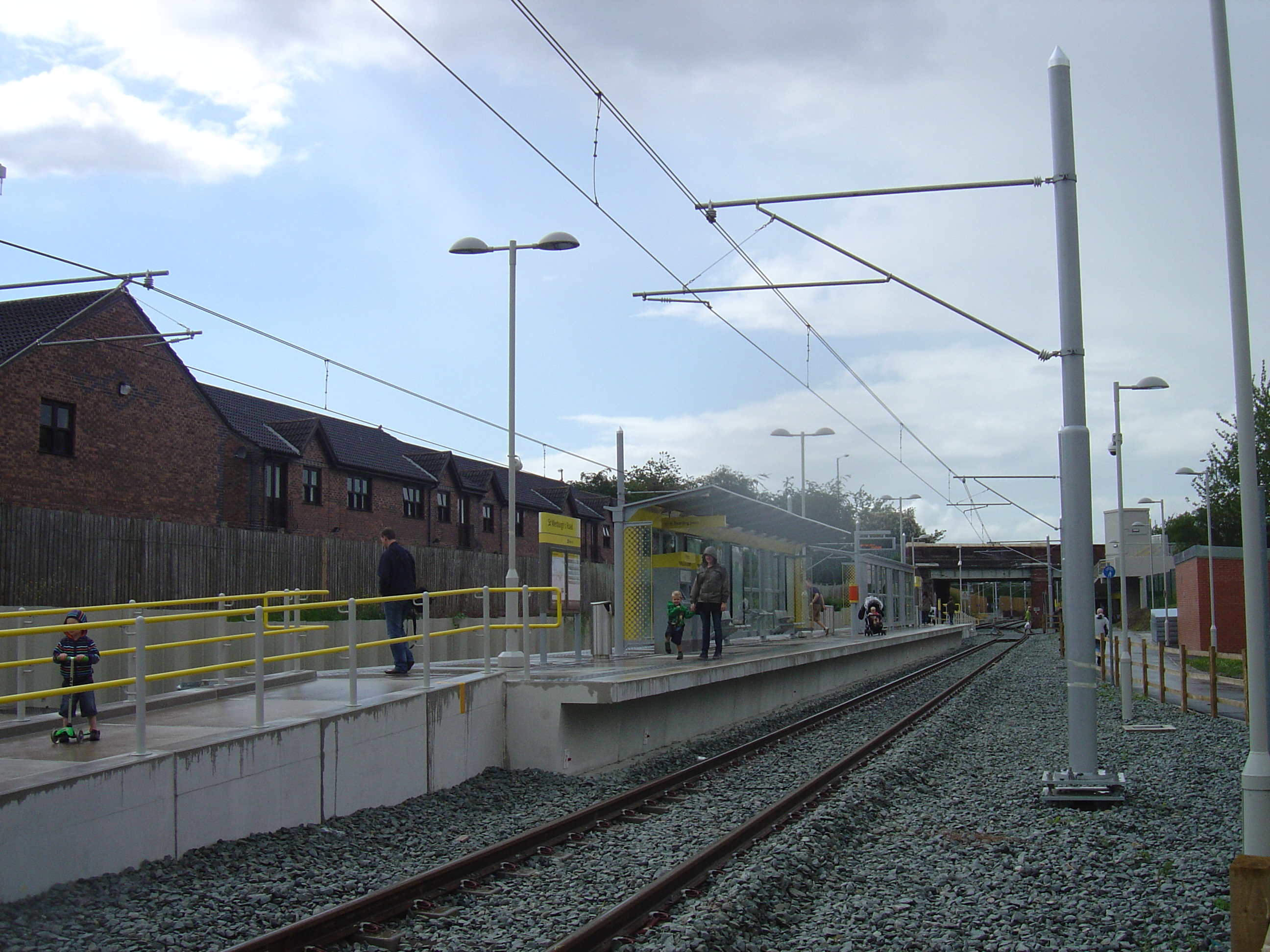
- St Werburgh's Road stop, facing west about a week after opening in 2011.

General information
- Location: Chorlton-cum-Hardy, Manchester, England
- Coordinates: 53.43884°N 2.26570°W
- Grid reference: SJ824936
- System: Manchester Metrolink tram stop
- Line: South Manchester Line
- Platforms: 2 (island)
- Tram routes

Construction
- Structure type: Below-grade
- Accessible: Yes

Other information
- Status: In operation
- Station code: -
- Fare zone: 2/3
- Website: St Werburgh's Road tram stop

History
- Opened: 7 July 2011; 15 years ago
Route map
Location

St Werburgh's Road is a Manchester Metrolink tram stop in south Manchester, England. It is historically located in the Hough End area, though it is now commonly regarded as being part of Chorlton-cum-Hardy. It is on the South Manchester Line, in fare zones 2 and 3. This stop was constructed and opened as part of Phase 3a of the network's expansion on 7 July 2011; it has step-free access.

This stop is located on a former railway trackbed, at the former Chorlton Junction where the Manchester South District Line and Fallowfield Loop Line converged. The railway lines were left derelict when they closed; however, the Fallowfield Loop was converted to a shared-use path in the early 2000s. Part of the Manchester South District Line's trackbed was restored and converted to Metrolink; however, this tram stop itself is not a converted railway station.

== History ==
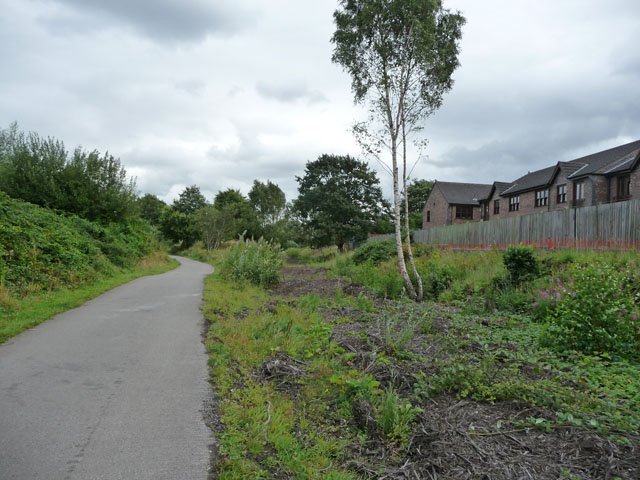
Fallowfield Loop path along the disused railway which is seen on the right, August 2009

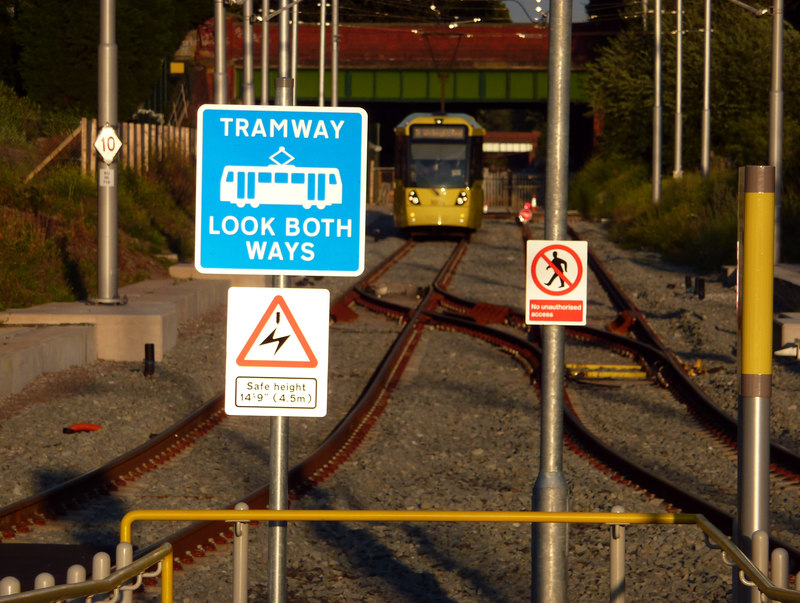
Whilst the extension to East Didsbury was under construction, trams turned around at St Werburgh's Road. A tram is seen stabled here, July 2011

The Manchester South District Railway began passenger service on 1 January 1880 and passenger services ceased after 1 January 1967. The line remained in use for freight and other uses until all of the MSDR's track east of Chorlton Junction was closed to all traffic after 17 August 1969 and lifted in 1970. The Fallowfield Loop continued to operate as a freight line until 1988.

Proposals to reopen the line were put forward as early as the 1980s, but remained unfunded until the 2000s. In 2006, it was announced that Phase 3a for Metrolink would go ahead, including extending the network as far as St Werburgh's Road. Following the rejection of the Greater Manchester Transport Innovation Fund in a public referendum in 2008, extension of this line further to East Didsbury (part of Phase 3b) went ahead with funding from national and local government.

Construction of the line began in April 2009 and the line became operational as far as St Werburgh's Road on 7 July 2011. Whilst the line to East Didsbury was being finished, trams continued for about 100 metres after the stop and reversed to return on the opposite platform via a track crossover. Services through to East Didsbury began on 23 May 2013.

== Layout ==
St Werburgh's Road has one island platform serving two tracks and was constructed with accessibility in mind. There are two entrances to the station via pedestrian track crossings and ramps, both from the Fallowfield Loop path at either ends of the island platform.

Two dot matrix passenger information displays stand at the centre of the platforms serving one side each, showing estimated arrival times for trams in minutes up to 30 minutes prior (up to three at a time) and number of carriages.

There is a crossover track east of the stop which enabled trams to turn around when East Didsbury and Manchester Airport extensions were under construction. Today, it enables trams to turn around at St Werburgh's Road in case there is a disruption to normal service.

== Services ==
Every route across the Manchester Metrolink network operates to a 12-minute headway (five tph) Monday–Saturday and to a 15-minute headway (four tph) on Sundays and bank holidays. Sections served by a second peak-only route (like this stop) will have a combined headway of six minutes during peak times.

St Werburgh's Road is located on the border of Zones 2 and 3, and the stop itself has two platforms in an island layout which aren't named. Trams towards Victoria and Rochdale Town Centre depart from the inbound platform (northernmost) and an extra service runs direct to Shaw and Crompton during peak times. Trams to East Didsbury and Manchester Airport depart from the outbound platform (southernmost).

Preceding station	Manchester Metrolink	Following station
Withington towards East Didsbury	East Didsbury–Rochdale	Chorlton towards Rochdale Town Centre
Withington towards East Didsbury	East Didsbury–Shaw (peak only)	Chorlton towards Shaw and Crompton
Barlow Moor Road towards Manchester Airport	Manchester Airport–Victoria	Chorlton towards Victoria

== Connections ==
Stagecoach Manchester operates the 85 and 85A routes along the nearby A6019 Wilbraham Road; this connects the area with Chorlton and Manchester Piccadilly Gardens.

== Fallowfield Loop path ==
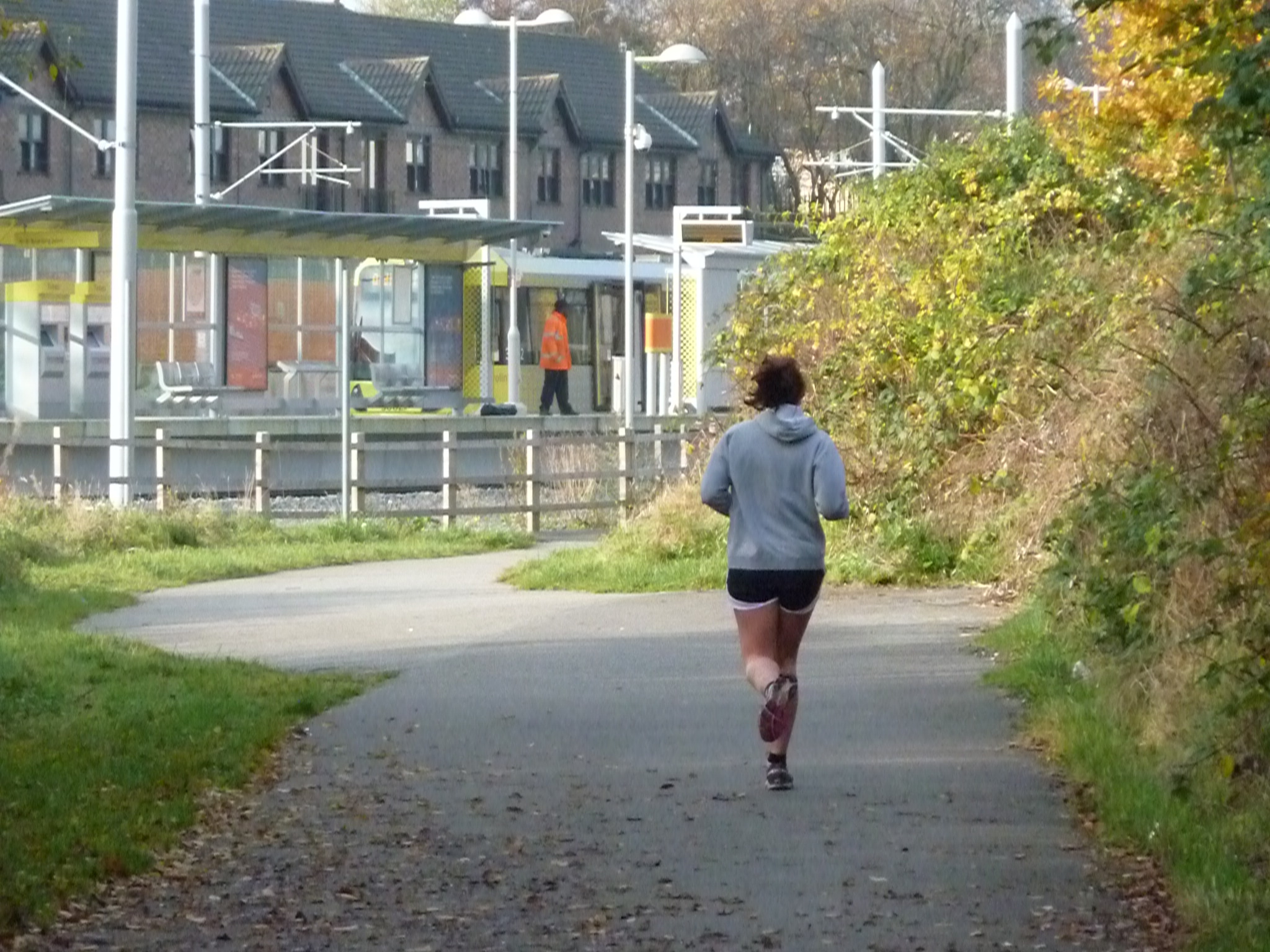
The Fallowfield Loop shared-use path facing the tram stop, November 2012

The Fallowfield Loop shared-use path begins just east of St Werburgh's Road station at a step-free access ramp from the road bridge. It cuts away from the tram line in an easterly direction and follows the trackbed of the former Fallowfield Loop railway line through Fallowfield and Levenshulme to Fairfield and Gorton. The tram stop can be accessed from this path.

== Accidents and incidents ==
- 4 July 2015: A tram derailed at the stop after vandals attacked the tram and the tracks.
- 21 July 2016: A man was badly injured at the stop when his leg became trapped between a tram and the platform.
- 6 October 2022: A woman was struck by an approaching tram heading to East Didsbury, at the pedestrian track crossing at the west side of the stop.

== See also ==
- Fallowfield Loop railway line
- Manchester South District Railway
