= Fallowfield Loop =

Shared-use path around the south of Manchester, England

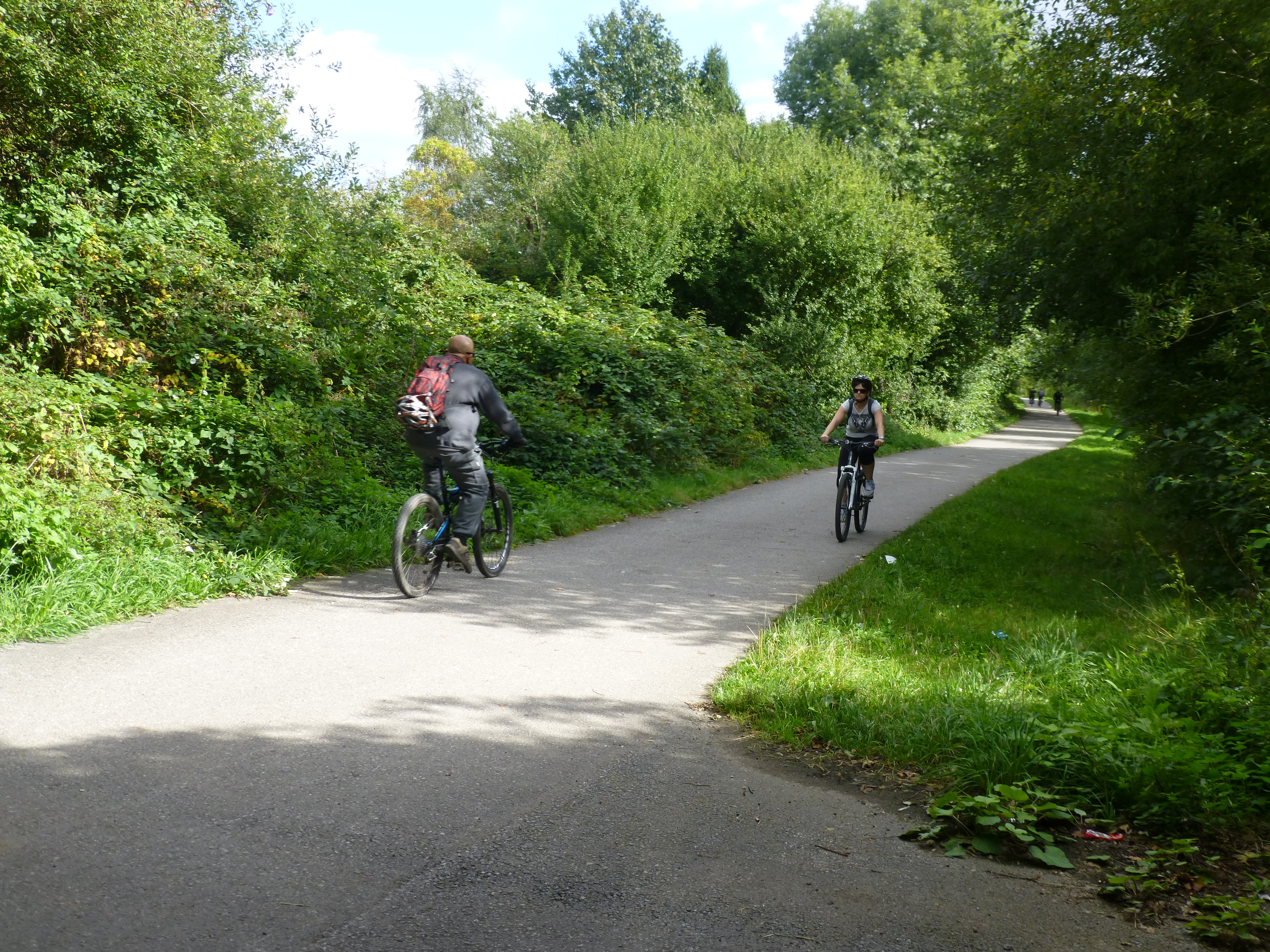
Cyclists on the Fallowfield Loop in September 2013

The Fallowfield Loop is an off-road cycle path, pedestrian and horse riding route in the south of Manchester, England, which is one of the National Cycle Network routes and paths; it was developed and built by Sustrans, forming part of routes 6 and 60.

The Loop follows the route of the former Fallowfield Loop railway line, which closed in 1988. It is 8 miles (13 km) long and connects Chorlton-cum-Hardy in the west with Fairfield in the east, passing through Whalley Range, Fallowfield, Levenshulme and Gorton.

== History ==
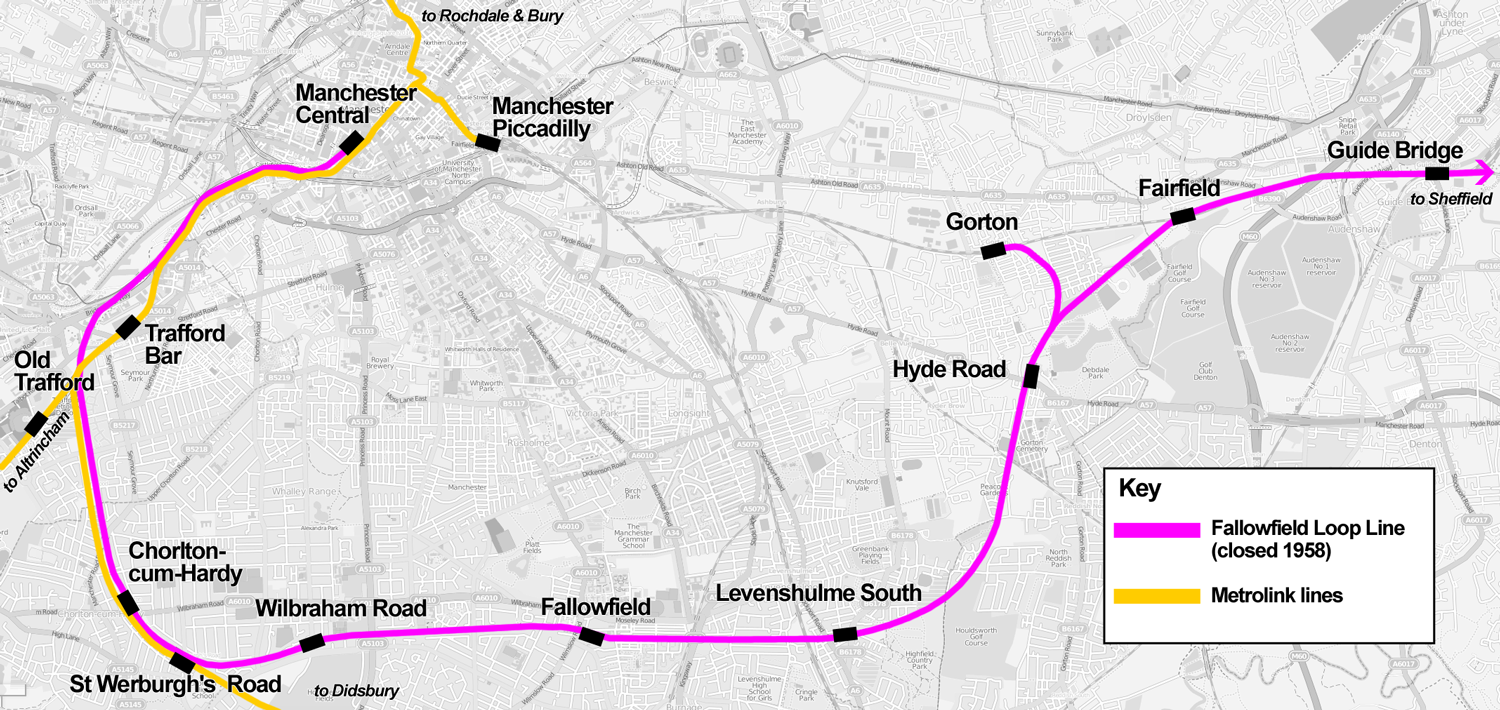
The historical route of the Fallowfield Loop railway line (1892–1969, freight only until 1988), with the modern Metrolink route.

The Fallowfield Loop railway line was a local railway route in Greater Manchester. Trains on the Manchester, Sheffield and Lincolnshire Railway line (later, the Great Central Railway line) from Sheffield Victoria and Guide Bridge used the "Loop" to access Manchester Central railway station. At Chorlton-cum-Hardy the line joined with the Manchester South District Line on the route into Manchester Central.

The Fallowfield Loop Line was fully opened to passengers in 1892. On 7 July 1958, the stations at Hyde Road, Levenshulme South, Fallowfield and Wilbraham Road were closed, although the line itself remained open to passenger services until 5 May 1969, after which it was operated as a freight-only route. The loop line also provided access to Reddish Electric Depot, which was built adjacent to the line in 1954 to maintain the new fleet of electric trains for the Woodhead Line; the depot closed in 1983. In March 1987, a short section of track at the former site of Hyde Road station was briefly used to give a public demonstration of the proposed Manchester Metrolink tram system, with a temporary station named Debdale Park constructed beside the line. Soon after this, the line was finally closed and the railway tracks were lifted in October 1988.

== Conversion to a shared-use path ==
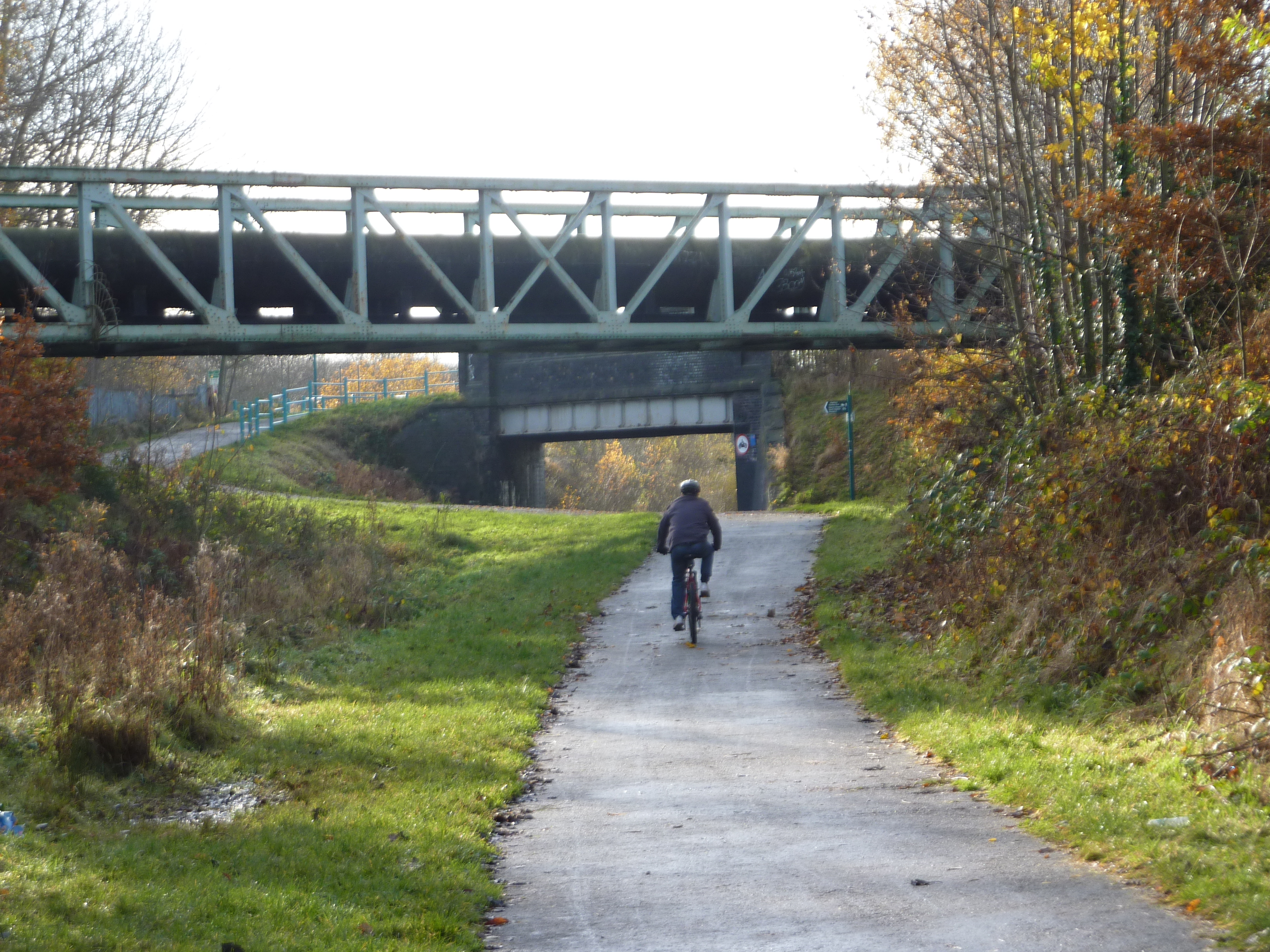
The Fallowfield Loop path near Nelstrop Road, Reddish.

The old railway route had lain derelict for many years until the late 1990s, when a group of cyclists started campaigning for its conversion to a traffic-free greenway across south Manchester. That group, together with supporters from local civic societies and other community groups, formally became the Friends of the Fallowfield Loop in June 2001. The route is now owned mostly by Sustrans, a charity which specialises in building and maintaining off-road shared-use paths.

There are many access points onto the Loop along its length from Wilbraham Road in Chorlton-cum-Hardy, at its western end, to Fairfield station in the east. There are also several metal barriers along the route which, until late 2016, would disrupt the ride for cyclists on normal-size bikes; larger cycles, like tandems and trikes, had to be lifted over them. However, after a successful trial period in 2016, the barriers along the route itself are now open permanently. The barriers at the different entrance points to the Loop are a variety of designs; some of these are still very difficult to access using a normal bicycle, whilst others have been modified to be fully accessible even for tandems.

== Along the route ==
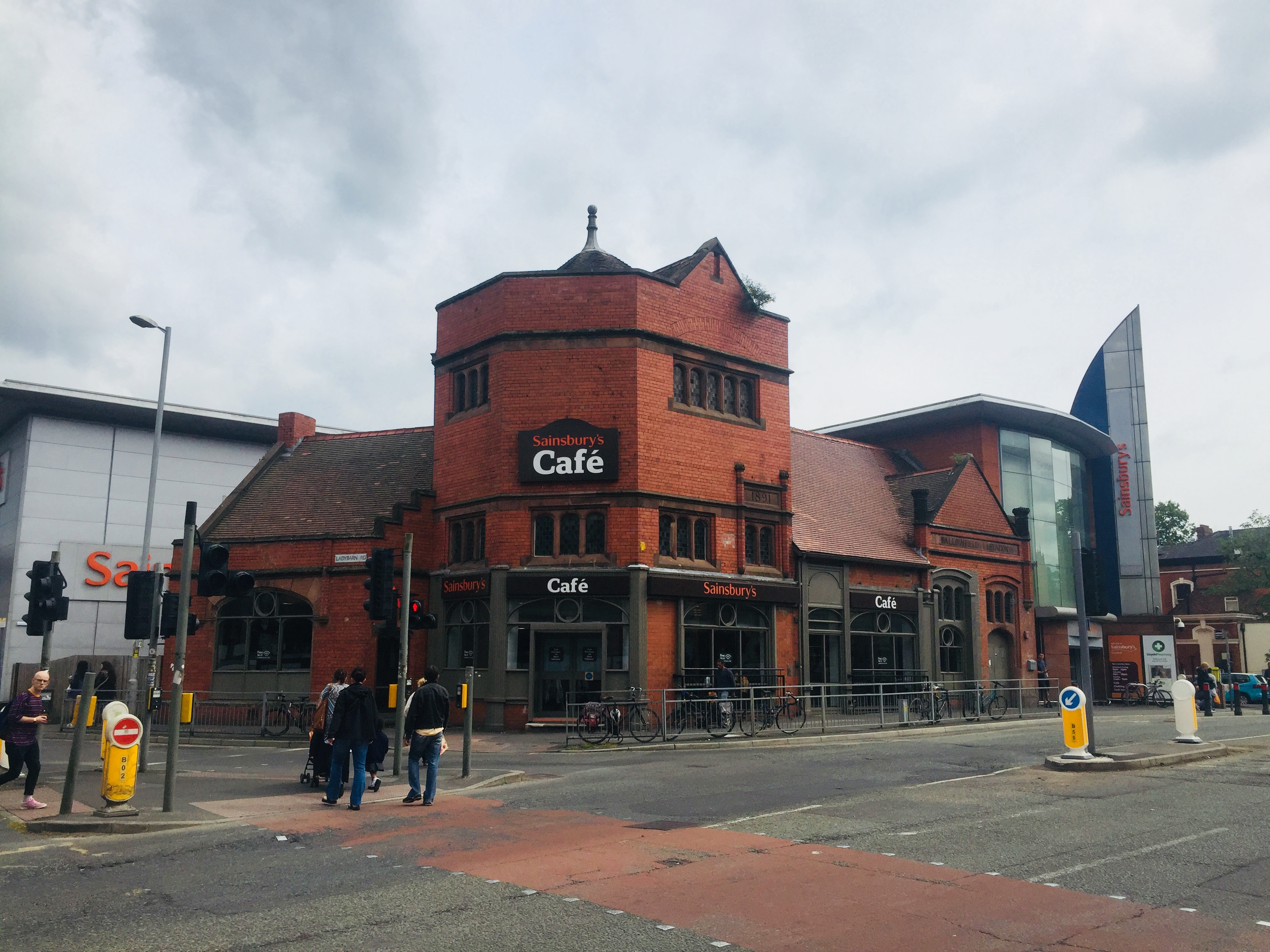
Remnants of the former railway are still in evidence along the route, such as the former Fallowfield railway station buildings next to the cycle path at the Wilmslow Road access point.

The Fallowfield Loop forms a green structure in an arc around Manchester city centre, linking parks and open spaces. Near its western end, the Loop crosses the South Manchester Line of Greater Manchester's light-rail Metrolink system at St Werburgh's Road Metrolink station. There is a National Cycle Network fossil tree milepost, designed by John Mills, in the section of the Loop between Broom Lane and Stockport Road; there are Sustrans murals underneath the former railway bridges at Stockport Road and Wellington Road. Towards the east of the route, the Loop passes Highfield Country Park, Debdale Park and Gorton Reservoirs, and intersects Gorton Heritage Trail. Travelling up Route 60 from the Debdale Park access point leads to Ashton Canal, the Manchester Velodrome and the City of Manchester Stadium. The Thirlmere Aqueduct passes over the Loop near the Nelstrop Road access point and the Elisabeth Svendsen Trust Donkey Sanctuary is also located along the route, at Abbey Hey. The Friends of the Fallowfield Loop have produced a map showing points of interest on the Loop.

There are some stone sculptures on the Loop in Whalley Range and Levenshulme, with three wooden sculptures called Man, Woman and Child by local artist Rachel Ramchurn, near Highfield Country Park.

In 2019, Manchester City Council announced plans to widen Hyde Road, the A57, by removing the former railway bridge by which the path crosses it and replacing it with a new bridge. This was planned to take about a year, during which the cycle path could be disrupted. It proposed to include a new connection to the path using a stairway. The new bridge was opened in July 2020, but no stairway was built. The council then announced plans to spend £4.9 million on improvements to the path, including improved entry and exit points, transformed open spaces, children's play areas and seating.

The former Levenshulme South railway station was transformed in 2022 into a cycle café, bar, urban garden, restaurant and bike workshop as a social enterprise called Station South.

== Crime and antisocial behaviour on the Loop ==
Despite an announcement by the Mayor of Greater Manchester Andy Burnham of plans to invest £160 million on the 'Bee Safe Network' of cycleways and walking routes, fears that antisocial behaviour and crime along the route that had already existed including 21 cyclists attacked in autumn 2018, increased. In light of this, there were calls for Greater Manchester Police to take cycle crime in Manchester more seriously - as the incidents put people off using the Loop as a commuter and leisure route. The route should benefit from a share of the Greater Manchester 'Safer Streets Fund'.

== See also ==
- Cycling in Manchester
