= UPCS =

UPCS may refer to:

- Unlicensed Personal Communications Services
- University Park Campus School
- University Counseling and Psychological Services, see University Counseling Centers
- University of the Philippines Cherubim and Seraphim

== See also ==
- UCP (disambiguation)
