= Levenshulme =

Suburb of Manchester, England

Coordinates: 53.447°N 2.187°W

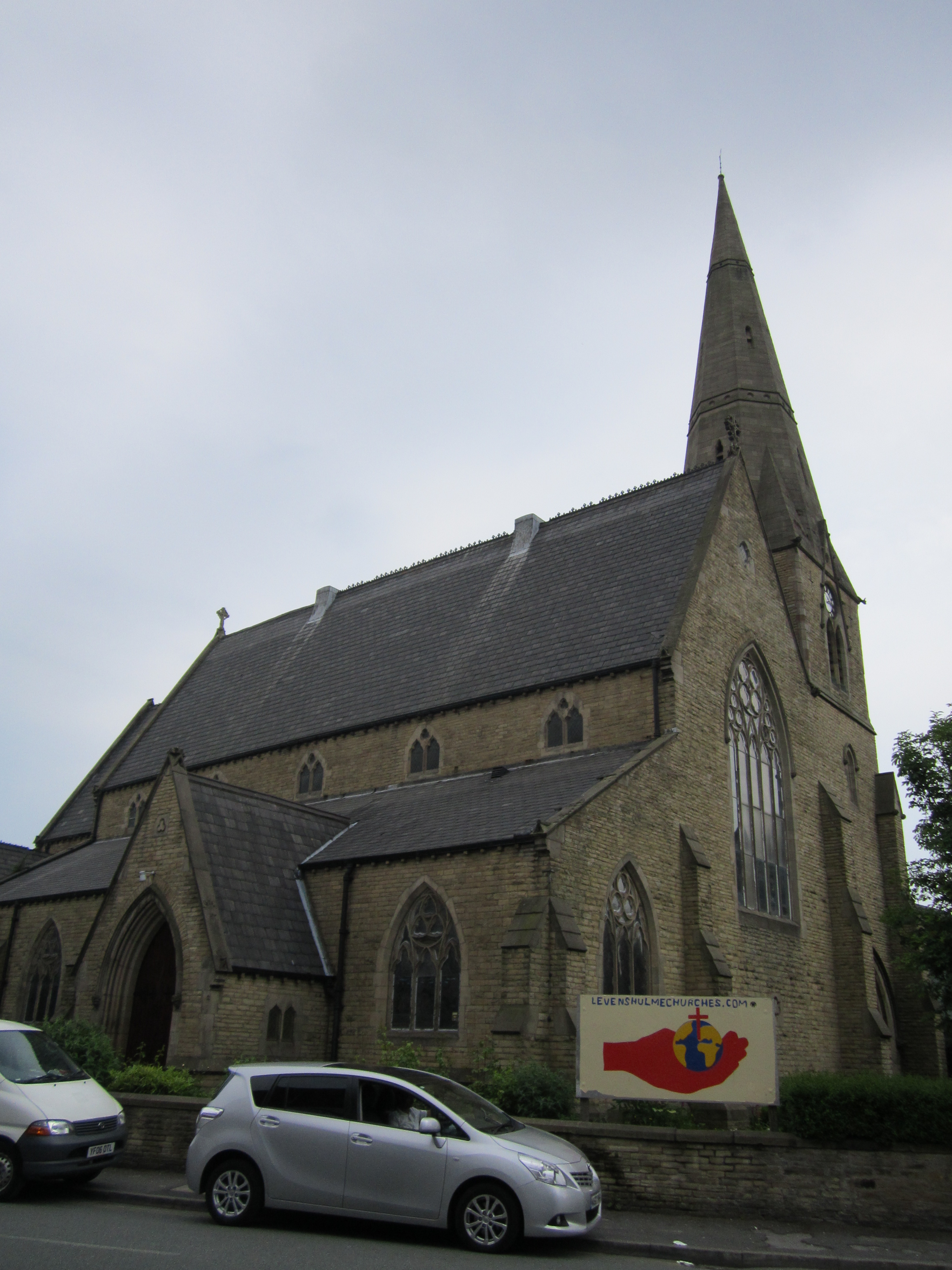
- St Peter's Church, Levenshulme

- Location within Greater Manchester
- Population: 19,647 (2021 census)
- OS grid reference: SJ875945
- Metropolitan borough: City of Manchester
- Metropolitan county: Greater Manchester
- Region: North West
- Country: England
- Sovereign state: United Kingdom
- Post town: Manchester
- Postcode district: M19
- Dialling code: 0161
- Police: Greater Manchester
- Fire: Greater Manchester
- Ambulance: North West
- UK Parliament: Gorton and Denton
- Councillors: Fesl Reza-Khan (Green); Basat Sheikh (Labour); Zahid Hussain (Labour)

Levenshulme (/ˈlɛvənʃuːm/) is an area of Manchester, England, bordering Fallowfield, Longsight, Gorton, Burnage, Heaton Chapel and Reddish, halfway between Stockport and Manchester city centre on the A6. Levenshulme is predominantly residential with numerous fast food shops, public houses and antique stores. It has a multi-cultural and multi-ethnic population of 19,647 at the 2021 census. The Manchester to London railway line passes through Levenshulme railway station.

Historically in Lancashire, Levenshulme is a former township and became a part of Manchester in 1909. Levenshulme, like its neighbour Longsight, was historically a wealthy and middle class district of Manchester, though in the 20th century Levenshulme and many surrounding areas suffered from inner city decline. However, the area is now displaying signs of gentrification and has been described as one of Manchester's most "up and coming" neighbourhoods.

== History ==
The very early history is obscure. Many of the nearby suburbs, such as Withington, Didsbury, Gorton etc., had a history of developing as villages, but Levenshulme was a manor of Withington, with a feudal lord of the manor. In 1319, possession was given to William Legh of Baguley by his grandfather Sir William of Baguley in Cheshire. William Legh's descendants continued to hold the manor until the 17th century.

The name is believed to be a possessive version of a man's name, perhaps "Leofwine's", and "holm", a Viking term meaning island (usually in a lake or river). According to East Lancashire expert Eilert Ekwall, it has been spelt in many ways since the Middle Ages. In 1246 it was called "Lewyneshulm", in 1322 "Levensholme", and in 1587 "Lensom". In the 1322 survey of Manchester it appears as "Lywenshulme", and Collegiate Church charters refer to it as "Leysholme" (1556), "Lensholme" (1578) and "Lentsholme" (1635). The "hulme" element is common in Manchester, and was pronounced "Oom", hence Levenshulme was traditionally "Levenzoom" to the residents and nicknamed as Levy, recently sometimes spelt as Leve.

The main Stockport Road, now part of the A6, dates from 1724, when a turnpike road was built between Manchester and Stockport.

Sorting label for Tally Rand [sic] in old Post Office

An area of East Levenshulme was known during the 19th century as Talleyrand. It included Talleyrand House (later renamed as Barlow House) and a street, Talleyrand Row. It was said the French statesman Talleyrand had once stayed there during his exile from France during the French Revolution, presumably at some point between 1792 and 1794. The place name "Talley Rand" is also found on the old post office sorting labels displayed in the POD café based in the former main post office. There is now a pub called "Talleyrand", on the A6.

Legend has it that the famous highwayman Dick Turpin often visited the Blue Bell Inn on Barlow Road which shares the name of his birthplace. There has been an inn on this site for 700 years. The current pub was built after the previous Blue Bell Inn was destroyed during a German bombing raid in the Second World War.

In 1917, the McVitie & Price biscuit factory was opened.

=== Housing ===
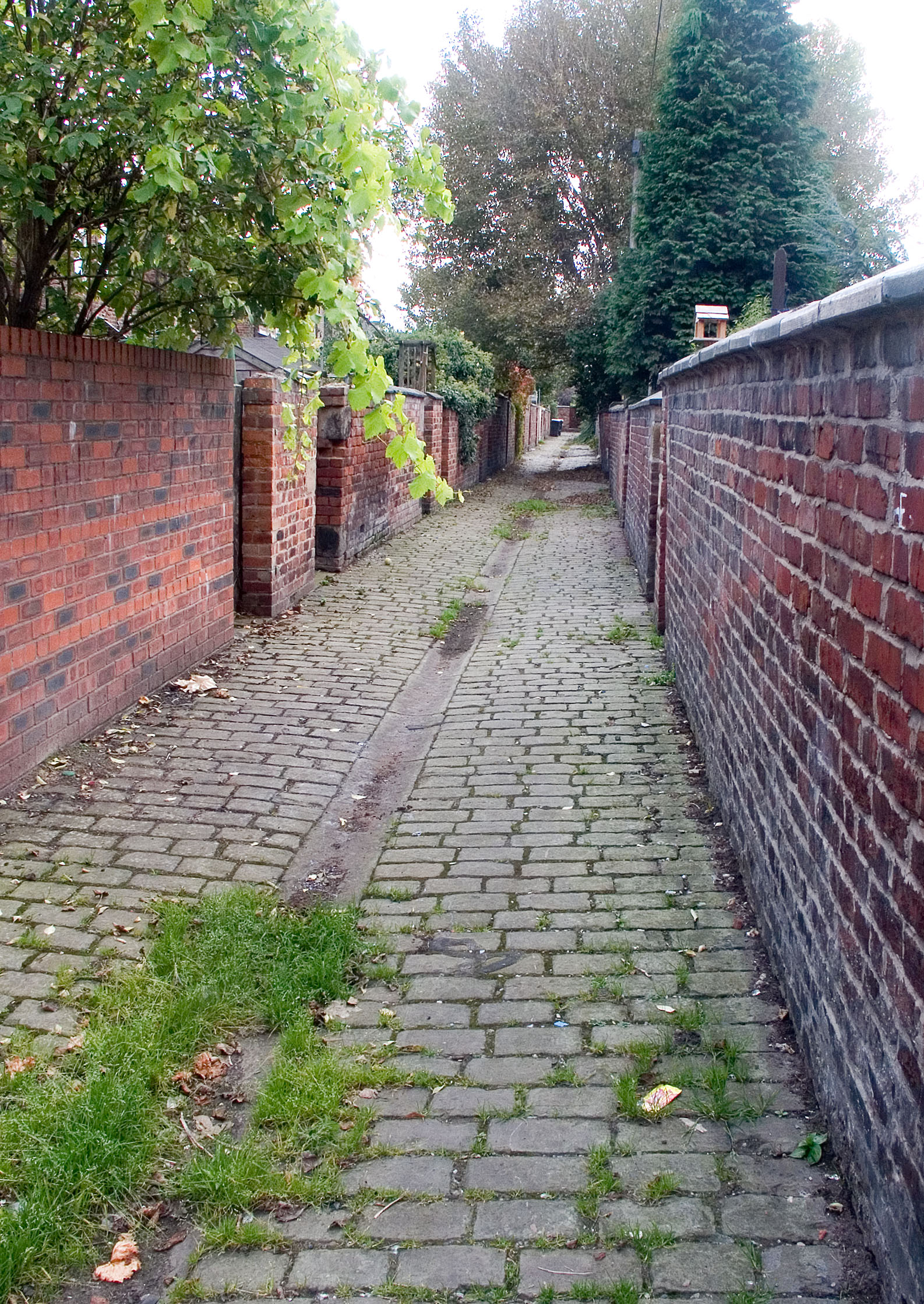
A typical back entry

The typical housing of Levenshulme consists of terraced houses, the majority of which were built circa 1880–1890. The style of houses are what are known colloquially as "two up-two downs". With a bedroom above each lower room, the house is bisected by a steep, narrow staircase. A kitchen was to the rear. Right up to the 1980s it was not uncommon for the original outside toilet (to the rear of the kitchen) to still be present, and some houses still had no bathroom or central heating.

The layout of the streets which contain these terraces are typical of the area and consist of grid layouts intersected with wide back entries which run the length of the terrace blocks at the rear and at each end of the block. This alley/back-entry layout is supposed to be because of an old by-law of the Levenshulme local authority that every terraced house had to have a front garden and allow access to the back door by a horse and cart to enable rubbish to be removed without the need to enter the house.

These back entries are now generally considered to be a threat to home security. Accordingly Manchester City Council has, over recent years, helped residents by funding a "gated alley" response to the threat. When the majority of affected residents of a particular entry are in agreement the entries have iron gates set up at all ingress and egress points with all affected residents being issued a key.

== Governance ==
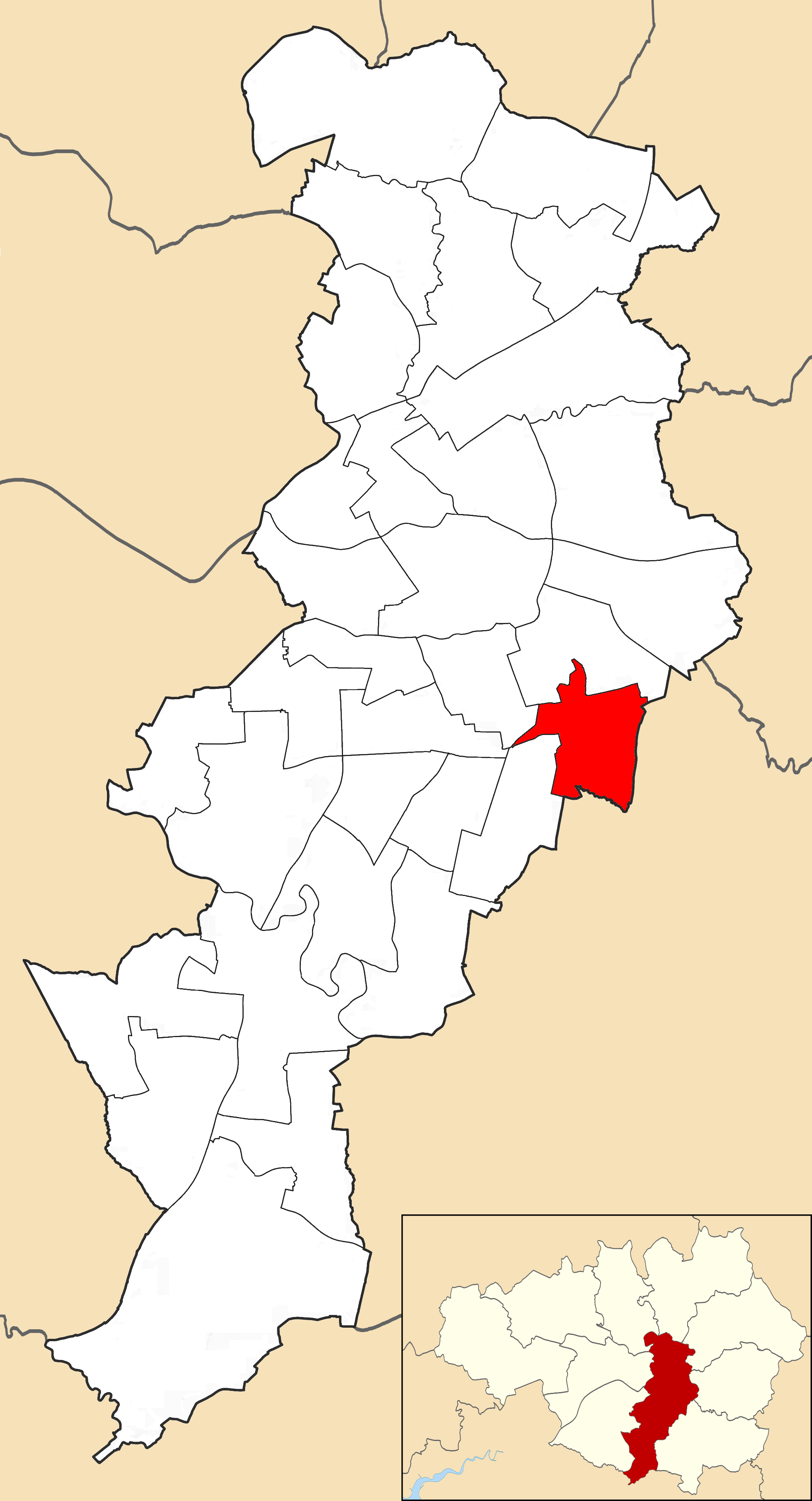
Levenshulme electoral ward within Manchester borough

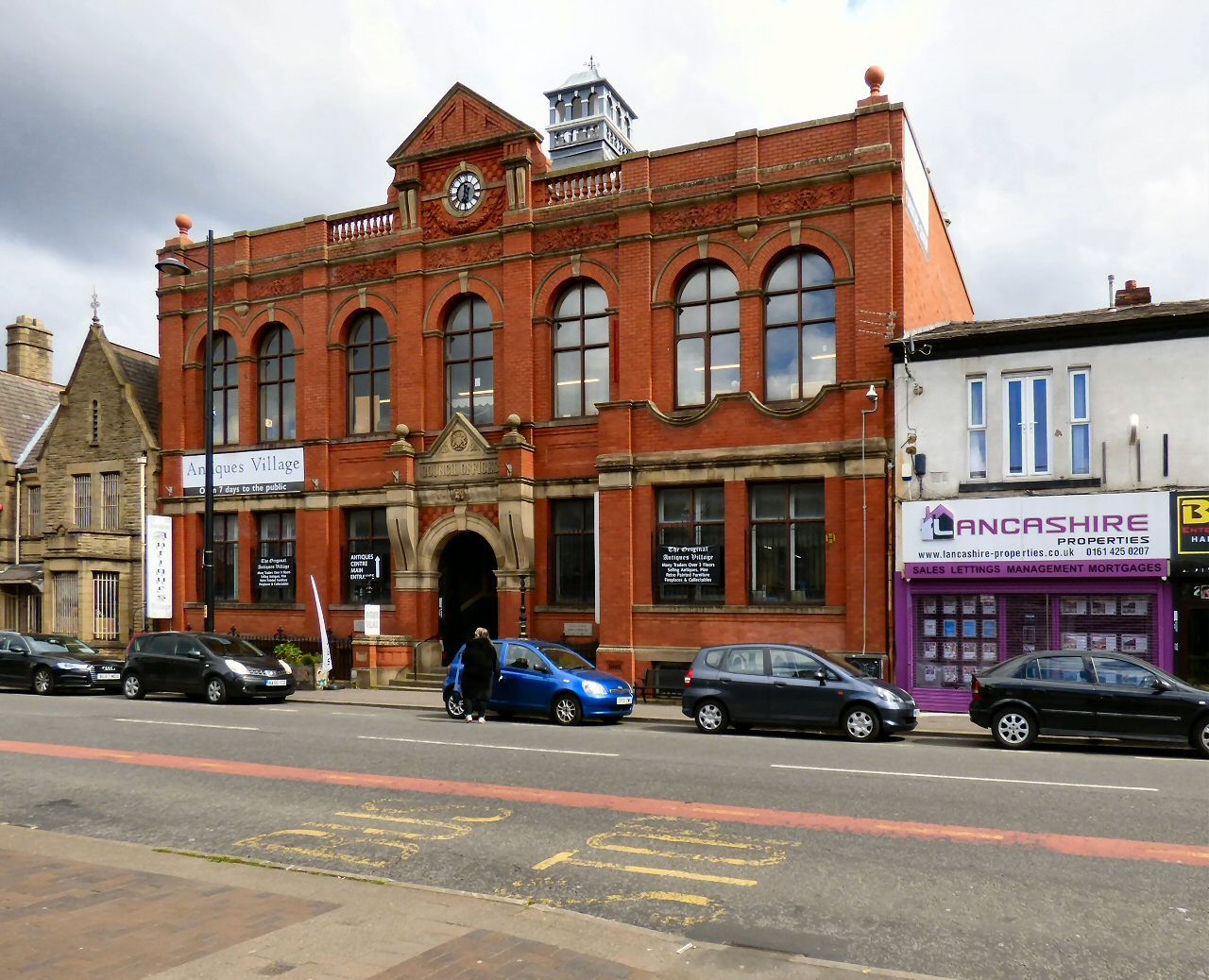
Levenshulme Town Hall

Levenshulme was formerly a township and chapelry in the parish of Manchester, in 1866 Levenshulme became a separate civil parish. Manchester and its districts had developed into what were referred to as the "Thirty Townships". Levenshulme was one of them and in 1865 got its own 'board' and from 1894 to 1909 was an urban district council, based at Levenshulme Town Hall. On 1 October 1910 the parish was abolished and merged with South Manchester. In 1901 the parish had a population of 11,485. Prior to the turn of the 20th century West Levenshulme was considered to be a "dormitory" for Manchester. This description eventually changed to one of "residential suburb" a decade or so later, but East Levenshulme was still primarily industrial in nature consisting mostly of print works, bleach works, dye works and mattress works. In spite of the preponderance of industrial works there were also several farms, and the area around what is now Levenshulme High School was considered to be semi-rural until the 1920s.

Until the late 19th century, Manchester's outlying townships had to supply their own amenities. This was becoming increasingly difficult for the urban councils to do and as a result there was a considerable difference in prices charged to the residents compared to the prices charged by Manchester itself. Manchester refused to alleviate these difficulties unless townships agreed to come under its control. As a result the townships slowly began to amalgamate into Manchester's rule. Along with Withington, Levenshulme protested at the discrepancy of prices for gas in the city and for the outlying townships that were already supplied by Manchester. Nevertheless many of those townships arranged to get their electricity from Manchester, possibly in the hope that they would benefit from the city's plans to electrify the tram system when the existing lease with the Manchester Carriage and Tramways Company was due to end in 1901. Along with Gorton, Levenshulme joined Manchester in 1909. The tramways were extended to serve Levenshulme before the start of the First World War in 1914.

The ward boundaries of Levenshulme have been moved in recent ward reorganisations, and as a result large areas in the north and east of Levenshulme are now officially in the ward of Gorton South. To the west areas historically regarded as Fallowfield are now officially part of Levenshulme and Rusholme.

Levenshulme forms part of the wider Gorton and Denton Parliamentary constituency and has been represented in Westminster by Hannah Spencer since February 2026.

=== Councillors ===
The Levenshulme ward is represented in Manchester City Council by two Labour councillors: Basat Sheikh and Zahid Hussain and Green councillor Fesl Reza-Khan.

Dzidra Noor.

Election	Councillor	Councillor	Councillor
2004	Alexander Cowan (Lib Dem)	John Commons (Lib Dem)	Keith Whitmore (Lib Dem)
2006	Alexander Cowan (Lib Dem)	John Commons (Lib Dem)	Keith Whitmore (Lib Dem)
2007	Alexander Cowan (Lib Dem)	John Commons (Lib Dem)	Keith Whitmore (Lib Dem)
2008	Alexander Cowan (Lib Dem)	John Commons (Lib Dem)	Keith Whitmore (Lib Dem)
2010	James Hennigan (Lib Dem)	John Commons (Lib Dem)	Keith Whitmore (Lib Dem)
2011	James Hennigan (Lib Dem)	Aftab Ahmed (Lab)	Keith Whitmore (Lib Dem)
2012	James Hennigan (Lib Dem)	Aftab Ahmed (Lab)	Nasrin Ali (Lab)
2014	Dzidra Noor (Lab)	Aftab Ahmed (Lab)	Nasrin Ali (Lab)
2015	Dzidra Noor (Lab)	Basat Sheikh (Lab)	Nasrin Ali (Lab)
2016	Dzidra Noor (Lab)	Basat Sheikh (Lab)	Nasrin Ali (Lab)
2018	Dzidra Noor (Lab)	Basat Sheikh (Lab)	Bernard Stone (Lab)
2019	Dzidra Noor (Lab)	Basat Sheikh (Lab)	Bernard Stone (Lab)
2021	Dzidra Noor (Lab)	Basat Sheikh (Lab)	Zahid Hussain (Lab)
2022	Dzidra Noor (Lab)	Basat Sheikh (Lab)	Zahid Hussain (Lab)
2023	Dzidra Noor (Lab)	Basat Sheikh (Lab)	Zahid Hussain (Lab)
2024	Dzidra Noor (Lab)	Basat Sheikh (Lab)	Zahid Hussain (Lab)
2026	Fesl Reza-Khan (Grn)	Basat Sheikh (Lab)	Zahid Hussain (Lab)

indicates seat up for re-election.

== Demography ==
In 1830, Levenshulme had a population of 768.

In 2001, Levenshulme had an Irish population of approximately 7.0% which was twice the Manchester average, and, as a consequence, it was sometimes called County Levenshulme in reference to the county structure in Ireland, though the 2011 census figures show the Irish population has shrunk to 4.1%. Increasing numbers of Irish have moved to inner Stockport or back to develop their homeland. The demographics within the district have changed, with increasing numbers of (mostly Muslim) people of South Asian origin and an ever-increasing number of Africans have settled in Levenshulme. Over a third of the population belong to an ethnic minority. In recent times, Levenshulme has also seen an influx of Eastern Europeans moving into the area, bringing about Polish confectionery shops. Many students also rent accommodation in the area.

Ethnic make up of Levenshulme was at the 2011 census
Ethnic group	Person count	Percentage
White: British	7,806	50.59
Asian/Asian-British: Pakistani	3,157	20.46
White: Irish	638	4.13
White: Other	621	4.02
Other Ethnic Groups	516	3.34
Black/Black-British: African	393	2.55
Asian/Asian-British: Other Asian	326	2.11
Asian/Asian-British: Bangladeshi	323	2.09
Asian/Asian-British: Indian	303	1.96
Mixed: White & Asian	246	1.59
Black/Black-British: Caribbean	242	1.57
Mixed: Other	196	1.27
Mixed: White & Black Caribbean	193	1.25
Chinese	188	1.22
Black/Black-British: Other Black	147	0.95
Mixed: White & Black African	115	0.75

== Culture ==
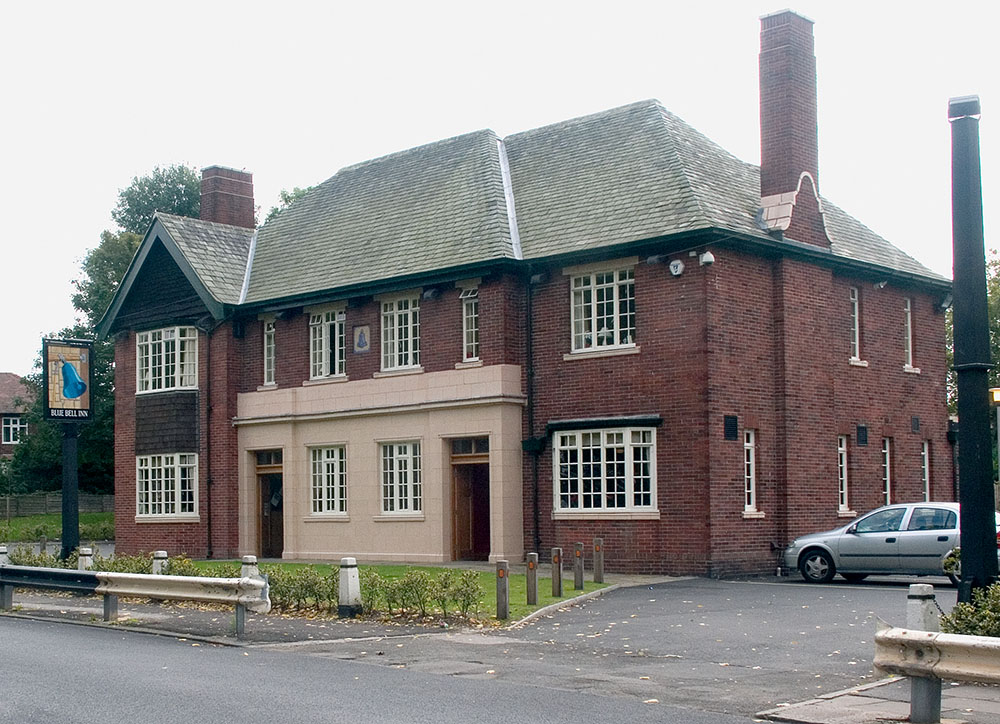
Blue Bell Inn

Levenshulme is evolving into an area typical of south Manchester: a mix of pubs, bars, restaurants, takeaways, solicitors, pound shops and booking agents, along with terraced housing. The area is in south-east Manchester and neighbours Heaton Chapel to the south, which is one of the most affluent parts of Greater Manchester.

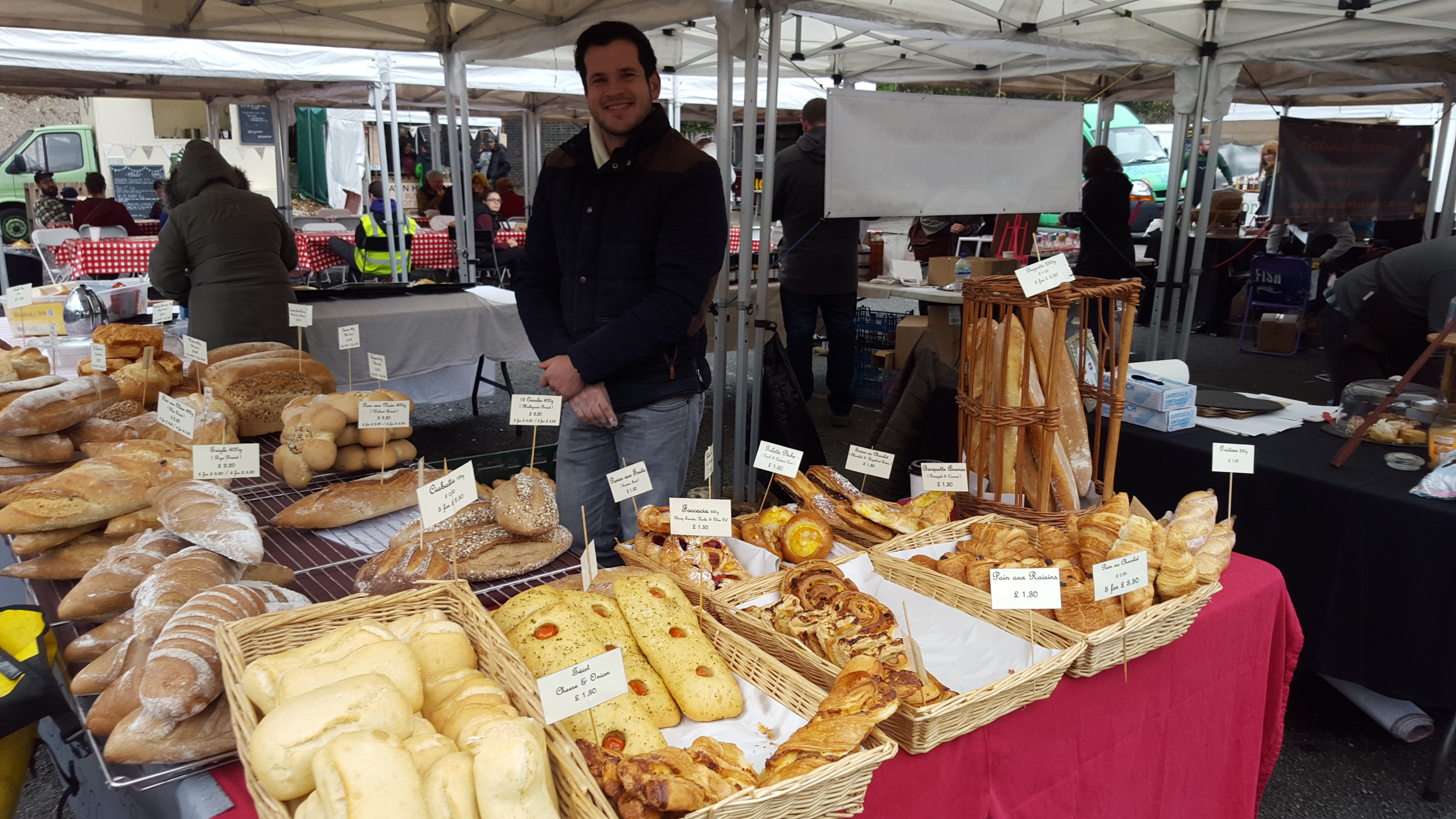
Levenshulme market

Levenshulme Market was launched in March 2013 and operates every Saturday, between March and December, from 10 a.m. to 4 p.m. It is a social enterprise-run market which prides itself on its diverse range of high quality traders. It has a changing roster of 50 artisan traders selling produce, street food, plants, gifts, vintage clothing and homeware.

Since 1998, the annual Levenshulme Festival usually features 120+ multi-cultural events from firework displays to music concerts.

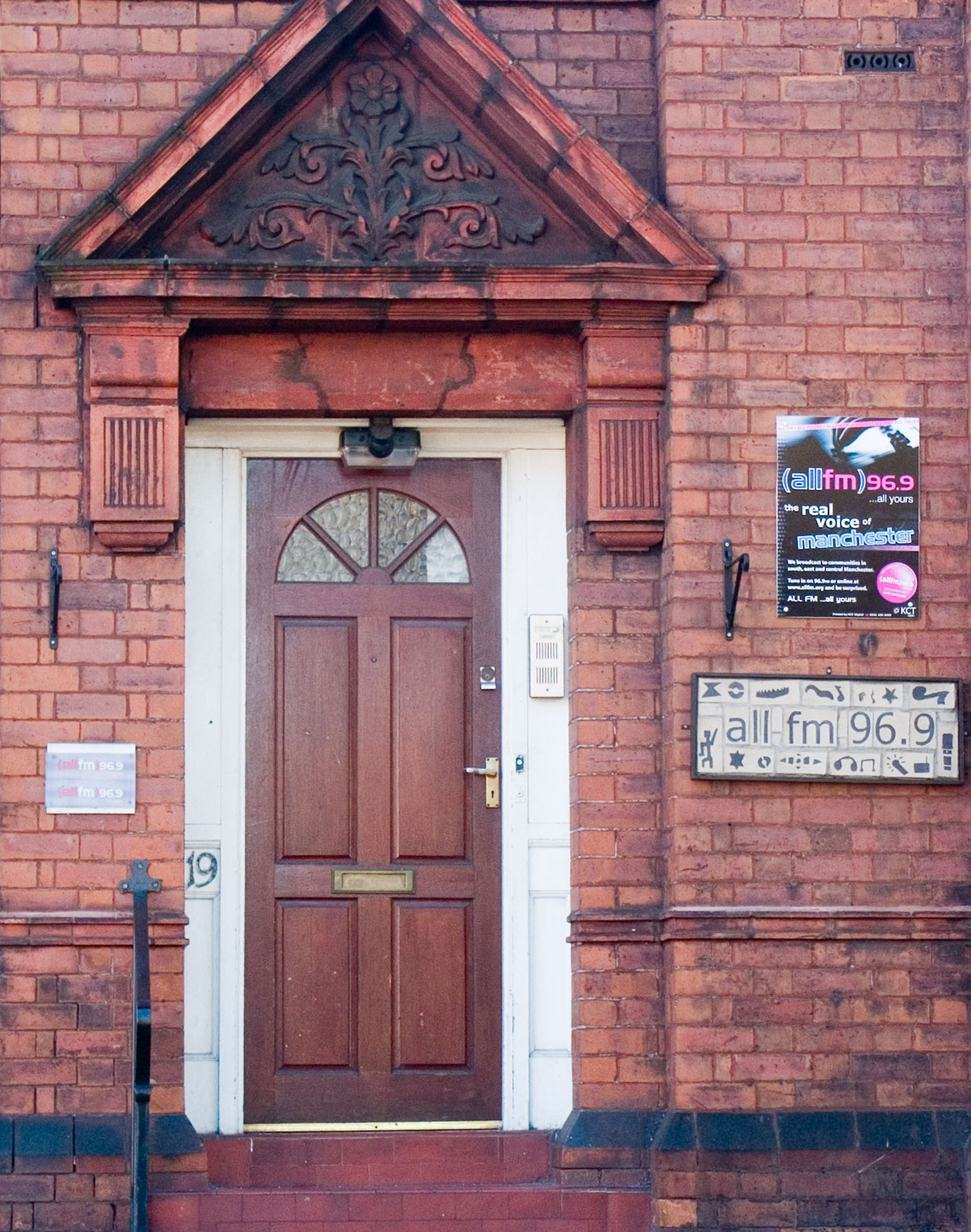
Home of ALL FM radio station

The community radio station ALL FM is based in Levenshulme.

There is a local amateur dramatic society, Levenshulme Players, who have produced stage plays, comedy reviews, Murder Mystery Evenings and radio plays for ALL FM. They write much of their own material.

== Religion ==
Places of worship in Levenshulme
Name	Address	Religion	Notes
St Aidan's Orthodox Church	Clare Road	English Language Orthodox	Consecrated 7 September 1997
Levenshulme Baptist Church	Elmsworth Avenue	Baptist	
Levenshulme Methodist Church	Stockport Road	Methodist	Consecrated 13 May 1865. Methodism in Levenshulme has a history dating back to 1766 (based on financial records of the Methodist Society). In that time there have been five Methodist churches. Levenshulme Methodist Church (formerly Levenshulme New Wesleyan Chapel) is the only one to survive.
Levenshulme Inspire / Levenshulme United Reformed Church	Stockport Road	URC	The church has now been completely modernised, the building being the centre for Levenshulme Inspire, housing flats, cafes, shops and a community meeting space
Madina Mosque & UK Islamic Mission	Barlow Road	Muslim	Islamic centre opened c.1986. The Islamic centre is housed in the building which was originally St Peter's School built in 1854 and closed in 1982 Islamic centre still open and standing .
St Mark's Church	Barlow Road	Church of England	Built 1908, St Mark's was declared a grade II listed building on 6 June 1994.
St Mary of the Angels & St. Clare RC Church	Elbow Street	Roman Catholic	
St Peter's Church	Stockport Road	Church of England	Consecrated in 1860. In 1852 a donation of 1,445 square yards of land and £500 was made to Levenshulme to build a church. The donation came from a member of a family known for generous donations for churches, Charles Carill-Worsley. St Peter's School (directly behind the church) was built in 1854 and was used initially as a temporary place for the congregation to worship.

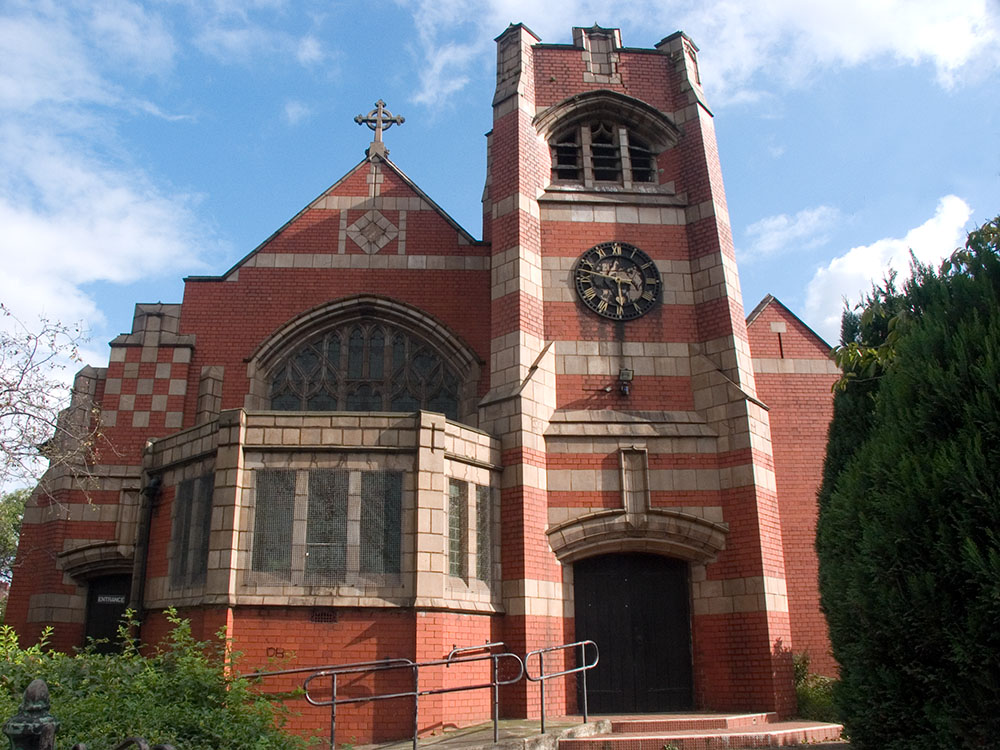
St Mark's Church

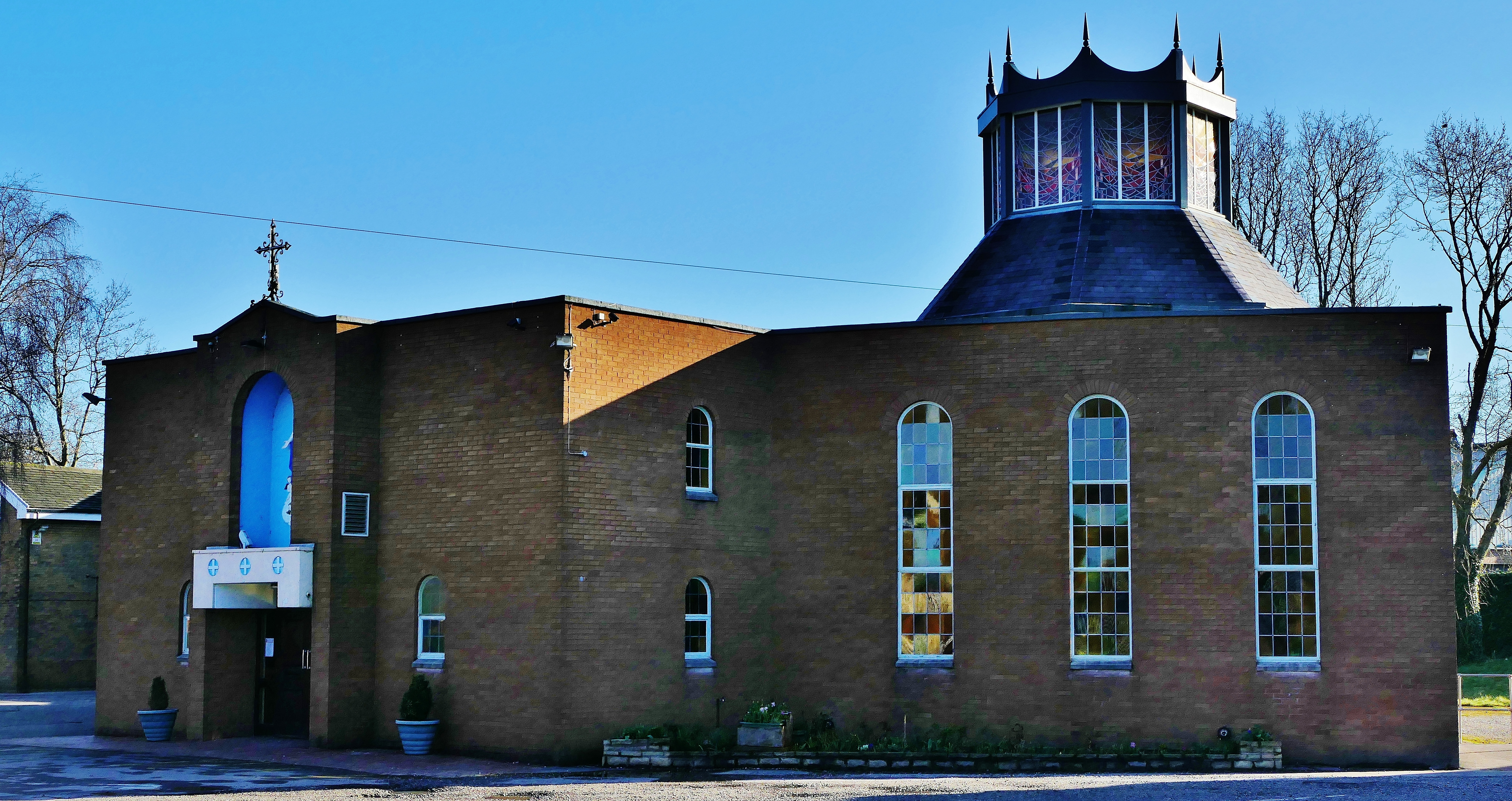
St Mary of the Angels Church

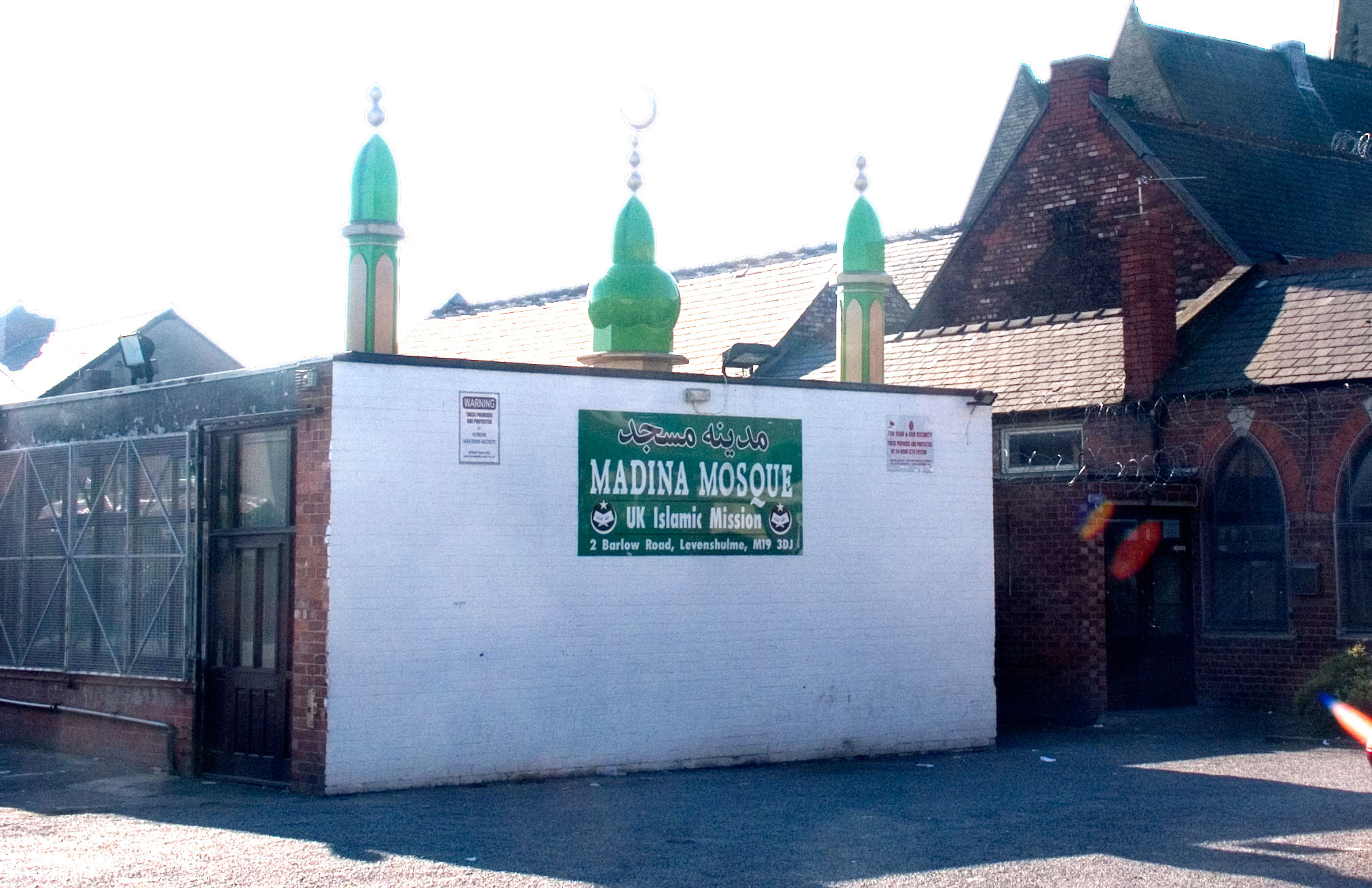
Madina Mosque & UK Islamic Mission

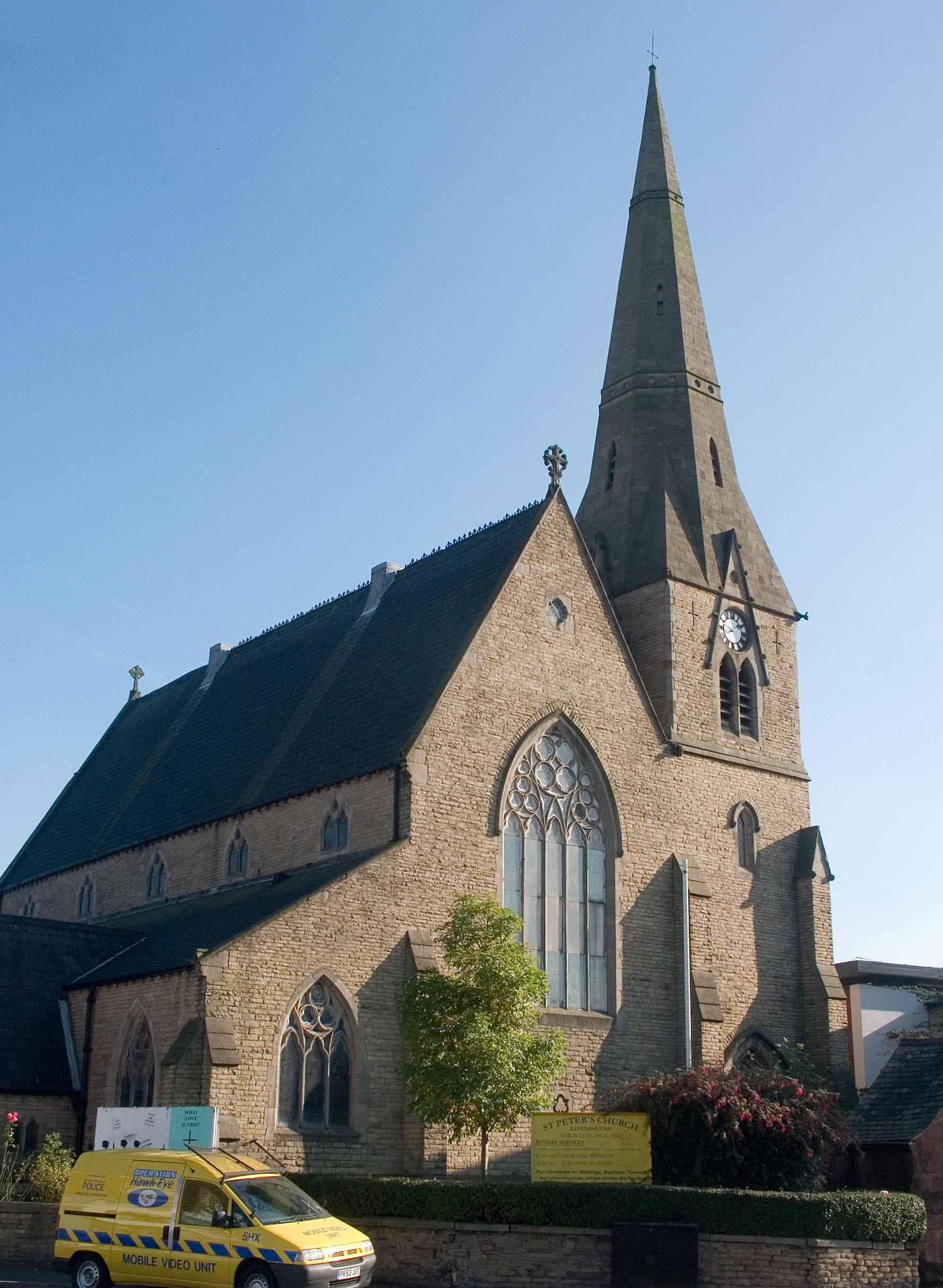
St Peter's Church

== Recreation and leisure ==
=== Parks ===
==== Green Bank Fields ====
This park is a green area stretching between Manor Road in the north, Mount Road in the east and Barlow Road in the south and west. It is primarily open grassland but also houses an open-air, enclosed 5-a-side football pitch adjacent to the Mount Road exit.

Until about 1920 the land that Green Bank Fields was on held a dairy farm called Green Bank Farm (Wolfenden's) and a small house called Botany Bay Cottage. The entrance to the farm was originally where the main entrance to the park is now on Barlow Road adjacent to Byrom Parade shops.

Manchester City Council fomented a local controversy by selling off part of Mellands (Greater Manchester Passenger Transport Executive) Playing Fields, Gorton to Dappa Homes to build 149 houses. Dappa is obliged to replace the land they are using to build the homes. In May 2004 Dappa Homes submitted plans to build 3 football pitches, a clubhouse and surround the park with a 10-foot fence on Green Bank Fields. This would have had the effect of reducing the versatile open-space into a restricted use site. The plans were later withdrawn by Dappa.

==== Highfield Country Park ====
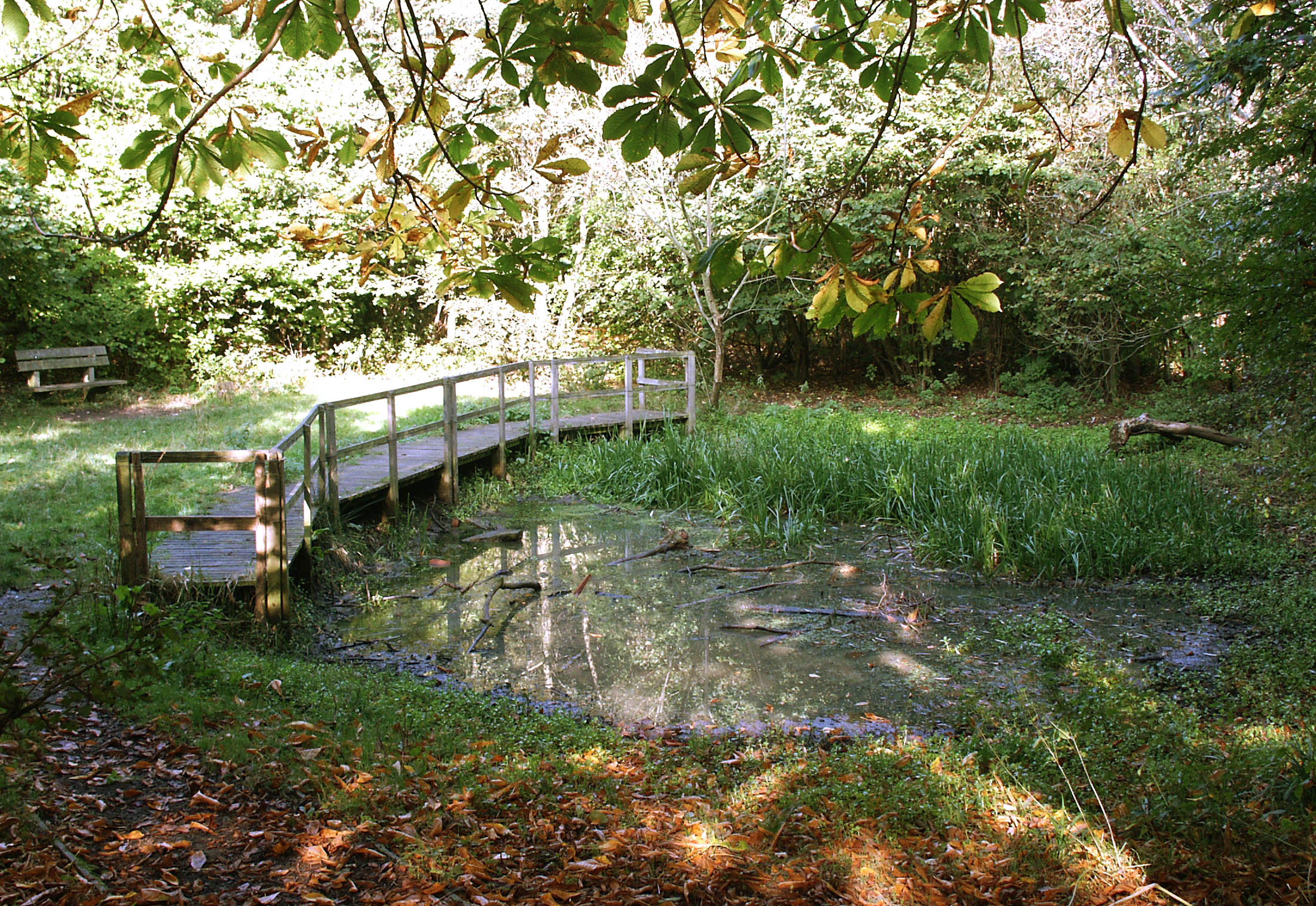
A small pond in the middle of Highfield Country Park

Highfield Country Park is a 70-acre (28 ha) area of open land that stretches to the east of Broom Avenue across to the back of Reddish Golf Course and over to the junction of Longford Road and Nelstrop Road.

In the 1970s it was designated as a country park by the council, but at the time it wasn't much more than a landfill site that was formerly the site of the UCP tripe factory, Jackson's Brickworks, Levenshulme Dye and Bleach Works and High Field Farm. The claypit formed by the extracted clay for the brickworks was much used by local children as a play area, known as "the Brickie".

Until 2004 the park was jointly maintained by Manchester City Council and a group of volunteers called the 'Friends of Highfield Park'. In July 2004 the park came to the attention of the Prudential Grass Roots campaign (run by the BTCV conservation charity). Over a 12-month period the park was transformed from a dreary, vandalised wasteland into a pleasant country park with a picnic area and mapped out country walks.

==== Nutsford Vale Country Park ====
Nutsford Vale is a formally declared 'open space' ensuring that it remains green space, and that it does not suffer from adverse building development. The area is a local oasis for bird life, insects and other wildlife, made up of rough grassland and a wide variety of trees, providing a home for a variety of plants and animal species. The Friends of Nutsford Vale and a committee provide a management and maintenance plan for the site. There are various access points with the main entrances located at the end of Bickerdike Avenue M12 5SZ and on Matthews Lane M19 3DS.

==== Cringle Park ====
Cringle Park is a recreational park located next to Levenshulme High School on Errwood Road, adjoining Crossley Road. It is a small park; however, it features facilities such as a children's play area, football court, basketball court, two tennis courts and a boxing club. A sundial in the centre of a Stonehenge was erected on top of a small hill in this park, which serves as an aesthetically pleasing spot for families to visit. A small mobile coffee shop on a bicycle serves drinks and snacks. Cringle Park is managed by Manchester City Council. It has a strong and active 'friends of' group, who support community events and actively campaign for improvements in the park.

=== Paths ===
The Fallowfield Loop shared use path passes through the suburb. It follows the route of the former Fallowfield Loop railway line, which was closed in October 1988. It is approximately eight miles (thirteen kilometres) long and connects Chorlton-cum-Hardy in the west with Fairfield in the east.

It can be accessed beside the site of the former Levenshulme South railway station on the A6.

=== Sport ===
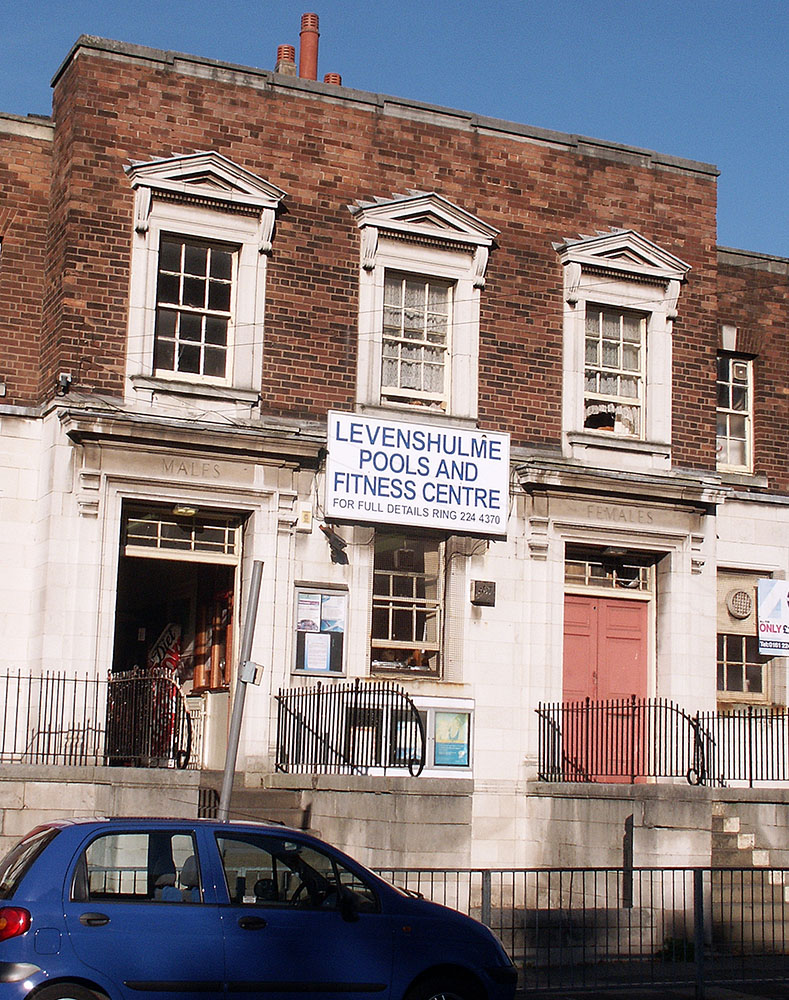
Levenshulme Swimming Baths

Levenshulme Swimming Baths was built in the late 19th century and was formerly called "Levenshulme Public Baths and Washhouse" as it also housed the public washhouse at the side.

In the late 1920s and early 1930s Levenshulme Baths was used as a training pool for Longsight resident Sunny Lowry, who, in 1933, was the first British woman to swim the English Channel (from France to England).

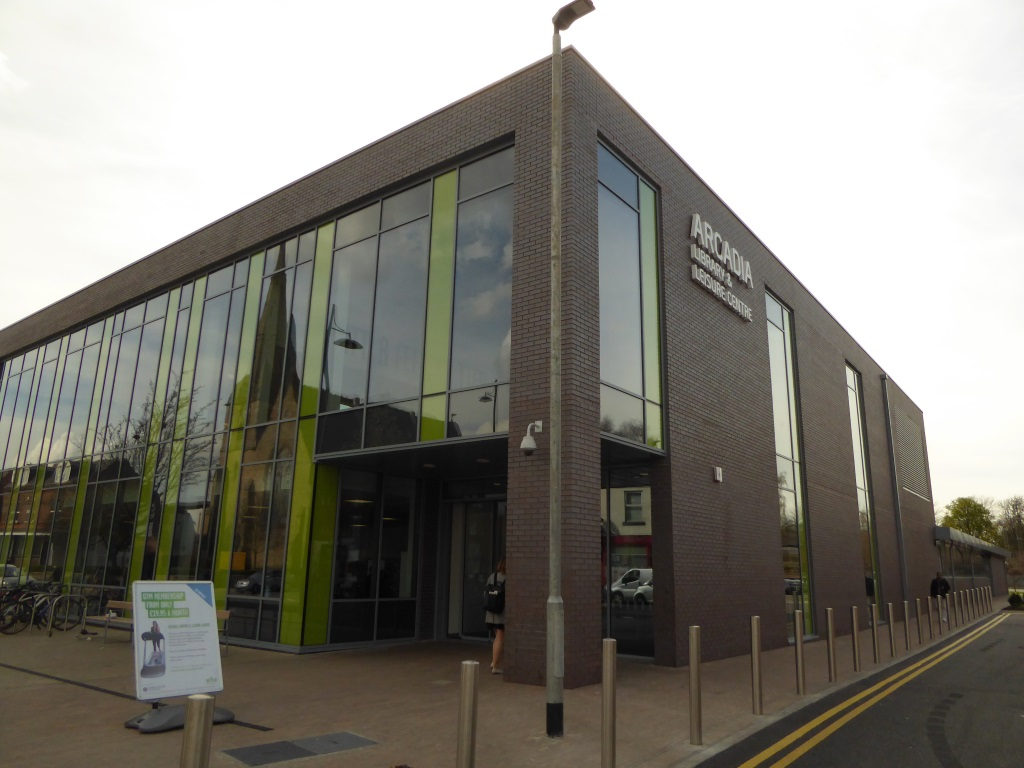
Arcadia Library & Leisure Centre

Located on Yew Tree Avenue, this sports facility was formerly home to Manchester Roller Hockey Club and affectionately known to locals as "the Shed".

On 20 February 2016, the new Arcadia Leisure Centre opened on the site of the old sports hall.

=== Community ===
==== Library ====
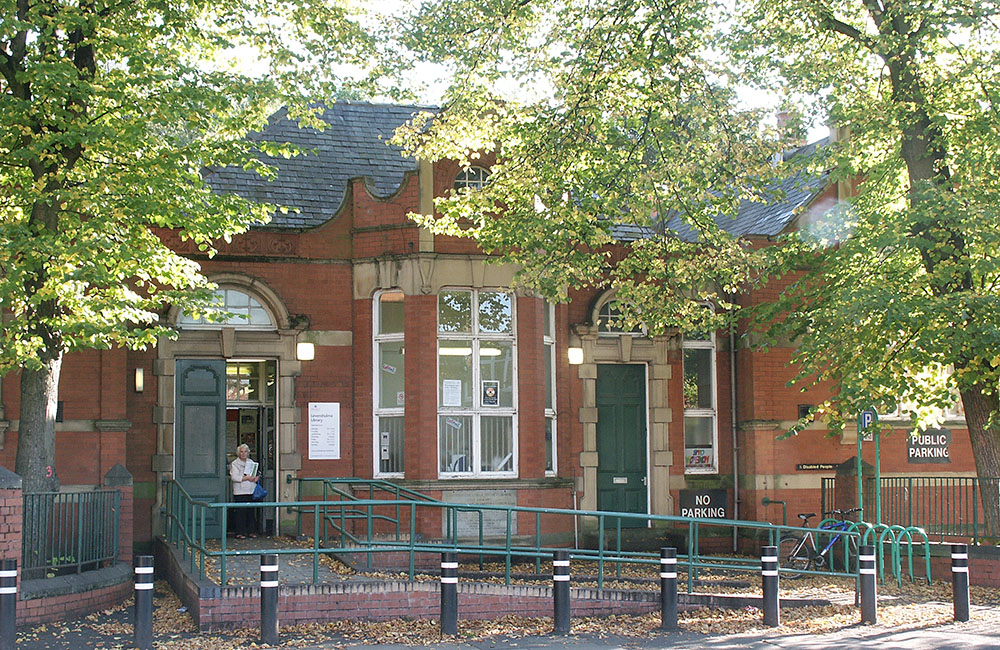
Levenshulme Public Library

Levenshulme Library is a "Carnegie library" as it was gifted to the people of Levenshulme by industrialist and philanthropist Andrew Carnegie. The ceremonial laying of the first brick (in reality an engraved stone plaque) took place on 5 December 1903. The stone was laid by George Paulson in his role as Chairman of the Free Library Committee. The library actually opened its doors to the public in 1904. At the time the money was gifted there was a minor local furore as some Levenshulme residents expressed the opinion that it was "immoral" for the then urban district council to accept the money from Carnegie as they believed the money to be "tainted". This was allegedly due to Carnegie's suppression of trade unions in the United States.

In 2012 proposals were put forward by Manchester Council to replace the library by a new building shared with the replacement for the swimming pools. In 2013 these proposals were amended to close both library and pools immediately and to only provide a reduced "book drop-off" service. These proposals were strongly contested by local groups and the building was symbolically taken over for a 24-hour "read-in" as a protest. In February 2016, the library was closed and was replaced by the new Arcadia Library and Leisure Centre on Stockport Road.

== Education ==
Levenshulme has five primary schools: Alma Park, Chapel Street, St Andrew's CE, St Mary's RC and Cringle Brook Primary School.

Levenshulme High School is on Crossley Road. There are other nearby secondary schools, including Burnage Academy for Boys.

== Transport ==
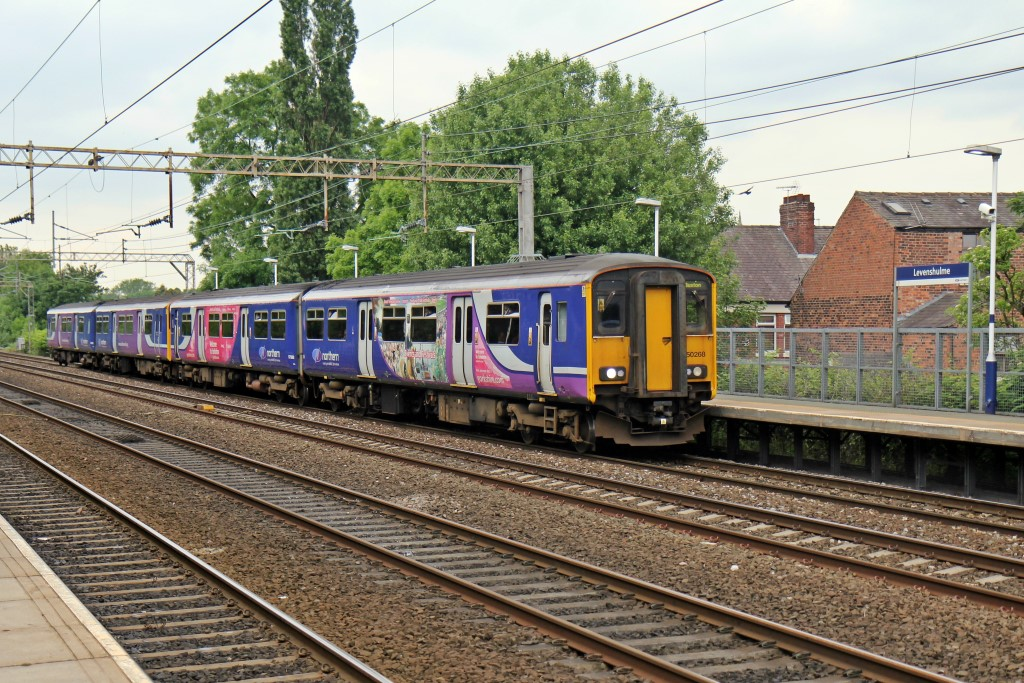
A Northern Rail diesel multiple unit stops at the station.

A spur of the West Coast Main Line passes through Levenshulme, which is located between Manchester Piccadilly and Stockport. The area is served by Levenshulme railway station, which provides local Northern stopping services between Manchester, Stockport and locations in Cheshire.

The suburb was once served by Levenshulme South railway station. It was sited on the Fallowfield Loop railway line, which closed to passenger services in 1958; the former trackbed is now a shared-use path between Chorlton and Fairfield.

Bus services in the area are provided by Stagecoach Manchester, connecting Levenshulme with Manchester city centre, Gorton, Hazel Grove, Stockport, and the Trafford Centre. The 192 between Picadilly and Hazel Grove, according to Stagecoach, is the busiest bus route in Great Britain, with around 9 million passengers carried annually. The service runs every 5–10 minutes daily until the late hours.

The A6, which connects Carlisle with Luton, passes through Levenshulme; it connects the suburb with Stockport and Manchester city centre. As part of the Bee Network, the Levenshulme and Burnage Active Neighbourhood was partially completed in 2023 with a series of filters throughout the neighbourhood to help encourage active travel trips.

== Tourism ==
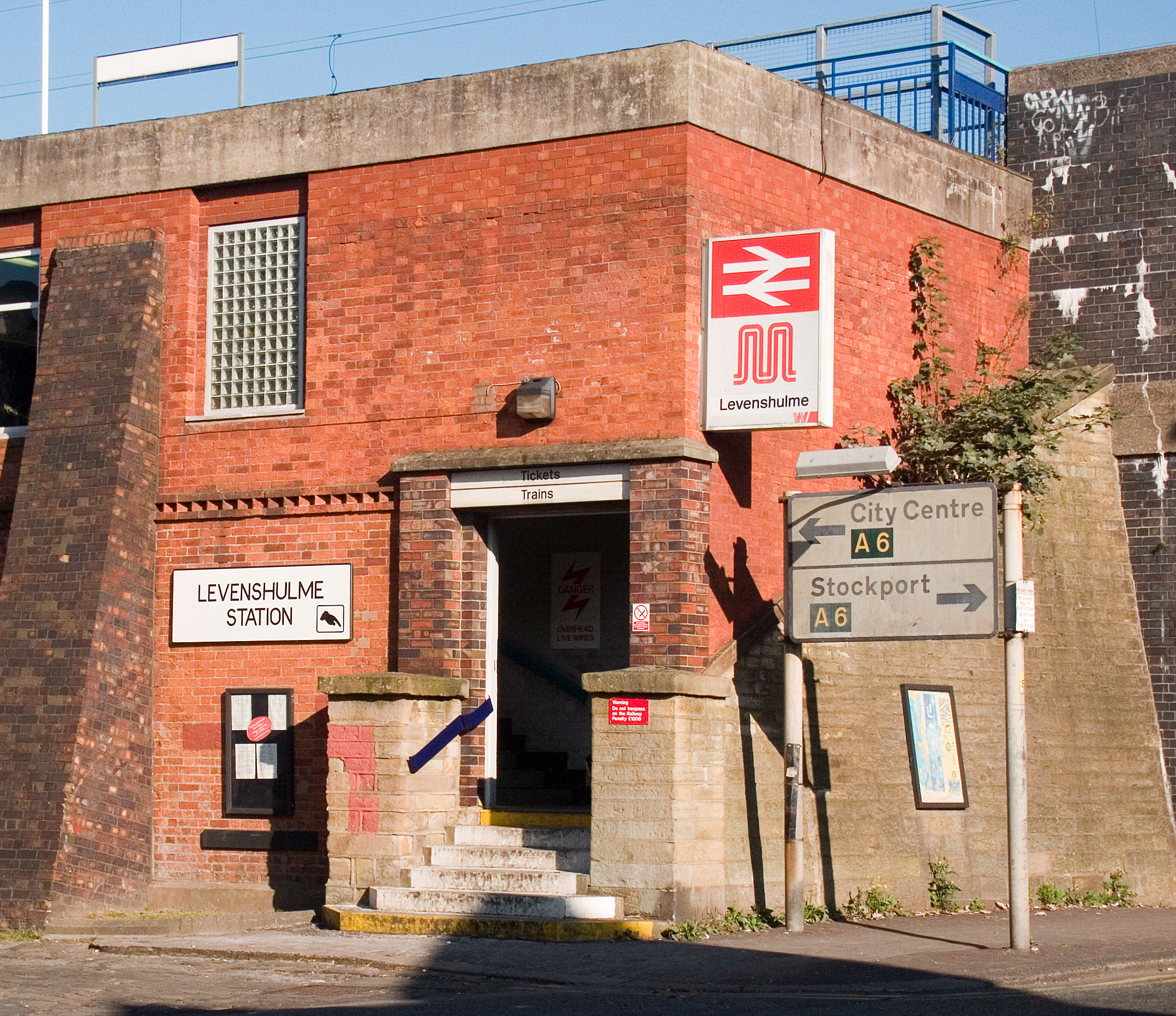
Levenshulme railway station

Due to several reports in both local and national newspapers, and on several internet blogs, tourists are now making visits to Levenshulme railway station since the news broke of a street with no name in the area.

The street that the railway station is on is 160 years old and 77 yards (70 metres) long, yet it has no official name and never has had. In May 2007, as a benefit of a £5,000 grant awarded to the Friends of Levenshulme Station by the Awards For All lottery grants scheme, an unofficial road sign was erected at the entrance to the street. The sign gave the name of the street as The Street With No Name. According to local residents, the street had been informally called this for years and it seemed appropriate that it now had a sign so that people could find it. The first sign was fitted approximately three feet (one metre) from the ground, but was stolen a short time later. The replacement was refitted 12 feet (3.7 m) above the road so as to discourage would-be thieves, although the sign is still stolen regularly.

== Notable people ==
- Harry Hancock (1874–1924), former professional footballer
- Ernest Marples (1907–1978), Conservative politician
- Arthur Lowe (1915–1982), actor best known for playing Captain Mainwaring on Dad's Army
- Eileen Burgoyne (1915–2013), a British spy during the Cold War who worked for the British Government after the Second World War
- Beryl Reid (1919–1996), actress; attended Levenshulme High School
- Norman Foster (born 1935), architect of buildings including The Gherkin and London City Hall
- Terry Callaghan (born 1945), biologist and ecologist specialising in the Arctic
- Wayne Fontana (1945–2020), rock and pop singer and part of the Mindbenders
- Gwyneth Powell (1946–2022), actress best known for playing headmistress Bridget McClusky on Grange Hill
- Tony McCarroll (born 1971), drummer and one of the founding members of the Manchester rock band Oasis
- Graeme Hawley (born 1975), actor best known for playing John Stape on Coronation Street

== See also ==
- Listed buildings in Manchester-M19
- ALL FM
