= Abbey Hey =

Area of Manchester, England

Coordinates: 53°28′05″N 2°09′36″W

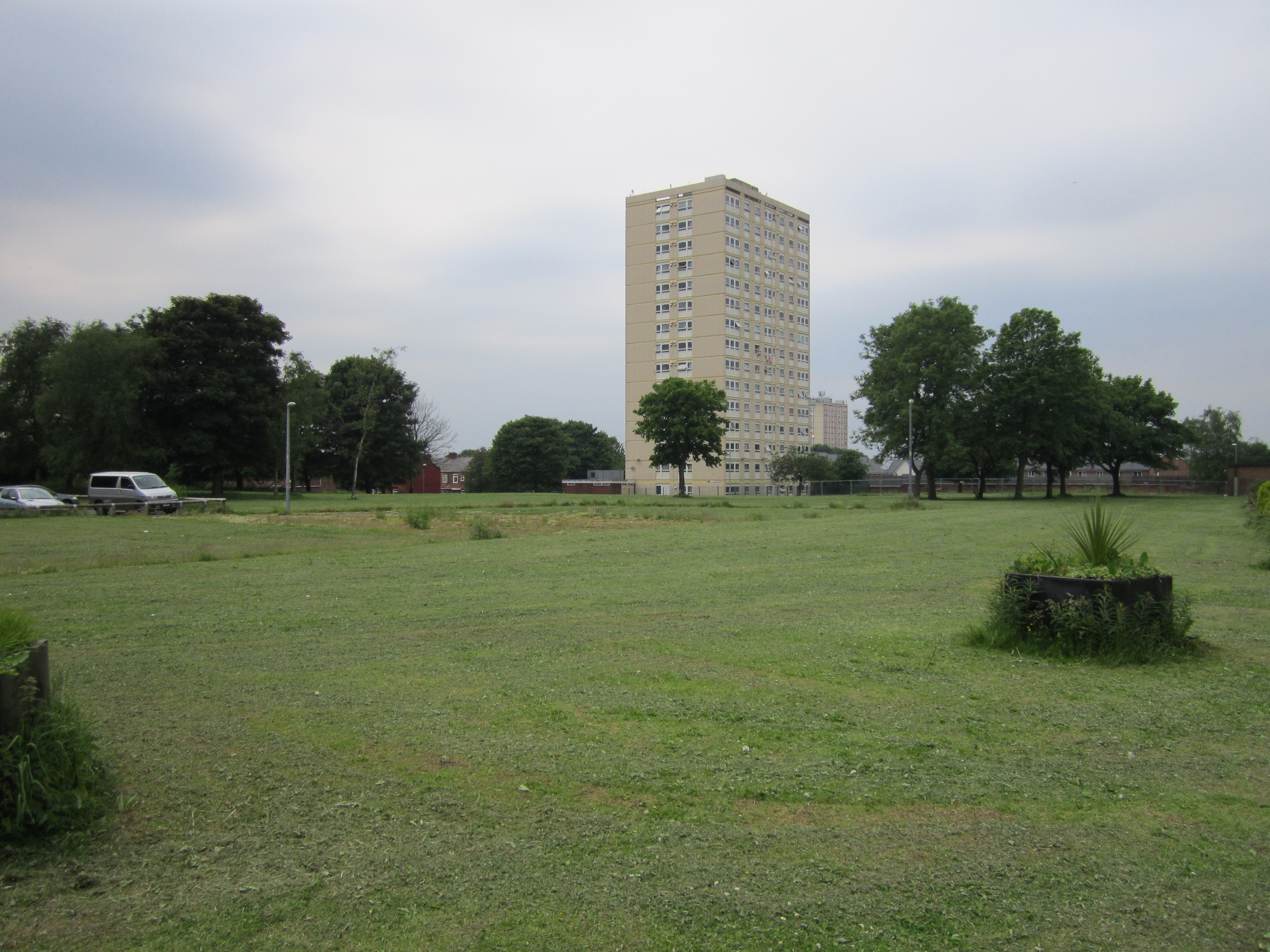
- Tower blocks near Abbey Hey

- Location within Greater Manchester
- OS grid reference: SJ875965
- Metropolitan borough: Manchester
- Metropolitan county: Greater Manchester
- Region: North West
- Country: England
- Sovereign state: United Kingdom
- Post town: MANCHESTER
- Postcode district: M18
- Dialling code: 0161
- Police: Greater Manchester
- Fire: Greater Manchester
- Ambulance: North West
- UK Parliament: Gorton and Denton

Abbey Hey is an area of Gorton, in the city of Manchester, England. It is known mainly for Debdale Park and Wright Robinson College.

== Borders ==
The neighbourhood is bordered on the east by the former Stockport Branch Canal (now Yellow Brick Road, a cycle path), on the north by the Hope Valley Line/Glossop line, on the south and west side by the former Fallowfield Loop railway line (now Fallowfield Loop). The police district is slightly bigger, incorporating the area between the Canal and Chapman Street and the area north of the Gorton Reservoirs in Debdale Park.

== Sports ==
Although it is located just outside the boundaries, the local football club is Abbey Hey F.C.

== Transport ==
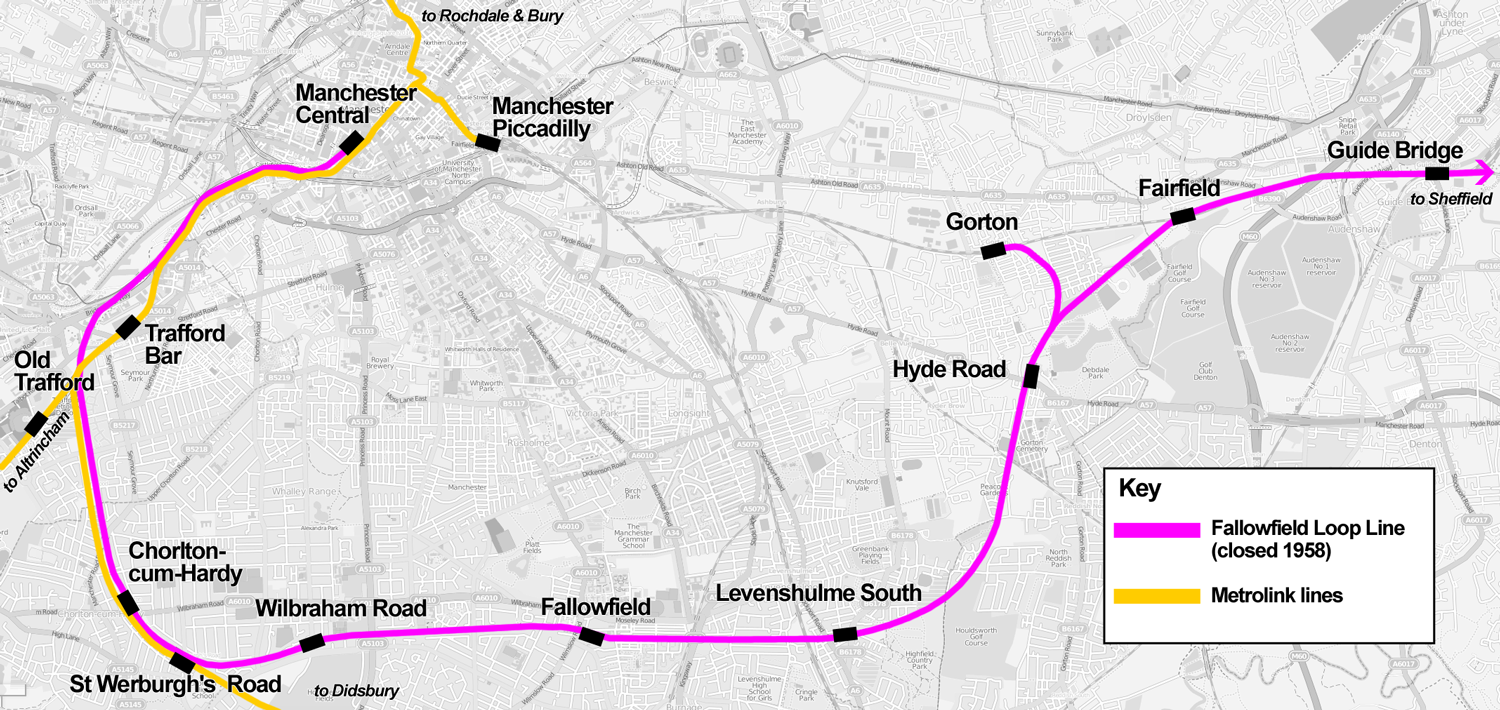
Fallowfield Loop. See the spur between Hyde Road Station and Gorton

Its location causes easy transport to Manchester city centre to be provided by rail at the Gorton railway station and by a variety of Bee Network bus routes.

The Fallowfield Loop railway line was built by the Manchester, Sheffield and Lincolnshire Railway in 1891 in what was then rural countryside. The section between Fallowfield and Fairfield opened in May 1892. It had a loop back to Manchester along Vine Street. This spur is now filled in and partly park and partly housing. Passenger services on the line and spur ended in 1958 when the regular local passenger connection were withdrawn. Through passenger trains still used the Loop until 1969 after the closure of Manchester Central railway station when lines got rerouted to other stations in Manchester. The line was still used by freight trains, until British Rail in 1988 decided not to upgrade the line and closed it down instead. The tracks were lifted in 1991.

In the late 1940s, British Rail was planning electrification for the line between Manchester and Sheffield via the Woodhead Tunnel. The original scheme would have included the Fallowfield Loop but this was later dropped.

== Governance ==
The area is in the Gorton and Denton constituency), which has been represented in Westminster by Hannah Spencer of the Green Party since the February 2026 by-election. Andrew Gwynne previously held the seat, and stood for the Labour Party until he was suspended from that party.

Following a boundary review in 2017, the Local Government Boundary Commission for England announced that Abbey Hey would form part of a new electoral ward named Gorton and Abbey Hey for the local elections 2018. Abbey Hey had previously been part of Gorton North electoral ward.

== Gallery ==
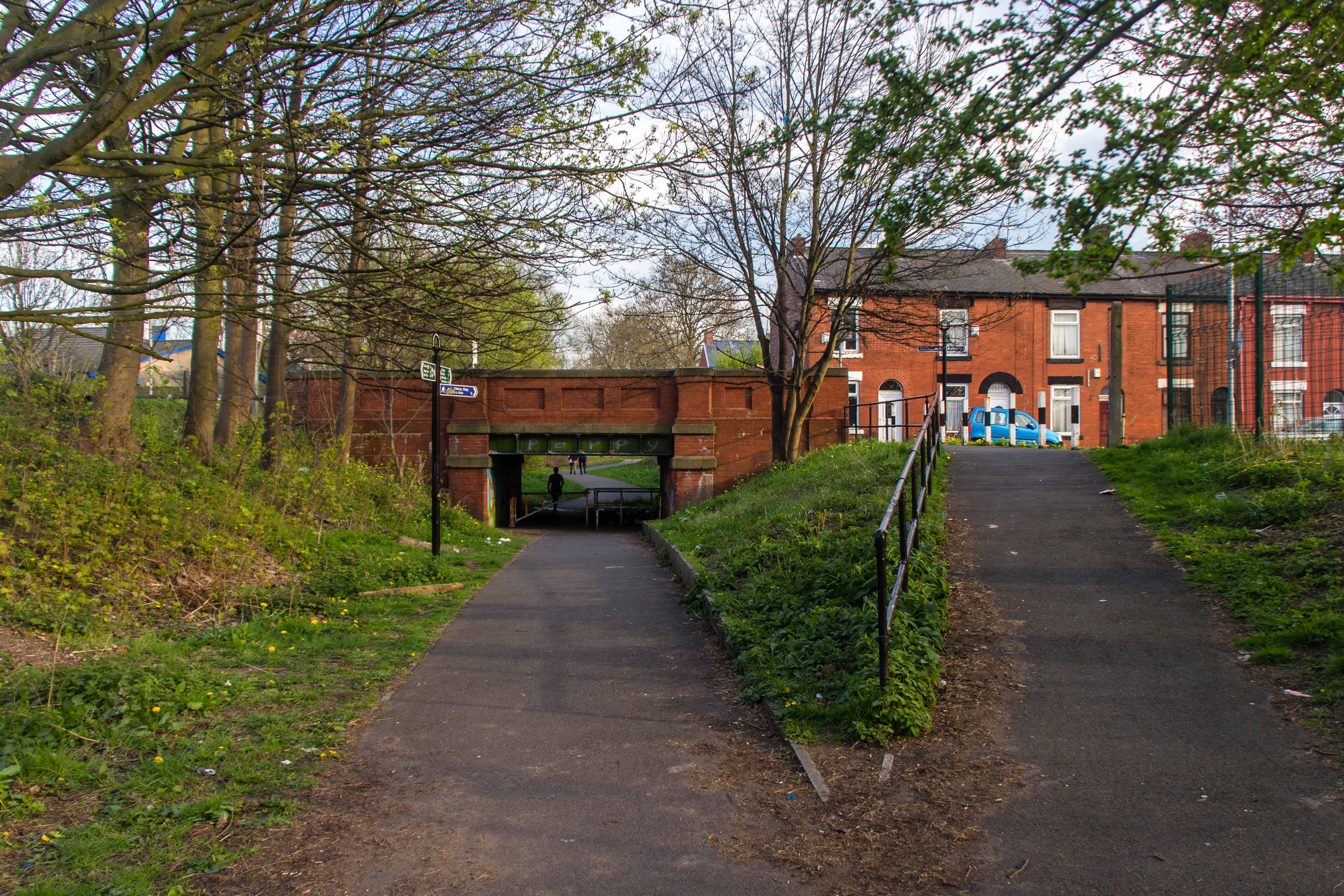
The bridge over the former Stockport Branch Canal on Abbey Hey Lane

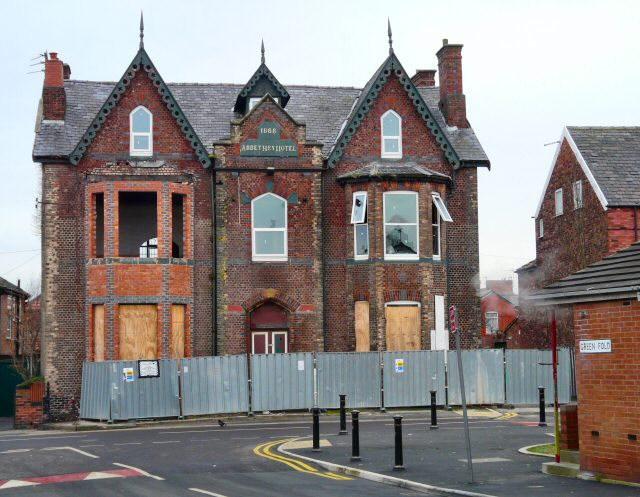
Abbey Hey Hotel. Built 1868. Closed 2004, demolished 2013

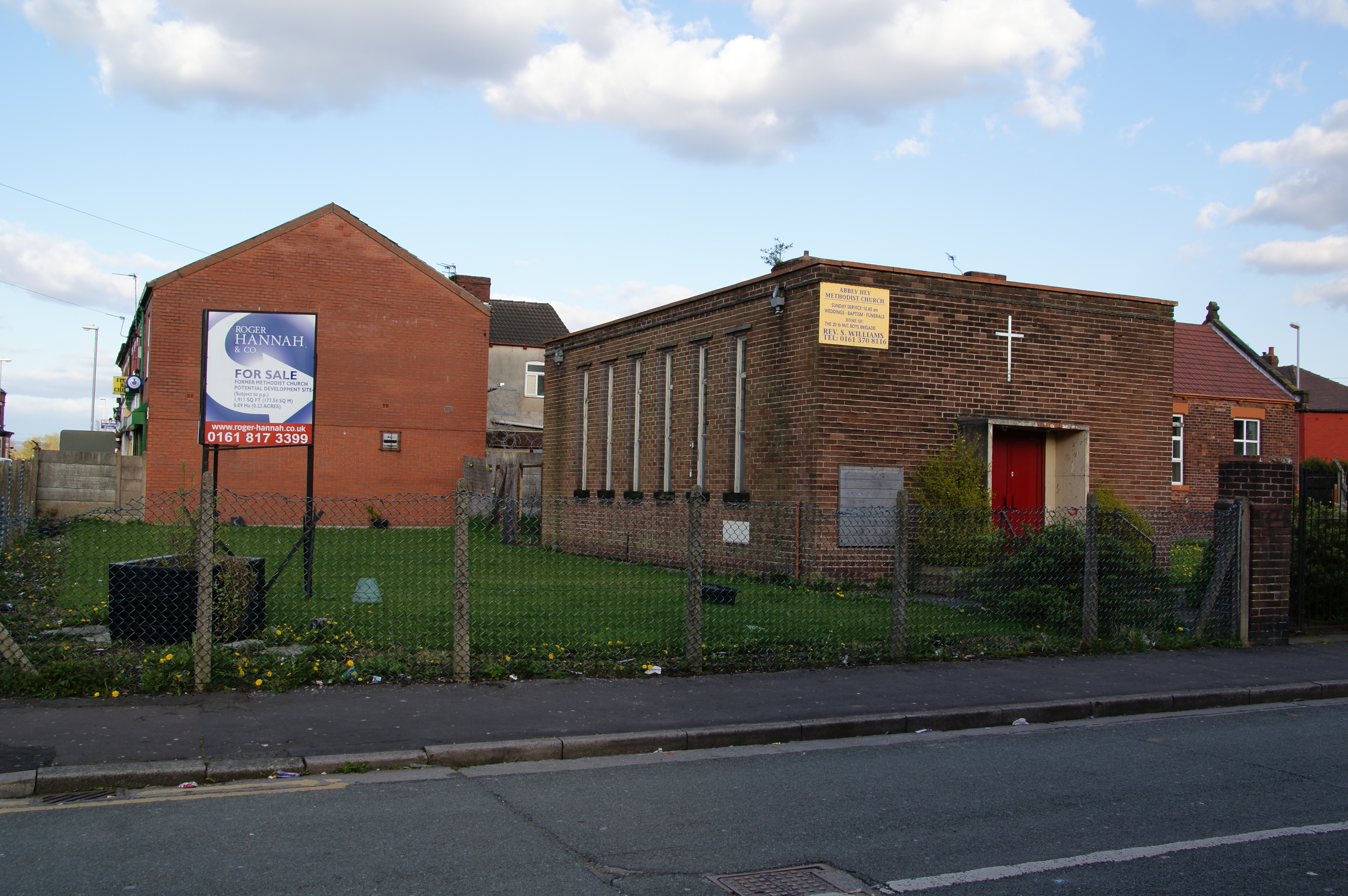
The former Methodist Church on Harrop Street

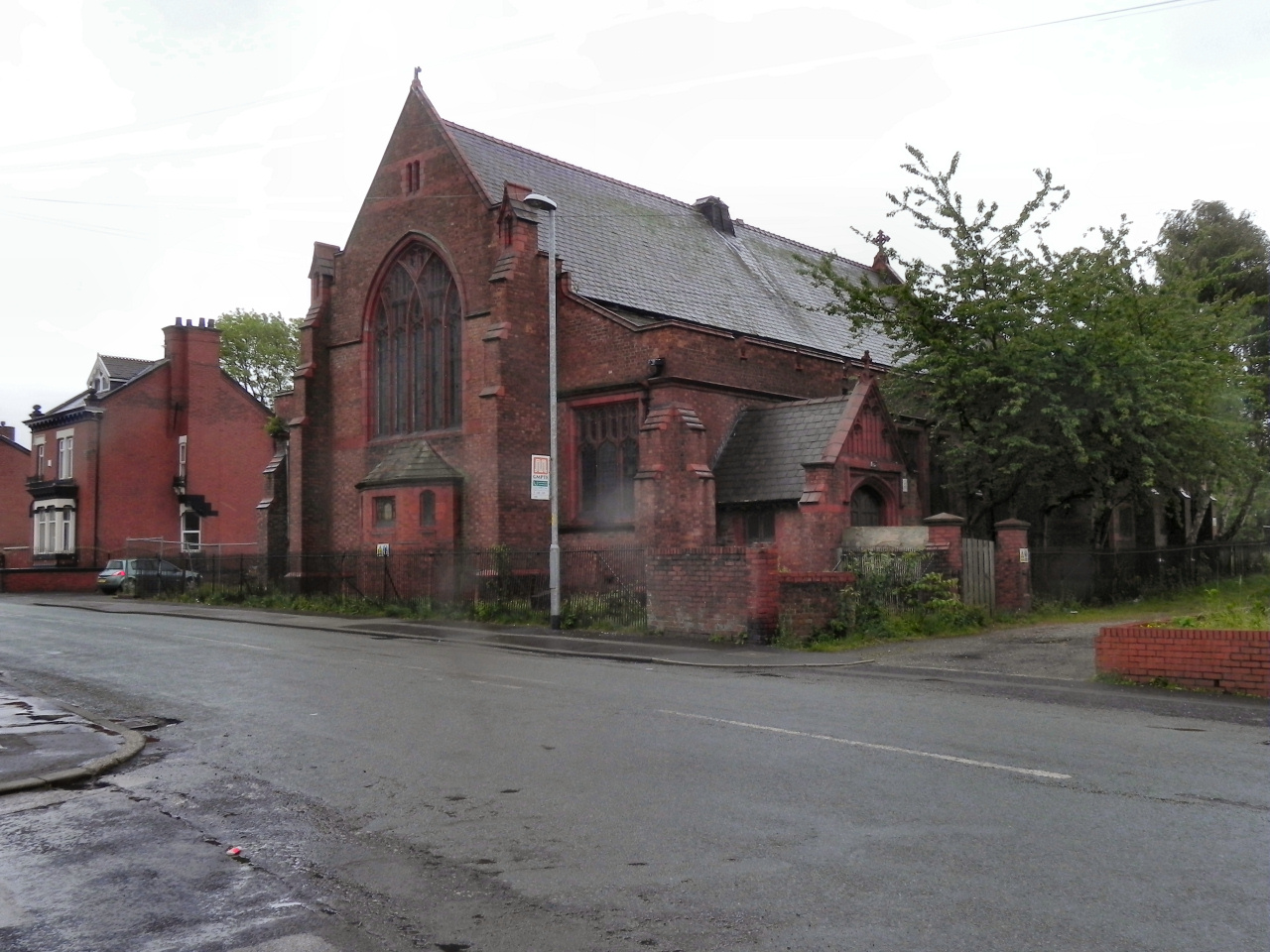
Former Church of St George the Martyr

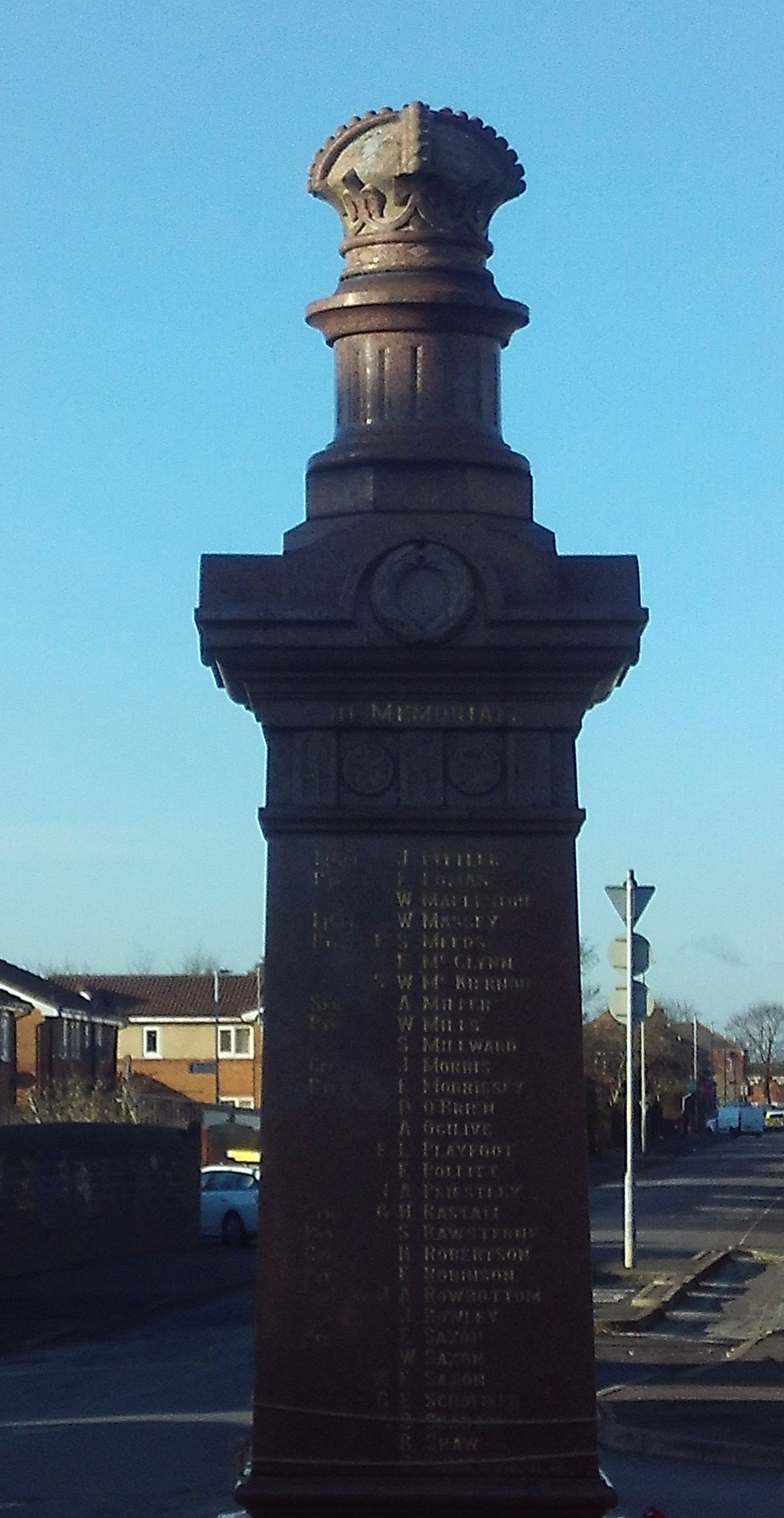
Abbey Hey War Memorial
