= Highfield Country Park =

Local Nature Reserve in Manchester, England

Coordinates: 53.4406°N 2.1790°W

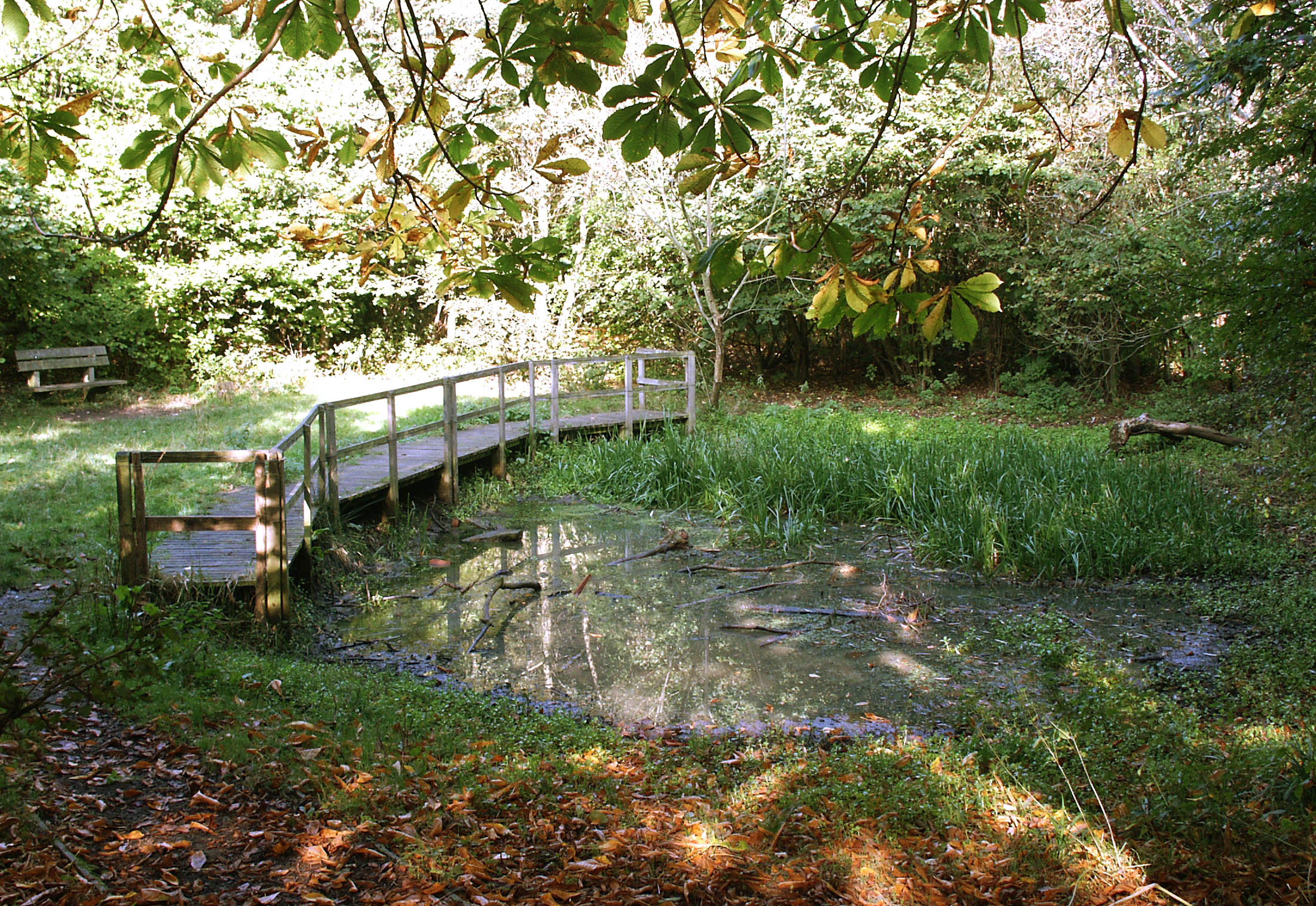
A small pond in the middle of Highfield Country Park

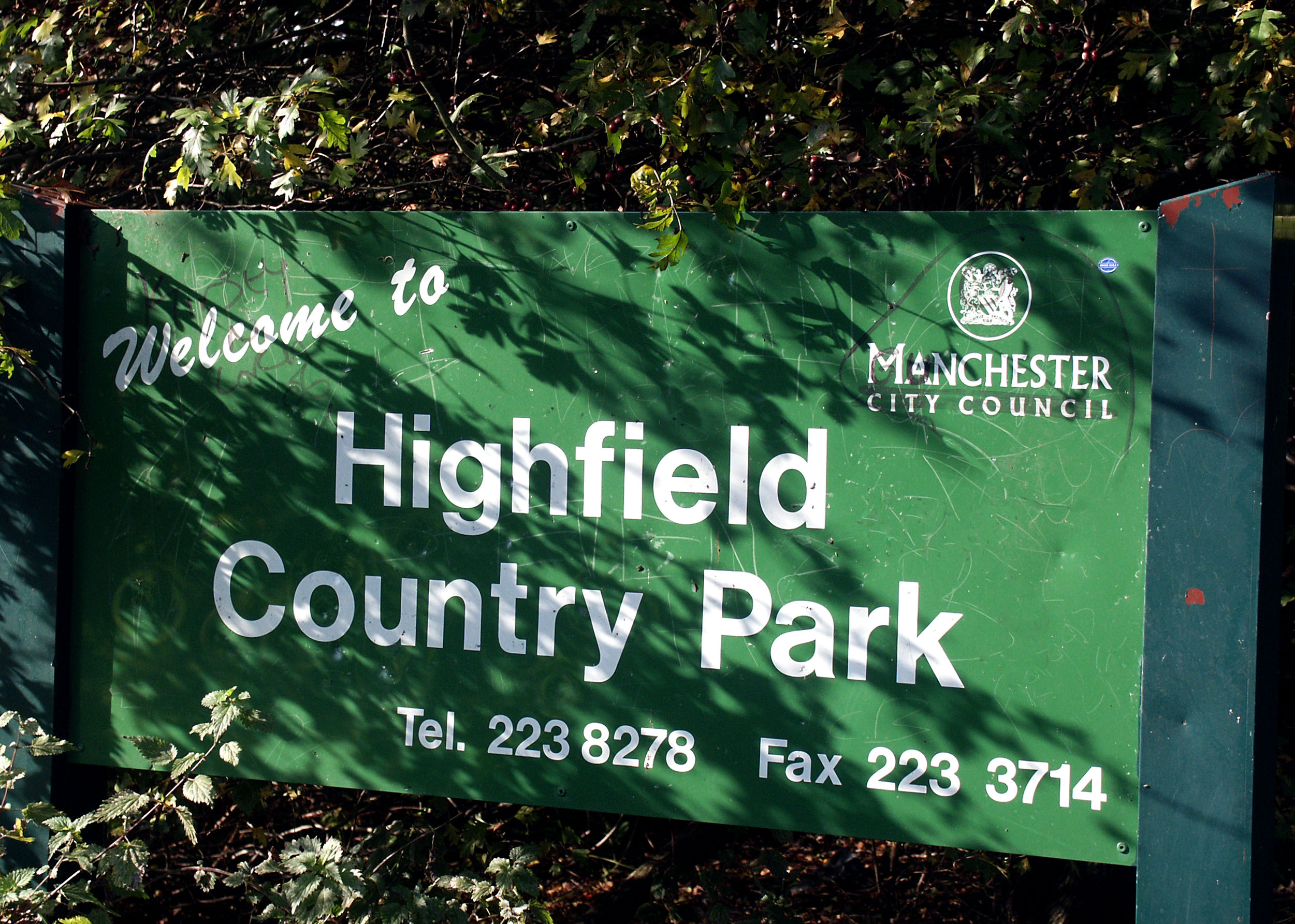
Sign at entrance to the park

Highfield Country Park is a 70-acre (280,000 m^{2}) area of open land, situated on the east side of Levenshulme, Manchester, that stretches to the east of Broom Avenue across to the rear of Reddish Golf Course and to the junction of Longford Road, Reddish and Nelstrop Road, Levenshulme.

Prior to 2004, the park was jointly maintained by Manchester City Council and a group of volunteers called The Friends of Highfield Park. In July 2004 the park came to the attention of the Prudential Grass Roots campaign (run by the BTCV conservation charity). Over a 12-month period the park was transformed from a dreary, vandalised wasteland into a country park with a picnic area and mapped out country walks.

In 2008 Highfield Country Park was designated a Local Nature Reserve, providing a protected habitat for many animal and plant species.

== History of the site ==
The land was used to extract clay for the manufacture of bricks for the building industry.

The clay pit and brickworks existed at the start of the 20th century, and by the 1950s was being operated by the Jackson Brick Company.

In the 1970s, it was designated as a country park by the council, but at the time it was little more than a landfill site and sometime site of the UCP tripe factory, Levenshulme Dye and Bleach works, High Field Farm, and Jackson's brickworks. The latter's clay pit was much used by local children as a play area known as "The Brickie".

“The excavations were dotted with numerous ponds & small lakes, and it is likely that some children were badly injured while playing there”
