= Levenshulme Antiques Village =

Municipal building in Levenshulme, Greater Manchester, England

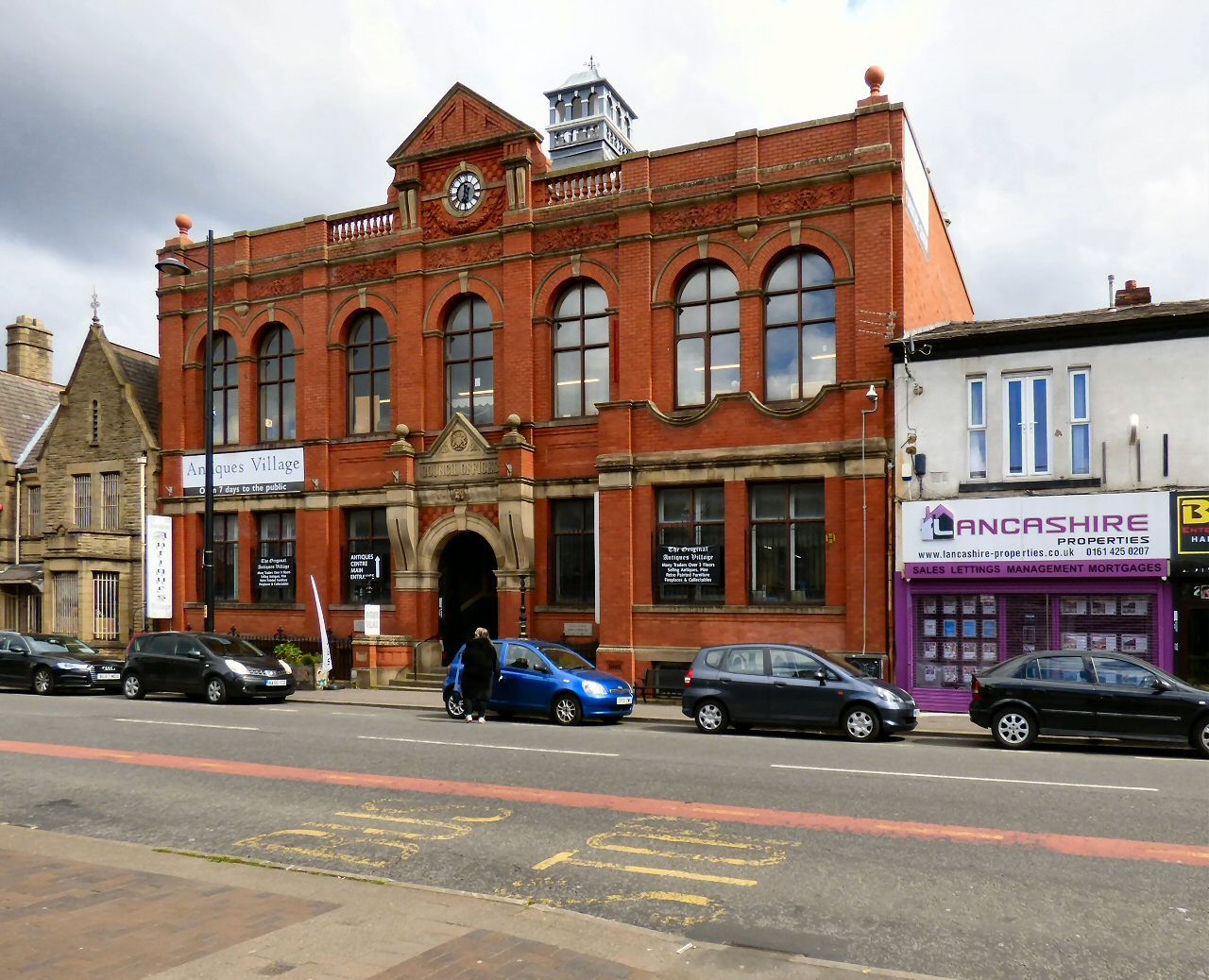
- The building in 2019

- Shown in Greater Manchester
- 53.4414°N 2.1889°W
- Location: Stockport Road, Levenshulme

History
- Built: 1899

Site notes
- Architect: James Jepson
- Architectural style: Italianate style

Levenshulme Antiques Village, formerly Levenshulme Town Hall, is a former municipal building on Stockport Road in Levenshulme, a suburb of Manchester in England. The building served as the offices and meeting place of Levenshulme Urban District Council, and now accommodates an antiques centre.

== History ==
Following significant population growth, largely associated with its status as a growing residential suburb of Manchester, a local board of health was established in Levenshulme in 1865. After the local board of health was succeeded by Levenhulme Urban District Council in 1894, the new council decided to commission dedicated council offices. The site they selected was open land on the east side of Stockport Road, just north of the Fallowfield Loop railway line.

Construction of the new building stated in 1897. It was designed by James Jepson in the Italianate style, built by Burgess and Galt in red brick with ashlar stone finishings at a cost of £6,000 and was officially opened on 3 March 1899. Two reading rooms were installed in the building and were opened by the chairman of the Manchester Libraries Committee, Alderman James Wilson Southern, on 22 September 1899.

The building ceased to be the local seat of government in 1909, when the district was annexed by the City of Manchester. Manchester City Council continued to use it to deliver services until 1990, when it was sold off and converted into an antiques centre. The antiques centre houses dealers selling furniture, fittings and smaller items, while outbuildings in the courtyard are used as workshops.

== Architecture ==
The design involves a symmetrical main frontage, 75 feet wide, of seven bays facing onto Stockport Road. The central bay features a round headed opening with an architrave and a keystone. The entrance is flanked by brackets supporting a frieze, an entablature inscribed with the words "Council Offices", and a small triangular pediment containing a roundel. The other bays on the ground floor are fenestrated by cross-windows, and the first floor is fenestrated by round headed windows, which are flanked by pilasters supporting hood moulds and keystones. At roof level there is a partially balustraded parapet broken by a central clock face with a garland below and a pediment above. The main entrance leads into an octagonal hall, with entrances to rooms which originally served as the council chamber, and as offices for the clerk, surveyor, overseers, and sanitary inspector. There is a staircase to the former public hall, with two retiring rooms. Behind the building is a courtyard, with buildings originally containing stables, sheds, and the caretaker's house.
