= Levenshulme High School =

Location
- Crossley Road; Levenshulme; Manchester, Greater Manchester, M19 1FS; England
- Coordinates: 53.4372°N 2.1961°W

Information
- Type: Academy
- Local authority: Manchester
- Department for Education URN: 141196 Tables
- Ofsted: Reports
- Gender: Girls
- Age: 11 to 16
- Houses: Seacole, Nightingale, Parks and Keller
- Website: www.levenshulmehigh.co.uk

Levenshulme High School for Girls, also known as Levenshulme High School, is a girls' secondary school with academy status located in the Levenshulme area of Manchester, England.

== History ==
The school was opened by the Duchess of Atholl in 1929. The school previously had two sites, a lower school for pupils in their first two years on Moseley Road, and an upper school on the current site, the sites merged in 1986. The lower school was previously Moseley Road School

== Recent history ==
The school moved into a new building on the same site in 2011 with the original building being refurbished and reoccupied from 2012. Previously a community school administered by Manchester City Council, Levenshulme High School converted to academy status on 1 September 2014 and is now forms part of a multi-academy trust with Whalley Range High School.

The school has been used on well known Manchester based TV shows such as Queer as Folk, and in several episodes of Coronation Street, as Weatherfield Comprehensive.

== Notable former pupils ==
- Dorothy Bromiley, actress
- Pat Kirkwood, actress
- Beryl Reid, actress
