= UCP =

UCP may refer to:

== Education ==
- Universidade Católica de Petrópolis, a university in Brazil
- Universidade Católica Portuguesa, a university in Portugal
- University Centre Peterborough, a university centre in the United Kingdom
- University of Central Punjab, a university in Pakistan
- University of Cuenca del Plata
- An epithet denoting the Culture Collection of Catholic University of Pernambuco, Recife, Brazil

== Other organizations ==
- Union of Communist Parties, an organization for communist political parties in the countries of the former USSR
- United Cattle Products, a chain of shops and restaurants in the North of England, most famous for the sale of tripe.
- United Cerebral Palsy, a philanthropic coalition for persons with disabilities
- United Communist Party (Russia)
- United Conservative Party, a provincial political party in Alberta, Canada
- United Country Party, former name of the National Party of Australia
- Universal Content Productions, a television production company
- University of Chicago Press

== Other use ==
- HK UCP, a double-action handgun by Heckler & Koch
- Uncoupling protein
- Unified Command Plan
- Uniform Customs and Practice for Documentary Credits, an international standard for drawing up letters of credit
- Universal Camouflage Pattern, a digital pattern of the U.S. Army
- Universal Computer Protocol, a protocol used to connect to SMS services
- Universal Connection Pool, Oracle database feature
- Use Case Points, a software estimation technique used to forecast the software size for software development projects
- User Control Panel
- Microcontact printing (μCP)
