= Eileen Burgoyne =

British Cold War spy

Eileen Burgoyne (2 June 1915 – 6 April 2013) was a spy during the Cold War who worked for the British Government after the Second World War.

== Early life ==
Burgoyne was born 2 June 1915 at 148 Stockport Road, Levenshulme, Manchester, the daughter of Emmanuel Burgoyne and Jane Emmerson (née White). She studied French and Spanish at a college in Manchester.

== War service ==
At the outbreak of World War II, Burgoyne was living in the Withington area of Manchester. Service records show that she enlisted with the Women's Royal Army Corps first as a translator in the Latin American Section, then from 30 November 1942 as a Grade III secretary to the security services working out of Room 055 at the War Office under the command of Colonel Robin 'Tin Eye' Stephens, later serving under him at Latchmere House.

In July 1945. Burgoyne received a direct commission into the Intelligence Services, serving as a subaltern until January 1947 then as a J/Commander. She was posted to Germany to the Bad Nenndorf Combined Services District Interrogation Centre, where she was involved in the efforts to track down and interrogate Nazi war criminals. The CSDIC operated interrogation centres around the world, and Burgoyne is recorded as serving with them from 1945–1947 and from 1950–1953.

== Later life ==
Burgoyne was unmarried. For the last 20 years of her life, she lived at 26 Grimwood Drive in Twickenham, London, and died in hospital 6 April 2013 at the age of 97.

== Discovery ==
Information about Eileen Burgoyne's life as a spy emerged only after her death when weapons found by builders at her former home sparked a bomb scare leading to an evacuation of her street. Police later found possessions and documents which revealed her involvement in the intelligence services.

The BBC series Heir Hunters Series 12 Episode 11 focused on the case of Burgoyne, undertaking extensive research into her life and career, this episode was produced in November 2017 and broadcast in July 2018.
