= Gorton Reservoirs =

Pair of reservoirs in Greater Manchester, England

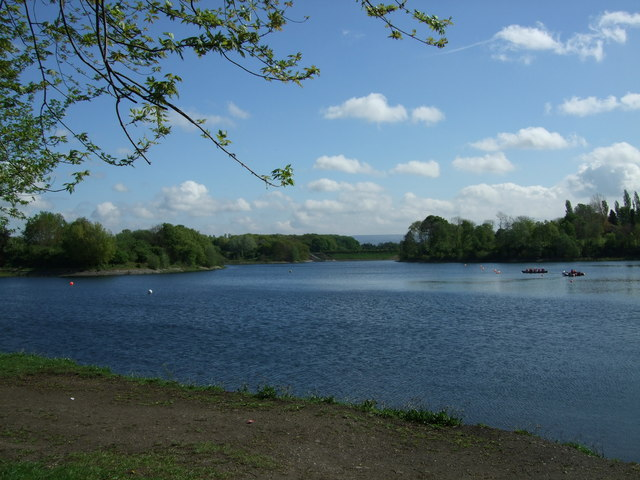
- Gorton Lower Reservoir. The Pennines are in the background between the trees.

- Location within Greater Manchester
- Location: Greater Manchester, England
- Coordinates: 53°27′38″N 2°09′27″W

Gorton Reservoirs are two reservoirs on the boundary of Tameside and Manchester in the North West of England. They are Gorton Upper Reservoir and Gorton Lower Reservoir. The upper and lower sections are separated by a road supported by a stone bridge consisting of a series of arches. They are owned and maintained by United Utilities.

The reservoirs were completed between 1825 and 1826 by the Manchester and Salford Waterworks Company. Able to supply almost 1 million imperial gallons of water per day to the city of Manchester and the surrounding area; they were used until 1963.
