= United Cattle Products =

Shop and restaurant chain in northern England

United Cattle Products (UCP) was a chain of shops and restaurants in the north of England which specialised in tripe dishes. In the 1950s there were 146 restaurants.
