= Kingsway (A34) =

Major thoroughfare in Greater Manchester, England

Kingsway

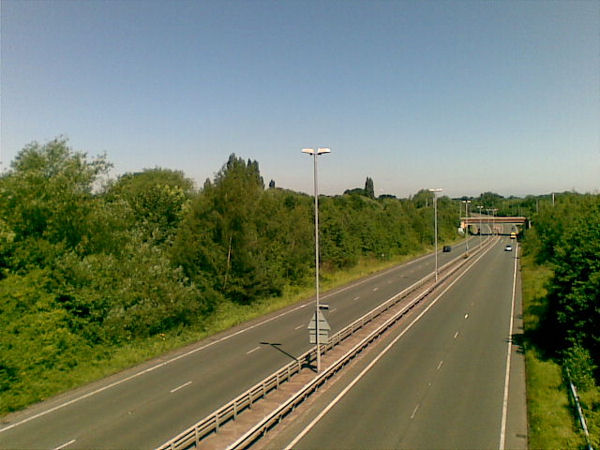
- Kingsway dual carriageway as it passes through Cheadle

Route information
- Length: 4.8 mi (7.7 km)
- History: Completed in 1930 as the A5079 and named after King George V; now part of the A34

Major junctions
- South end: Cheadle (53.380°N 2.221°W)
- North end: Levenshulme (53.442°N 2.206°W)

Location
- Country: United Kingdom
- Constituent country: England
- Primary destinations: East Didsbury, Parrs Wood, Burnage, Ladybarn

Road network
- Roads in the United Kingdom; Motorways; A and B road zones

Kingsway is a dual carriageway in Greater Manchester, England, which runs from Levenshulme to Cheadle. It is approximately 7.3 mi (11.7 km) long and is a link road between the city centre and the southern suburbs of Greater Manchester, forming part of the A34. Kingsway was built in the late 1920s between Levenshulme and Parrs Wood, and was originally designed as a combined road and tram route. The tram tracks were eventually removed and the road was later extended to bypass Cheadle and join onto the M60 motorway.

== History ==
Kingsway past and present

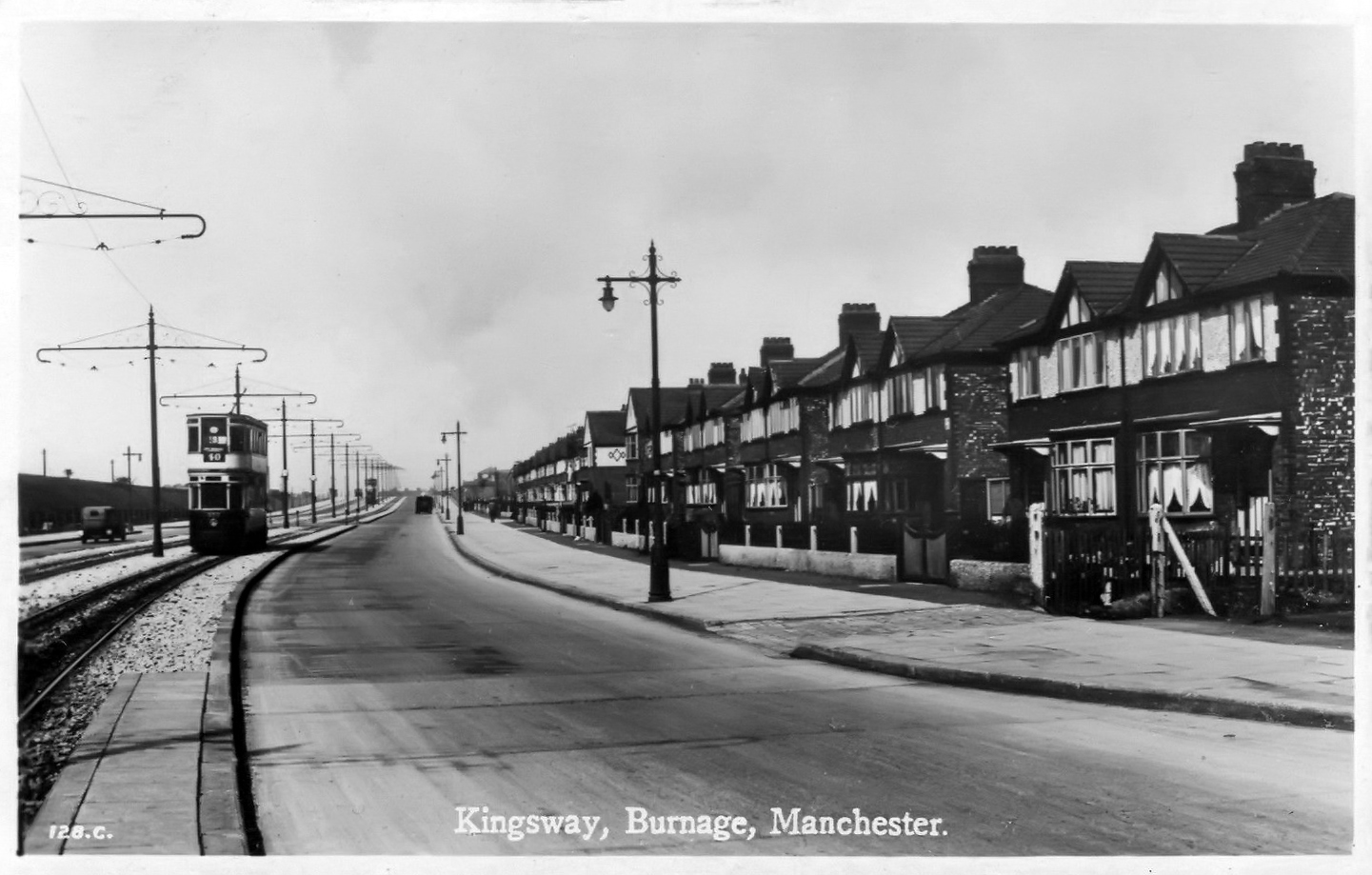
A 1930s photograph of Kingsway in Burnage with a Corporation Tram travelling on the central reservation

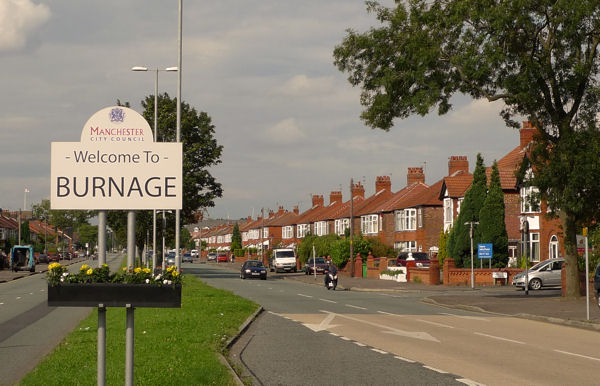
Kingsway as it appears today, with a grassed central reservation

Kingsway was constructed in stages from the mid-1920s and completed in 1930. It was named after King George V and was originally numbered A5079.

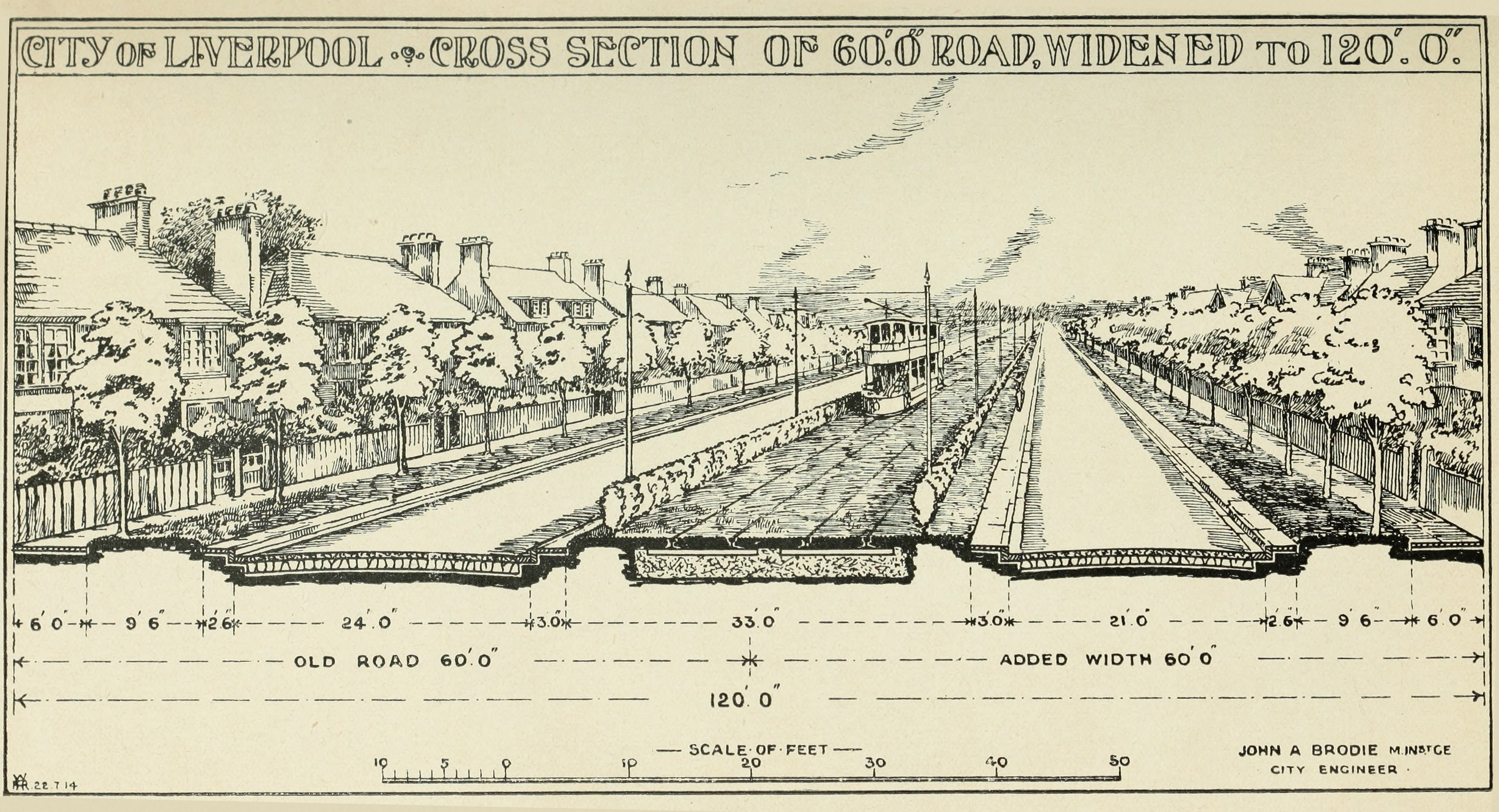
1914 illustration of Brodie's dual carriageway layout with a central segregated tram track in Liverpool, which informed the layout of Kingsway

Kingsway was built as a relief road for the congested Wilmslow Road to the west and it was one of the earliest purpose-built roads especially for motor vehicles. Like Princess Road further to the west, Kingsway was designed as a dual carriageway along the "Brodie System", a new civil engineering technique that had been pioneered by John Alexander Brodie in Liverpool, in which the central reservation incorporated reserved track for trams.

On either side of the new road, the Manchester Corporation bought up 1,165 acres (4.71 km^{2}) of land to build the Kingsway Housing Scheme, a large council housing scheme to tackle the acute housing shortage in the city. Around 1,200 houses were built, along with amenities including new schools, quickly turning a rural area into a sizeable suburban council estate.

Manchester Corporation Tramways eventually ceased operation in 1949 and the tram tracks were removed. In 1959, Kingsway was extended south across the River Mersey to bypass Cheadle. It was later renumbered to A34 in 1967.

== Route ==
Kingsway runs in a south-westerly direction until the junction with the M60 motorway, when it curves around to run south-east. It begins in Levenshulme continuing from Slade Lane, and heads south-west through Fallowfield, Ladybarn, Burnage, and Parrs Wood where it originally ended. It continues south-west through East Didsbury, until it reaches the motorway, and then heads south-east through Gatley and Cheadle, before it joins to the Handforth bypass at Cheadle Royal which was opened in 1995. The junction with the A560 road in Gatley is one of the busiest in Greater Manchester with over 7,000 vehicles passing through during the rush hour.

== Places of interest ==
- Parrs Wood Entertainment Centre in East Didsbury is on Kingsway.

== See also ==
- List of notable streets and roads in Manchester
