= Fallowfield =

Suburb of Manchester, England

Coordinates: 53.4425°N 2.2186°W

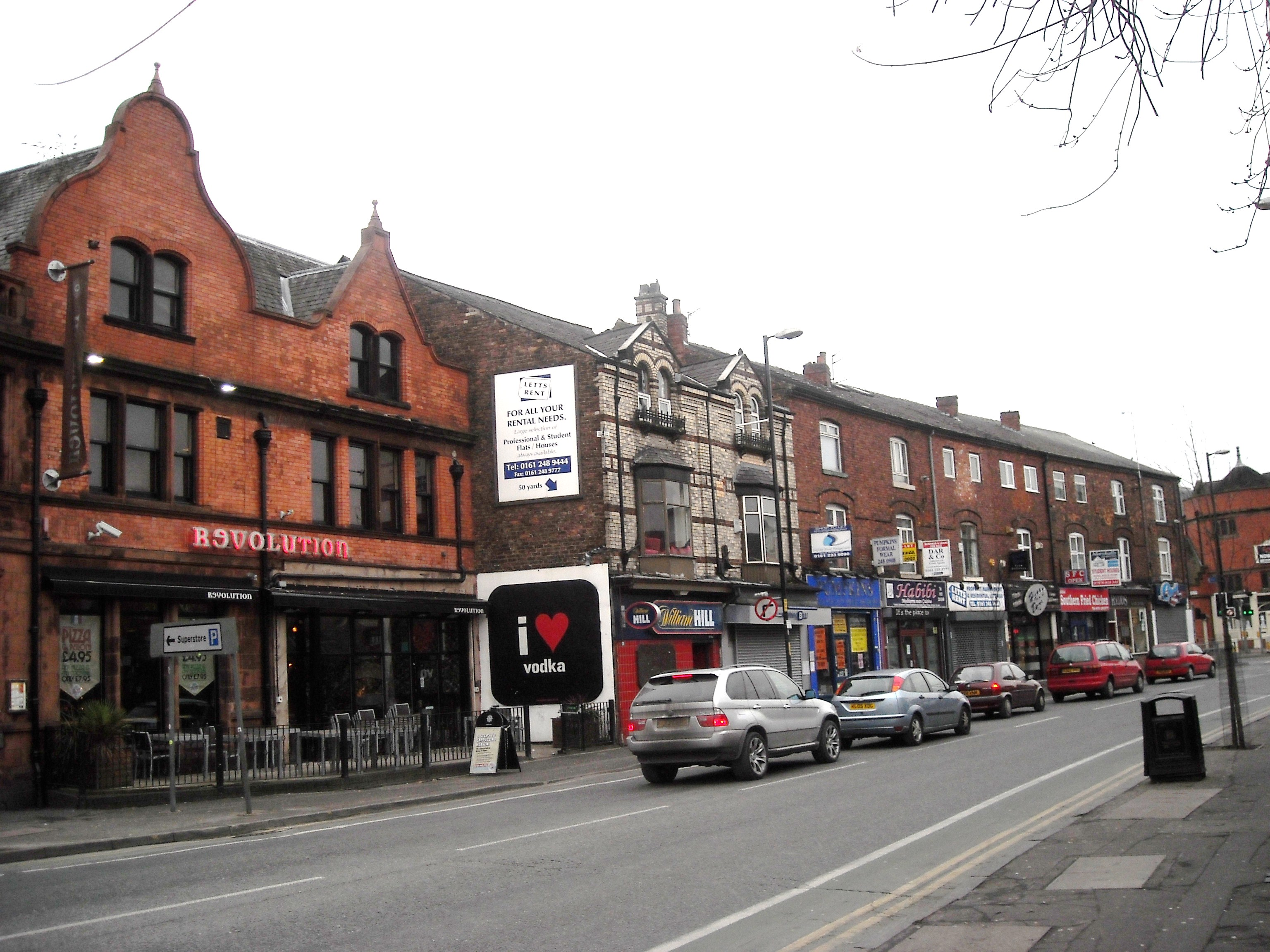
- Wilmslow Road, Fallowfield (part of the east side between Moseley Road and Egerton Road)

- Location within Greater Manchester
- Population: 15,211 (2011 census)
- OS grid reference: SJ855935
- Metropolitan borough: Manchester
- Metropolitan county: Greater Manchester
- Region: North West
- Country: England
- Sovereign state: United Kingdom
- Post town: MANCHESTER
- Postcode district: M14
- Dialling code: 0161
- Police: Greater Manchester
- Fire: Greater Manchester
- Ambulance: North West
- UK Parliament: Manchester Central; Manchester Rusholme; Manchester Withington
- Councillors: Sufyaan Jasat (Green); Jade Doswell (Labour); Ghazala Sadiq (Labour)

Fallowfield is an area of Manchester which had a population of 14,869 at the 2021 census. Historically in Lancashire, it lies 3 miles (5 km) south of Manchester city centre and is bisected east–west by Wilbraham Road and north–south by Wilmslow Road. The former Fallowfield Loop railway line, now a shared use path, follows a route nearly parallel with the east–west main road (Moseley Road/Wilbraham Road).

The area has a large student population. The University of Manchester's main accommodation complex – the Fallowfield Campus – occupies a large area in the north; this is adjacent to the university's Owens Park halls of residence and the Firs Botanical Grounds. In the northwest of the suburb is Platt Fields Park, which is formed from part of the land that once belonged to the Platts of Platt Hall.

== History ==
The early medieval linear earthwork Nico Ditch passes through Platt Fields Park in Fallowfield and dates from the 8th or 9th century.

Early Fallowfield was an ill-defined area north of Withington until the mid-19th century. The first mention of Fallowfield is in a deed of 1317 (as "Fallafeld"). During the 14th century at least part of the land in Fallowfield was held by Jordan de Fallafeld. In 1530 it was mentioned as "Falowfelde". Withington formed a sub-manor within the large Manor of Manchester. The Platt Estate in the north was first owned by the Platts and later by the Worsleys. The building of Wilbraham Road to connect Fallowfield with Edge Lane in Chorlton-cum-Hardy in 1869 enabled development west of the Wilmslow Road crossing. Some wealthy people (e.g. Joseph Whitworth, "The Firs", and the Behrens family, "The Oaks") built mansions in the area and in the early 20th century the university began to establish halls of residence (the earliest being Ashburne Hall, 1910, in a house donated by the family of Behrens) which have since become very extensive. There was a second period of building houses by members of the prosperous middle class in the 1850s: these included Egerton Lodge, Norton House and Oak House, while the Manchester architect Alfred Waterhouse built Barcombe Cottage as his own home on Oak Drive.

Under the Poor Law Fallowfield formed part of the Chorlton Poor Law Union (administered from Chorlton-on-Medlock). From 1876 to 1894 Fallowfield was included in the area of the Withington Local Board of Health which was replaced by the Withington Urban District Council in 1894. In 1895 Rusholme and the northern part of Fallowfield were incorporated into the city of Manchester. In 1904 the whole of the urban district was absorbed into the city of Manchester, though until 1914 there was a separate Withington Committee of the corporation and rates were lower than in the rest of the city.

In 1891 Fallowfield railway station on the Manchester, Sheffield and Lincolnshire Railway's line from Chorlton-cum-Hardy to Fairfield was opened. During the first half of the 20th century the Manchester Corporation tramway on Moseley and Wilbraham Roads provided access to other southern suburbs and via Princess Road to the city centre. In 1986 the UK's first drive-through McDonald's opened in Fallowfield. and more recently a Sainsbury's supermarket has been opened on the site of the railway station.

== Governance ==
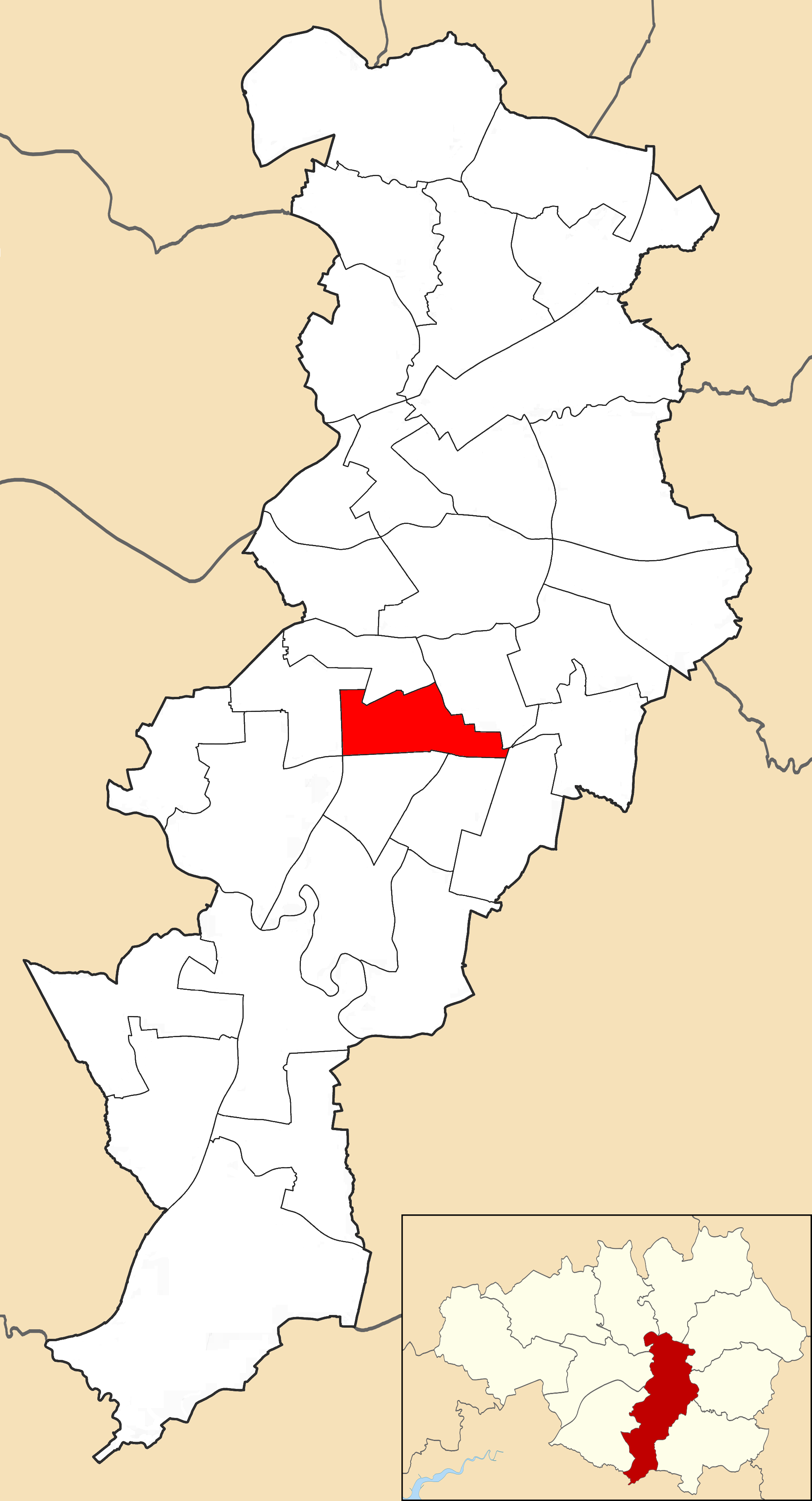
Fallowfield electoral ward within Manchester City Council.

Following boundary changes in 2018, different parts of the Fallowfield ward (which does not coincide with the area popularly known as Fallowfield) are parts of Manchester Gorton and Manchester Central parliamentary constituencies.

Councillors

Fallowfield ward is represented on Manchester City Council by three councillors: Jade Doswell (Lab), Ghazala Sadiq (Lab), and Sufyaan Jasat (Green).

Former Fallowfield Councillor Peter Morrison served as an Honorary Alderman for the city.

Election	Councillor	Councillor	Councillor
2018	Ali Ilyas (Lab)	Zahra Alijah (Lab)	Grace Fletcher-Hackwood (Lab)
2019	Jade Doswell (Lab)	Zahra Alijah (Lab)	Ali Ilyas (Lab)
2021	Jade Doswell (Lab)	Zahra Alijah (Lab)	Ali Ilyas (Lab)
2022	Jade Doswell (Lab)	Zahra Alijah (Lab)	Ali Ilyas (Lab)
2023	Jade Doswell (Lab)	Zahra Alijah (Lab)	Ali Ilyas (Lab)
2024	Jade Doswell (Lab)	Ghazala Sadiq (Lab)	Ali Ilyas (Lab)
2026	Jade Doswell (Lab)	Ghazala Sadiq (Lab)	Sufyaan Jasat (Grn)

indicates seat up for re-election. indicates seat won in by-election.

== Geography ==
Ladybarn is the part of Fallowfield to the south-east. Chancellors Hotel & Conference Centre is used by the University of Manchester: it was built by Edward Walters for Sir Joseph Whitworth, as were the Firs Botanical Grounds.

== Religion ==
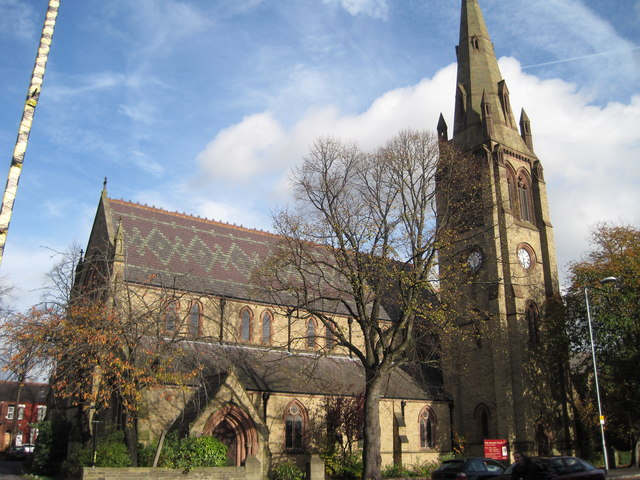
Holy Innocents Church

Holy Innocents Church (Anglican) stands on Wilbraham Road: the church was built in 1870–72 by the architects Price & Linklater using sandstone masonry. The style is Gothic revival and in 1983–84 the interior of the church was altered to designs by the Ellis Williams Partnership. The church was damaged by fire in 1954. The tower is at the south-east corner and is topped by an octagonal spire. The stained glass windows are mostly of the 1890s. After the closing of the nearby parish church of St James, Birch, in 1979 the two parishes were united under the name of the parish of Holy Innocents and St James. There is a student-friendly independent church meeting in the 256 bar next door (Ivy Fallowfield Church) and a Union Baptist Chapel not far away southwards. There is also a Seventh-day Adventist church in Wilbraham Road.

Wilbraham Road is also the site of the stylistically eclectic and, for its time, structurally innovative former South Manchester Synagogue (1913–2003). The building has now been converted to other uses.

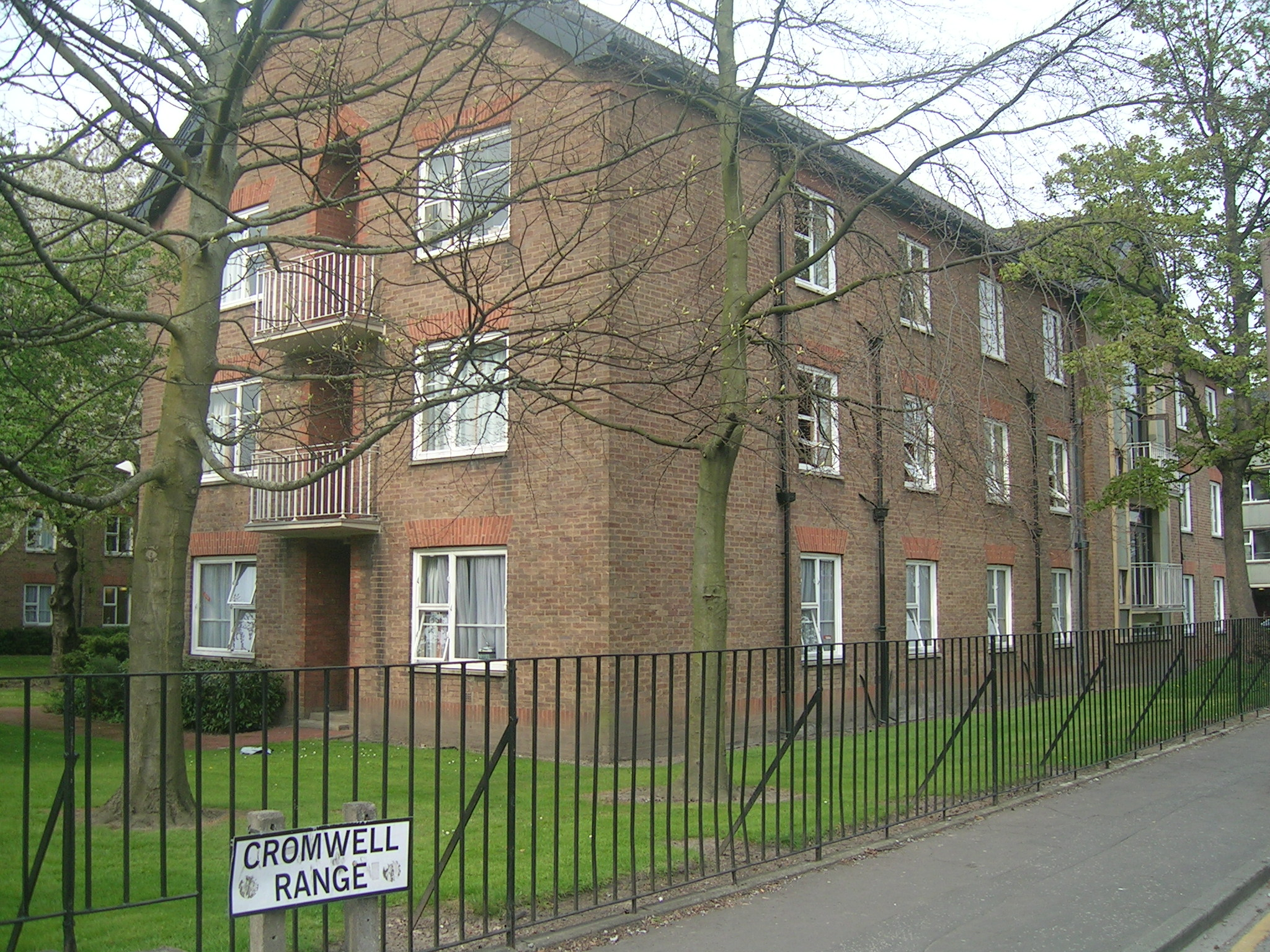
The More building of the Allen Hall Complex (a Roman Catholic hall of residence): see below, Education

Platt Chapel on Wilmslow Road south of Grangethorpe Road was a family chapel of the Worsleys of Platt Hall built in 1699. The present building is a rebuilding of 1790 modified in 1874–75. The congregation began as Independents (Congregationalists) and became Unitarian during the early 19th century. Since it ceased to be used for worship in 1970 it has been used by various local societies. The graveyard, which used to be larger, is surrounded by Platt Fields Park.

== Education ==
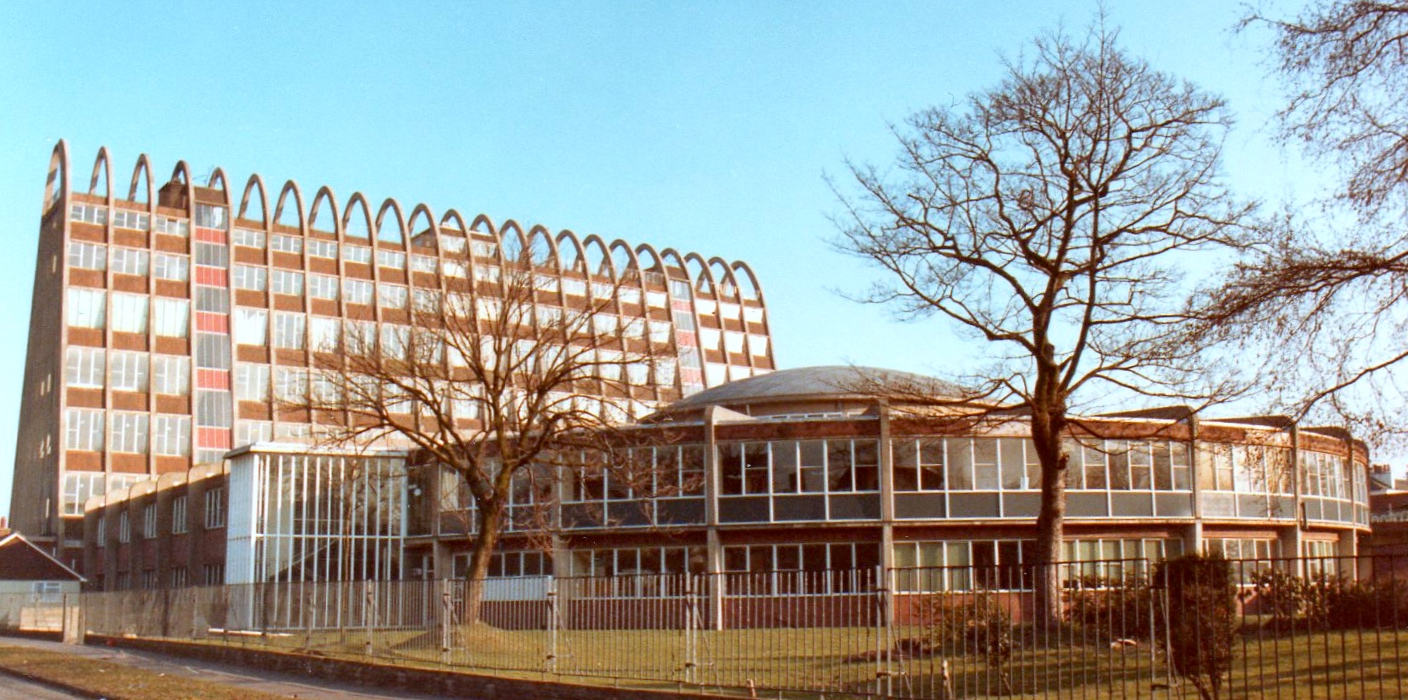
Fallowfield Campus, Manchester Metropolitan University in 1985 (the main building is known as the Toast Rack building)

Lady Barn House School, an independent primary school, was founded in Fallowfield in 1873 by William Henry Herford and took its name from the existing Ladybarn House which became its second home. In the 1950s, it moved to Cheadle.

Other schools and colleges in Fallowfield are:

- Holy Innocents Primary School (the former school buildings are next to the Holy Innocents Church and have been converted to other uses, they were built in 1882 to the designs of F. H. Oldham)
- Manchester Grammar School, a notable independent school which moved to Old Hall Lane from the city centre
- Moseley Road School (Levenshulme High School and Lower School)
- Princess Christian College (for the training of nannies) on Wilbraham Road
- Manchester High School for Girls on Grangethorpe Road
- Hollings College (also known as the Toast Rack building) campus of the Manchester Metropolitan University at the junction of Old Hall Lane with Wilmslow Road. Hollings campus was closed down in 2013 and then sold.

== Transport ==
The first flight into Fallowfield was made in 1912; the pilot was Mr Yoxall who flew the Avro 500 biplane from Trafford Park Aerodrome into a temporary air strip

=== Buses ===
Fallowfield has an excellent bus service along Wilmslow Road and other services connect it with Levenshulme, Chorlton-cum-Hardy and Manchester Airport. Services are operated by The Bee Network.

Local bus routes include:

- 25:The Trafford Centre - Stretford - Heaton Moor - Stockport
- CrossCity 41: Sale - Fallowfield - Hospitals - Manchester - Cheetham Hill - Middleton
- 42/42A/42B/42C: Manchester - Stockport (some services extending to Reddish, Woodford and Handforth Dean)
- 43: Manchester Airport - Wythenshawe - Manchester
- 142: East Didsbury – The Christie – Fallowfield – Manchester Royal Infirmary – Manchester
- 143: West Didsbury – Fallowfield – Rusholme – Manchester
- 150: The Trafford Centre - Trafford Park - Stretford - Gorton

=== Railway ===
The nearest National Rail station is Mauldeth Road, on the Styal Line. Services connect Manchester Airport and Manchester Piccadilly with other locations in the North-West, including Liverpool.

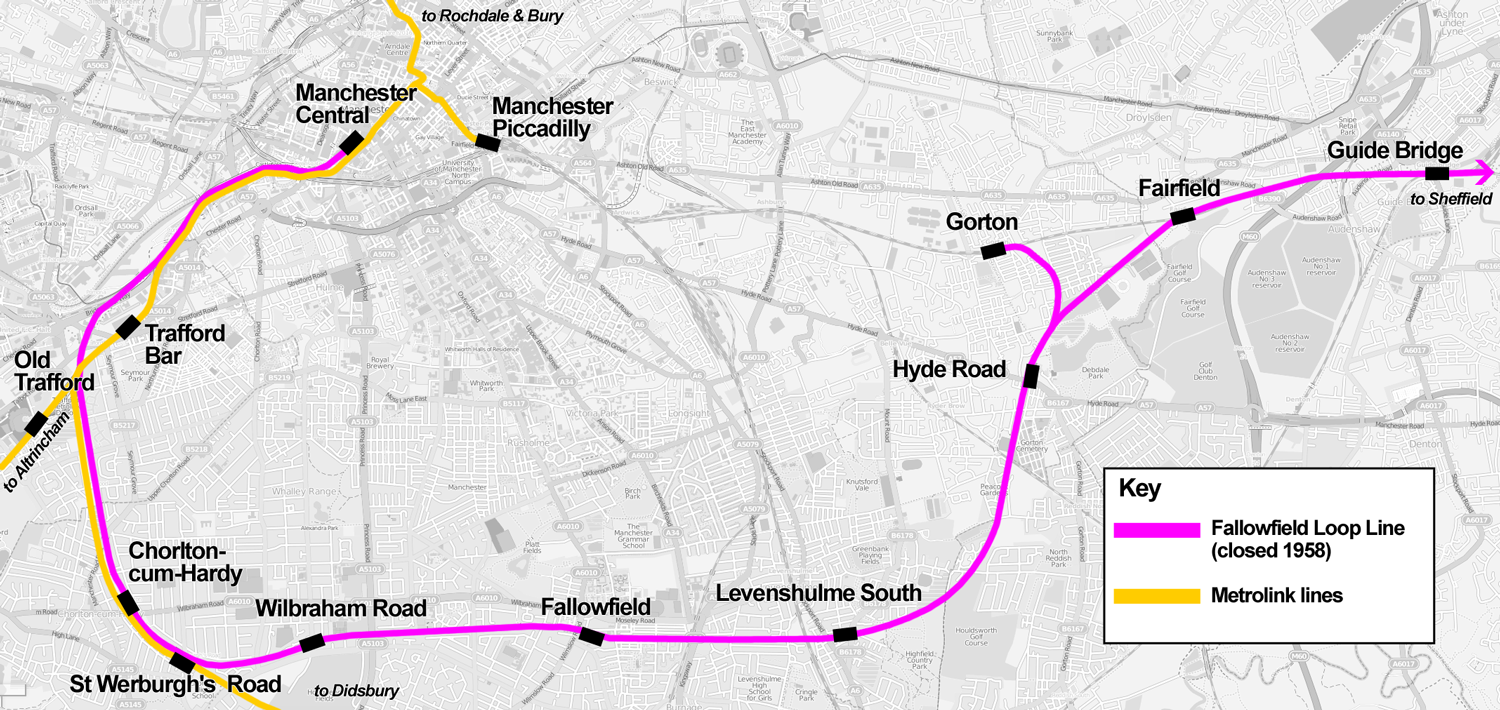
The former Fallowfield loop railway line

Until 1958, Fallowfield had its own railway station, located on Wilmslow Road, which provided trains between Manchester Central Station and Fairfield and Gorton. The site is now occupied by a Sainsbury's supermarket and a block of flats; the station building itself serving as a Starbucks cafe. The railway line continued as a freight line until it was closed in 1988. After years of the line lying derelict, the old trackbed was repurposed around 2001 as a shared use path and, today, the Fallowfield Loop route runs from Fairfield station to St Werburgh's Road Metrolink station. The route is run by Sustrans and forms part of Routes 6 and 60 of the National Cycle Network.

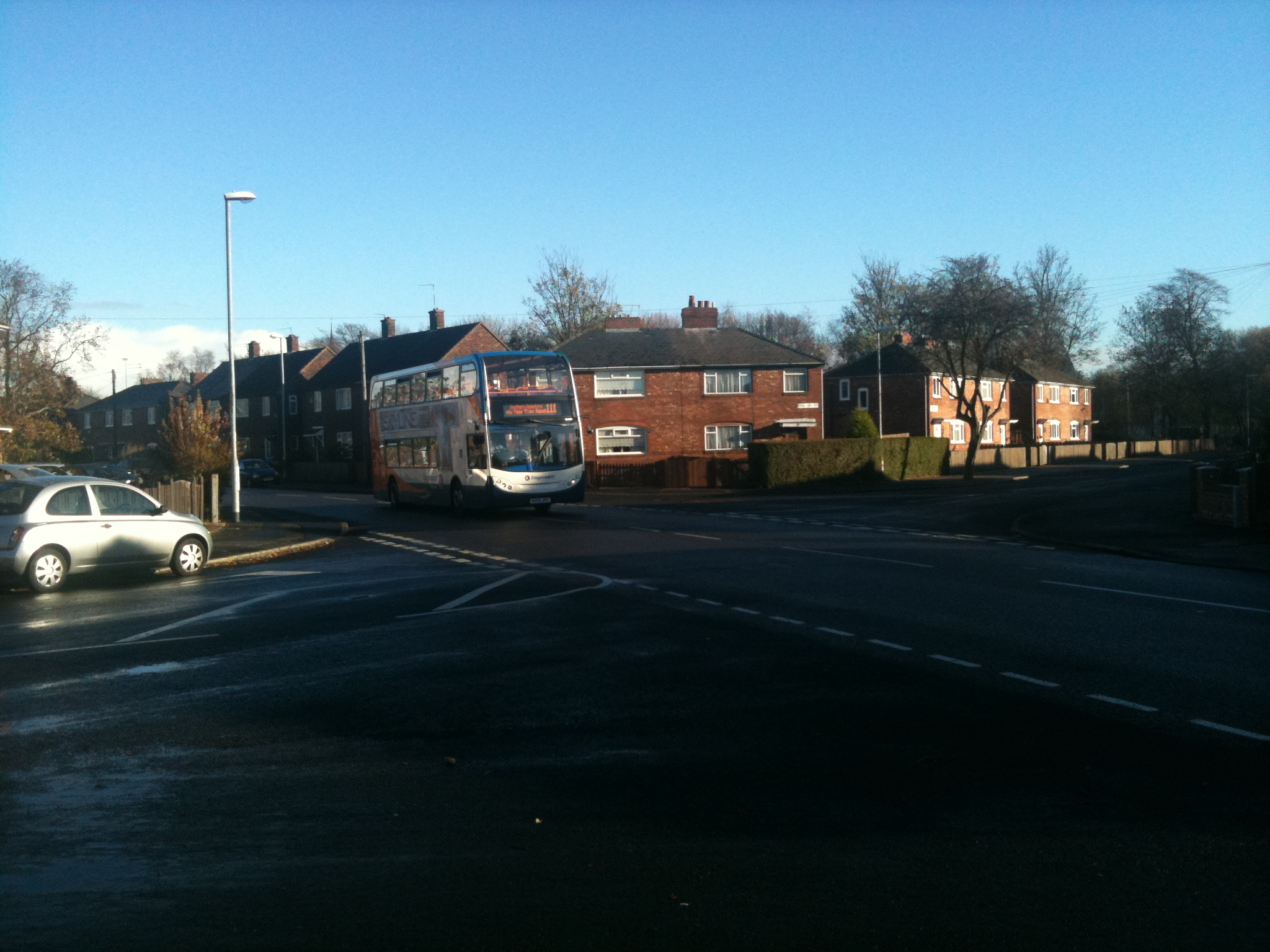
Yew Tree Road, Fallowfield

== Sport ==
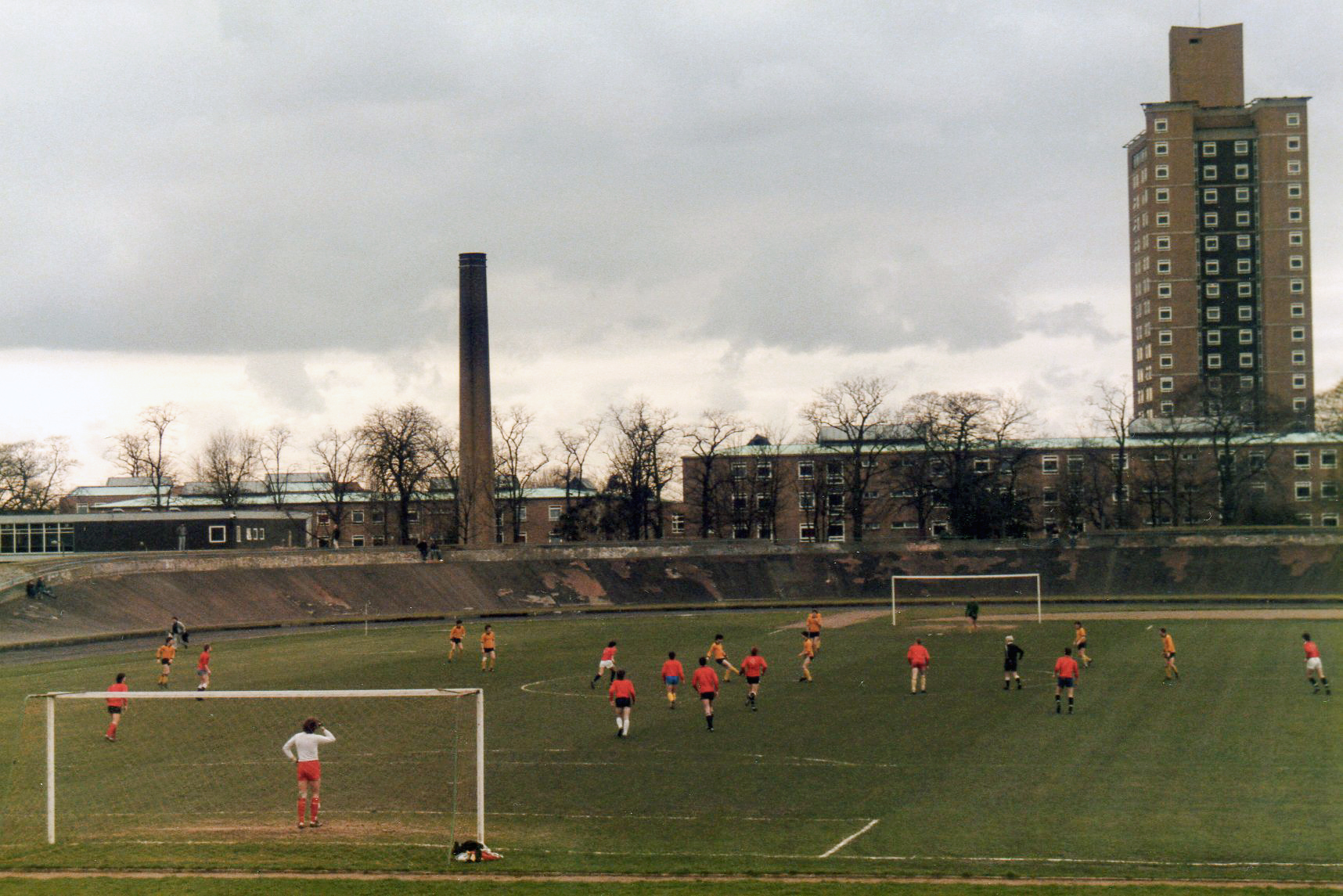
Manchester students kicking off a match at Fallowfield Stadium in 1985

The 1893 FA Cup Final was played at Fallowfield Stadium, in which Wolverhampton Wanderers beat Everton 1–0, with Harry Allen scoring the only goal of the game. The stadium also hosted the cycling events for the 1934 British Empire Games, the Amateur Athletic Association championships in 1897 and 1907 and two Northern Rugby Football Union (later Rugby Football League) Challenge Cup finals in 1899 and 1900. It was demolished in 1994, and the site is now Manchester University's Richmond Park Halls of Residence.

== Musical associations ==
A TV broadcast called the Gospel and Blues Train featuring Muddy Waters, Sister Rosetta Tharpe, Sonny Terry and Brownie McGhee and other blues singers was recorded by Granada TV at Wilbraham Road railway station on Thursday, 7 May 1964, after the station was closed to passenger traffic.

Fallowfield was the subject of the penultimate track on Manchester band the Courteeners debut album, St Jude, entitled "Fallowfield Hillbilly". The Chemical Brothers met at the University of Manchester and played their first gig at 'The Bop', a popular student night that was located within the University of Manchester's Owens Park halls of residence.

Garage vocal group Platnum who had hit singles "What’s It Gonna Be" and "Love Shy" reaching number 2 in the UK charts with the former. Platnum members Aaron Evers and Michelle Mckenna's families still reside in the suburb.

== Notable residents ==
- John Cassidy, sculptor, art lecturer.
- Sir Edward Donner, entrepreneur and philanthropist
- Anthony "White Tony" Johnson, criminal, one-time head of the Cheetham Hill Gang.
- Sir John Alcock, who with Lieut. Sir Arthur Whitten Brown made the first non-stop aeroplane crossing of the Atlantic, lived on Kingswood Road.
- Dr Thomas Arthur Helme served as a GP in the area
- Alexander Maclaren, minister of the Union Chapel
- Pat Phoenix, famous for her role as Elsie Tanner in Coronation Street, was born in Fallowfield in 1923
- Shaun Ryder, musician and television personality, best known as a member of the Happy Mondays and Black Grape, lived in Fallowfield during the late 1980s
- C. P. Scott, editor of the Manchester Guardian lived at The Firs
- John Stopford, Baron Stopford of Fallowfield, anatomist and academic, Vice-Chancellor of the Victoria University of Manchester
- Thomas Tout, medieval historian, Professor of History, Victoria University of Manchester
- Frank Whitcombe, Welsh Rugby League Lance Todd Trophy winner, signed for Broughton Rangers and lived in Withington
- Sir Joseph Whitworth, engineer, lived at The Firs
- Neil Young, Manchester City footballer, born in Fallowfield in 1944
- Jackie Lane, Dr Who actor, antiques dealer and Voiceover Agent, born in Fallowfield in 1941
- Jack Whitehall, Comedian, lived in Fallowfield off Egerton Road for two years
- Rik Mayall, Comedian, actor and writer who lived in Owens Park in 1975.
- Ed O'Brien, musician best known for being the guitarist in the band Radiohead lived in Fallowfield whilst at university.
- Dennis Viollet, professional footballer for Manchester United and the England national team and survivor of the Munich air disaster was born in Fallowfield in 1933.
- Mike Joyce, musician best known for being the drummer in the band The Smiths.
- Luke Matheson, professional footballer was born in Fallowfield.
- Fisayo Akinade, Actor.
- Florence Nagle, racehorse trainer and breeder.
- Kesha Wizzart, singer.
- Tony Michaelides, music industry executive.
- Eleanor Calder model, and former girlfriend of Louis Tomlinson.

== See also ==
- Listed buildings in Manchester-M14
