= Toast rack =

Tableware for serving toast

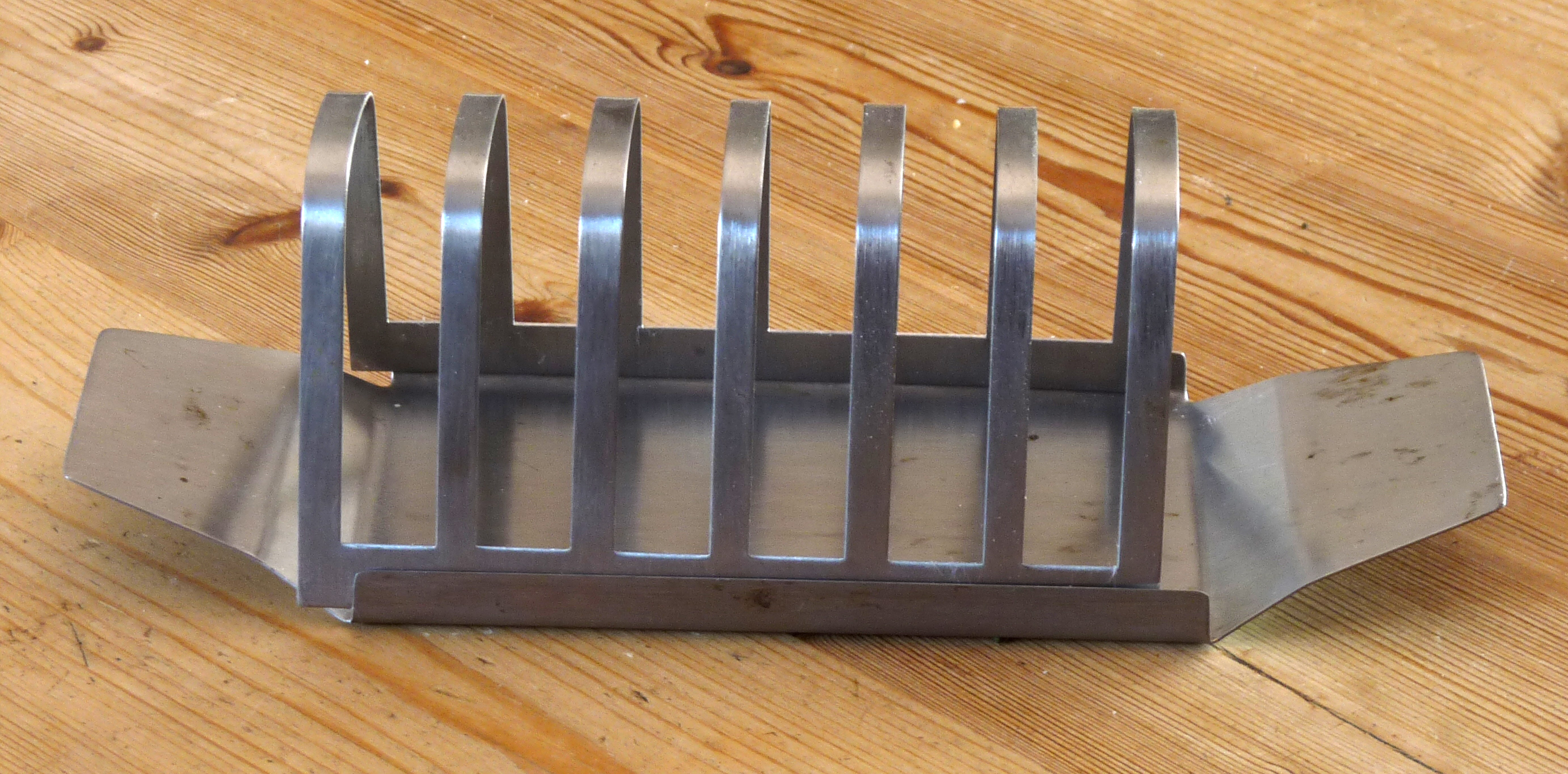
A plain metal toast rack

A toast rack is a serving piece with several vertical partitions connected to a flat base, used for holding slices of toast.

The term toast rack is also used in other fields, notably railways and architectural design, to describe objects resembling a toast rack.

== History and design ==
Toast racks date back to the late 18th century in Great Britain. By maintaining air gaps between the slices, the toast rack allows water vapor to escape from hot toast instead of condensing into adjacent slices and making them soggy. However, this increased air flow can also mean that the toast becomes cold more quickly.

The toast rack's design and shape follows prevailing fashion. They often have a central ring handle for carrying and passing round the table. The dividers were often made from silver wires and these in turn were soldered to either a wire-work or a solid base that sat on four feet. Sometimes the base is separate and was used to dispose of any crumbs that fell. Some ingenious designs were made including expanding or folding types (so as to take up less space). Others had incorporated egg-cups or receptacles for jam or marmalade.

A designer noted for his innovative take on the toast rack was Christopher Dresser (1834–1904), who studied at the Glasgow Government School of Design and contributed to the development of modern design.

Newer designs are often made from stamped and folded stainless steel sheet or from welded stainless wire.

== Derivative names ==
=== Architecture ===
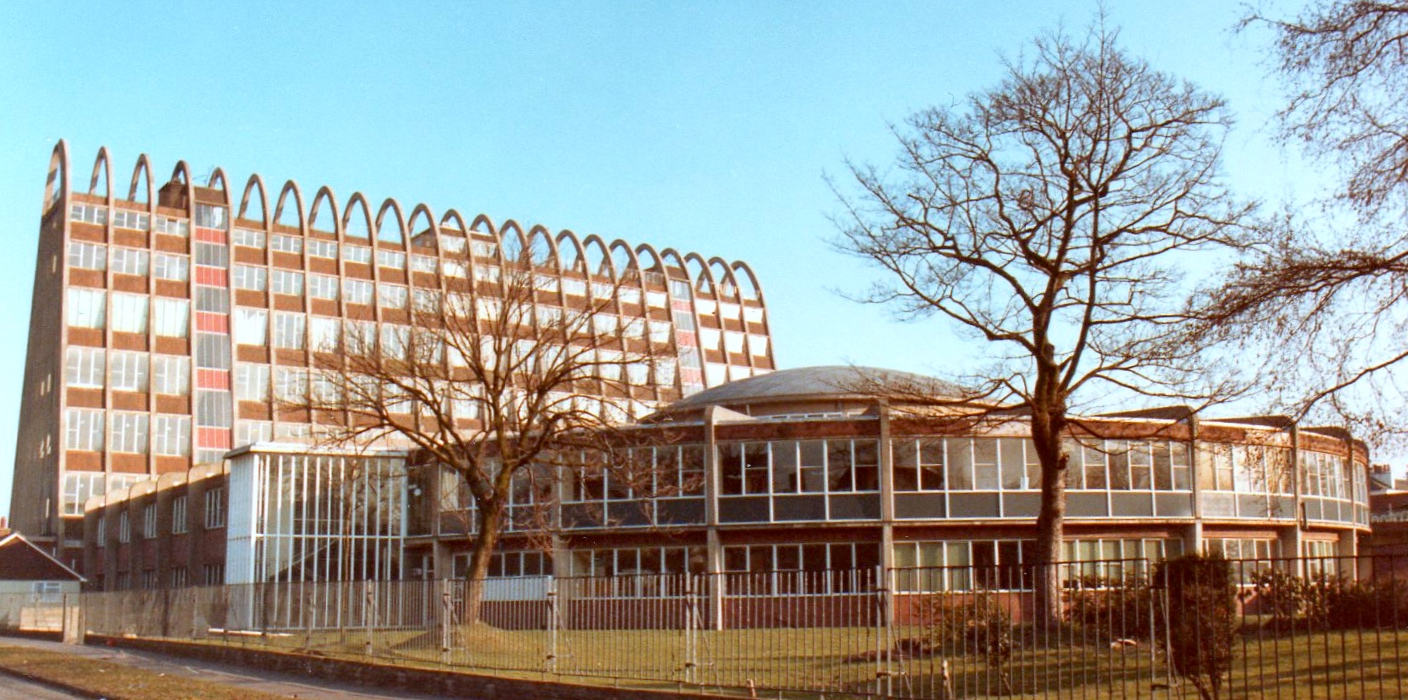
The Toast Rack (rear) and Fried Egg (foreground) buildings, Fallowfield Campus, Manchester Metropolitan University, in 1985

Manchester Metropolitan University's Fallowfield Campus main building, the Hollings Building designed by architect L. C. Howitt, is often referred to as "The Toast Rack", due to its unusual architectural design. The appearance is compounded by the fact that the building was constructed to house a department of domestic science. A neighbouring building, by the same architect, is said to resemble a fried egg. The building was Grade II listed in 1998 and was described by the prolific architectural critic, Nikolaus Pevsner as "a perfect piece of pop architecture".

An affluent block of streets in Wandsworth, South West London (SW18), is commonly referred to as "The Toast Rack" by local estate agents and residents, owing to its appearance on street plans which seem to resemble the shape of a toast rack.

=== Railway and tramway carriages ===
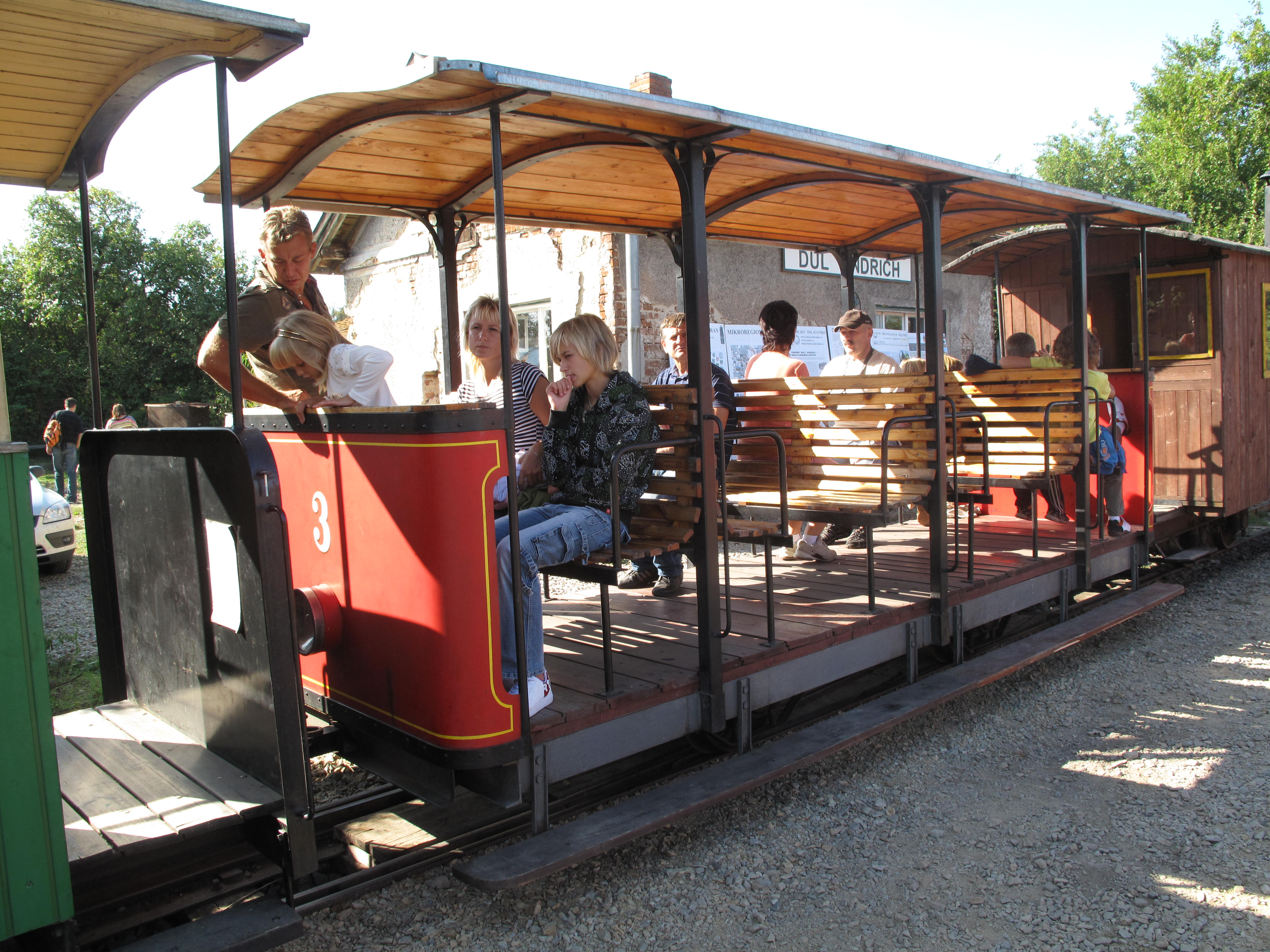
Czech narrow-gauge railway toast rack coach at Zbýšov, with open sides but a roof

The 'toast rack passenger carriage' has been a design feature of railways since their inception, with the name particularly common on miniature and light railways, where it refers to open-sided carriages (with or, especially on miniature railways, without roofs) where the essential design is a flat frame with a series of upright seats set at right-angles to the direction of the track, thus forming a crude representation of a toast rack. When the term 'toast rack carriage' is used of larger railways (up to, and sometimes including, standard gauge) it refers to coaches whose seats are set at right-angles to the track direction, and with no side corridor, central aisle, or corridor connection; thus each compartment is fully separated from the next by upright seats, again resembling the toast rack design. At these larger gauges the coaches may be fully enclosed, or 'semi-open' (with roofs and sides, but unglazed windows). Many railways have examples of toast rack carriages, and some (for example the Vale of Rheidol Railway in Wales) are known for a distinct preference for the design in their rolling stock fleet.

On tramways of the horse and early electric age, toastrack cars – usually with roofs and often reversible seats – were common in warm climates or for summer use. On electric tramways, such cars were usually trailers, but motor toastracks did occur.
