= University of Liverpool School of Architecture =

Architecture school in England

Liverpool School of Architecture
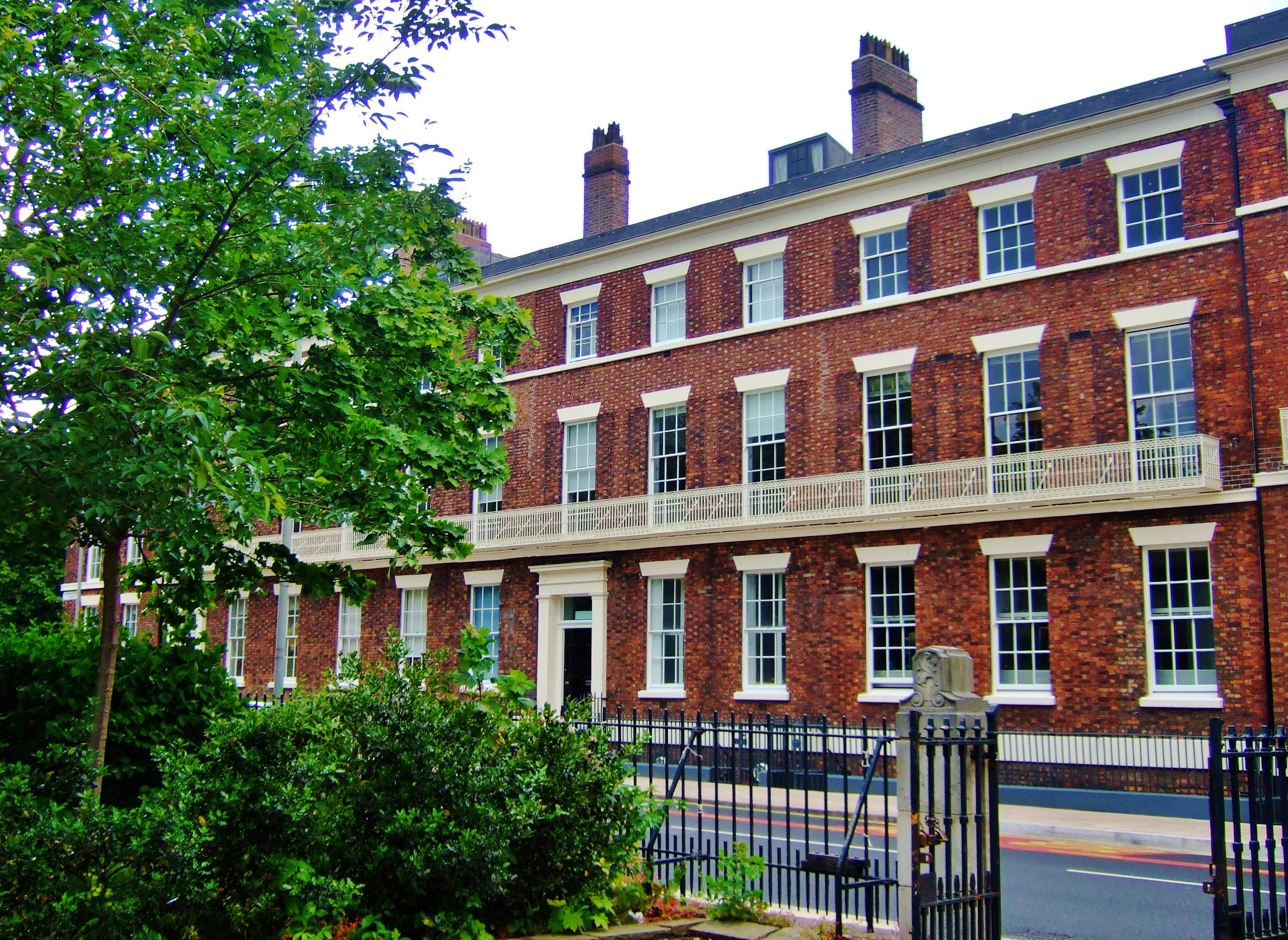
- Abercromby Square
- Type: Architecture school
- Location: Liverpool, UK
- Website: www.liverpool.ac.uk/architecture/

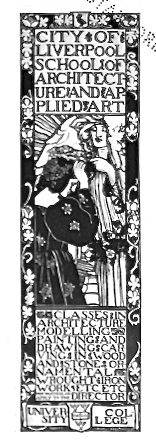
City of Liverpool School of Architecture and Applied Art – University College

The Liverpool School of Architecture is the architecture school of the University of Liverpool in Liverpool, England. It was the first architecture school in the United Kingdom to be affiliated with a university, and the first to have degree programmes validated by the Royal Institute of British Architects (RIBA), in 1895.

Six RIBA Gold Medallists have been staff or graduates of Liverpool. The School was initially an important centre for the Arts and Crafts movement, but later promoted Classical and Modernist ideas under the influence of Charles Herbert Reilly.

== Notable alumni and academic staff ==
- Robert Anning Bell
- Patrick Abercrombie
- Lionel Bailey Budden
- Dariush Borbor, Iranian architect, urban planner, civic designer, writer
- Maxwell Fry
- George Noel Hill
- William Holford, Baron Holford
- Leonard Cecil Howitt
- Quentin Hughes
- Augustus John
- Stirrat Johnson-Marshall
- Thomas Alwyn Lloyd
- Charles Herbert Reilly
- Colin Rowe
- Herbert James Rowse
- Giles Gilbert Scott
- James Stirling
- F. X. Velarde
- Ernst Wiesner

== See also ==
- University of Liverpool School of Medicine
- University of Liverpool School of Veterinary Science
- Liverpool Knowledge Quarter
- Xi'an Jiaotong-Liverpool University Architecture Department
