= Manchester Crown Court (Crown Square) =

Court building in Manchester, England

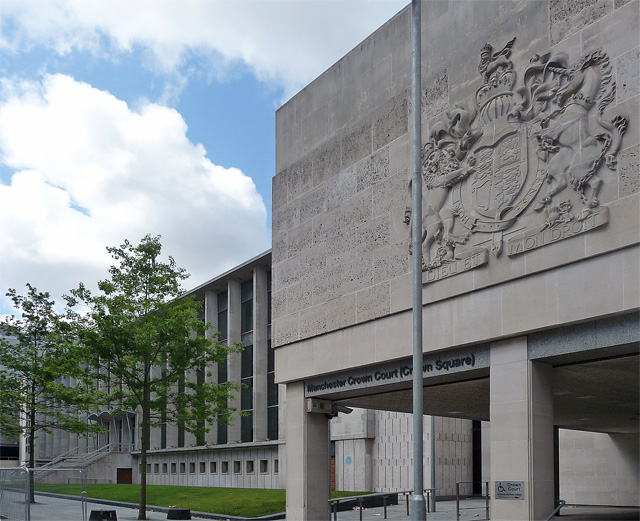
- Manchester Crown Court (Crown Square)

- Location within Greater Manchester
- 53.4806°N 2.2519°W
- Location: Crown Square, Manchester

History
- Built: 1988

Site notes
- Architect: Leonard Cecil Howitt
- Architectural style: Modernist style

Manchester Crown Court (Crown Square) is a Crown Court venue which deals with criminal cases at Crown Square in Manchester, England. It is one of two Crown Courts in Manchester, the other being Minshull Street Crown Court.

== History ==
Until the 1940s, criminal court cases were heard at the Manchester Assize Courts. However, the assize courts were badly damaged in the Manchester Blitz in 1940. After the war, the Lord Chancellor's Department decided to commission a new building to replace the assize courts. The site selected by the Lord Chancellor's Department, in Spinningfields, had been occupied by workshops and factories which had also been badly damaged during the war.

The new building was designed by the city architect, Leonard Cecil Howitt, in the Modernist style, built in Portland stone and was completed in 1962. The design involved a symmetrical main frontage of nineteen bays facing onto a newly created open area known as Crown Square. The central section of three bays featured a long flight of steps leading up to a three-door entrance with an ornate canopy supported by poles and surmounted by golden eagles. The bays in the central section and the seven bays which flanked the central section on either side were fenestrated by full-height glazing separated by stone piers, while the end bays were fenestrated by matrices of small square windows. Some of the sculptures from the assize courts were preserved and incorporated into the building. It was extended to the north to a design by the Property Services Agency in the brutalist style in 1986. Internally, the complex was laid out to accommodate 17 courts. The architectural historian, Nikolaus Pevsner, commented that the complex was a "come-down after Waterhouse's brilliant early work" at the assize courts.

As the volume of cases increased in the early 1990s, the department decided to re-open the Minshull Street building to support the work of the Crown Square building. A "super-courtroom", intended for gang trials and murder cases, with floor-area three times the size of a standard courtroom, was brought into use in September 2021.

Notable cases at Crown Square have included the trial and conviction, in July 2009, of three men for the murder of the local hard man, Donald Donlan, the trial and conviction, in March 2021, of three men for the murder of the boxer, Cole Kershaw, and the trial and conviction, in August 2023, of the nurse, Lucy Letby, for the murder of seven babies and the attempted murder of six others.

== Extrernal links ==
- Court information
