= John Alexander Brodie =

English civil engineer

- Brodie c. May 1906
- Born: 1 June 1858; Bridgnorth, England
- Died: 16 November 1934 (aged 76); Liverpool, England
- Resting place: Anfield Cemetery, Liverpool
- Education: Owen's College, Manchester
- Spouse: Aimée Freeland
- Engineering career
- Discipline: Civil
- Institutions: Institution of Civil Engineers (president)
- Projects: Mersey Tunnel; East Lancashire Road

John Alexander Brodie (1858 – 1934) was an English civil engineer. He was especially known for his contribution to town planning in Liverpool, notably as one of the engineers who led the design of the Mersey Tunnel under the River Mersey. He is also known for inventing the netting for football goals in 1889.

== Early life ==
John Alexander Brodie was born in Bridgnorth on 1 June 1858. His father, James Brodie, was a Scottish man from Kettins. Brodie served his apprenticeship in 1875, working in the Mersey Docks and Harbour Board engineering department under Chief Engineer George Fosbery Lyster. In 1879 he obtained a Whitworth Scholarship and a Canning Scholarship to study mathematics at Owen's College (now part of the University of Manchester). After graduation, he served a three-year traineeship in the office of Sir Joseph Whitworth.

== Civil engineering career ==
After a short spell working for the Liverpool City Engineer's Department, he set up a private consultancy and spent some time working in Bilbao, Spain. He returned to Britain in 1884.

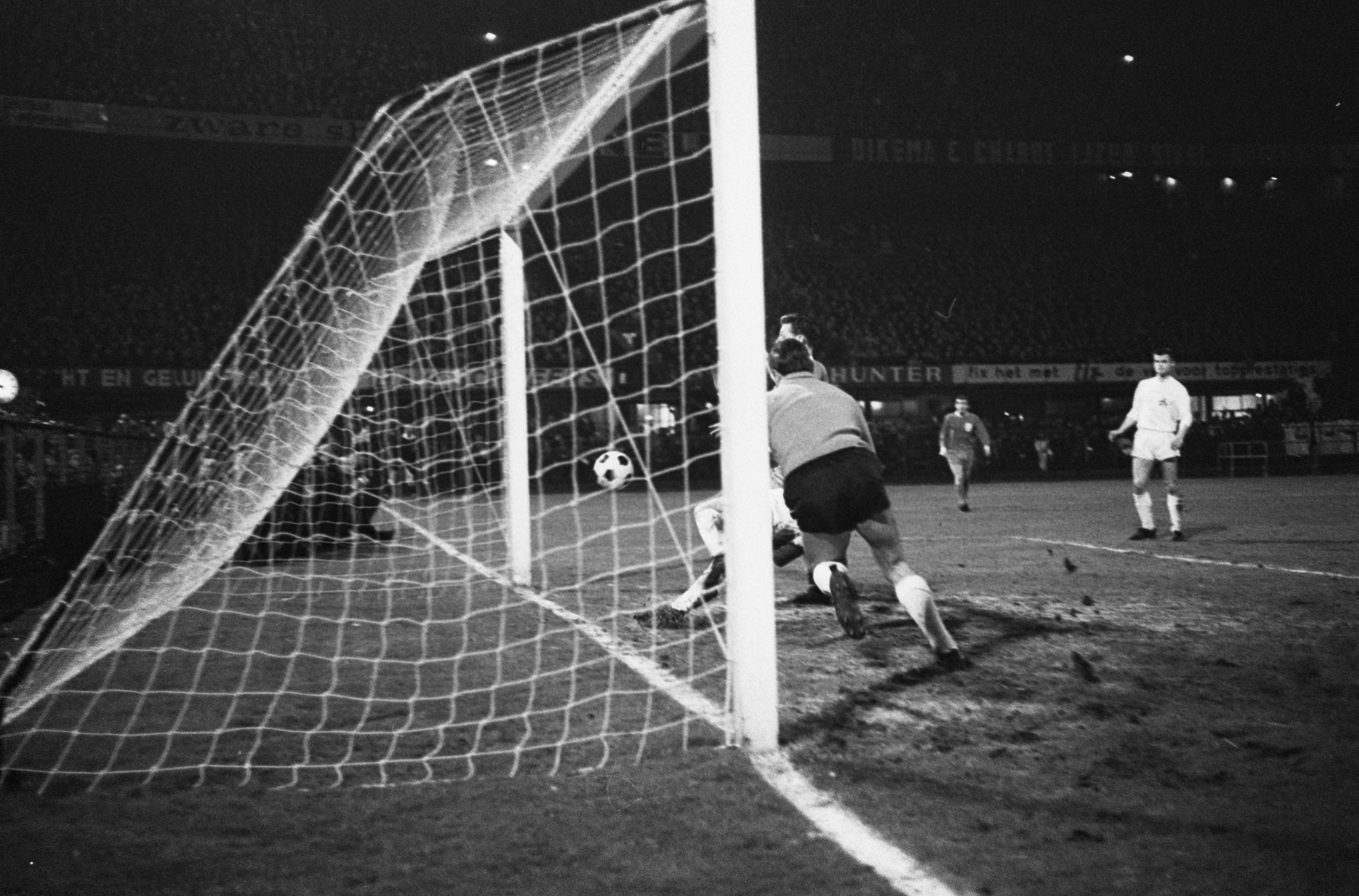
Brodie is credited with inventing the football goal net

Brodie was a keen sportsman and played rugby and golf. In 1889 he invented the goal net for use in football matches, and he said that this was the invention of which he was the most proud.

Brodie returned to Liverpool in 1898 as the city engineer suggesting several improvements for the town such as the UK's first ring road, electric trams and the East Lancashire Road, the UK's first intercity highway.

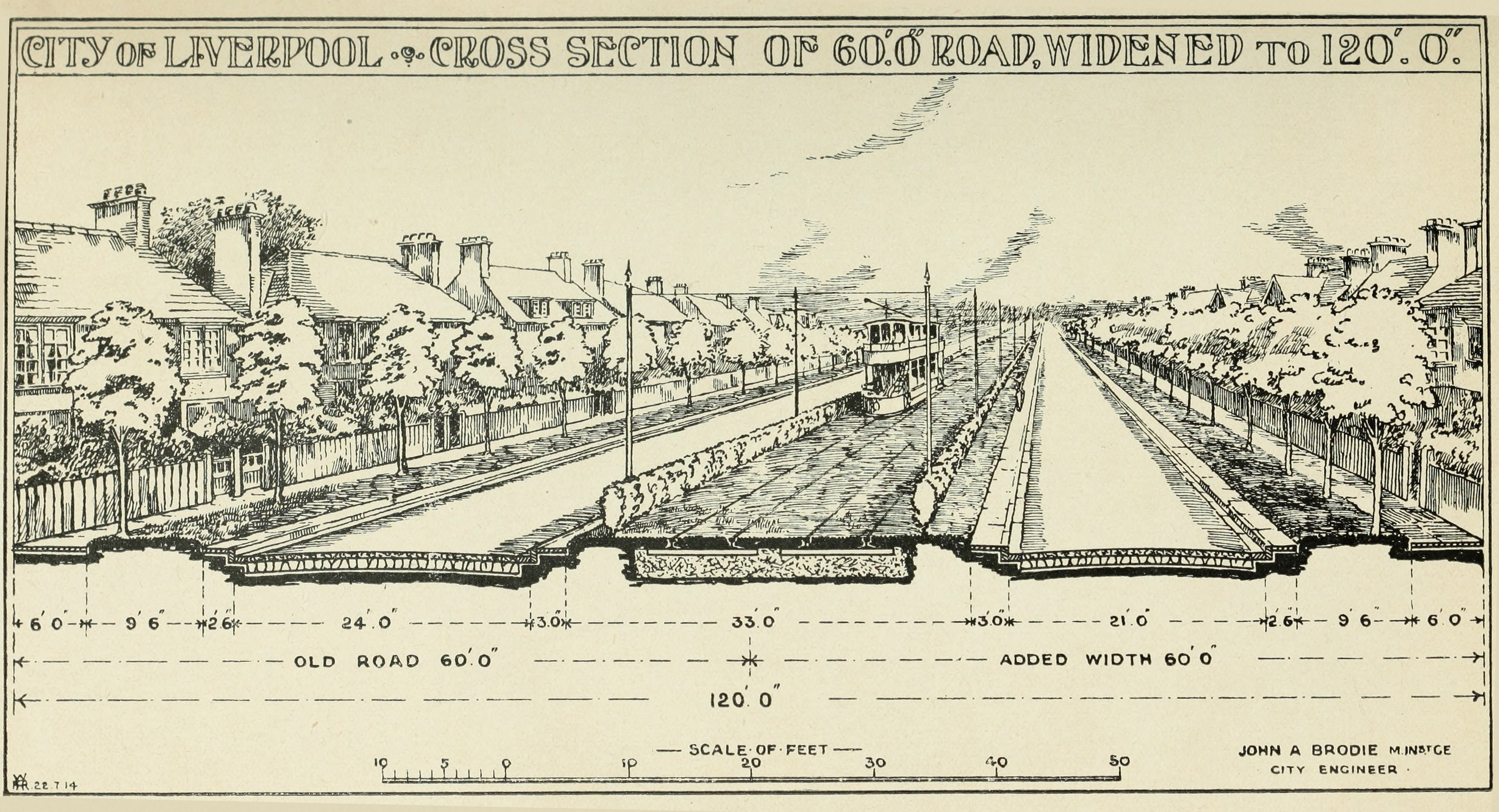
Cross-section illustration of Brodie's proposals for a dual carriageway with a central segregated tram track in Liverpool (1914)

He pioneered a new system of road layout, in which conventional road traffic would run along a dual carriageway with the central reservation being used for a segregated reserved track for trams. This layout formed the basis of Brodie's wide new boulevards such as Queens Drive and adjoining radial roads such as Menlove Avenue. This technique was later used in road building projects in Manchester, for Kingsway and Princess Road.

Brodie was at the forefront of pre-fabricated housing technology, promoting the use of pre-cast reinforced concrete slabs as a means of building houses quickly and cheaply; he presented an example of this technique to the Cheap Cottages Exhibition at Letchworth Garden City. The design attracted attention from across the world and he is known to have influenced Grosvenor Atterbury who used a similar technique to build the houses at Forest Hills Gardens.

Brodie was also interested in town planning and this was recognised in 1912 when he was asked to help select the site of and plan New Delhi. He visited India twice for this purpose and in 1931 was invited to the official opening ceremony by the viceroy owing to the high regard that Edwin Lutyens, the chief planner had for him.

Brodie served as president of the Institution of Civil Engineers between 1920 and 1921, becoming the first local authority engineer to receive the accolade. He was also an associate professor of engineering at Liverpool University and vice-president of the Liverpool Self-Propelled Traffic Association which would later become a constituent of the Royal Automobile Club.

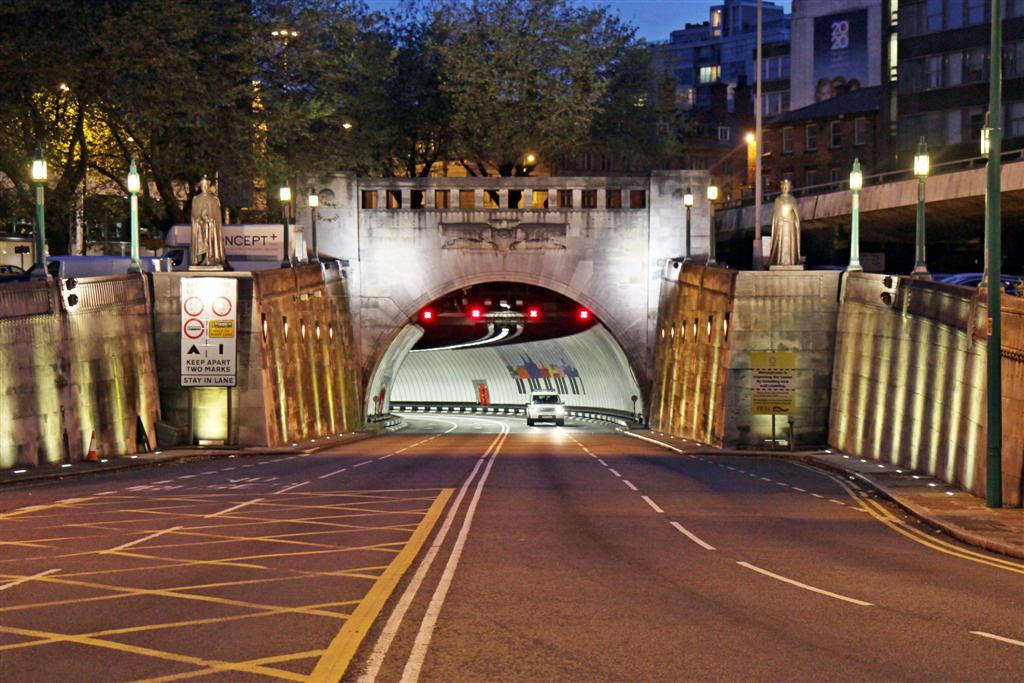
Brodie designed the Queensway Road Tunnel under the River Mersey (opened 1934)

Brodie's greatest engineering achievement was the Mersey Tunnel. Brodie worked on this project jointly with engineer Sir Basil Mott and the tunnel was completed in 1934 following nine years in the making. Running from Liverpool city centre under the River Mersey to emerge in Birkenhead, the tunnel was originally conceived with a tramway for Liverpool Corporation Tramways which would run along a lower section beneath the roadway, but this plan was later abandoned. At the time of its construction it was the world's longest underwater road tunnel, a title it held for 24 years, and remains to this day the UK's largest municipal engineering project.

== Personal life ==
Brodie married Aimée Freeland, the daughter of Hugh Freeland from Uddingston, in 1897 in Glasgow. They had two sons and two daughters.

== Death and legacy ==
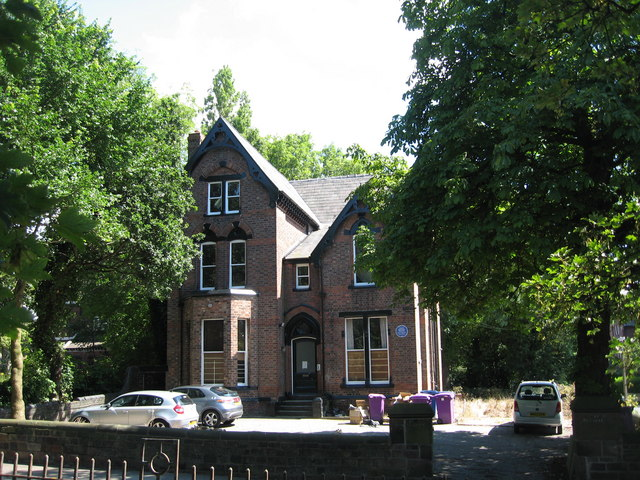
Brodie's house on Ullet Road near Sefton Park

On 16 November 1934, Brodie died at Aigburth Hall in Liverpool's Aigburth suburb at the age of 76.

After Brodie's death, Liverpool City Council named Brodie Avenue in his honour. His former Liverpool home where he lived from 1858 to 1934, 28 Ullet Road near Sefton Park, is commemorated with an English Heritage blue plaque. There is also a Stonegate pub called The John Brodie on Allerton Road in the Mossley Hill suburb.

Professional and academic associations
Preceded by John Griffith	President of the Institution of Civil Engineers; November 1920 – November 1921	Succeeded by William Barton Worthington
