= Minshull Street Crown Court =

Crown Court in Manchester, England

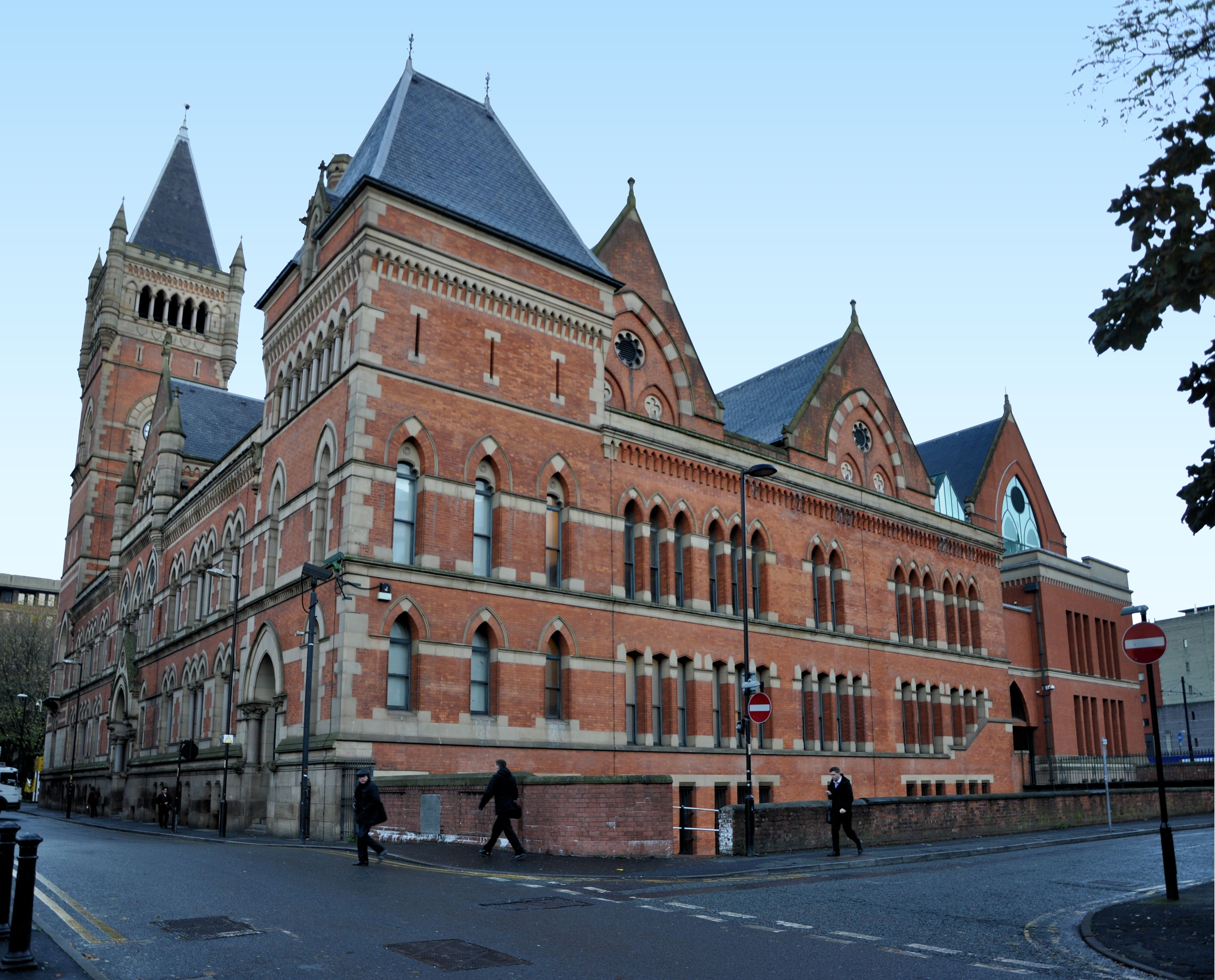
- Minshull Street Crown Court

- Location within Greater Manchester

General information
- Architectural style: Gothic Revival
- Location: Manchester, England
- Coordinates: 53.4786°N 2.2349°W
- Year built: 1868–71
- Owner: Ministry of Justice

Design and construction
- Architect: Thomas Worthington
- Designations

Listed Building – Grade II*
- Official name: City Police Courts
- Designated: 3 October 1974
- Reference no.: 1219894

Minshull Street Crown Court is a complex of court buildings on Minshull Street in Manchester, England. The court was designated a Grade II* listed building on 3 October 1974. It is one of two Crown Courts in Manchester, the other being Manchester Crown Court.

== History ==
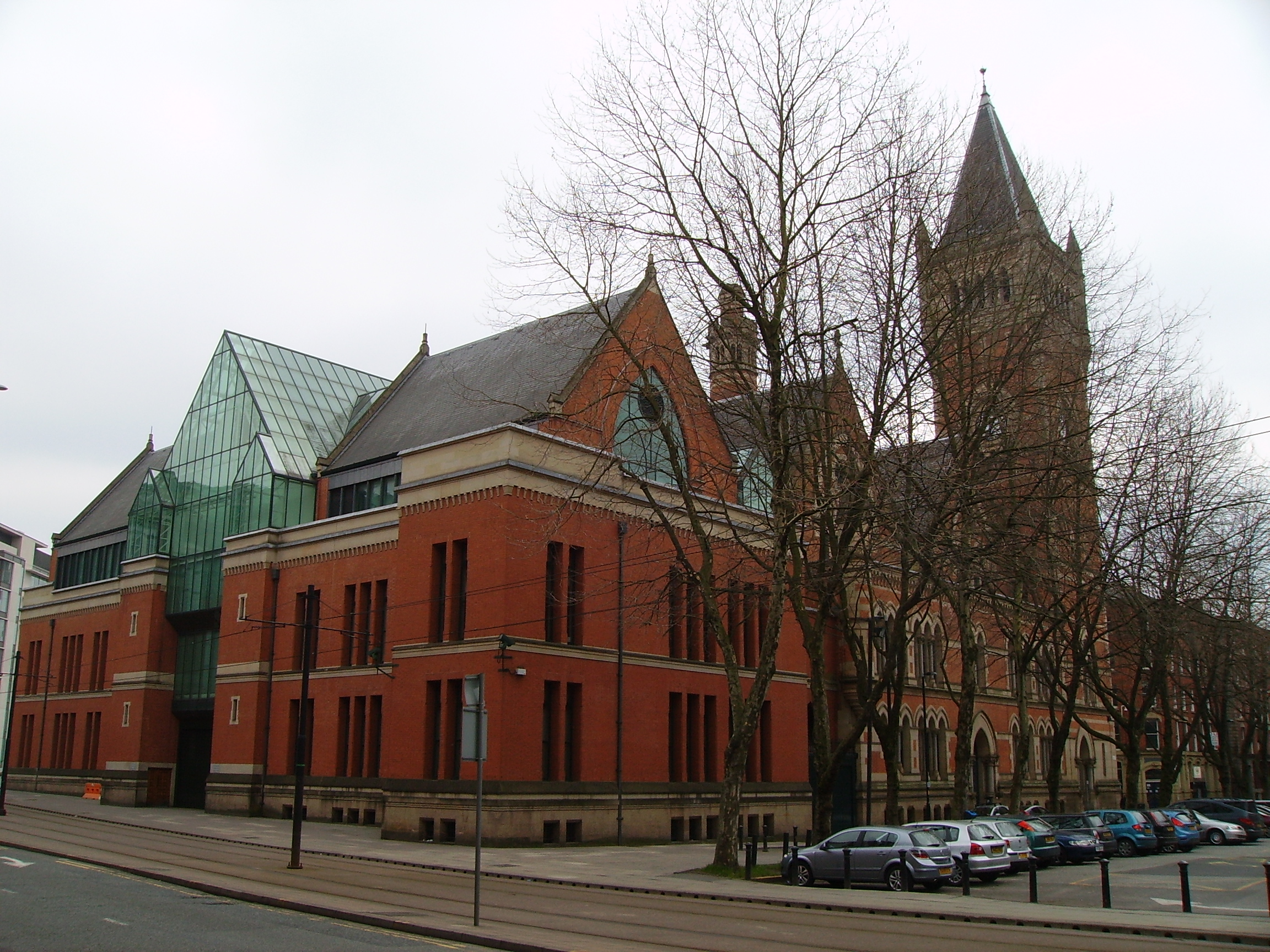
Police Courts showing the 1990s extension

The foundation stone for the building was laid by the mayor on 10 July 1868. The building was designed by the architect Thomas Worthington and was completed in December 1871.

The building is in Worthington's trademark Gothic Revival style, with a massive corner tower and a chimney stack styled as a campanile. The courts are constructed in red brick with sandstone dressings and steeply pitched slate roofs. There is a profusion of animal carving by Earp and Hobbs. Worthington drew both on his rejected designs for Manchester Town Hall, and on his earlier plans for Ellen Wilkinson High School, although the central tower he used there is placed asymmetrically at the Police Courts, due to the constraints of the site. The interior court rooms "have been preserved with relatively few alterations."

Following the completion of new Courts of Justice in Crown Square in May 1961, the Lord Chancellor's Department decided to close the Minshull Street building in 1989, but as the volume of cases increased in the early 1990s, the department decided to re-open the Minshull Street building again to support the Courts of Justice in Crown Square. Between 1993 and 1996, the Minshull Street buildings were extensively modernised. The original courtyard was glazed over and an extension was added to the Aytoun Street side of the courts. The architect for these works was James Stevenson of the Hurd Rolland Partnership. Internally, the modernised complex at Minshull Street was laid out to accommodate 12 courts.

== Notable cases ==
In February 2023, Ming Jiang was convicted of murdering his gambling companion, Yang Liu, whose headless body was found on a country lane.

In October 2026, Simon Richardson was found guilty of murdering head teacher Michael Mullins by dragging him for more than a mile while trapped under the wheels of a car. The judge, Mrs Justice Brunner KC, told Richardson that life imprisonment was the only possible sentence.

== See also ==
- Grade II* listed buildings in Greater Manchester
- Listed buildings in Manchester-M1

== Sources ==
- Hartwell, Clare; Hyde, Matthew; Pevsner, Nikolaus (2004). Lancashire: Manchester and the South East. The Buildings of England. New Haven, CT; London: Yale University Press. ISBN 0-300-10583-5.
- Hartwell, Clare (2001). Lancashire: Manchester. Pevsner Architectural Guides. New Haven, CT; London: Yale University Press. ISBN 0-300-09666-6.
