= Pierre Williams =

British triple murderer (born 1974)

- Born: 14 April 1974 (age 52); Moss Side, Manchester, England
- Status: Imprisoned
- Penalty: Three life sentences with a minimum term of 38 years

Details
- Victims: Beverly Samuels; Kesha Wizzart; Fred Wizzart
- Date: July 12, 2007
- Country: England
- Killed: 3
- Weapon: Engineer's hammer
- Imprisoned at: March 2008

Pierre Williams (born 14 April 1974) is a British triple murderer. In 2007, Williams, who lived in the city of Manchester, travelled to the suburb of Fallowfield where he entered the house of his ex-partner Beverly Samuels and proceeded to beat her to death. He then killed Samuels' daughter Kesha Wizzart, and finally her son Fred Wizzart, using an engineer's hammer.

Pierre Williams denied the three murders in court. Williams apparently killed his victims for "sexual pleasure." Williams also mixed some of his victim's blood with coconut oil in a probable reenactment of a Biblical sacrifice.

== Early life ==
Pierre Williams was born into Manchester's working class area of Moss Side to Nigerian parents. Williams had a history of abusing women. As a teenager he was accused by a girlfriend of sexually abusing her. Williams was arrested once as a teenager on suspicion of murder, although he was not charged with the offence.

== Adulthood ==
Williams worked as a gym instructor before his apprehension. Williams had begun an on-off relationship with Beverley Samuels, after she had broken up with the children's father Fred Wizzart. However, Samuels broke off the relationship in 2004.

== Murders ==
On 12 July 2007, the murders took place at Samuels' home in the Fallowfield area of Manchester. It is unknown exactly when Williams' assault on Samuels and her two children began, as Pierre Williams has repeatedly denied murder, although police believe it occurred in the early hours. At his trial the prosecution presented overwhelming physical evidence of his involvement. Williams attacked and sexually assaulted Samuels, before assaulting, tying up, raping and murdering Kesha Wizzart. At some point in between the murders, Fred was also beaten to death at his mother's bedside before Williams finished beating Samuels to death. According to investigations, Williams took all three victims' mobile phones and sold them while driving home. Williams called 999 himself, and said that a hooded figure in the house was responsible for the murders.

== Trial ==
At the trial in March 2008 Williams was given three life sentences with a minimum term of 38 years.
