= Tony Michaelides =

British music industry executive

Anthony Michaelides (born 1953) is a British former music industry executive, known for working as a promotions executive in the music industry handling radio and TV promotions for over 30 years. In 1980, Michaelides was responsible for arranging the first televised performance outside of Ireland by U2. His clients have included U2, The Police, Peter Gabriel, David Bowie, The Stone Roses, Bob Marley, Depeche Mode, Massive Attack, New Order, Bryan Adams, Dave Matthews, Johnny Cash, The Carpenters, Matchbox Twenty, Pixies and Take That.

== Early life and career ==
Born in Fallowfield, Manchester, England, Michaelides attended Moseley Hall Grammar School and later Fielden Park College.

Beginning in 1974, Michaelides has worked with many Record Labels including Island Records, Factory Records, A&M Records, Virgin Records, and BMG. In 1997, he took on the role as publicist for David Bowie's Earthling Tour. Michaelides has received numerous accolades from music professionals and associations. After the United States Government awarded him with an Alien of Extraordinary Ability Green Card, he moved to Florida to pursue a career as an author and further his career as a professional public speaker.

Transatlantic Records – In 1974, Michaelides began his sales and marketing career working for the independent British record label Transatlantic Records, and its United States subsidiaries Blue Note, Milestone and Nonesuch, as their Northern Sales Representative. He sold jazz, folk and blues records out of his van to major record stores across Northern England.

ABC/Dunhill (Anchor Records UK) – In 1976 Michaelides, moved to ABC/Dunhill as Regional Sales Representative.

Island Records – In 1978, Michaelides joined Island Records as their Regional Promotion Manager responsible for the coordination and organisation of all media activities for their artists in Northern England. During this time, he worked with Bob Marley and the Wailers, Grace Jones, Robert Palmer, Steve_Winwood, Toots and the Maytals, and Marianne Faithfull. He also promoted Stiff Records artists, including Elvis Costello and Ian Dury. Due to financial difficulties, the entire Regional Promotions Team was laid off in 1980.

Charisma Records - Immediately upon leaving Island Records, Michaelides joined Charisma Records as Regional Promotion Manager, promoting the self-titled album tour for Peter Gabriel and the Duke tour for Genesis. After a brief stint, he left Charisma and went back to Island.

Island Records - In June 1980, Michaelides returned to Island Records to head their Regional Department. One of his first projects when returning to Island was developing the newly signed U2. On 22 September 1980, he secured an opportunity with the BBC where U2 recorded their first national radio session. That was followed by their first national TV appearance on Granada TV's Get It Together on 11 November that same year. He worked with U2, beginning with their debut album Boy, through the multi-platinum release The Joshua Tree. This was also one of Islands Records' most successful periods ever with releases from artists such as U2, Frankie Goes to Hollywood (Welcome to the Pleasuredome) and Bob Marley's album Legend, which topped the UK album chart for 12 weeks remaining on the UK chart for a total of 265 weeks. It is the best selling reggae album of all time (13.5 million platinum in US), with sales of 25 million copies.

TMP (Tony Michaelides Promotions) – The following year, 1981 Michaelides formed his own independent regional promotion company named TMP, based at Princess Street, Manchester. They were at the forefront of regional promotions and went on to become one of the largest and most successful independent promotion companies in the UK promoting both UK and international artists to regional radio and TV. TMP continued to work with Island Records and their artist roster through the 80's whilst adding A&M Records in 1983 when they began working with The Police on the release of their multi platinum album Synchronicity, which included their most successful single to date, "Every Breath You Take". In the early 1980s, he also took on all regional radio and television promotions at Factory Records for their founder Tony Wilson and continued to work with them for 10 years until their demise in the early 1990s.

The Circa - In 1986 the Circa record label, a subsidiary of Virgin Records contracted Michaelides to represent their artists, which included Massive Attack, Neneh Cherry and Hue and Cry. By the end of the decade, TMP was working with Mute Records, Depeche Mode, Rhythm King, 4AD Records and more.

In the early 1990s, Michaelides secured a contract with Arista Records and, later, with RCA Records and began working with BMG's entire roster. He went on to work with BMG for a decade, enjoying one of their most successful periods ever, with artists such as Annie Lennox, Whitney Houston, Take That, Natalie Imbruglia, Westlife and NSYNC. It was during this period that he spent several years working with Simon Fuller and Simon Cowell.

The Last Radio Program – In 1984, Michaelides replaced Mark Radcliffe on Piccadilly Radio, presenting their specialist music program The Last Radio Programme for Key 103 in Manchester. He took the on-air name of "Tony the Greek" and remained as presenter for this program for the next 13 years. Throughout the show, Michaelides helped to launch careers for bands like The Stone Roses, Happy Mondays, Simply Red, James and R.E.M. He conducted interviews with artists regularly and was arguably one of the first to introduce the now-familiar acoustic set to UK radio in 1985. While working on The Last Radio Show, Michaelides was nominated for several Sony Music Awards for Best Specialist Music Show.

Beginning with its inception in 1992, he was a regular panelist and moderator at the UK's major music conference, In The City, and was also one of the founding members of The Manchester Music City Network. Around 2000, Michaelides became a consultant for the Manchester Business Consortium, while providing expert advice to the Music Managers Forum's Master Classes. Shortly after he was also recruited to become a member of the Brits Voting Academy.

In 1997, Michaelides was asked to be publicist for David Bowie's Earthling Tour, responsible for press, radio and television. The following year, TMP worked closely with Michael Lippman and Lippman Entertainment, one of the world's most successful management companies, to launch Matchbox Twenty in the UK. At the same time, he was also a working with Warner Chappell's Los Angeles office and Atlantic Records' New York office.

He continued mentoring sessions in the UK as well as Canada's North by Northeast festival until deciding to move to the United States in 2004. Prior to relocating to the U.S., Michaelides was awarded a green card by the United States Government as an "Alien of Extraordinary Ability". This is a classification that is granted only to "that small percentage who have risen to the very top of the field of endeavor". For the next few years, and upon relocation, he continued as a consultant and mentor for emerging artists, as well as presenting his own radio show The Promised Land for Fab Radio International, a large internet radio station based in Manchester, UK.

Magic Leap - In December 2010, Michaelides joined Magic Leap, a U.S.-based multimedia augmented reality company utilising his past working with musicians and artists around the world to bring in content as well as promoting the company. His early achievements with the company included bringing onboard the former president of Virgin USA, Ray Cooper. Founder of Magic Leap, Rony Abovitz, gave Tony the title of "Chief Evangelist, Zen Master, Head of the School of Cool".

Michaelides continues working as an Artist Development Consultant and has become an author. His first book, Insights Collection: Insights From The Engine Room, was published in late 2009. In 2023, he published his second book, Moments that Rock, which is also the title of his podcast hosted by Pantheon Media Group.

Michaelides resides in Maryland and continues writing and speaking to multi-disciplinary audiences both domestically and internationally. He also presents two radio shows together with his podcast.
