= Louisa Carbutt =

British educator and civil rights advocate

- Born: 25 September 1832; Hamburg
- Died: 4 May 1907 (aged 74); Paignton, England
- Occupation: Headteacher
- Spouse: William Henry Herford

Louisa Carbutt later Louisa Herford (25 September 1832 – 4 May 1907) was a British schoolmistress and educational pioneer. She ran her own school. After it closed she married another headteacher who ran Lady Barn House School. His first wife had died four years before.

== Life ==
Carbutt was born at Altona near Hamburg in 1832. Her parents were Louise Petronella and Francis Carbutt. Her father, a merchant and mayor of Leeds, had been a Quaker but he became a Unitarian. Her younger brother was Sir Edward Carbutt M.P. became an engineer. Her parents had progressive views on their children's education and in particular the daughters. She was sent to good boarding school and by the time she left in 1847, she had become proficient in four languages. She was not expected to marry but to decide her own career and she chose to teach German.

Carbutt was asked if she would teach two children and she decided that she could use this as the basis of founding a school. The Brook House School opened in August 1860 with a small number of pupils. The school's approach was unusual in that the students were neither rewarded nor punished. Nevertheless, the students were allowed more freedom than was usually permitted in comparable schools. One of the people she employed was William Henry Herford. He was a Unitarian minister, but he was also a writer and educator. They had similar views on education and she eventually became his second wife when in her 50s.

In 1866 she was one of the people, mostly women, who signed the petition to parliament to request that women be allowed to vote.

Brook House school closed in 1870 as Carbutt had health problems and she went to live in Leeds again where she was elected a Poor Law Guardian. This was an unusual position for a woman at that time.

In 1884 she married William Herford. Herford had started Lady Barn House School in 1873 which unusually was co-educational. The original announcement in the Manchester Guardian stated that Mr and Mrs Herford planned to start a school for boys and girls up to the age of thirteen. Herford's first wife had died in 1880.

Carbutt died in Paignton in 1907. Her husband died in the following year.
