= William Henry Herford =

English minister

William Henry Herford (1820–1908) was an English Unitarian minister, writer and educator. He was interested in education and married a school head mistress, Louisa Carbutt.

== Early life ==
Born at Coventry, 20 October 1820, he was fourth son in a family of six sons and three daughters of John Herford and his first wife, Sarah, daughter of Edward Smith of Birmingham (uncle of Joshua Toulmin Smith); Brooke Herford was a younger brother. His father, a liberal and Unitarian, became a wine merchant in Manchester in 1822, residing at Altrincham, where his wife ran a girls' school.

After attending a school kept by Charles Wallace, Unitarian minister at Hale Barns, Herford was from 1831 to 1834 a day boy at Shrewsbury School under Samuel Butler. From 1834 to 1836 he was at Manchester grammar school. Then, destined for the Unitarian ministry, he was prepared for entry at the ministerial college at York by John Relly Beard.

== German and Swiss influences ==
From 1837 to 1840, Herford studied at Manchester College, York, and while there came into contact with German philosophy and theology. He moved with the college from York to Manchester in the summer of 1840, and thus came under the influence of three new professors, Francis Newman, James Martineau, and John James Tayler, the last of whom he regarded as his "spiritual father". Graduating B.A. of London University in the autumn of 1840, he began to preach in Unitarian pulpits, but declined a permanent engagement as minister at Lancaster in order to accept a scholarship for three years' study in Germany.

In 1842, Herford went to Bonn University, where he attended the courses of Ernst Moritz Arndt, August Wilhelm Schlegel, and Friedrich Christoph Dahlmann, and formed a close friendship with his contemporary Wilhelm Ihne. After two years there he spent eight months in Berlin, where he was admitted to the family circles of August Neander and Christian Gottfried Ehrenberg. In the summer of 1845 he accepted an invitation from a Unitarian congregation at Lancaster, where he remained a year.

In 1846, Lady Byron invited Herford, on James Martineau's recommendation, to undertake the tuition of Ralph King, younger son of her daughter, Ada, Countess of Lovelace. Herford, early in 1847, accompanied the boy to Wilhelm von Fellenberg's Pestalozzian school at Hofwyl, near Bern. Herford grew close to von Fellenberg, became a temporary teacher on the staff, and took to Pestalozzi's and Froebel's educational ideas.

== Educator ==
In February 1848 Herford resumed his pastorate at Lancaster, deciding also to work out in a systematic way educational ideas which he had developed at Hofwyl. In January 1850, while retaining his ministerial duties, he opened at Lancaster a school for boys on Pestalozzian principles. It continued for eleven years, when a decline in its numbers caused him to transfer it to other hands.

Resigning his pastorate at the same time, Herford with his family went for eighteen months to Zurich in charge of a pupil. On his return in September 1863, he filled the pulpit of the Free Church in Manchester until 1869, acquiring a reputation as a teacher and lecturer, especially to women and girls: he was an advocate of the opening of universities to women. Some of his teaching was given at Brooke House School, Knutsford, whose headmistress, Louisa Carbutt (afterwards Herford's second wife). He shared her views on educating girls although she gave up the school in 1870. She had signed the 1866 petition for women to be given the vote.

Herford and his wife then formed a plan of a co-educational school for younger children. The original announcement in the Manchester Guardian stated that Mr and Mrs Herford planned to start a school for boys and girls for children up to the age of thirteen. In 1873 he opened his co-educational school at Fallowfield, Manchester, and then moved it to Ladybarn House, Withington, as Lady Barn House School. For twelve years he ran it in an individual style. Resigning the school to his second daughter in 1886, he concentrated on writing and travel.

== Botanist ==
Some of his plant collections are in the Charterhouse School Herbarium at the University and Jepson Herbaria, University of California, Berkeley.

== Last years ==
He and Louisa moved to Paignton in Devon where they shocked some there with their ideas. She died there in 1907 and he died there on 27 April 1908. He was buried there.

== Works ==
Herford published in 1889 his major work The School: an Essay towards Humane Education, based on his teaching experience. In 1893 he published The Student's Froebel, adapted from Die Menschenerziehung of Friedrich Fröbel (1893; revised edit., posthumous, with memoir by Charles Harold Herford, 1911). In 1902 he published Passages from the Life of an Educational Free Lance, a translation of the Aus dem Leben eines freien Pädagogen of Dr. Ewald Haufe.

== Family ==
Herford married:

1. in September 1848 Elizabeth Anne (died 1880), daughter of Timothy Davis, minister of the Presbyterian chapel, Evesham, by whom he had three sons and four daughters;
2. in 1884 Louisa, daughter of Francis Carbutt of Leeds, and from 1860 to 1870 headmistress of Brooke House, Knutsford, who died in 1907 without issue.

== Notes ==
Attribution

This article incorporates text from a publication now in the public domain: Lee, Sidney, ed. (1912). "Herford, William Henry". Dictionary of National Biography (2nd supplement). Vol. 2. London: Smith, Elder & Co.
