= Thomas Arthur Helme =

English physician (1866–1921)

Dr Thomas Arthur Helme FRSE MRCS MRCP (1866 – 5 September 1921) was an English physician and obstetrician. He was noted for his work in social care and advancements in gynaecology.

== Life ==
He was born in Preston the son of Margaret Waterhouse (1841–1881) and John Helme (1841–1881). He had two brothers: Edgar Helme and Milner Helme.

He studied medicine at the University of Edinburgh graduating with an MB ChB in 1885 and, after further studies at the University of Strasbourg, received his doctorate (MD) in 1889. Upon qualifying he worked briefly as a GP in Fallowfield in Manchester with a Dr John Priestley but this was dissolved in September 1889. He then began working at the Women's Dispensary in Edinburgh then became Resident Surgeon at the Royal Maternity Hospital on Lauriston Place in Edinburgh.

In 1890, he was elected a Fellow of the Royal Society of Edinburgh. His proposers were Andrew Douglas Maclagan, Sir William Turner, Alexander Hugh Freeland Barbour, and Sir German Sims Woodhead.

He then left Edinburgh to become Resident Obstetrician at St Mary's Hospital for Women and Children in Manchester.

During the First World War he was Chairman of the Medical War Committee for Manchester and Salford.

He died on 5 September 1921.
