= Leonard Cecil Howitt =

British architect (1896–1964)

Leonard Cecil Howitt FRIBA
- Born: 27 December 1896; Islington, London, England
- Died: 20 May 1964 (aged 67); Brooklands, Sale, Greater Manchester, England
- Citizenship: British
- Education: University of Liverpool School of Architecture
- Occupation: Architect
- Years active: 1925–1961
- Known for: Manchester City Architect
- Children: 3
- Parents: William Howitt (father); Ada Howitt (mother)
- Practice: Herbert J. Rowse Architects; Manchester Corporation
- Buildings: Heaton Park Reservoir Pumping Station (1955), Wythenshawe Fire Station (1957), Blackley Crematorium (1959), Toast Rack (1960), Manchester Crown Court (1962), Manchester Airport Terminal Building (1962)
- Projects: Mersey Tunnel, Free Trade Hall

Leonard Cecil Howitt (27 December 1896 – 20 May 1964) – often referred to as L. C. Howitt – served in both World Wars and was Manchester City Council's chief architect from 1946 until he retired in 1961.

== Life ==
Leonard Howitt was born on 27 December 1896 in Islington, London. His parents were William Howitt, a type founder, and his wife Ada. After her husband's death in about 1910, Ada Howitt returned to Manchester with her son. Howitt died at his home in Brooklands, Sale on 20 May 1964 aged 67. He was survived by his wife, two daughters, and a son.

== Career ==
Howitt started work in the architect's office at Manchester Town Hall shortly before the First World War. After war service, he attended the University of Liverpool School of Architecture from where he graduated in 1925. He then joined Herbert J. Rowse Architects in Liverpool where he remained until 1934. He was part of the team that designed the Mersey Tunnel (Queensway) ventilation towers. He was appointed chief architectural assistant to Liverpool City Council's Director of Housing before returning to Manchester as deputy city architect in 1937. Howitt served in the army during World War II, rising to the rank of major.

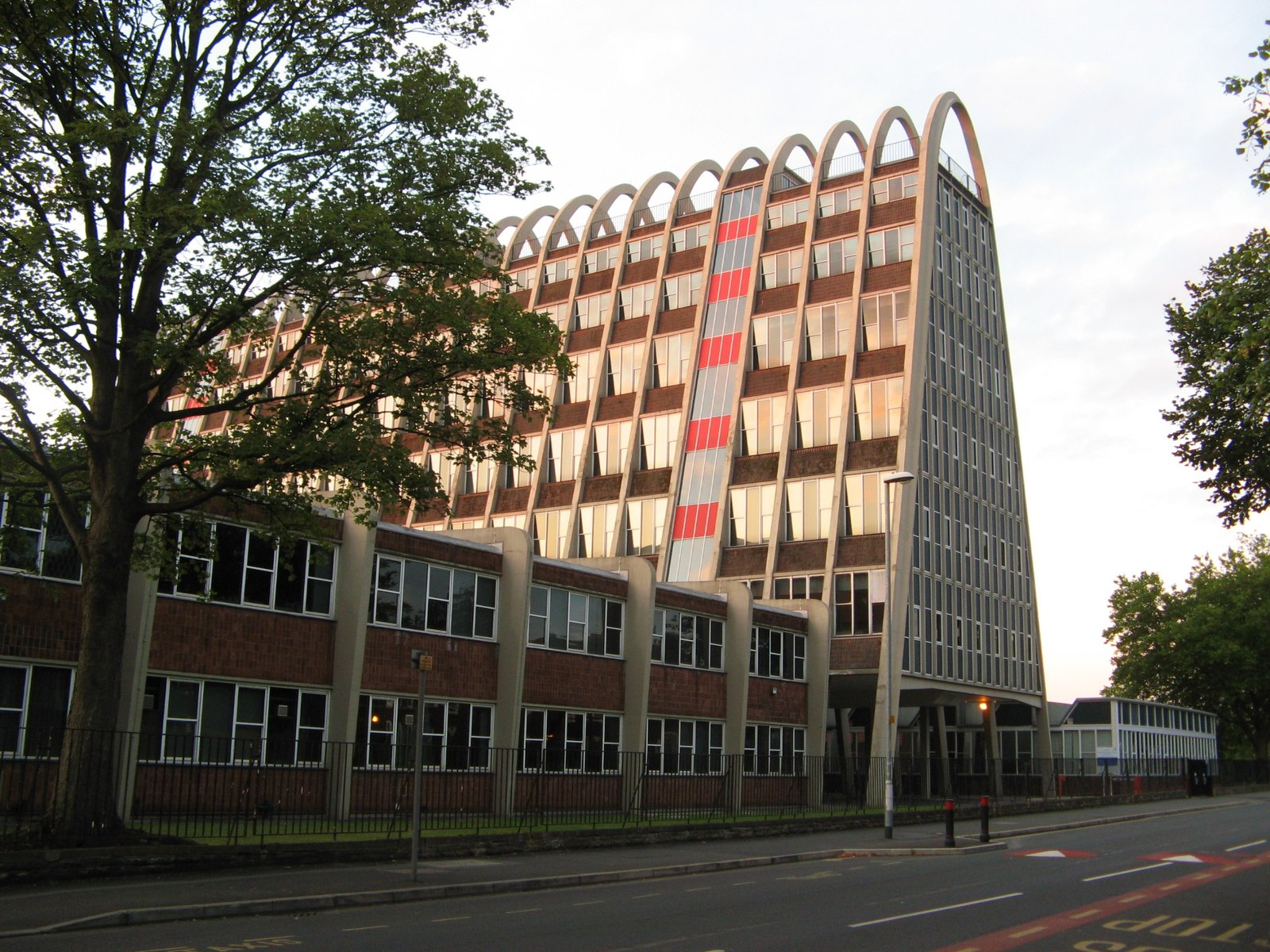
The Toast Rack building at Hollings College

In 1945, Howitt returned to Manchester as acting city architect. The following year he was appointed City Architect, succeeding G. Noel Hill, a position he held until he retired in 1961. He designed many schools, colleges and other buildings for the corporation and was responsible for reconstructing the Free Trade Hall after it was damaged in the Manchester Blitz. He designed the Courts of Justice (1957–1962) and Hollings College (1957–1960), known locally as the Toast Rack. Other than schools, few buildings erected during Howitt's tenure as city architect survive. His Terminal Building at Manchester Airport was remodelled by his successor, Sidney George Besant-Roberts. Other surviving buildings are Hollings College, Heaton Park Reservoir Pumping Station (1955), Wythenshawe Fire Station (1957), Blackley Crematorium (1959), Wythenshawe Bowls and Tennis Pavilion (1960) and the Manchester Courts of Justice. After retiring from the corporation in 1961 he entered private practice in Manchester in partnership with Leonard J Tucker.

Howitt became a Fellow of the Royal Institute of British Architects in March 1942, served on its council for twelve years and was its vice-president from 1956 to 1958. He was president of the Manchester Society of Architects from 1955 until 1957 and served on other professional bodies.
