= Lady Barn House School =

Coordinates: 53.383°N 2.2151°W

Location
- Schools Hill; Cheadle, Greater Manchester, SK8 1JE; England

Information
- Type: Independent Primary School
- Religious affiliation: Christian
- Established: 1873
- Founder: W. H. Herford
- Local authority: Stockport
- Headteacher: Ms. L. Higson
- Gender: Coeducational
- Age: 3 years to 11 years
- Houses: Bonner, Herford, Jenkin Jones and Scott
- Colours: Blue and Yellow
- Website: http://www.ladybarnhouse.org

Lady Barn House School is an independent primary school in Cheadle, Greater Manchester, England. It moved to its present location from Ladybarn, Manchester, in the 1950s. It was founded in 1873 by W. H. Herford, who was also the first headteacher.

== History ==
=== Foundation ===
The school was started in 1873 by William Henry Herford (1820–1908) and his wife. Herford was born in Coventry but moved to Manchester in 1822; he practised the Unitarian ministry from 1848–1854 and again at the Upper Brook Street Chapel from 1866–1870. The school represented the desire of Herford to put into practice the ideals promoted by Fröbel and Pestalozzi. Herford, “a pioneer in dark days”, had witnessed teaching techniques employed in Switzerland and Germany, and desired to reform the methods practised in England. Another influence on Herford was Philipp Emanuel von Fellenberg. "The Day School for Boys and Girls" began in an unidentified house on Wilmslow Road, Withington, on 18 April 1873, and within a few years moved to Lady Barn House nearby which gave the school its name. In its early years the school was strongly supported by the German community of Manchester: 111 pupils joined the school in the first 10 years and 42 of them had German names.

=== 1873–1904 ===
Lady Barn opened with nine pupils attracted by an advert placed by "Mr and Mrs Herford". For a considerable period its future was tenuous, nevertheless, a kindergarten was added for children under six years in 1878. Mrs Herford died in 1880, but William married again to an experienced headteacher Louisa Carbutt. In its early years Fallowfield formed part of Withington (from 1894 administered by the Withington Urban District Council) but was absorbed into the city of Manchester in 1904. By the year 1904, the roll revealed a school of about seventy boys and girls. One of the controversial but cardinal principles of the school was its active promotion of co-education. Many of the educational experts of the time disagreed with the concepts of boys and girls being educated together; but Miss Herford stated in the early 20th century “that the presence of boys and girls in every class has been a stimulus to good work in both teacher and taught”. It was at a meeting held in the drawing room of Lady Barn that it was decided to found Withington Girls' School (founded 1890).

=== 1904–present ===
C. P. Scott, the editor of The Manchester Guardian, was chairman of the board of governors from 1904 to 1934. In 1922 Miss C. M. Jenkin Jones became the new headmistress and remained in the post until 1960 when she resigned on grounds of ill health (from the 1930s to 1960 she was also the proprietor). For three years during the Second World War the school was evacuated to Great Budworth in Cheshire. The University of Manchester provided some financial support for the school for about ten years from 1935 and used it in their teacher training courses. In the 1950s the school was moved to Ashdale, Cheadle. On Miss Jones's retirement she generously transferred ownership of the school to the other directors who then became trustees. During the tenure of the next headmistress, Miss B. Noakes, the school moved to Langlands in 1961.

== Headteachers ==
- William Henry Herford 1873–1886
- Miss Caroline Herford 1886–1907
- Miss Beard 1907–1915
- Miss R. H. Rees 1915–1917
- Miss I. Lawrence 1917–1922
- Miss C. M. Jenkin Jones 1922–1960
- Miss B. Noakes 1960–1970
- Mr. E. J. Bonner 1970–2002
- Mrs. S. Yule 2002–2011
- Mrs. S. Marsh 2011–2016
- Mr. M.Turner 2016–2021
- Ms. L. Higson 2021–present

== Notable former pupils ==
- Siegfried Herford (1891–1916), climber
- Major-General John Hay Beith (Ian Hay) (1876–1952), novelist and dramatist
- Marghanita Laski (1915–1988), writer
- Caroline Lejeune (1897–1973), critic
- Beryl Reid (1920–1996), comedian and actress
- Kathleen Ollerenshaw (Dame Kathleen Ollerenshaw), (1912-2014), mathematician and councillor
