= Toast Rack (building) =

Listed building in Manchester, England

Hollings Building
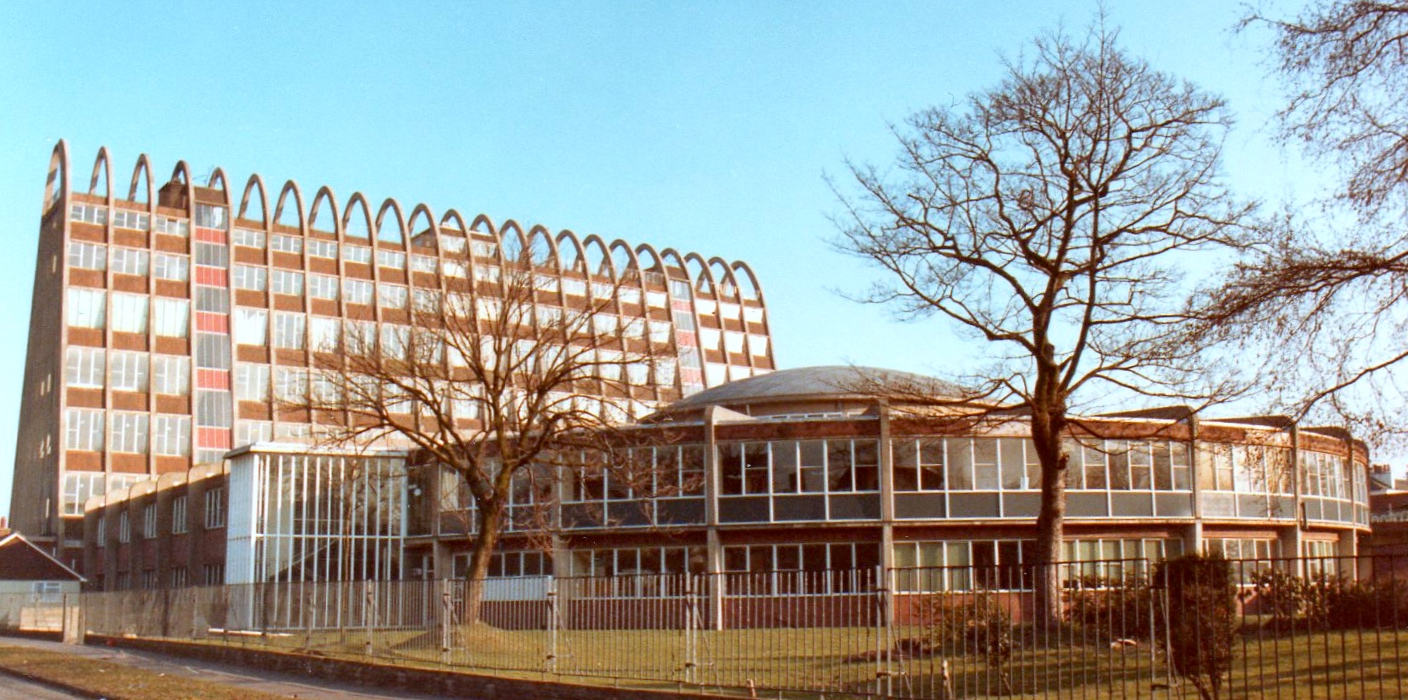
- The "Toast Rack" and "Poached Egg"
- Alternative names: The Toast Rack

General information
- Type: Academic (1960–2013)
- Architectural style: Modernist
- Location: Fallowfield, Manchester, England
- Coordinates: 53.4473854°N 2.2167121°W
- Construction started: 1957
- Opened: 1960
- Inaugurated: 8 March 1962
- Renovated: 1994
- Owner: Estrela Properties Ltd

Design and construction
- Architect: LC Howitt
- Designations

Listed Building – Grade II
- Official name: Hollings Building at Manchester Metropolitan University
- Designated: 24 April 1998
- Reference no.: 1119722

The Toast Rack, formerly known as the Hollings Building, is a Modernist building in Fallowfield, Manchester, England. The building was completed in 1960 as the Domestic Trades College. It became part of Manchester Polytechnic then Manchester Metropolitan University until the closure of the "Hollings Campus" in 2013.

It was designed by the city architect, Leonard Cecil Howitt and is known as the Toast Rack due to its distinctive form, which reflects its use as a catering college.

== Construction ==
It was to cost £650,000. The Municipal Domestic and Trades College was to be 134 ft high, also known as the Central School of Domestic Economy. The Clothing Institute wanted the building to be built. It would teach hair dressing, with beauty salons, and manufacture of clothing.

The main building was known as The Prism, with consultants LG Mouchel, and main contractors J Gerrard and Sons of Swinton.

It was opened by Princess Margaret on 8 March 1962, who had flown to Manchester Airport in a Heron aircraft. She also opened the Albert Memorial CE Secondary Modern School in Collyhurst. The site had cost £805,000. It was called the Hollings College for the Food and Fashion Industries.

The architecture critic Nikolaus Pevsner described the building as "a perfect piece of pop architecture". It was Grade II listed in April 1998 by English Heritage who describe the structure as, "a distinctive and memorable building which demonstrates this architect's love of structural gymnastics in a dramatic way". To others the building symbolises the ideals of the Festival of Britain and architectural positivity following the Second World War.

== Structure ==
The building's structure consists of a concrete frame with a brick infill on the bottom half of each storey. The building is seven storeys high and its hyperbolic paraboloid frame continues on the exterior, hence the toast rack comparison. Although the building's unorthodox form is playful, its tapering shape also helps to divide space into varying sizes for larger and smaller classes. A semi-circular restaurant block is attached to the west and is informally known as the "Poached Egg".

== History ==
Manchester Metropolitan University left their Hollings campus in 2013 as they consolidated their facilities towards the city centre. The building was then put up for sale, being bought by developers for £4 million in 2014. There are plans to redevelop the building with flats, a leisure centre and a rooftop garden. In 2023 the Toast Rack and its adjacent buildings were put on the market with planning consent for a mixed-use development.

== See also ==
- Listed buildings in Manchester-M14
