= Ladybarn =

Area of Manchester, England

Ladybarn is a small suburban area of south Manchester, England.

Ladybarn Village is along Mauldeth Road; to the north is Ladybarn Lane. Transport links include Mauldeth Road railway station and buses to Manchester city centre.

The area is named after Lady Barn House, formerly Lady Barn House School, founded in 1873 by William Henry Herford.

== Ladybarn Park ==
Ladybarn Park
- Interactive map of Ladybarn Park
- Type: Urban park, recreational space
- Location: Ladybarn, Manchester, England
- Coordinates: 53°25′57.8″N 2°12′36.8″W
- Area: 23.4 acres (9.5 ha)
- Created: Approx 1889
- Operator: Manchester City Council
- Status: Open year-round
- Public transit: Withington tram stop (approx. 15-minute walk); Didsbury Village tram stop (approx. 10-minute walk)
- Website: Ladybarn Park information at Manchester City Council

Ladybarn Park is an urban park covering 23.4 acres (9.5 ha) which includes several recreational facilities, such as sports areas and a children's play area.

== See also ==
- Fletcher Moss Botanical Garden
- Fog Lane Park
