= List of mills in Manchester =

This is a list of the cotton and other textile mills in Manchester, England.

== Mills ==
Name	Owners	Location	Built	Demolished	Served (Years)
Albany Works		SD 882 007 53°30′11″N 2°10′44″W			
Albert Mill		SJ 875 941 53°26′38″N 2°11′24″W			
Albion Mill		Pollard Street, Ancoats 53°28′45″N 2°13′14″W			
	Notes: J. and J. L. Gray; John Hetherington & Sons				
Alexandre Works		SD 855 022 53°30′58″N 2°13′12″W			
Anchor Works		SD 845 013 53°30′29″N 2°14′06″W			
Aquatite Mills		SJ 839 999 53°29′46″N 2°14′38″W			
Ashenhurst Works		Blackley SD 847 030 53°31′23″N 2°13′55″W			
	Notes: 1891- W. D. Ryde, Sons and Co, silk weavers				
Ashleigh Mills		SD 847 012 53°43′19″N 2°19′12″W			
Atlantic Works		SD838 000 53°29′46″N 2°14′46″W			
Atlas Mills		SJ876 942 53°26′38″N 2°11′17″W			
Bank of England Mills		SJ 857 984 53°28′55″N 2°13′01″W			
Beehive Mill		Jersey Street, Ancoats SJ850987 53°29′06″N 2°13′41″W	1824		202
	Grade II* listed building.Notes: Built as Room and Power mill 1891-B. and I. Wild, 12,000 spindles				
Bengal Street Block		SJ 851 986 53°29′02″N 2°13′34″W	1848		178
	Notes: 1848- extension of Beehive Mill; 1861- Part rebuilt after fire 1891-C. E. Bennett and Co, together with Union Mill, 16,000 spindles 2005-Destroyed by fire				
Beswick Street Mills		SJ858 985 53°28′59″N 2°12′54″W			
	Notes: 1891-Peter Joynson and Co (silk and fancy dress goods), 500 looms				
Beswick		Bradford Street SJ863 986 53°29′02″N 2°12′29″W			
Big Cotton Mill		SJ 876 942 53°26′38″N 2°11′17″W			
Bowker Bank Print Works		SD847 030 53°31′23″N 2°13′55″W			
	Notes: 1891-John F. Hill and Co, calico printers				
Bradford Mill		SJ872 986 53°29′02″N 2°11′38″W			
Bradford Road Mill		SJ857 986 53°29′02″N 2°13′01″W			
Bridge Mill		SJ856 985 53°28′59″N 2°13′05″W			
Broom House		SJ882 940 53°26′35″N 2°10′44″W			
Brownsfield Mill		Binns Place, Gt Ancoats St, Ancoats SJ849 984 53°28′55″N 2°13′44″W	c.1825		
	Grade II* listed building.Notes: (Room and power) on Great Ancoats Street, Seven storeys L-shaped formation. In 1910, Verdon Roe established the AV Roe Company manufacturing aeroplanes.				
Brunswick Mill		Bradford Road, Ancoats SJ859 987 53°29′06″N 2°12′50″W	1840		186
	Grade II listed building.Notes: Adjacent to the Ashton Canal, it had seven storeys. 35 bays faced directly onto the canal, four storey block completing the courtyard with entrance on Bradford Road. It was built by builder David Bellhouse. In the 1850s it had some 276 carding machines, and 77,000 mule spindles. In 1891, owned by Bannerman Mills Co, Limited, it had 73,000 spindles.				
Cambridge Street India Rubber Works	Hugh Birley	Cambridge Street, Chorlton-on-Medlock SJ837974 53°28′23″N 2°14′49″W	1900s		
	Grade II listed building.Notes: Owned by Charles Macintosh & Company who produced rubberised waterproofs. The word mackintosh became the generic term for waterproof overcoats				
Chain Bar Mill		SD882031 53°31′26″N 2°10′44″W			
	Notes:				
Chatham Mill; Runcorn's Mill		Chester Street, Chorlton-on-Medlock SJ840973 53°28′19″N 2°14′35″W	1820		206
	Grade II listed building.Notes: Built 1820 with an adjoining 1823 built warehouse at right angles. 6 storeys. The mill has wooden floors (not fireproof) but the warehouse has iron columns. There is a truncated chimney at the back.				
Chatsworth Mill		SJ882 961 53°27′43″N 2°10′44″W			
	Notes: 1891-Robert Williams, finisher, dresser, waterer, embosser, etc				
Chepstow Street Mill		Oxford Street SJ838978 53°28′37″N 2°14′46″W	1813–20	1990	
	Notes: 1891-Wadkin and King, together with Springfields Mill, Salford, 30,000 spindles				
Chorlton Mill complex	Birley family	Little Ireland Chorlton-on-Medlock SJ838 974 53°28′23″N 2°14′46″W			
	Notes: Most of the site is under the Manchester Metropolitan University buildings. Chorlton Old Mill rebuilt 1866; Chorlton New Mill 1814, 1818, 1845; Marsland Mill				
Chorlton New Mills	Birley family	Cambridge Street, Chorlton-on-Medlock SJ838 974 53°28′23″N 2°14′46″W	1813		213
	Notes: Grade II listed building Part of Chorlton Mill complex Cotton spinning mill, afterwards partially used as rubber processing works. Built 1813, extended in 1818 and 1845, with chimney dated 1853. Developed by a partnership which also operated the nearby Chorlton Old Mill and other mills on Oxford Road which are no longer standing. By 1838 they were in partnership with Charles Macintosh who was making rubberised cloth at the nearby Cambridge Street rubber works site.				
Chorlton Old Mill; Cambridge Mill	Birley family	Cambridge Street, Chorlton-on-Medlock SJ839 973 53°28′19″N 2°14′38″W	1866		160
	Notes: Grade II listed building Part of Chorlton Mill complex Earlier mill built in 1795 managed by Robert Owen, considerably extended c.1810, and then largely rebuilt in 1866. Converted to accommodation in 1993.				
Chorlton Twist Mill		Cambridge Street, Chorlton-on-Medlock SJ842 973 53°28′19″N 2°14′20″W	1795	1866	71
	Notes: built 1795 for Robert Owen and partners. Rebuilt 1866 as Chorlton Old Mill				
City Corn Mill		SJ851 987 53°29′06″N 2°13′34″W			
Clayton Works		SJ879 984 53°28′55″N 2°11′02″W			
Collyhurst Works		Collyhurst SJ849 998 53°29′42″N 2°13′44″W			
Crumpsall Mill		Factory Lane, Harpurhey SD855 021 53°30′54″N 2°13′12″W			
	Notes: 1891-Crumpsall Mill Co, 40,000 spindles and 300 looms				
Crusader Works aka Chapeltown Street Mill	Mid 19th C	SJ851980 53°28′44″N 2°13′34″W			
	Grade II listed building.Notes: Original for spinning, then used for machine manufacture, then as a garment factory. It was the home to Rogue Studios and other businesses for ten years. It was purchased for redevelopment in 2015 by the Manchester based company Capital and Centric for redevelopment where they propose to only sell apartments for owner occupation to private individuals.				
Culcheth Lane Mill		SD884001 53°29′49″N 2°10′34″W			
	Notes: 1891- Robinson and Trevor, 130 looms				
Daisy Bank Mill		Terence St, Newton Heath SD887002 53°29′53″N 2°10′19″W	1848–56	2019	
	Notes: 1891-Alexander Bedell and Co, 236 looms				
Decker Mill	Murray Mills	Redhill Street, Ancoats SJ 851 986 53°29′02″N 2°13′34″W	1802		224
	Notes: Grade II* listed building (with Old Mill); Part of Murray Mills complex				
Doubling Mill see Waulk Mill		Ancoats , SJ 851 986 53°29′02″N 2°13′34″W			
Drinkwater's Mill See; Piccadilly Mill		SJ 845 979 53°28′41″N 2°14′06″W			
Fireproof Mill see Waulk Mill		Ancoats , SJ 851 986 53°29′02″N 2°13′34″W			
Garratt Mill		SJ 843 975 53°28′26″N 2°14′17″W			
Gorebrook Works		SJ 875 956 53°27′25″N 2°11′24″W			
Gorton Wadding Works		SJ891 966 53°27′58″N 2°09′58″W			
Great Bridgewater Street Mills		Great Bridgewater St , SJ837 975 53°28′26″N 2°14′49″W			
Great Marlborough Street Mills		SJ840 974 53°28′23″N 2°14′35″W			
Hanover Mill		Berry Street SJ 849 976 53°28′30″N 2°13′44″W			
	Notes: 1891-Hanover Mill Co,				
Harpurhey Dyeworks		Harpurhey SD854 014 53°30′32″N 2°13′19″W			
	Notes: 1891-Harpurhey Printing Co, bleachers, dyers, finishers and calico printers				
Havelock Mills		SJ 837 975 53°28′26″N 2°14′49″W			
	Notes: 1891-Greenough, Occleston and Co, smallware				
Heaton Mills		Blackley SD 844 046 53°32′17″N 2°14′13″W			
	Notes: 1891-Whittaker and Harwood, silk and cotton yarn dyers				
Holt Town Works		SJ 862 986 53°29′02″N 2°12′32″W			
Hope Mill		Pollard Street, Ancoats SJ 857 985 53°28′59″N 2°13′01″W			
	Notes: Grade II* listed building Built 1824 for Joseph Clarke and Sons, with later 19th and 20th century additions and alterations. 1891-John Jackson Junior, 2000 spindles 20th century-John Hetherington and Sons, textile machine makers				
Jackson Street Mills		SJ847 976 53°28′30″N 2°13′55″W			
	Notes: 1891-Jackson Street Spinning Co, 85,000 spindles				
Knutsford Vale Works		SJ875 956 53°27′25″N 2°11′24″W			
Levenshulme Works		SJ 883 946 53°26′53″N 2°10′41″W			
	Notes: 1891-Thomas Boyd and Co, calico and muslin printers				
Little Green Works		Collyhurst Road, Collyhurst SD 849 001 53°29′49″N 2°13′44″W			
	Notes: 1891-John Walton, Little Green Dye Works, dyer and finisher				
Little Mill	Murray Mills	Jersey Street, Ancoats SJ 851 986 53°29′02″N 2°13′34″W	1908		118
	Notes: Grade II listed building Part of Murray Mills complex Built in 1908 on site of earlier mill (c.1820). Earliest mill in Greater Manchester built to use mains electricity as principal power source.				
Lloydsfield Mill		Miles Platting SJ 856 991 53°29′17″N 2°13′05″W			
	Notes:				
Macintosh's Mill see:Cambridge Street India Rubber Works		Chorlton-on-Medlock	1837		189
McConnel and Kennedy Mills complex		Redhill Street, Ancoats			
	Notes: Royal Mill 1797; Sedgewick Mill, 1818–1820; Sedgewick New Mill 1912; Paragon Mill 1912, 8 storey. Worlds tallest cast iron structure when built. Alexis de Tocqueville, described Redhill Street Mill in 1835 as "a place where some 1500 workers, labouring 69 hours a week, with an average wage of 11 shillings, and where three-quarters of the workers are women and children". It was the biggest mill in the Manchester region. Further buildings were added in 1868 and 1912. In 1891 McConnel and Co, Limited had 130,000 spindles				
Marslands Mill		Cambridge St/Chester St, Chorlton SJ 840 973 53°28′19″N 2°14′35″W			
	Notes: Part of Chorlton Mill complex Grade II listed building				
Maskrey Mill, later Marlborough Mill		Union Street, Ardwick SJ855975 53°28′26″N 2°13′08″W	1810s/20s	1950s/60s	
	Notes: To 1828, William Maskrey. 1830s-70s, Thomas Barton and Sons. 1870s, now "Marlborough Mill", Jones & Co. 1920s-50s, Charles E. Austin & Sons, Ltd.				
Medlock Mill aka Hotspur Press		SJ 838 973 53°28′19″N 2°14′46″W	1794-1801		
	Notes:				
Monsall Mills		Newton Heath SD 863 009 53°30′18″N 2°12′29″W			
	Notes: 1891-William Hall and Co, yarn dyers, printers, winders, warpers and bleachers				
Moston Mill		Moston SD 885 027 53°31′16″N 2°10′30″W			
	Notes: 1891-Samuel Barlow and Co Ltd, yarn dyers and printers				
Murrays' Mills complex		Murray Street, Ancoats			
	Notes: Old Mill 1798; Decker Mill 1801; New Mill 1804; Murray Street Block 1804; Doubling/Fireproof Mill 1842; Little Mill (rebuilt) 1908; 1891-A. and G. Murray Limited, 100,000 spindles				
Murray Street Block		SJ 851 986 53°29′02″N 2°13′34″W	1804		222
	Notes:				
Neptune Mill		Chapeltown Street, Picadilly East, Grade II listed building Former cotton mill restored and transformed into workspace with exposed original brickwork, timber beams and cast iron columns.			
New Mill	Murray Mills	Jersey Street, Ancoats SJ 851 986 53°29′02″N 2°13′34″W	1804		222
	Notes: Grade II listed building Part of Murray Mills complex				
New Old Mill see Royal Mill	McConnel and Kennedy Mills	Ancoats , SJ 850 985 53°28′59″N 2°13′41″W	1912		114
Newton Silk Mill		Holyoak Street, Newton Heath SD 882 007 53°30′11″N 2°10′44″W	1832		194
	Notes: Grade II listed building Now office accommodation				
Old Mill	Murray Mills	Redhill Street, Ancoats SJ 851 986 53°29′02″N 2°13′34″W	1798		228
	Notes: Grade II* listed building (with Decker Mill); Part of Murray Mills complex				
Old Mill, Henry Street		McConnel and Kennedy Mills SJ 849 985 53°28′59″N 2°13′44″W	1798		228
	Notes: Built for James McConnel and John Kennedy; With 8 floors and an area of 650 square yards. Gas lighting was installed in 1809 by Boulton & Watt. By 1811, with a downturn in trade the firm of McConnel & Kennedy went bankrupt (to re-emerge later); Rebuilt in 1912 as the New Old Mill (later Royal Mill)				
Paragon Mill	McConnel and Kennedy Mills	Ancoats SJ 849 985 53°28′59″N 2°13′44″W	1912		114
	Notes: Part of McConnel and Kennedy Mills complex Grade II* listed building				
Phoenix Mill		Piercy street, Ancoats SJ 855 984 53°28′55″N 2°13′12″W			
	Notes: (Room and Power) Doubling; 1891-W. Richardson, 5000 spindles and William Wild and Son, 6,000 spindles				
Piccadilly Mill aka Drinkwater's Mill		SJ 845 979 53°28′41″N 2°14′06″W	1780s		
	Notes: Built at Bank Top, Piccadilly in the late 1780s by Peter Drinkwater and managed in the 1790s by Robert Owen, this cotton mill was the first in Manchester to use a stationary steam engine made by Boulton and Watt. Isaac Perrins was involved in the installation of this.				
Pin Mill		Fairfield Street, Ardwick SJ 856 976 53°28′30″N 2°13′05″W			
	Notes: 1891-John H. Gartside and Co, Limited, 905 looms				
Redhill Street Mills see McConnel and Kennedy Mills	McConnel and Kennedy Mills	Ancoats, SJ850985 53°28′59″N 2°13′41″W	1818		208
Reservoir Mill		Beswick SJ 865 987 53°29′06″N 2°12′18″W			
	Notes: 1891-Richard Johnson, 240 looms				
Rhodes Mill		SJ 857 984 53°28′55″N 2°13′01″W			
Royal Mill	McConnel and Kennedy Mills	Redhill St, Ancoats SJ 849 985 53°28′59″N 2°13′44″W	1912		114
	Notes: Grade II* listed building Part of McConnel and Kennedy Mills complex Renamed from New Old Mill after visit from HM King George, 19 November 1942.				
Salvin's Factory		Ancoats , SJ 852 984 53°28′55″N 2°13′26″W	c1788		
Sedgwick Mill	McConnel and Kennedy Mills	Redhill Street, Ancoats SJ 850 985 53°28′59″N 2°13′41″W	1818		208
	Notes: Grade II listed building Part of McConnel and Kennedy Mills complex Designed by James Lowe 8 storey, 17 bay.				
Sedgwick New Mill	McConnel and Kennedy Mills	Redhill Street, Ancoats SJ850985 53°28′59″N 2°13′41″W	1912		114
	Notes: Grade II listed building Part of McConnel and Kennedy Mills complex				
Shudehill Mill		Shudehill SJ844989 53°29′13″N 2°14′13″W	1782	1940	158
	Notes: 1940-Destroyed by bombing				
Smedley Vale Dye Works		SD850011 53°30′22″N 2°13′41″W			
	Notes: 1891-James Ashworth				
Smedley Works		SD850 012 53°30′25″N 2°13′41″W			
Soho Iron Works Site		SJ 855 983 53°28′52″N 2°13′12″W			
	Notes: A manufacturer and supplier of mill machinery, spindles and other goods to the textiles industries. The Soho Factory had many specialist manufactures within its 100 yard frontage, including machinery makers, spindle makers and calico printing machinery makers. They also supplied the dyeing, bleaching and local chemical industries, with goods and parts.				
Spectator Mill		Spectator Street, Beswick			
	Notes: Grade II listed building Silk Mill, built early to mid 19th century				
Supreme Mills		SJ 852987 53°29′06″N 2°13′30″W			
Talbot Mill		SJ 827974 53°28′23″N 2°15′43″W			
	Notes: 1891-J. and E. Waters and Co				
Ten Acres Mill		SD873 003 53°29′56″N 2°11′35″W			
	Notes: 1891-Tootal, Broadhurst and Lee Co, Ltd, 930 looms				
Thistle Mill		Harpurhey SD855 021 53°30′54″N 2°13′12″W			
	Notes: 1891-J. Paterson and Co, 245 looms				
Union Mill		SJ861 988 53°29′10″N 2°12′40″W			
	Notes: 1891-C. E. Bennett and Co, together with Bengal Mill, 16,000 spindles				
Victoria Mill	William Holland	Lower Vickers Street, Miles Platting SJ 859 993 53°29′24″N 2°12′50″W	1867, 1873		
	Notes: Grade II* listed building Alongside the Rochdale Canal and Varley Street, Victoria Mill was constructed for William Holland, of the Adelphi Mill, Salford. It was designed by George Woodhouse of Bolton. It was a six storey double mill with shared engine house. It had an octagonal chimney. In 1891, still owned by William Holland and Sons it had 170,000 spindles. It was worked to the 1960s, and has now been converted into office space and residential.				
Victoria Mills		Ancoats , SJ 856 985 53°28′59″N 2°13′05″W			
Waterside Works		SD 839 034 53°31′37″N 2°14′38″W			
Waulk Mill aka Doubling Mill/Fireproof Mill	Murray Mills	Redhill Street, Ancoats SJ 861 988 53°29′10″N 2°12′40″W	1842		184
	Notes: Grade II* listed building Part of Murrays' Mills complex				
Wellington Mill		Pollard Street, Ancoats SJ 859 987 53°29′06″N 2°12′50″W			
	Notes: 1891-Bazley Brothers, 47,350 spindles				
Wellington Mill		Newton Heath SD 866 003 53°29′56″N 2°12′11″W			
	Notes: 1891-Joseph Holt and Sons, 334 looms				
Wellington Mills		Bridgewater Street, Castlefield SJ 832 976 53°28′33″N 2°15′17″W	1912		114
	Notes:				
York Mill		SJ 845 983 53°28′52″N 2°14′06″W			

== See also ==
- List of warehouses in Manchester

== Bibliography ==
- Ashmore, Owen (1982). The industrial archaeology of North-west England. Manchester University Press. ISBN 0-7190-0820-4.
- Williams, Mike; Farnie (1992). Cotton Mills in Greater Manchester. Carnegie Publishing. ISBN 0-948789-89-1.
- Miller, Ian; Wild, Chris (2007), A & G Murray and the Cotton Mills of Ancoats, Oxford Archaeology North, ISBN 978-0-904220-46-9
- Grace's Guide. "Cotton Mills in Manchester and Salford 1891".
