= William McConnel =

- Born: 1810; Ancoats, Manchester, England
- Died: 10 October 1902 (aged 93); Colmonell, Ayrshire, Scotland
- Known for: McConnel & Kennedy Mills, Talyllyn Railway

William McConnel (1810 – 10 October 1902) (sometimes written: William McConnell) was a British industrialist and mill-owner from Lancashire, England. He founded the Aberdovey Slate Company that ran the Bryn Eglwys slate quarry from 1863 onwards and oversaw the construction of the associated Talyllyn Railway.

== Cotton mill owner ==
The McConnel family were owners of a series of large cotton spinning mills in Ancoats in the city of Manchester. The first mill, Sedgewick Mill, was built between 1818 and 1821 by the company of Messrs. McConnel & Kennedy under the chairmanship of James McConnel, William's father, and in partnership with John Kennedy. James McConnel died in 1831 and three of his sons, Henry, James and William became partners in the business. By 1833, the McConnel & Kennedy Mills were the largest importer of cotton from America, and Sedgwick Mill was one of the largest mills in operation in the United Kingdom. Henry retired from the business in 1860 and his brother James retired in 1861, leaving William as the sole owner of the mill.

The outbreak of the American Civil War in 1861 had a dramatic impact on McConnel & Kennedy. Raw cotton supplies from America were cut off, causing many Lancashire mills to sharply reduce production or close completely. Sedgwick Mill held large stocks of raw cotton and continued in limited production. By 1863, with the war continuing, McConnel was looking for other enterprises to diversify his interests away from cotton spinning.

== Slate quarry and railway owner ==
In 1859, McConnel purchased Hengwrt Hall near Dolgellau in mid Wales. His connection to Wales led him to form the Aberdovey Slate Company on 3 January 1864, to exploit the mineral resources of the district. The company leased the land on which the Bryn Eglwys slate quarry stood and took over slate extraction operations. McConnel oversaw a significant expansion of operations at the quarry. A major part of this was to construct a new railway from the quarry to the standard gauge Aberystwith and Welsh Coast Railway at Tywyn, some 7 miles away. This new railway was the narrow gauge Talyllyn Railway which opened in 1866.

Bryn Eglwys was a successful venture and continued in production until 1946. The Talyllyn Railway continued serving the local district after the closure of the quarry, and in 1951 became the first railway in the world to be taken over by volunteers and run as a heritage railway. It continues to operate as a successful tourist attraction.

== Other industrial interests ==
McConnel's desire to diversify beyond cotton led him to other industries besides slate quarrying. He owned the Deeside Ironworks at Saltney, was a director of the Amalgamated Denaby Collieres, the Newstead Colliery, Yorkshire Amalgamated Collieries Ltd. and was chairman of the Sheepbridge Coal and Iron Co. and the Tinsley Park Collieries.

== Later life ==
McConnel continued to control McConnel & Kennedy until his retirement in 1878. John Wanklyn McConnel, his eldest son, took over the business in 1880. William McConnel died in 1902.

(Margaret) Elisabeth Innes-Ker, Duchess of Roxburghe (née McConnel), daughter of Frederick Bradshaw McConnel, was his great-granddaughter. Another descendant was Diana, Duchess of Wellington, née Diana Ruth McConnel, daughter of Douglas Fitzgerald McConnel and granddaughter of William Holdsworth McConnel. Thus the present dukes of Roxburghe and Wellington are two of his descendants.
