= Alfred Herbert Dixon =

(1857–1920), British businessman

Sir Alfred Herbert Dixon
- Baronet Dixon of Warford
- Tenure: 1918-1920
- Predecessor: New creation
- Successor: Title extinct
- Born: 22 February 1857
- Died: 10 December 1920 (aged 63)
- Spouse: Caroline Sandford
- Issue: Marjorie Dixon
- Father: Henry Hall Dixon
- Mother: Caroline Lynes

Sir Alfred Herbert Dixon, 1st Baronet (22 February 1857 – 10 December 1920) was a British businessman.

== Career ==
Dixon was born the son of Henry Hall Dixon, a barrister and racing journalist, and Caroline Dixon (née Lynes). He joined A & G Murray, a cotton mill in Ancoats, as general manager in 1876. He modernised the business and used new technology. A & G Murray was "voluntarily wound up and conveyed to the Fine Cotton Spinners' and Doublers' Association Limited (FCSDA)" in September 1898. Dixon had been instrumental in founding Fine Spinners and Doublers and became its chairman and managing director. He was also President of the International Cotton Federation and represented the United Kingdom at cotton conferences in New Orleans and Zürich.

In recognition of his services during the First World War, he was created a baronet on 26 June 1918.

== Sources ==
- Miller, Ian; Wild, Chris (2007). A & G Murray and the Cotton Mills of Ancoats. Lancaster: Oxford Archaeology North. ISBN 978-0-904220-46-9.

Baronetage of the United Kingdom
New creation	Baronet (of Warford); 1918–1920	Extinct
