= Fine Spinners and Doublers =

UK business

Fine Cotton Spinners and Doublers
- Industry: Textiles
- Founded: 1898
- Defunct: 1963
- Fate: Acquired
- Successor: Courtaulds
- Headquarters: Manchester, UK

Fine Spinners and Doublers was a major cotton spinning business based in Manchester, England. At its peak it was a constituent of the FT 30 index of leading companies on the London Stock Exchange.

== History ==
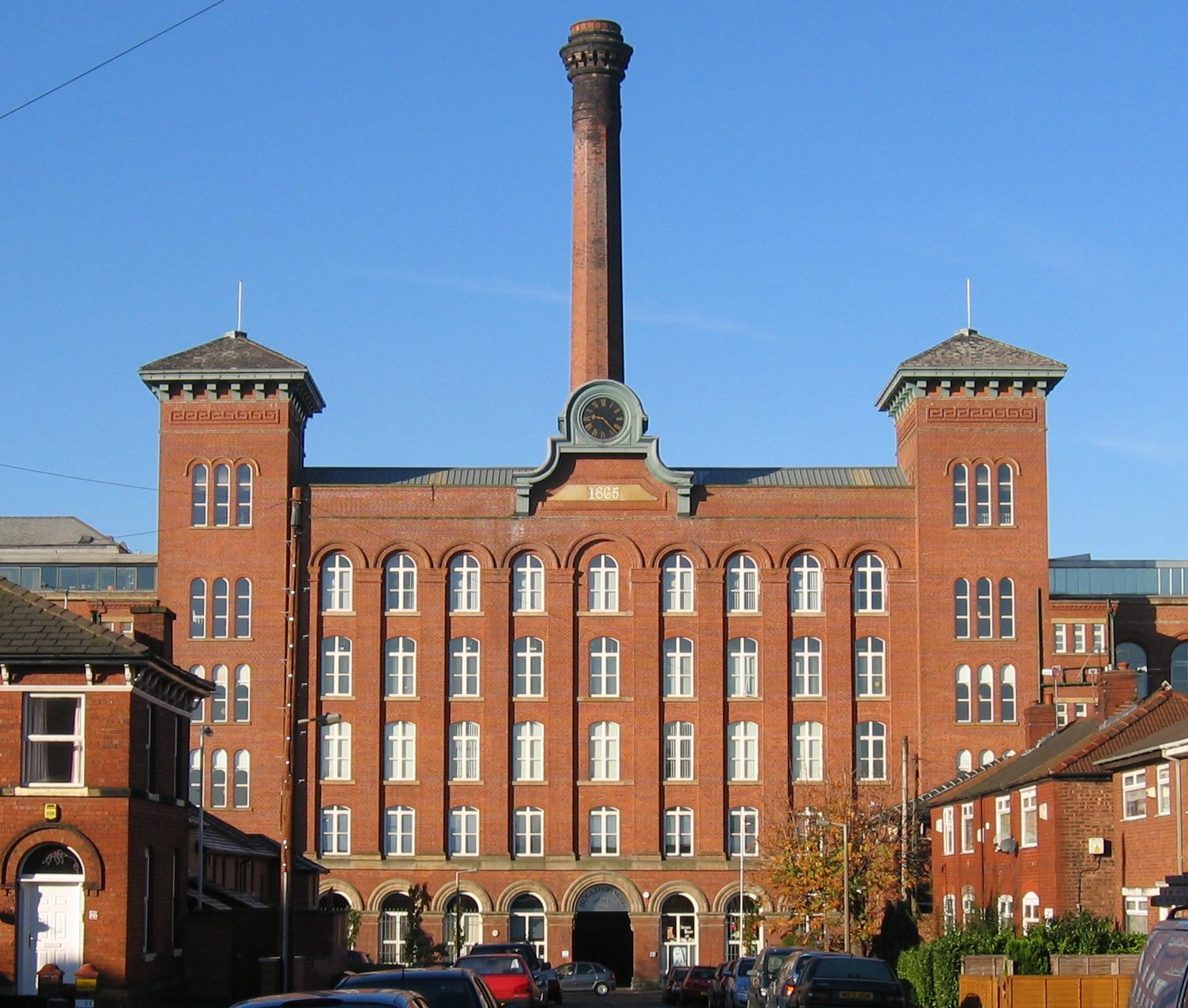
Reddish Mill, a FCSDA mill

=== Formation ===
Fine Spinners and Doublers, formed from a group of spinning companies specialising in fine Sea Island Cottons, was registered on 31 March 1898. The Fine Cotton Spinners and Doublers Association Limited had the objective of promoting the interests of cotton spinners in North West England. It was founded through the efforts of Herbert Dixon and Scott Lings in 1897. Businesses that joined in this enterprise at the time included A&G Murray Ltd, Houldsworths, CE Bennett & Co, James & Wainwright Bellhouse and McConnell & Co; but many more followed in subsequent years.

The new association was vast compared with its competitors and its large size enabled it to secure its supplies of cotton from the Sea Island and Egypt. For thirty years it was the world's largest cotton-spinning concern, expanding to operate 60 mills and employ 30,000 operatives.

=== First World War ===
In 1915, its vice-president, McConnel was on the RMS Lusitania when she was sunk by enemy action. He survived and wrote an account of the sinking which was published in the Manchester Guardian.

=== Contraction ===
In 1938 Lancashire Cotton Corporation replaced Fine Cotton Spinners and Doublers in the FT 30 as the latter completed a capital reduction and reorganisation programme.

On 16 June 1940 production was stepped up order of Lord Beaverbrook. Sunday working and double shifts were introduced in a plan to quadruple production in order to manufacture defensive barrage balloons. At peak of production 10 mills were used to output 91,000 kilograms (200,000 lb) of fine super-combed yarn a week; that is 50% of the industry total. Fine super-combed yarn was needed for parachutes and camouflage netting. It was also used for constructing pneumatic heavy lifting gear and inflatable decoy artillery.

In 1946 the name of the business was changed to Fine Spinners' and Doublers' Limited. There were 62 firms making up the Association. It owned 107 spinning and doubling mills, a pilot production plant, a weaving mill, a mercerising plant a large research establishment and a 16,000 hectares (39,000 acres) cotton plantation.

During the next five years there was a sustained boom in the textile industry owing to the worldwide shortage of cotton goods. Yarn production increased by 50 percent but output contracted by 28 percent; the Lancashire industry had collapsed.

=== Closure ===
Fine Spinners and Doublers was acquired by Courtaulds in 1963.
