= Havelock Mills =

Silk mills in central Manchester, England

- Great Bridgewater Street Mills
- Location in Greater Manchester

Silk throwing Cotton spinning
- Structural system: Fairbairn cast iron frame
- Location: Manchester, England
- Serving canal: Rochdale Canal
- Coordinates: 53.4746°N 2.2461°W

Construction
- Built: 1820, 1840
- Demolished: 1994
- Floor count: 7

Power
- Transmission type: Vertical shaft

Equipment

Listed Building – Grade II
- Designated: 31 January 1990
- Reference no.: 388155

Havelock Mills in central Manchester were built between 1820 and 1840. It was probably the largest surviving silk mill in the north-west region in the 1970s and had a unique combination of silk and cotton mills on one site. It was a landmark on the Rochdale Canal, overlooking Tib Lock, one of the Rochdale Nine.

== Location ==
The mills on the Rochdale Canal, although listed, now demolished

The mills were built on the canal side on Great Bridgewater Street. The Manchester and Salford Junction Canal was to the east, and Rochdale Canal's Tib Lock (Lock 89) was to the south.

== History ==
The mill was a large silk mill and early spinning mill. It was granted Grade II listed building status but was demolished in 1992. The site is now occupied by the Evershed Building.

Demolition of the Grade II listed building was controversial but went ahead after protests and a public inquiry. Before demolition, the developer agreed to a programme of structural tests on the building frame sponsored by English Heritage and the Department of Trade and Industry. The designer of the frame is anonymous, but it is in the style of the Manchester engineer William Fairbairn.

After demolition Joe Marsh and Tom Swaile of UMIST arranged for part of the iron frame to be re-erected on the UMIST campus. Assembly on campus was by Percival Brothers of Stockport. Another part of the frame was shipped to Paris and formed the 'gateway' piece to an exhibition at the Pompidou Centre "The Art of the Structural Engineer". (Note: Details of the test were published by Joe Marsh and Tom Swailes in Structural Appraisal of Iron-framed Textile Mills, published in 1998 by the Institution of Civil Engineers through their publishing arm Thomas Telford.)

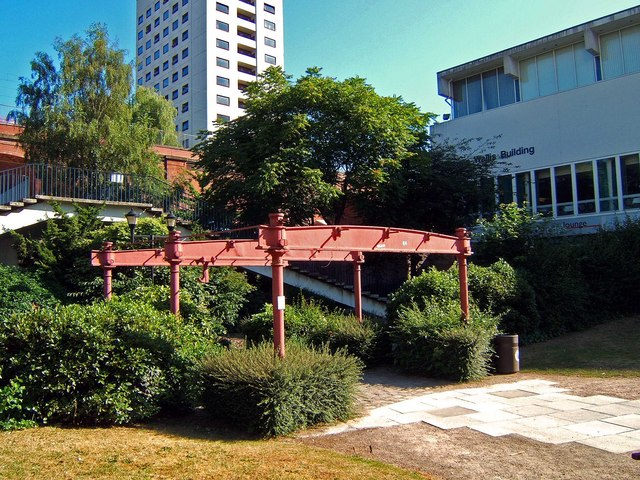
Part of the iron frame re-erected on the UMIST campus

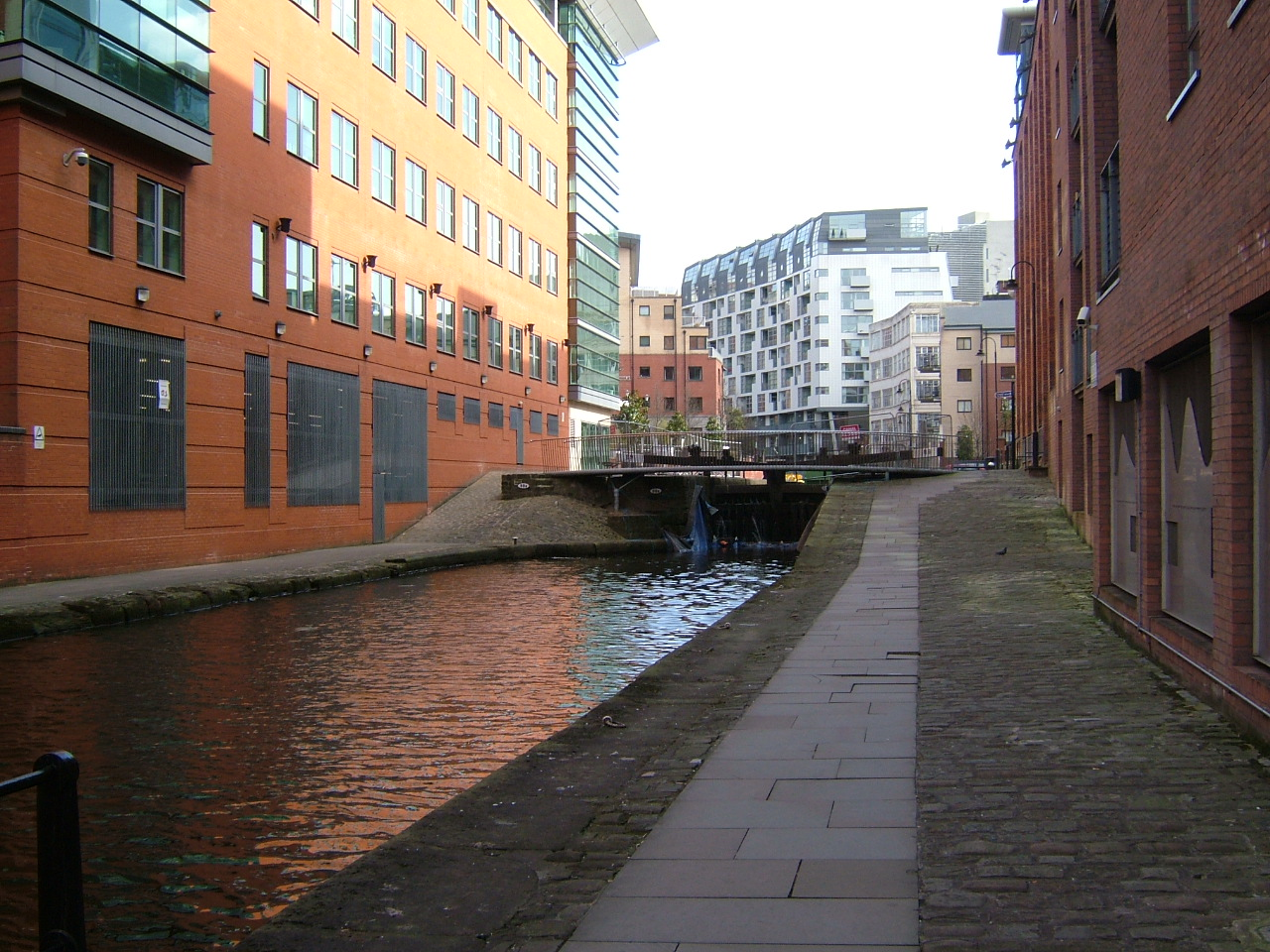
Evershed building where Havelock Mills used to be

== Architecture ==
Havelock Mills were two interlinked L-shaped multi-storey mills. They were notable in that the mill built in 1820 was a silk-mill and the second, built in 1840 was a fire-proof cotton mill.

The silk mill was of six storeys over a basement and had 18 bays facing Great Bridgewater Street (Nos 72 and 74). The windows had raised sills and wedge lintels. Three bays were blind. The doorways were round-headed with rusticated long-and-short surrounds. The 20-bay west range had segmental-headed windows with raised sills, and loading doors on most floors, the octagonal chimney was in the south-west corner. The rear of the main range had a garderobe turret (privy tower) to the right and a semi-octagonal turret in the centre.

The cotton mill was of a basement and six storeys, its 10 bays were at right angles to the street. It was 4 bays wide and attached by a two-bay link to the silk mill over the wagon entrance to the court-yard. The cotton mill was of fire-proof construction with 2 rows of cast-iron columns, and parabolic cast-iron beams carrying brick vaulting. Attached to south wall was a full-height vertical drive-shaft. The parabolic cast-iron beams were Hodgkinson beams, of the type that William Fairbairn had devised after intensive stress analysis tests carried out at the Ancoats foundry three years earlier.

The cotton mill has a fire-proofed basement boiler-house with massive cast-iron girders and stone flagged floors. Its cast-iron spiral staircase was contained in a semicircular turret at the south-west corner.

The detached engine house contained a beam engine.

== See also ==
- Textile manufacturing
