= Dixon baronets =

Baronetcy in the Baronetage of the United Kingdom

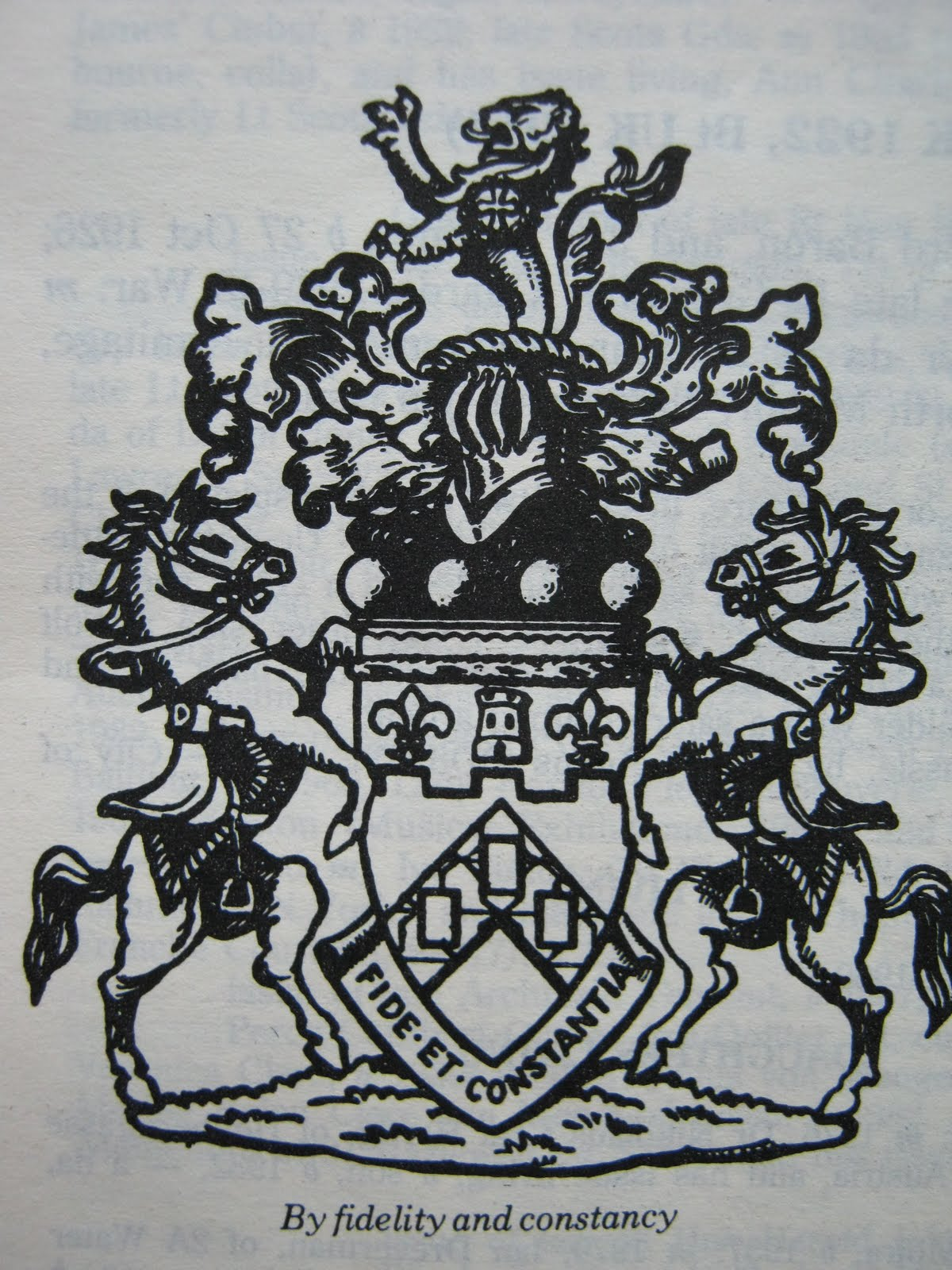
Coat of arms of the Lord Dixon of Glentoran and Ballymenock

There have been three baronetcies created for persons with the surname Dixon, all in the Baronetage of the United Kingdom.

The Dixon Baronetcy, of Ballymenock in the County of Antrim, was created in the Baronetage of the United Kingdom on 7 October 1903. For more information on this creation, see the Baron Glentoran.

The Dixon Baronetcy, of Warford in the County of Chester, was created in the Baronetage of the United Kingdom on 7 February 1918 for the cotton spinner Alfred Dixon. The title became extinct on his death in 1921.

The Dixon Baronetcy, of Astle in Chelford in the County Palatine of Chester, was created in the Baronetage of the United Kingdom on 15 May 1919 for George Dixon. He was high sheriff of Cheshire in 1881.

== Dixon baronets, of Ballymenock (1903) ==
- see the Barons Glentoran

== Dixon baronets, of Warford (1918) ==
- Sir Alfred Herbert Dixon, 1st Baronet (1857–1920) Survived by his daughter, Marjorie and widow, Caroline (Lady Dixon)

== Dixon baronets, of Astle (1919) ==
- Sir George Dixon, 1st Baronet (1842–1924)
- Sir John Dixon, 2nd Baronet (1886–1976)
- Sir John George Dixon, 3rd Baronet (1911–1990)
- Sir Jonathan Mark Dixon, 4th Baronet (born 1949)

The heir apparent to the baronetcy is Mark Edward Dixon (b. 1982), eldest son of the 4th Baronet.

== See also ==
- Dixon-Hartland baronet, of Middleton Manor (1892)
