= Star Hall =

Church in Manchester, England

Coordinates: 53.4824°N 2.2163°W

Star Hall was a Mission Hall in Ancoats, Manchester.

== History ==
The mission hall was founded by Francis Crossley (of Crossley Engines, later Crossley Motors) to meet the spiritual needs of his factory workers and opened in 1889. On his death in 1897, his daughter continued the mission until 1919. At this time the building and mission were handed over to the Salvation Army. It included the Crossley Hospital, a maternity hospital, which opened in the 1920s and continued working until at least the late 1960s, based on reports of people who were born there. See for example https://www.facebook.com/groups/wegrewupinmanchester/posts/2797932453814812/
