= Ardwick Hall =

Coordinates: 53.4712°N 2.2167°W

Ardwick Hall was a large country house set amongst grounds and conservatories on the eastern side of Ardwick Green in Manchester.

Ardwick Hall was constructed at some time before 1794, though there may have been an older Ardwick Hall which was associated with the locally prominent Birch family. The new house was originally occupied by Samuel Hyde, after his death the hall was passed on to linen merchant Robert Hyde who was the uncle of British textile mill owner Samuel Greg (1758–1834). Robert died in 1785, and the Hall was inherited by brother Nathan Hyde, who owned it until his death on 24 October 1795. It was owned in the mid-19th century by textile magnate John Kennedy.

There were large gardens in front of the Hall, which looked onto Ardwick Green. These grounds were developed in the early 20th century to form the Empire Music Hall and adjoining cinema and billiards hall. The land to the north of the Hall, abutting Dolphin Street, was developed in the late 19th century with a large factory. Ardwick Hall remained standing, hidden amongst surrounding development until the 1970s when it was demolished. Although the hall has now gone, one part of the pre-1794 house still survives as part of the adjacent factory, where a short service wing of the original house, as seen on the 1794 map of the area, remains in-situ.
