= Old Mill, Manchester =

Cotton mill in Manchester, England

Coordinates: 53°29′02″N 2°13′35″W

Old Mill
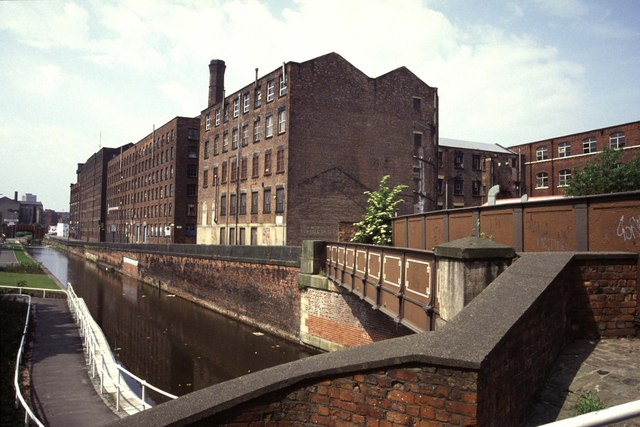
- Murrays' Mills; Old Mill is the second of the three buildings on the right
- Interactive map of Old Mill

General information
- Location: Ancoats, Manchester, England
- Completed: 1798
- Designations

Listed Building – Grade II*
- Official name: Decker Mill Old Mill
- Designated: 19 June 1988
- Reference no.: 1247473

Old Mill, completed in 1798 as part of Murrays' Mills, is the oldest surviving cotton mill in Manchester, England. Sited on the Rochdale Canal in Ancoats, it was powered by a Boulton and Watt steam engine, and its narrow six-storey brick structure "came to typify the Manchester cotton mill". Old Mill was designated a Grade II* listed building on 19 June 1988.

== Gallery ==
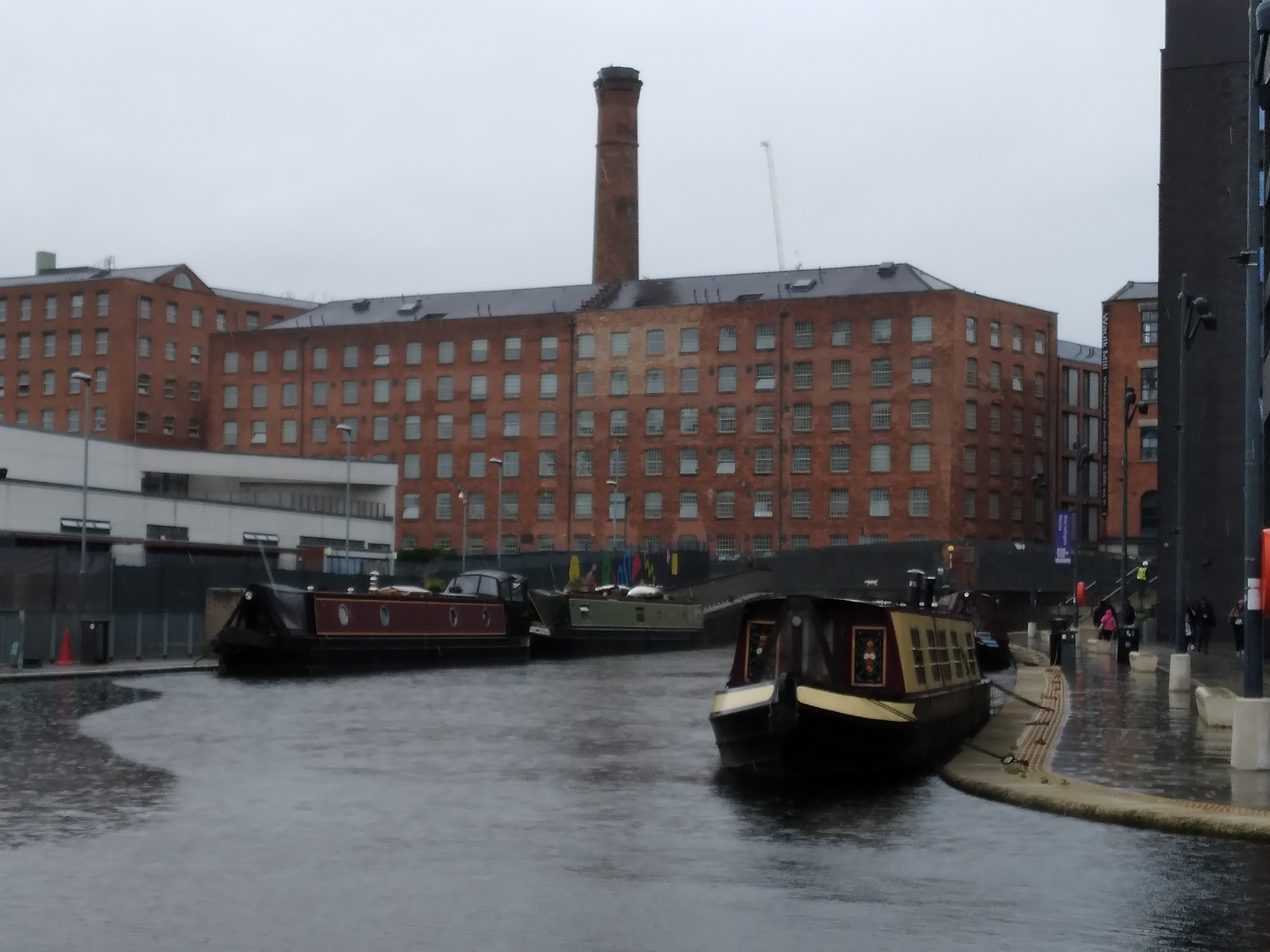
Old Mill as seen from the banks of the New Islington canal

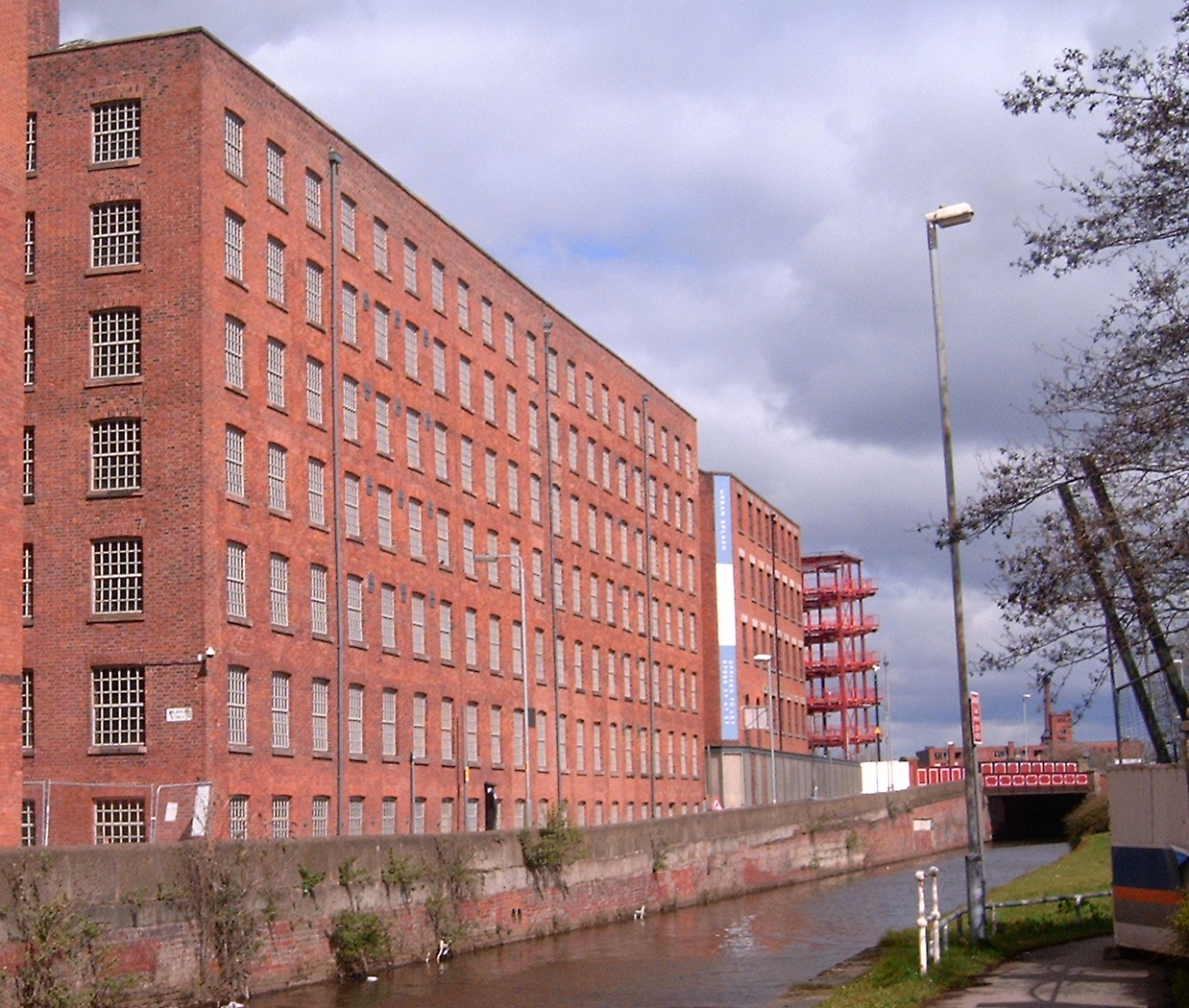
View from the south
