= Murrays' Mills =

Mill complex in Manchester, England

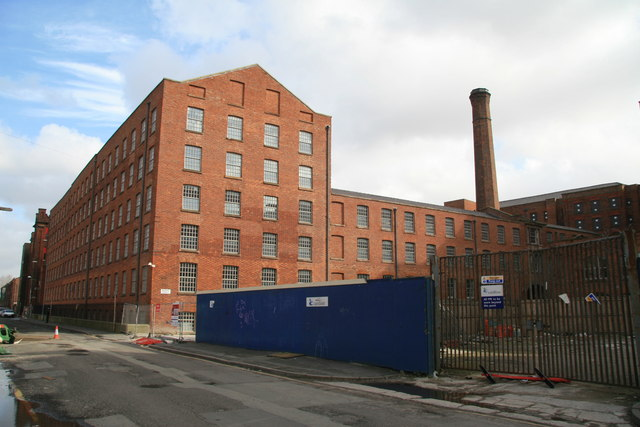
- New Mill in 2008, part of the Murrays' Mills complex.

- Location within Greater Manchester

General information
- Location: Ancoats, Manchester, England
- Coordinates: 53.4839°N 2.2267°W
- Construction started: 1797
- Client: A & G Murray

Technical details
- Size: 13,000 m^{2} (140,000ft²)

Murrays' Mills is a complex of former cotton mills on land between Jersey Street and the Rochdale Canal in Ancoats, an area of Manchester, England. The mills were built for brothers Adam and George Murray.

The first mill on the site, Old Mill, was begun in 1797, and is the world's oldest surviving urban steam-powered cotton spinning factory. After Old Mill opened, the company continued to expand and prosper, and by 1806 the complex was the largest in the world, employing about 1,000 people at its peak: Decker Mill was opened in 1802, New Mill in 1804, Little Mill in 1822, and Doubling and Fireproof Mill in 1842. The main complex formed a quadrangle surrounding a private canal basin linked under the road to the Rochdale Canal, which opened in 1804. The canal basin was used to deliver raw cotton and coal and to transport spun cotton away from the complex.

In 1898 A & G Murray became part of the Fine Cotton Spinners' and Doublers' Association Limited (FCSDA). The mill complex began to decline in the early 20th century as the canal basin was filled in and Little Mill burnt down. The mill was replaced with the earliest mill in Greater Manchester that was built to use mains electricity. The mill complex continued producing cotton until the 1950s. The mills were later leased out to other companies and in some cases allowed to fall into disrepair. Between 2000 and 2003, Urban Splash redeveloped Fireproof and Doubling Mill into offices, winning a RIBA Award. The rest of the complex underwent a £17 million regeneration between 2004 and 2006 and are proposed to be used as flats and a hotel.

== History ==
=== Foundation and establishment ===
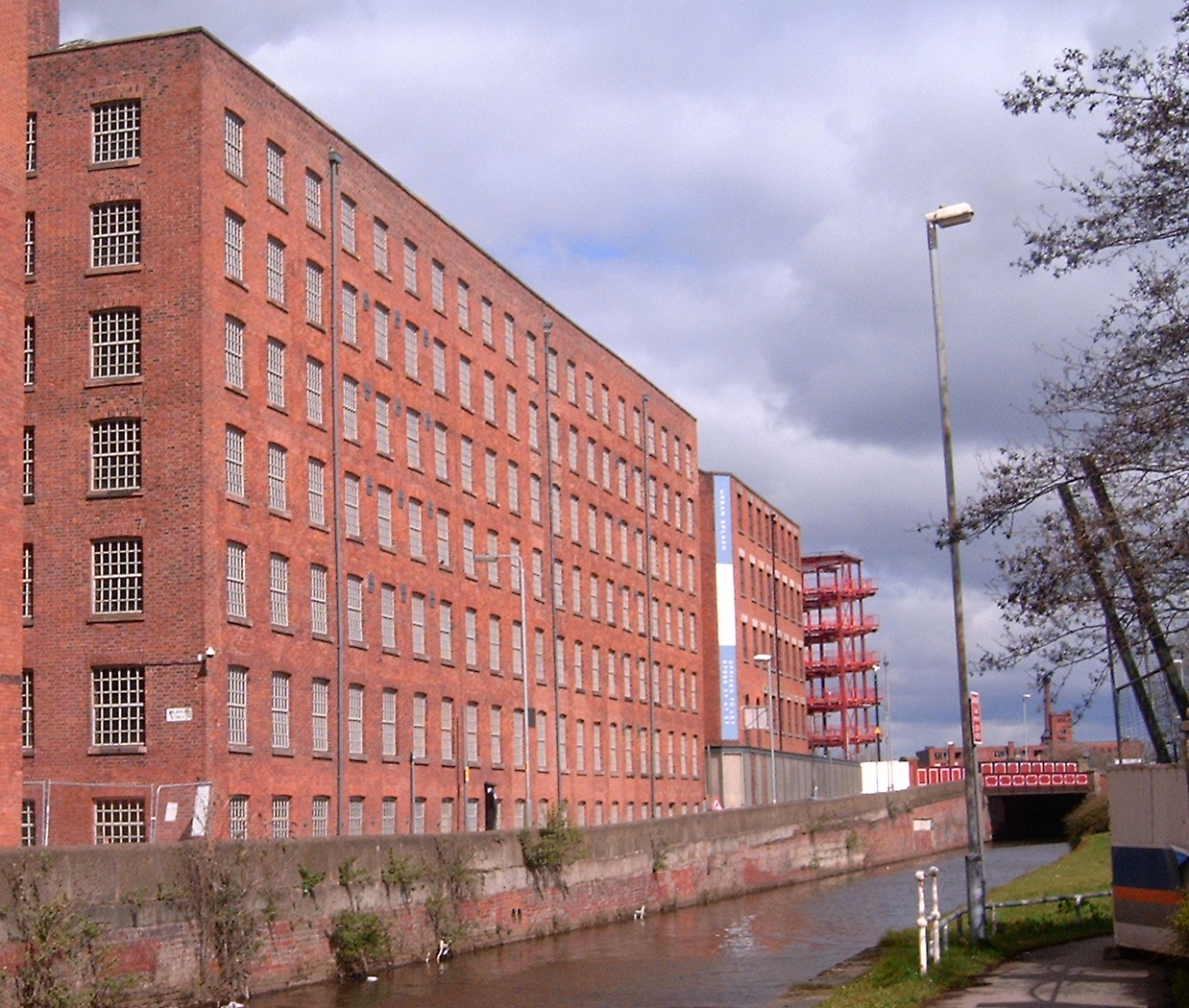
Old and Decker Mills standing above the canal. Doubling Mill is also visible to the rear.

After migrating from Scotland in the 1780s, the Murrays established themselves as manufacturers of textile machinery before moving into spinning fine yarn. In the late 18th and early 19th centuries the main market for Murrays' fine spun yarn was the muslin-weaving industry in Scotland; along with McConnel & Kennedy, A & G Murray dominated the Scottish market. In 1790, Adam Murray leased land in Ancoats; in partnership with his brother George, began construction of his first mill – which was complete by about 1798.

The mill was probably designed to house equipment produced by the Murray brothers themselves. First known as Union Mill, from its position on Union Street, the Old Mill was a purpose-built steam-powered spinning mill. Construction took approximately a year and millwright Thomas Lowe – who had worked on Richard Arkwright's first two factories – planned the building. It is eight storeys high and probably the first cotton-spinning factory to have been built that high. The first phase of the mill, an area of 105 feet (32 m) by 42 feet (13 m), was built of 400,000 locally made bricks. The machinery was powered by a 12 horse power (hp), £620 Boulton and Watt steam engine.

Construction of the Murrays' second mill, Decker Mill, had begun by 1801 to the east of Old Mill. It was the same height as Old Mill and doubled the size of the complex. Decker Mill was completed in time to exploit the economic boom in the cotton trade that followed the brief peace in the war with France from 1802 to 1803. During its construction, the steam engine was replaced a more powerful 40 hp Boulton and Watt engine.

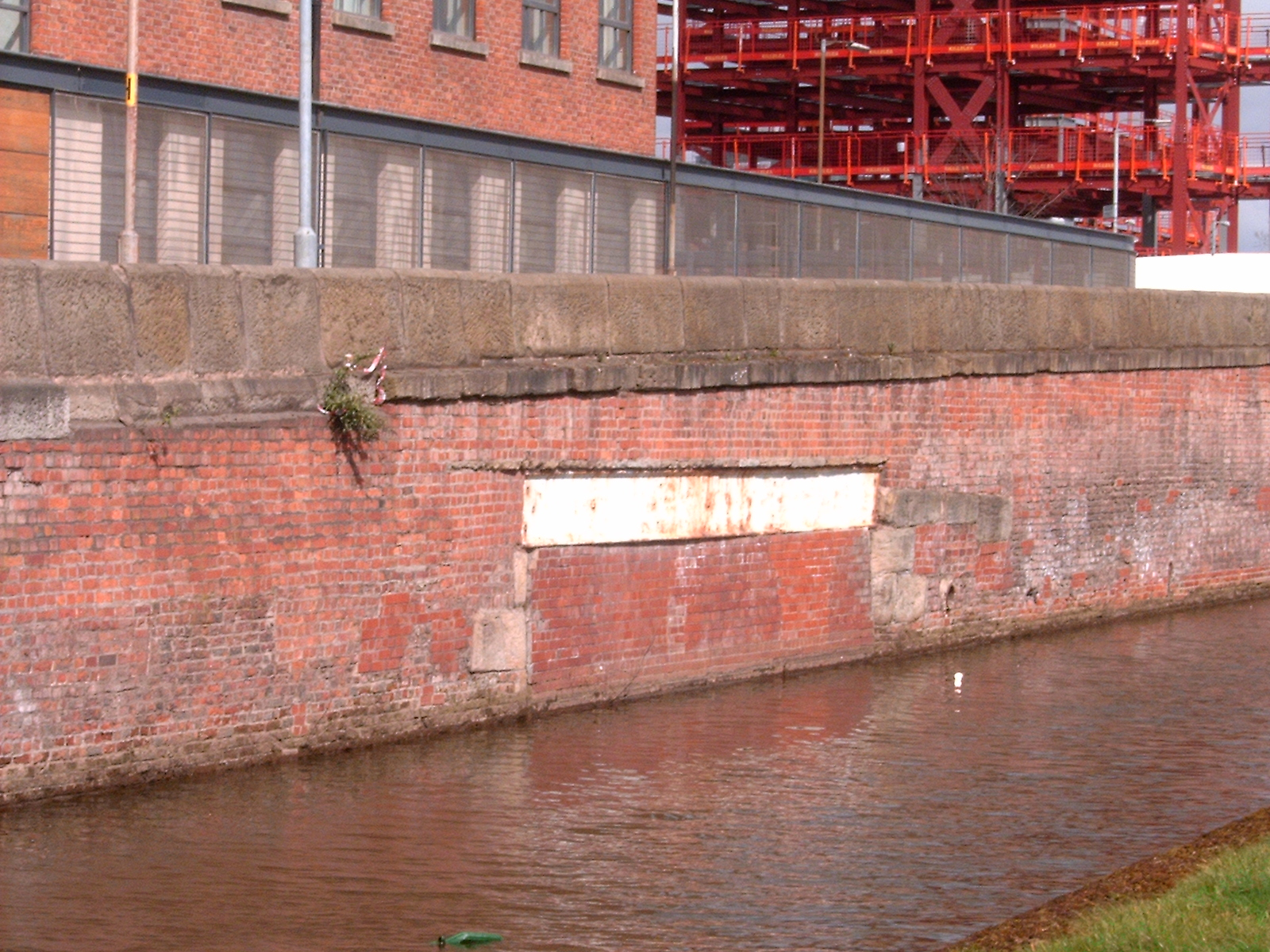
The bricked up entrance to the basin on the Rochdale Canal, which shows the tight angle for navigation

After the completion of the Ancoats section of the Rochdale Canal in 1804, raw materials no longer had to be moved by cart. Coal and cotton could be moved directly into the complex and there was a readily available supply of water for the steam engines from the private basin on the canal. The entrance tunnel to the basin was set 90° to the canal, with a short arm on the opposite side; and as the canal is only 14 feet (4.3 m) wide, it posed navigation problems for canal boats, which could be 70 feet (21 m) in length. It is possible that cargo was transferred to smaller vessels for the journey between the canal and the complex basin.

Construction of New Mill was probably completed in 1804. It measured 193 feet (59 m) by 46 feet (14 m) and as with the older mills, it was eight storeys high. It was fitted with a 45 hp steam engines from Boulton and Watt. All three mills were steam-power cotton-spinning factories.

The complex was further extended with the addition of two four-storey blocks on Murray Street and Bengal Street by 1806. These were mainly used as warehouses and offices. An entrance archway in the Murray Street block provided the only access to a central courtyard where the mills had their entrances. This meant that access to all parts of the site could be controlled.

By 1806 the Murrays' Mills was the largest mill complex in Manchester and the world. With 84,000 mule spindles the complex was huge compared to others at the time, most of which had less than 10,000 spindles. The status of the complex was reflected in the amount of ornamentation on the Murray Street and Bengal Street blocks compared to other mills. The Murray Street block had a symmetrical arrangement of arched doorways and windows. This pattern was in turn mirrored on the Bengal Street block, which had an arrangement of false doorways.

A & G Murray prospered during the early 19th century, and in 1809 the firm was valued at £20,456: 13% more than their nearest rival, McConnel & Kennedy, and more than double the firm in third place. The company was "one of the largest cotton-spinning firms in Manchester, and probably the country". By 1815, it employed 1,215 people.

=== Expansion ===
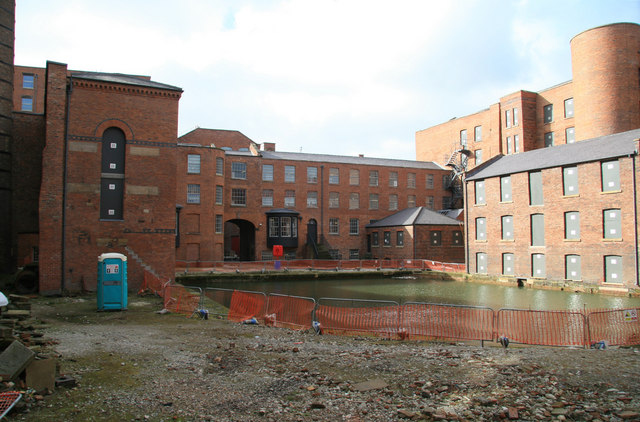
The interior of the quadrangle of Murrays' Mills. In the foreground is the private basin attached to the Rochdale Canal.

During the early to mid-19th century there were several periods of depression and prosperity in the cotton trade. In this period, A & G Murray would have been less affected by these changes due to the size of the firm. In 1817 engineers William Fairbairn and his partner James Lillie updated the complex. The contract, Fairbairn's first as a millwright, involved the replacement of line shafting in the complex, with wrought iron line-shafting designed to work at higher speeds. Adam Murray died in 1818 and his brother George continued to run the firm. By 1818, the firm had nearly tripled in value since 1809 to £59,000.

Additionally, the firm also expanded beyond Bengal Street further along the strip of land between Jersey Street and the Rochdale Canal. Little Mill was built on the corner of Jersey Street and Bengal Street around 1822. It was originally six storeys high, but an additional three storeys were added at an unknown later date. The building covered 644 square metres (6,930 sq ft) and just over half of this area would have been occupied by a gasometer house which would have supplied the complex with gas used for lighting. The mill was linked to New Mill via a tunnel which may have carried the gas supply. Engineer Joshua Field visited the mill in 1821 and commented "they spin the finest thread". He also noted that the furnace which provided steam to drive the engines had been fitted with a "smoke burner" to "lessen the consumption of fuel", also having the effect of reducing the amount of smoke produced.

Despite the continued expansion, by 1824 competitors McConnel and Kennedy had overtaken the Murrays as Manchester's biggest cotton spinners. In 1833 A & G Murray were employing only 841 people, a reduction in workforce George Murray attributed to "recent improvement in the firm's machinery".

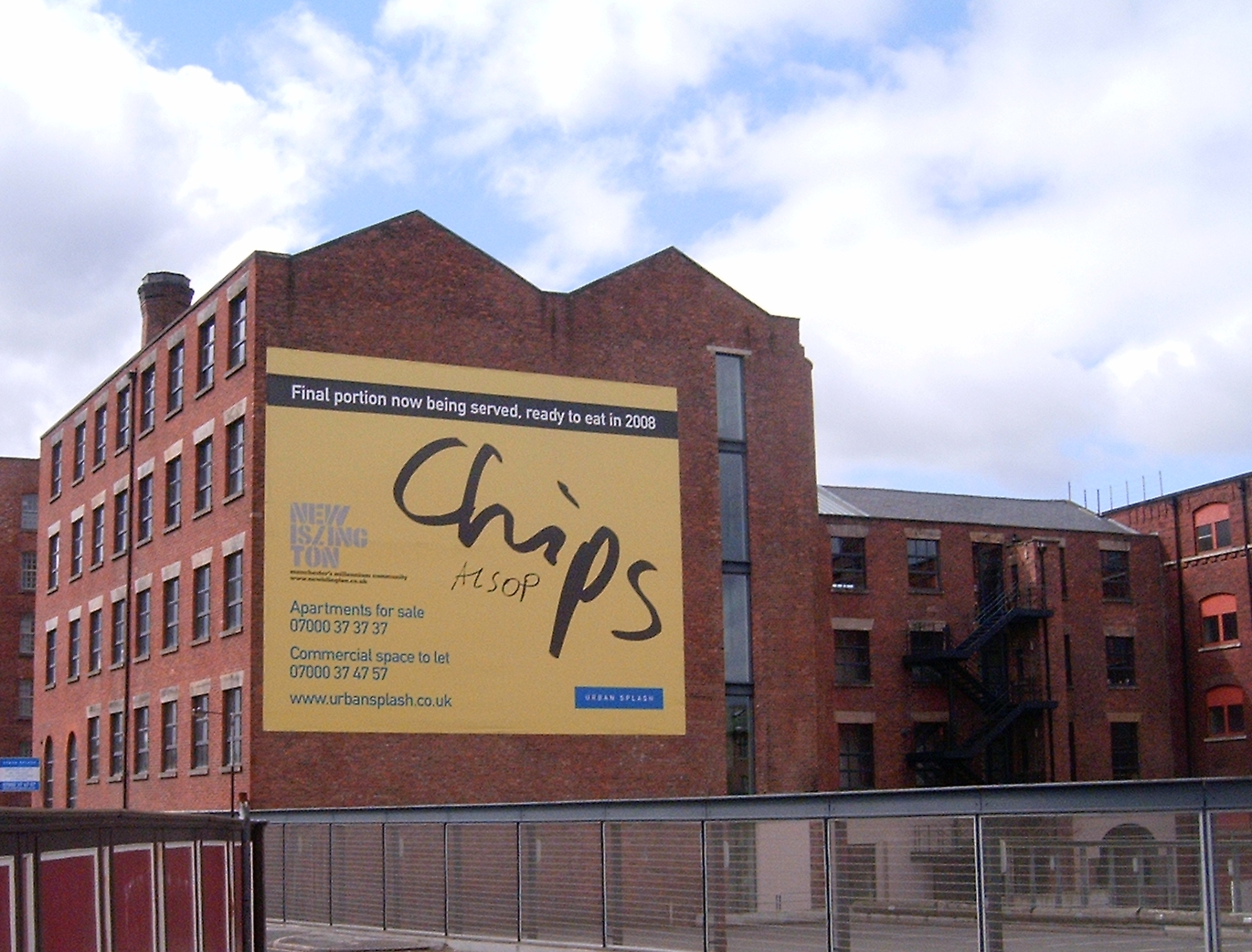
Doubling Mill (left foreground) and Fireproof Mill (right background)

In 1842 Doubling Mill and Fireproof Mill were built on the corner of Redhill Street and Bengal Street. Doubling Mill is five storeys high with an engine house designed to contain a 40 hp beam engine. Doubling Mill was used for doubling – the process of combining two or more lengths of yarn into a single thread – cotton produced in the company's earlier mills, giving the mill its name. Fireproof Mill, again as its name suggests, was designed to be fireproof by using cast-iron beams and columns rather than timber; it was the first mill in the mill complex to have been built to resist fire. The mill is four storeys high and may have been used as a warehouse. The two new mills were also linked to the original complex by tunnels under Bengal Street. The firm "doubled more or less" in size during the early to mid 19th century and expanded into the fine yarn markets around Nottingham, the growth of the firm led to the creation of the Doubling and Fireproof Mills.

In December 1852, the mill complex was valued at £75,000; when George Murray died in 1855, two of his three sons – James and Benjamin – inherited the complex. By 1881, A & G Murray had become registered as a limited liability company and the running of it was mostly in the hands of manager Herbert Dixon, who had joined the company in 1876, as the Murray family played less of a role. Under Dixon the company modernised and used new technology and was the reason for the firm's continued success. The use of new, more efficient technologies resulted in the further reduction of the workforce so that by 1897, A & G Murray only employed 500 people. In 1887 Fireproof Mill and Doubling Mill were leased by A & G Murray Ltd to C. E. Bennet.

In September 1898, A & G Murray was "voluntarily wound up and conveyed to the Fine Cotton Spinners' and Doublers' Association Limited (FCSDA)". The association had been an idea on the part of Dixon and Scott Lings to form an association of cotton spinners. Thirty-one other cotton spinners also joined the association. The association had the advantage of great size in comparison to the competition, and had the necessary clout to secure raw materials. With Dixon as its managing director until 1917, by the 1920s, the FCSDA was the largest and most successful cotton-spinning association in the world with over 60 mills and 30,000 employees.

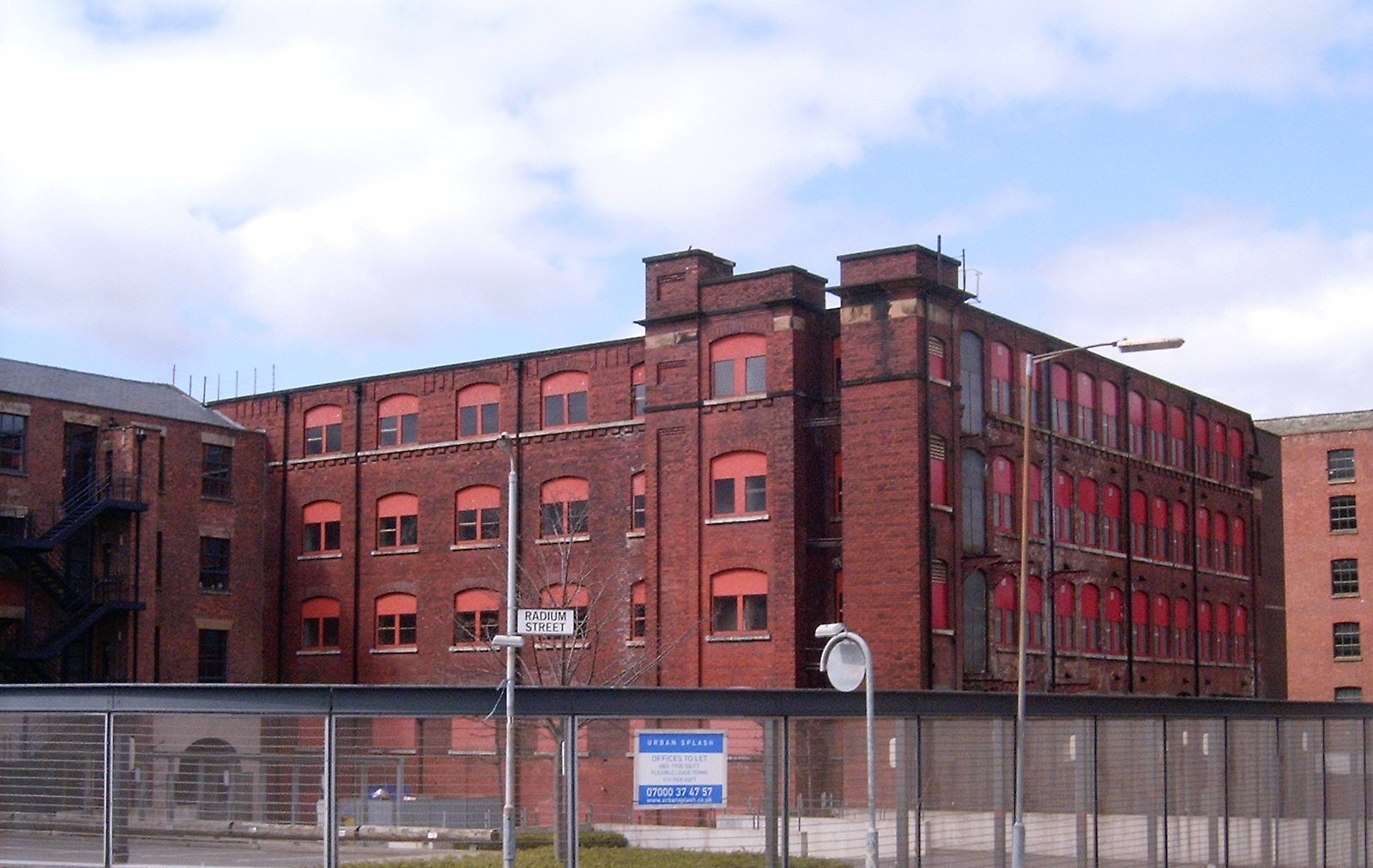
The 1908 New Little Mill replaced the previous Little Mill from 1822.

On 28 January 1908, a fire broke out in Little Mill, caused by some machinery. The fire lasted for about 12 hours and caused an estimated £20,000 damage and resulted in 200 employees at the mill losing their jobs. Whilst fighting the fire a fireman was killed when a fire-tender blew over in high winds. The building was replaced by a new building, New Little Mill, five storeys high, four shorter than its predecessor but occupying a larger area of ground. The new mill had concrete floors and was designed to use mains electricity. The building is the earliest mill in Greater Manchester that was built to use mains electricity.

=== Decline and later use ===
An 1891 Ordnance Survey map shows that the arm on the Rochdale Canal had been filled in and the complex's canal basin had been retitled as a reservoir, suggesting that the canal had ceased to be used as a way of transporting goods to and from the complex. By 1902, the canal basin had been filled in, however exactly when it was filled in is unknown.

Between 1902 and 1903, Old and Decker Mills were reduced in height by one storey to seven storeys and New Mill was reduced in height by two storeys to six storeys. The exact reason for this reduction is unknown, however, it is speculated that the structure of the buildings was struggling to cope with the weight of increasingly heavy machinery. This theory is given added weight by the fact that at around the same time the timber beams used to support ceilings were replaced with steel beams to strengthen the building. In 1930 the Bengal Street block was also reduced in height by two storeys and buttresses were constructed against the south wall of Decker Mill.

By the 1940s Fireproof Mill and Doubling Mill were occupied by a bedding manufacturer. In 1948 the break-up of the main site began with Old Mill and Decker Mill being sold, with the Murray Street block following in 1950, and the Bengal Street block in 1960. Old and Decker Mill were used as a warehouse after 1954 and later used by several clothing manufacturers.

Although some work was done to strengthen the structure in the 1960s, the complex was allowed to fall into disrepair. Also during the 1960s, some sections of the complex began to be left unoccupied and others burned down including an engine block. During this period, parts of the complex were used for light industrial use before they too fell into disuse. In the 1990s, the buildings fell victim to vandalism and arson that threatened to destroy what remained of the site.

== Redevelopment ==
In 2000 Total Architecture appointed Urban Splash to convert Fireproof and Doubling Mill into office space. On completion in 2003, the conversion received a RIBA Award.

The North West Development Agency used a compulsory purchase order to take control of the main site in 2003. This allowed the Heritage Lottery Fund to give a grant of over £7 million towards the restoration of the complex. Together with an additional grant from the North West Development Agency, a £10 million regeneration project took place between 2004 and 2006. The project included repair and strengthening of the structure, the restoration of the canal basin, a new roof and windows, and the reinstatement of two missing floors from the Murray Street block.

On completion of the repairs, there have been further proposals to bring the complex back into use by converting it into flats and a hotel. The conversion, including the replacement of the demolished Bengal Street block, was expected to start in 2007 or 2008 and take three years. However, in July 2008 it emerged that due to the state of the housing market, developer Inpartnership wanted to amend planning consent for the development, replacing plans for flats in Old and Decker Mills with office space.

Manchester Life Development Corporation – a joint venture between Manchester City Council and Abu Dhabi Group - took over the site in 2013. They employed Feilden Clegg Bradley Studios to renovate the existing historic buildings with the aim of turning 'the first industrial neighbourhood in the world' into a lively residential neighbourhood.

Wing Mill, which had been destroyed by fire in the 1990s was replaced by a new-build block, and the historic mill buildings were converted into 124 apartments and a townhouse in the former engine house building, set around a courtyard garden.

== Working conditions ==
Like many factories of the 19th century, the complex was not without criticism for its working conditions. Although George Murray would not reveal working hours in the complex, it is likely that up until 1825 the workers had a similar work requirement as the 72-hour week demanded of workers at the neighbouring McConnel Kennedy complex. After 1825, the Cotton Mills, etc. Act 1825 reduced this to 69 hours – 12 hours per day on Monday to Friday and 9 hours on a Saturday. These hours were worked by all but the youngest employees.

The workers were allowed three breaks per day. In order to stop employees wandering off and taking breaks that they were not entitled to, tunnels were built under the road between the main complex and the later mills on the other side of Bengal Street.

The worst conditions in the mill were experienced by those at the bottom end of the pay-scale. The first stage of unpacking the raw cotton and cleaning out impurities, which was carried out by unskilled workers, produced large amounts of dust that was both a health hazard and serious fire risk. A visitor to the complex in 1832 described the dust as "almost suffocating".

On the spinning floors, the spinning process required a warm humid environment. George Murray stated that they tried to keep temperatures at around 24 °C (75 °F). Spinners were regarded as craftsmen, and they were paid by the amount they produced. They were also left to recruit, train and pay their own assistants. These assistants were often children, and consisted of "piecers" who rejoined broken threads and mule scavengers who cleaned the machinery. Child labour was generally considered by mill managers to be an important way of securing a skilled adult work force.

Compared to other trades, wages in cotton mills were relatively high. In 1833 the average earnings of an employee at the complex was 12 shillings (60p) per week, which compared favourably with other mills. However, unlike some other mill owners the Murrays did not give employees credit to buy goods from company-owned stores, or provide housing for employees beyond key workers.

Evidence suggests that conditions were better than in some other mills. The complex had opening windows, and an extra room per floor for workers to wash. The third break of the day, in the afternoon, was also a luxury that many workers in other mills did not receive. Furthermore, the Murrays also said that, unlike many other mill owners, they did not use pauper children from workhouses, or knowingly employ children under the age of nine, although George Murray conceded that some parents did employ their own children below that age.

== Current buildings ==
Name	Completed	Listed	Location	Notes	Ref(s)
Decker Mill	1802	Grade II*	Redhill Street	Listed with Old Mill. Decker Mill was listed on the Buildings at Risk Register, rating its condition as "poor" but was renovated in 2019	
Doubling Mill and Fireproof Mill	1842	Grade II*	Redhill Street	Also known as Waulk Mill	
New Little Mill	1908	Grade II	Jersey Street	Replaced earlier mill from around 1820. The earliest mill in Greater Manchester that was built to use mains electricity.	
New Mill	1804	Grade II*	Jersey Street	New Mill was listed on the Buildings at Risk Register, rating its condition as "poor" but was renovated in 2019	
Old Mill	1798	Grade II*	Redhill Street	Listed with Decker Mill. Is the earliest surviving mill in Manchester. Also known as Union Mill. Old Mill was listed on the Buildings at Risk Register, rating its condition as "poor" but was renovated in 2019	
Warehouse and office block	1806	Grade II	Murray Street		
Wing Mill	2019		Bengal Street		

== See also ==
- Beehive Mill
- Cottonopolis
- Grade II* listed buildings in Greater Manchester
- Royal Mill
