= John Kennedy (manufacturer) =

Scottish textile industrialist

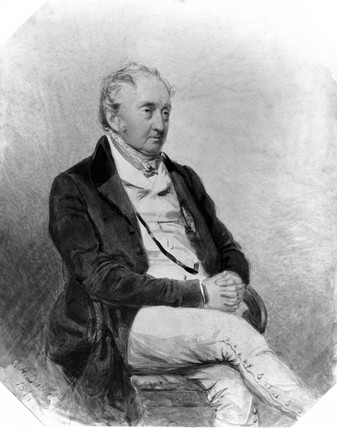
- by Charles Allen Duval, 1844
- Born: 4 July 1769; Knocknalling, Kirkcudbrightshire
- Died: 30 October 1855 (aged 86); Ardwick Hall, Manchester
- Occupations: Engineer; Textile machine maker Cotton spinner Textile industrialist
- Known for: The Jack Frame; Double Speed spinning machinery Sedgewick Mill; Rainhill locomotive trials

John Kennedy (4 July 1769 – 30 October 1855) was a Scottish textile industrialist in Manchester.

== Early life ==
John Kennedy was born in 1769 in Knocknalling, Kirkcudbrightshire, Scotland. In 1784 he moved to Chowbent, near Leigh in Lancashire, to be apprenticed to William Cannan, the son of a neighbour of the Kennedys. His training covered the manufacture of textile machinery including carding engines, jennies, and water frames. On the completion of his apprenticeship in 1791, he moved to Manchester and went into a long-lasting partnership with James McConnel, a nephew and former apprentice of Cannan, to manufacture textile machinery and undertake cotton spinning. Benjamin and William Sandford provided the financial backing. Kennedy was a skilled and inventive engineer and is credited with devising a crucial improvement to fine-spinning machinery, called double speed, which enabled much finer thread to be manufactured.

== Career ==
In 1795 McConnel and Kennedy, now financially independent, moved to a new factory in the same Canal Street, where they remained for six or seven years. Initially the firm made cotton-spinning machinery for sale, but this part of the business ended around 1800. Then they built the first of their three spinning mills in Union Street (now Redhill Street) in Ancoats, Manchester which formed the basis of Kennedy's working life for the next thirty years. The Sedgewick Mill was eight stories high and the largest cast iron framed building in the world. The spinning of yarn, the most profitable activity in the cotton trade, became the company's sole activity and it became the largest such business in Manchester, concentrating on producing the highest quality yarn.

Kennedy spent much of his later life pursuing his technical and mechanical interests. He was consulted about the Liverpool and Manchester Railway, for which he was a leading advocate. He was also appointed a judge, together with the steam engineers John Urpeth Rastrick, a locomotive engineer of Stourbridge and Nicholas Wood, a mining engineer from Killingworth, at the Rainhill locomotive trials in 1829. He was an active member of the Manchester Literary and Philosophical Society and had four papers published in the transactions of the society on various industrial and social issues.

== Death ==
Kennedy died in 1855 at Ardwick Hall, Manchester, and was buried at the nearby Rusholme Road cemetery. He was succeeded by several children, including barrister John L. Kennedy.

== See also ==
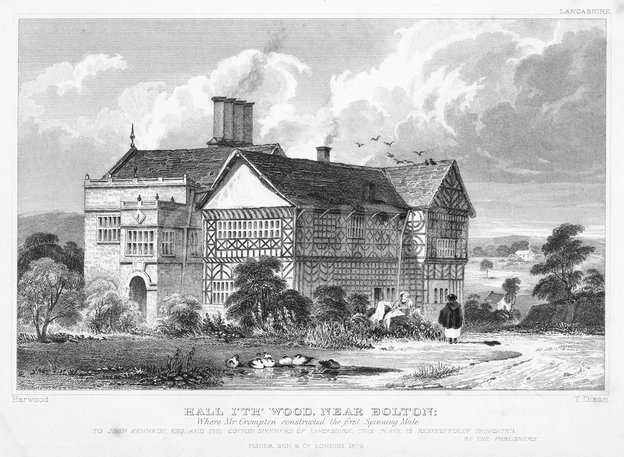
Hall i' th' Wood near Bolton; where Mr. Crompton constructed the first spinning mule. To John Kennedy, Esq. and the Cotton-Spinners of Lancashire, this plate is respectfully dedicated, by the publishers. Fisher, Son and Co. London 1829. Engraving by Thomas Dixon after a drawing by John Harwood. Originally published in William Henry Pyne's partwork Lancashire Illustrated, from Original Drawings (1828-1831).

- Samuel Crompton
