= The Baby Namboos =

British trip hop band

The Baby Namboos were a 1990s British trip hop band. One of their members, Mark Porter, is the cousin of Tricky, whose label imprint 'Durban Poison' released their debut album (the first non-Tricky release). Tricky also contributed vocals to three tracks.

Their song "Late Night Antics" inspired a New Jersey rock band to call themselves Mister Behavior, a persona mentioned in the song.

== Members ==
- Julian Brooks
- Leo Coleing
- Mark Porter
- Claude Williams
- Aurora Borealis (Zoe Bedeaux)

== Discography ==
=== Albums ===
- Ancoats 2 Zambia (1999)
