= Beehive Mill =

Cotton mill in Manchester, England

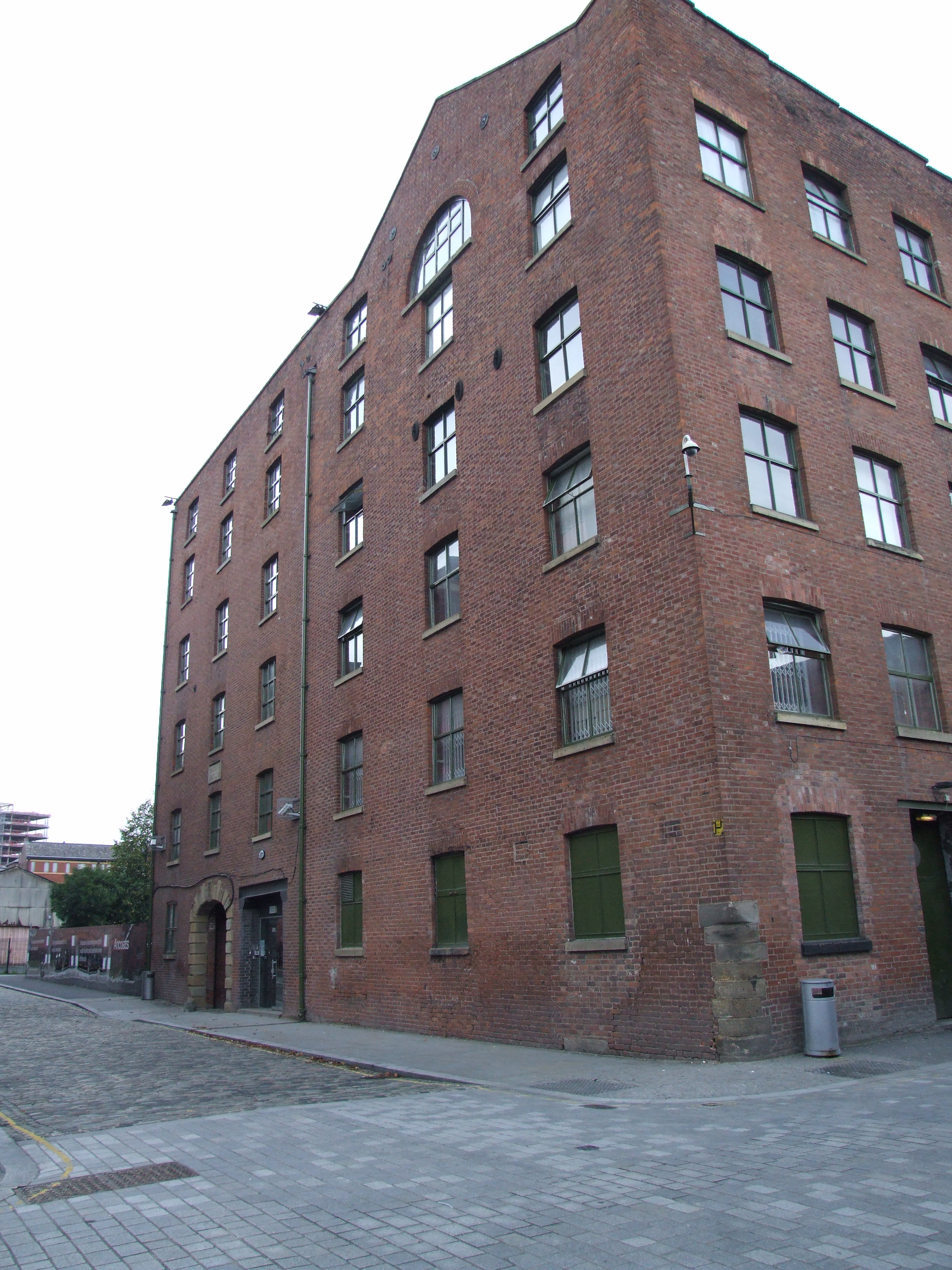
- The 1820, and 1824 blocks of Beehive Mill

- Location in Greater Manchester

Room and power spinning mill
- Architectural style: Fireproof
- Location: Jersey Street, Ancoats, Manchester, England
- Serving canal: Rochdale Canal
- Current owners: Urban Splash
- Current tenants: Beehive Lofts
- Coordinates: 53.4850°N 2.2260°W

Construction
- Built: 1820, 1824, 1847
- Renovated: 1:2018
- Floor count: 5
- Main contractor: Quay Contract Management Ltd.

Design team
- Architect: Maurice Shapiro

Equipment

Listed Building – Grade II*
- Official name: Beehive Mill
- Designated: 11 November 1988
- Reference no.: 1291735

Beehive Mill is a Grade II* listed former cotton mill on Jersey Street in Ancoats, an area of Manchester, England. Built in three phases between the early 1820s and 1847, it includes an 1824 warehouse noted for its early fireproof construction and its rare prefabricated cast and wrought‑iron roof. Later additions along Bengal Street were altered following a fire in 1861, and part of the complex was again lost to fire in 2005. The mill has since seen varied uses, including as a filming location and, more recently, as offices and coworking space.

== History ==
The building was constructed in three phases, the first two in the early 1820s and the third in 1847. The second phase, built in 1824 and used for warehousing, is an important example of early fireproof construction. The roof of the 1824 warehouse at Beehive Mill is the only known surviving example in Manchester of an advanced prefabricated mill roof made from cast and wrought iron. The third phase, a five-storey block along Bengal Street, was damaged by fire and partially rebuilt in 1861, with the estimated cost of the damage being £25,000.

On 11 November 1988, Beehive Mill was designated a Grade II* listed building.

In 2002, the upper floor of the building was used as a filming location for 24 Hour Party People, where it represented the Factory Records offices.

The adjoining Bengal Street block was destroyed by fire in July 2005. The fire threatened the rest of the complex, which housed Sankeys nightclub and offices, and water was pumped from the nearby Rochdale Canal to help extinguish it. The site has since been redeveloped for residential use.

In 2017, Beehive Mill was sold to Urban Splash and has since been redeveloped as offices and a luxury coworking space.

== Architecture ==
The earliest part of the complex is a tall, L‑shaped block built of brick, with six floors and a long frontage of 13 bays facing Radium Street and a shorter three‑bay wing towards Jersey Street. A further mill of five storeys and 13 bays was added on Bengal Street around 1848. The original block has small arched windows in each bay, including six in the gable returns. The attic is lit by three windows on the north side and a single arched opening to the south.

Inside, the structure combines cast iron and timber. Cast‑iron columns carry broad timber beams and thick floorboards, and the attic roof is formed with curved iron ribs supporting timber rafters. This upper level was also part of the powered working space. A beam engine house stood near the north end, divided by a cross wall containing a vertical shaft that created a separate northern compartment. The original circular stair, built around a chimney that has since been removed, was also positioned on this axis, with loading doors on each floor in this section.

The wing on Jersey Street dates from 1824 and was likely intended for storage. It has three bays, with a central arched entrance leading into the yard and small arched windows in each bay. Each floor originally had paired loading doors, though these have since been altered. Inside, cast‑iron columns support a grid of iron beams carrying stone‑flagged floors, and the roof is formed with iron trusses strengthened by wrought iron ties.

The adjoining block on Bengal Street was added in 1848 and partly rebuilt after a fire in 1861. It has four storeys and 13 bays. On the rear elevation, the bays are divided by narrow, full‑height projections resembling pilasters, which may have been part of an early heating or ventilation system.

== See also ==
- Grade II* listed buildings in Greater Manchester
- Listed buildings in Manchester-M4
