= Ancoats =

Area of Manchester, Greater Manchester, England

Coordinates: 53.483333°N 2.229722°W

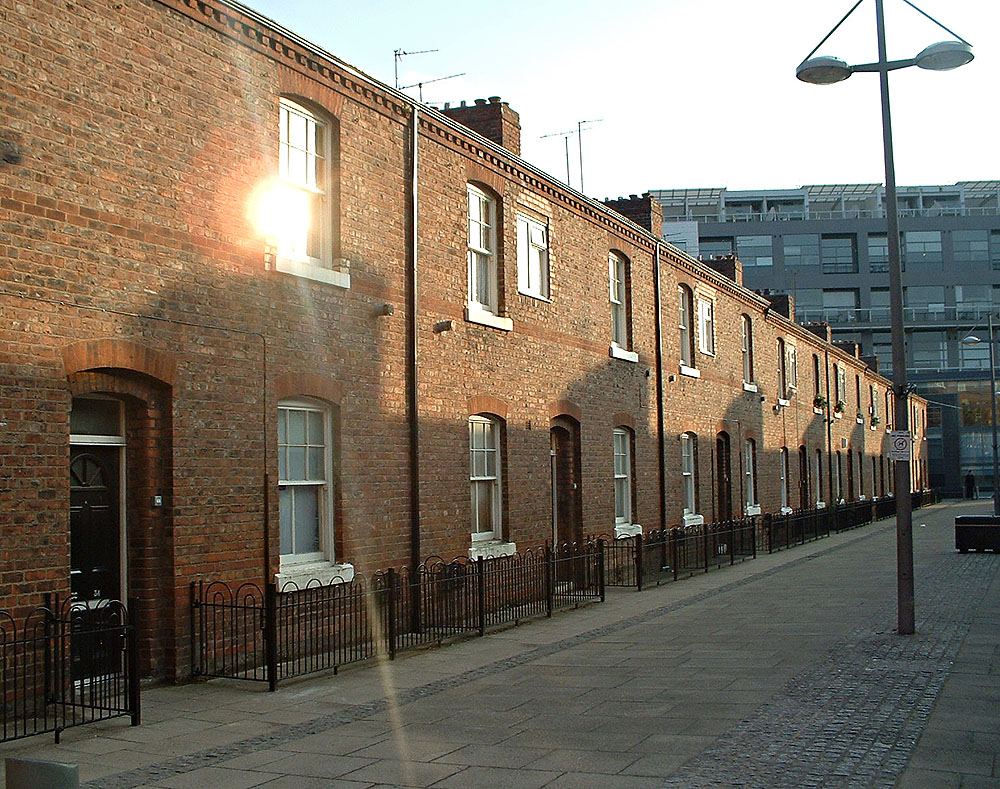
- Ancoats is a former industrial district being gentrified as a residential area.

- Location within Greater Manchester
- OS grid reference: SJ847985
- Metropolitan borough: City of Manchester
- Metropolitan county: Greater Manchester
- Region: North West
- Country: England
- Sovereign state: United Kingdom
- Post town: MANCHESTER
- Postcode district: M4
- Dialling code: 0161
- Police: Greater Manchester
- Fire: Greater Manchester
- Ambulance: North West
- UK Parliament: Manchester Central

Ancoats is an area of Manchester, England, immediately north-east of Manchester city centre and adjacent to the Northern Quarter.

Historically in Lancashire, Ancoats became a cradle of the Industrial Revolution and has been called "the world's first industrial suburb". For many years, from the late 18th century onwards, Ancoats was a thriving industrial district and known for its large Irish population. The area suffered accelerating economic decline from the 1930s and depopulation in the years after the Second World War, particularly during the slum clearances of the 1960s.

Since the 1990s, Ancoats' industrial heritage has been recognised and its proximity to the city centre has led to investment and substantial regeneration. The southern part of the area was branded New Islington by property developers Urban Splash, with redevelopment centred on the Daily Express Building.

In 2021, a plaque was put in place acknowledging Ancoats' status as a Little Italy.

For the purpose of local government elections, the area is part of the Ancoats and Beswick ward on Manchester City Council.

== History ==
=== Medieval ===
The name Ancoats is likely to have derived from the Old English ana cots, meaning "lonely cottages". The settlement is first recorded as Elnecot in 1212. In a survey of 1320, Ancoats was recorded as one of the eight hamlets within the township of Manchester in the ancient parish of Manchester within the hundred of Salford; the hamlet probably consisted of a few cottages and farmhouses centred on what is now Ancoats Lane, Butler Lane and Newton Lane. During the medieval period, Ancoats Hall was built. Land in Ancoats was bequeathed in the 14th century by Henry de Ancotes. The village covered the area of land that roughly lies between the River Medlock and the River Irk.

=== Industrial Revolution ===
==== Cotton ====
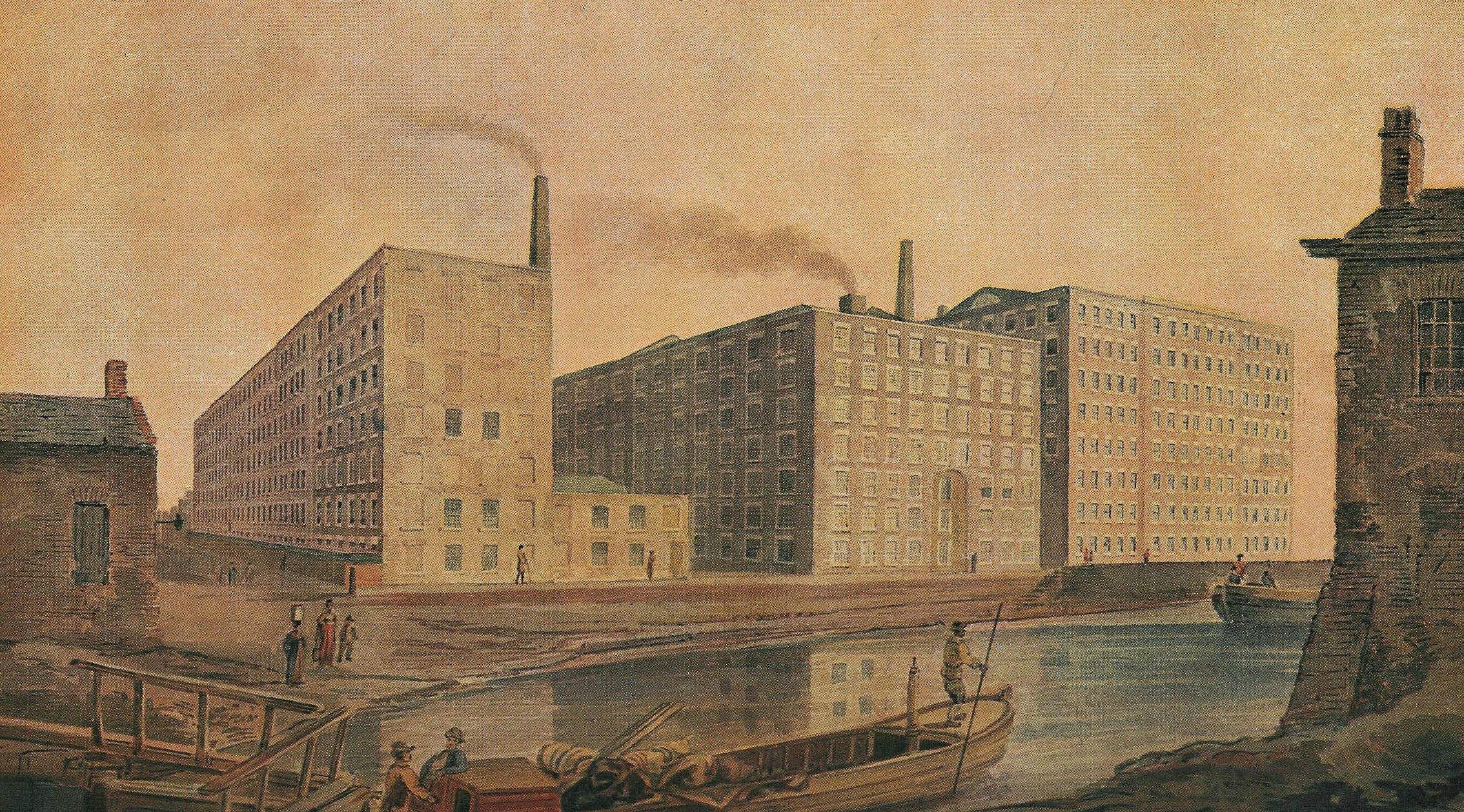
McConnel's Mills, 1820

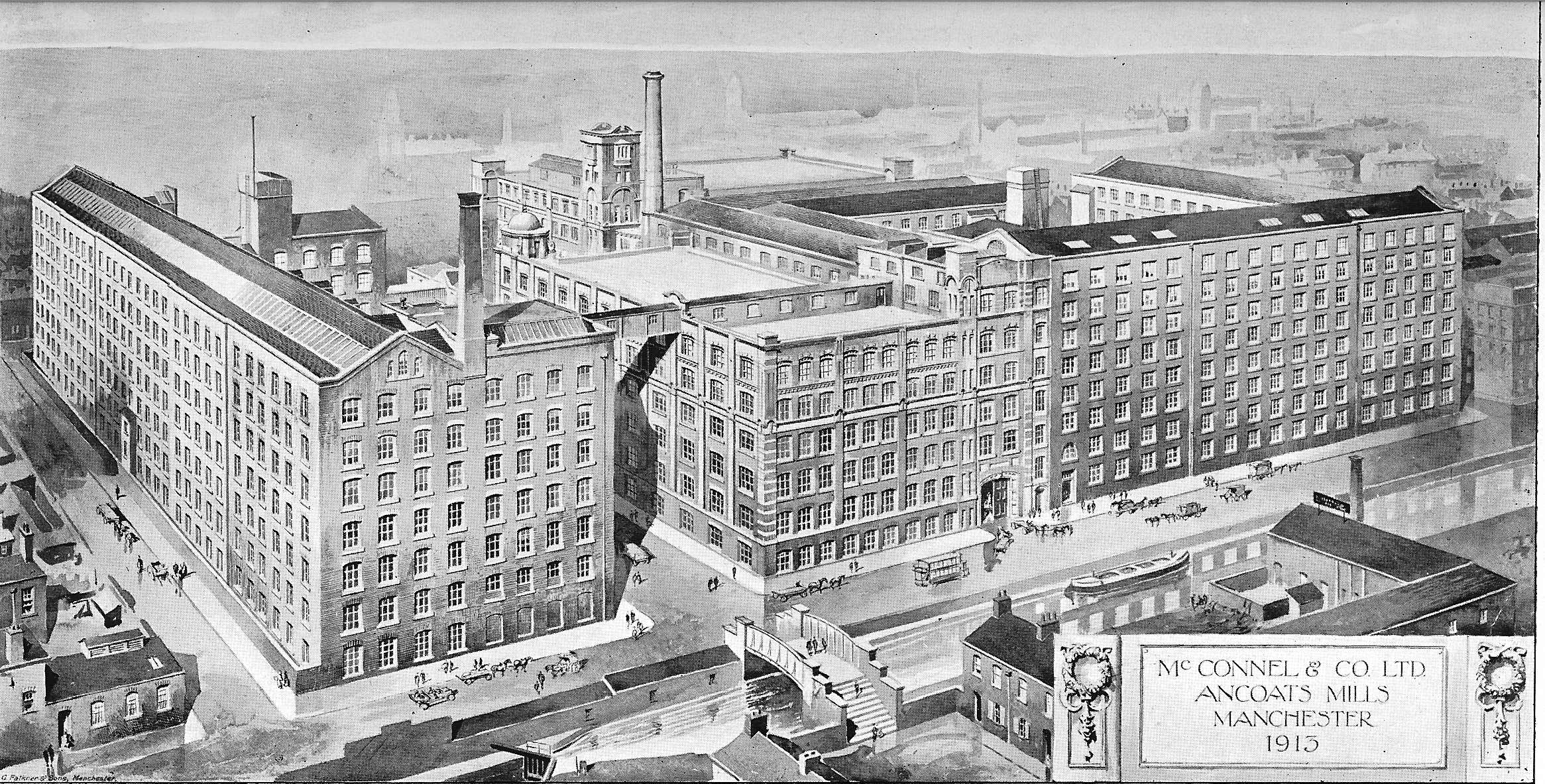
McConnel's Mills, 1913

Survey work for the Rochdale Canal was carried out by James Brindley in 1765. The knowledge that its construction would make the transport of raw materials and finished goods more convenient gave industrialists the confidence to build their cotton mills. The first mills were built in Ancoats as early as 1790. In 1792 commissioners were established for the improvement of the township of Manchester, which included Ancoats. Towards the end of the 18th century steam power was first used to power the cotton mills. Some of the earliest mills of this period were Murray's Mills, which were established next to the Rochdale Canal on Union Street (now Redhill Street) off Great Ancoats Street, by Adam and George Murray in 1798. Later, they became known as Ancoats Mills when they were operated by McConnel & Company Ltd. The streets of Ancoats were also laid out during the latter part of the 18th century, with little development taking place other than small houses and shops along Great Ancoats Street and Oldham Road (A62 road).

From the opening of the Rochdale Canal in 1804 the development of mills continued on a much larger scale. Mills in Ancoats included Victoria Mills, Wellington Mill, Brunswick Mill, India Mills, Dolton Mills, Lonsdale Mills, Phoenix Mill, Lloydsfield Mill, Sedgewick Mill, Decker Mill (owned by the Murray brothers), New Mill, Beehive Mill, Little Mill, Paragon Mill, Royal Mill and Pin Mill.

Ancoats grew rapidly to become an important industrial centre and as a result it also became a densely populated area. By 1815 Ancoats was the most populous district in Manchester. Streets of back-to-back houses and court dwellings were rapidly built. For the poorest members of the community, houses were split and cellars let separately. Public health was a concern; a survey motivated by the fear of a cholera outbreak showed that over half of homes in Ancoats had no private plumbing, and over half of streets were not cleaned.

By the middle of the 19th century, Ancoats was densely developed. In 1851 Ancoats' total population was 53,737, larger than towns such as Bury and Blackburn. However, despite this large population, Ancoats lacked public buildings and spaces. There were no parks and the only public buildings were a few churches and a dispensary. As late as 1821 there had been no churches.

==== Foundries ====
Cotton was not the only industry in the locality, as foundries and engineering factories were required to produce the machinery needed by the mills. The largest of these were those operated by the brothers John Muir Hetherington and Thomas Ridley Hetherington, which were established in 1830. Eventually the company became known as John Hetherington and Sons Ltd and the principal factory was at Vulcan Works on Pollard Street. The company was also the proprietor of Curtis, Sons & Company, which was established in 1804 at the Phoenix Works, which were on both sides of Chapel Street (now Chapeltown Street). On one side of the street there was a brass and iron works and on the other side there was a machinery factory. Hetherington's produced a huge range of machinery for the textile industry that included machinery for opening, preparing, spinning and doubling cotton, cotton waste, wool and worsted. Their speciality was a machine called a Combined Opener and Scutcher that was very effective in the cleaning of most types of cotton without damaging the staple or losing serviceable fibre.

==== Glass works ====
Possibly the least known, but vitally important, industry in Ancoats was the manufacture of flint glass. More than 25 glassworks have been identified in Manchester, all built during the 19th century, and many of these were in Ancoats. Thomas Percival and William Yates established one of these on Union Street (now Redhill Street) in 1844. The works was equipped with two furnaces (later three), an annealing house, workshops, a warehouse and offices. In 1852, Thomas Vickers joined the company and William Yates left in 1862. After this, the company became known as Percival Vickers British and Foreign Flint Glass Works. It made a large range of glassware that included tumblers, wine glasses, decanters, vases, celery vases, salts and cake stands. One of the buildings in Ancoats, the Flint Glass Works, still exists today and has been converted into serviced offices.

==== Other industries ====
At the top of Stony Brow (later Junction Street and now Jutland Street) there was the multi-storey drysalters factory of Thomas Hassall. It was said that this was the only drysalters in England and it supplied rock salt, moss litter and all kinds of other things. There were also chemical works (especially alum), floor-cloth works and finishing and calendering works that rolled cloth to smooth or glaze it.

=== Later Victorian period ===
==== Immigration ====
Ancoats became home to a large number of Irish immigrants from the mid-nineteenth century onwards. According to the 1851 census, nearly half of all men living in Ancoats had been born in Ireland, and Ancoats remained synonymous with the Manchester-Irish identity until the slum clearances of the 1960s. The Irish community was served by pubs such as the Shamrock, which opened in 1808 and only finally closed its doors in 2018. As late as 2025, the funeral cortege of Manchester-Irish gangster Jimmy the Weed Donnelly left Ancoats led by a horse-drawn carriage draped in an Irish tri-colour and accompanied by an Irish pipe band.

Ancoats also experienced substantial immigration from Italy, concentrated in the parish of St Michaels. Starting with around 180 Italian families in 1895, the population grew to about 3,000 in 1910 and for most of them, St Michael's was their Church. This enclave within Ancoats became known as Little Italy. Most of the Italians who arrived in Ancoats were from Liguria, in northwest Italy, and Frosinone and Gaeta, southeast of Rome.

==== Religion and poor relief ====
The Methodists were very active in Ancoats at the end of the 19th century – they ran both a men's workhouse and women's night shelter (with coffee tavern). There were dozens of pubs, however, of which only five buildings remain and only two of these are still open. The Salvation Army had a presence in Ancoats, with the Star Hall and Crossley Hospital in Pollard Street. Crossley Court, flats belonging to the Salvation Army Housing Association, now stands on the site. Ancoats Hospital was located on Old Mill Street, adjacent to the Ashton Canal. This has been closed to patients for some time, and is currently under residential development. Thomas Horsfall opened the Manchester Art Museum, a free art gallery, in Ancoats in 1886. His aim was to create a morally elevating alternative to pubs.

Given the historically high levels of Irish and Italian immigration, a large proportion of Ancoats' population has been Roman Catholic. Ancoats had a colony of Italians from 1835 and many of them became successful in business; e.g. the Ronchetti family were opticians, instrument makers and also waterproof manufacturers; J. L. Casartelli was an optician, instrument maker and manufacturing chemist.

During the late 19th century, Ancoats was home to various street-fighting gangs known as scuttlers, including the Bengal Tigers and the Prussia Street Lads.

=== Early 20th century ===
Aircraft were manufactured in Ancoats and this factory was at Brownsfield Mill, which was on the corner of Great Ancoats Street and Binns Place at the point where the Rochdale Canal passes below Great Ancoats Street. Here, Avro established a factory in 1910. Men from Ancoats serving in the Army in France during the First World War were aware that aeroplanes they saw in action above them had been made in Ancoats.

In 1939, the Daily Express newspaper company opened new premises, which were built in the "functional" style, using new curtain-wall technology identical to that on the company's Daily Express Building in Fleet Street, London and in Glasgow.

=== Post-war decline ===
The substantial economic activity generated by such a concentration of mills was halted by the slump in the cotton industry in the 1930s. Thereafter, the prosperity of the mills declined steadily, and the only new industry to establish itself in Ancoats was newspaper printing. Ancoats, like neighbouring Miles Platting and Collyhurst, became very run down and notorious for deprivation and crime. Cotton spinning ceased in Manchester and other textile-related uses were found for the mills: clothes manufacture, machinery repairs and warehouses for imported goods' rag trade.

The 1960s witnessed further decline as, during the mass clearance of the area's terraced homes, the population was re-housed in the north and east of the city. The mills, attracting decreasing rents, fell into disrepair.

Despite the clearance of Victorian terraces during the early 1960s and the relocation of most households to overspill estates like Hattersley and Gamesley, many new houses and flats were built in Ancoats by the local council. Inevitably, the local area's population was lower by 1970 than it had been a decade earlier, as the new housing developments were more spaced out, and some former residential areas had been redeveloped for commercial and industrial use.

Newspaper printing, one of Ancoats' 20th century industries, fell victim to changes in technology, with the Daily Express ceasing to be published from its famous black glass building in 1989. The closure of Express Printers was also the start of Ancoats' renewal, as the impact of low investment and increasing unemployment became recognised.

=== Regeneration ===
In June 1989, Manchester City Council designated land bounded by Great Ancoats Street, Oldham Road, Kemp Street, Wadeford Close, Jersey Street and the Rochdale Canal into a conservation area where a number of buildings were listed. While it protected a number of historically significant buildings, it made regeneration more difficult. In 1990, the Eastside Regeneration was formed, the first organisation created to regenerate the area. The Eastside Regeneration in turn spawned the formation of the Ancoats Build Preservation Trust in 1995 and the Ancoats Urban Village Company in 1996. Unfortunately, Manchester's bids for the 1996 and 2000 Olympics caused speculative buying of property in Ancoats in the early 1990s. When the bids failed the buildings were abandoned and decay accelerated. By 1998 it was estimated that 80% of business floor space in Ancoats was vacant.

In 2000, the government accepted the £250m New Islington Project to redevelop a 0.125-square-kilometre (31-acre) section of land between the Rochdale and Ashton Canals. To assist regeneration by preventing speculative purchase of land the North West Development Agency made a compulsory purchase order of land in the area. A target population of 15,000 by 2010 was set for the Ancoats area.

In the 2020s, parts of Ancoats and surrounding areas will be regenerated as part of the Victoria North development.

== Landmarks ==
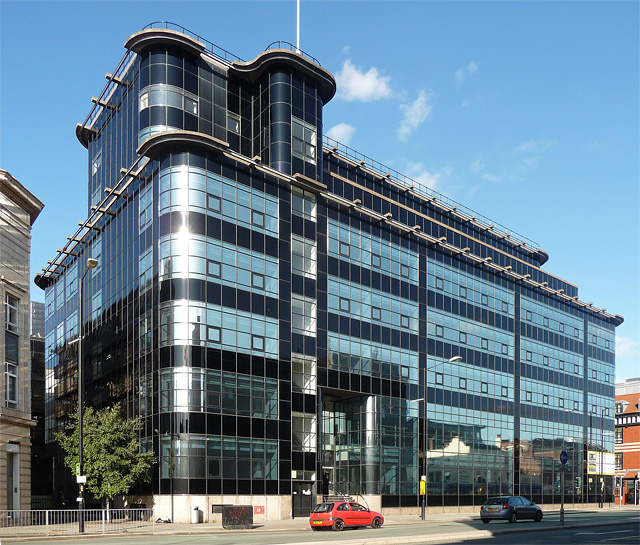
The Grade II*-listed former Daily Express Building on Great Ancoats Street

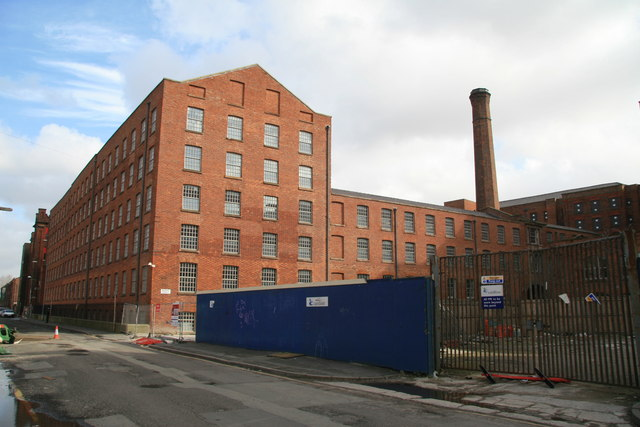
The Grade II* Murrays' Mills, one of the largest cotton-spinning buildings in the world

The following listed buildings are in the Ancoats conservation area:

- Beehive Mill, Jersey Street – built between 1820 and 1824; Grade II*
- Brownsfield Mill, Great Ancoats Street – built around 1825; Grade II*
- Crown and Kettle public house, Oldham Road – probably early 19th century; Grade II
- Daily Express Building, Great Ancoats Street – designed by Sir Owen Williams, 1939; Grade II*
- Doubling Mill and Fireproof Mill – early 19th century and 1842; Grade II*
- Former Church of St Peter, Blossom Street – designed by Isaac Holden & Son, 1859–60; Grade II
- Former warehouse and offices of Old Mill, Decker Mill, and New Mill, Murray Street – built around 1806; Grade II
- New Mill, Jersey Street – built in 1804; Grade II*
- Old Mill and Decker Mill, Redhill Street – built in 1798 and 1802; Grade II*
- Paragon Mill, Jersey Street – built around 1912; Grade II*
- Royal Mill, Henry Street – built around 1912; Grade II*
- Sedgwick Mill, Redhill Street – probably designed by Sir William Fairbairn, built 1818–1820; Grade II
- Sedgwick New Mill, Redhill Street – built in 1868; Grade II
- Victoria Square tenement block, Oldham Road – designed by Spalding & Cross, 1889; Grade II

== Culture ==
- Hallé St Peter's is a rehearsal and education venue for the Hallé Orchestra, based on the grade II listed former St Peter's Church, Blossom Street.
- Sankeys nightclub was in Beehive Mill on Radium Street. It closed officially in 2018.
- Hallé St Michael's, a community space for the Hallé's artistic and educational activities, is on George Leigh Street.

== Cultural references ==
The Thin Lizzy hits Johnny the Fox Meets Jimmy the Weed and The Boys are Back in Town were inspired by the Ancoats-based Quality Street Gang who were said to be responsible for much of the organised crime in Manchester in the 1960s and 1970s.

Ancoats has been the setting for several novels by Howard Spring, including Fame is the Spur. It was also the setting for Isabella Banks' novel The Manchester Man.

Ancoats was mentioned in the lyrics of Brian and Michael's 1978 UK number one hit, "Matchstalk Men and Matchstalk Cats and Dogs", a tribute to L. S. Lowry.

A fictional singer, Ann Coates, is credited with backing vocals on the 1986 single "Bigmouth Strikes Again" by the Smiths.

The British trip-hop band The Baby Namboos released a song and album titled Ancoats 2 Zambia in 1999. The single was remixed by drum and bass producer Dillinja.

The track "Ancodia" by 808 State was named after the area, where two of the band members lived at the time.

== Notable people ==
- Hugh Oldham (1452–1519), Bishop of Exeter from 1505 to his death in 1519. He was born to a family of minor gentry who lived in Ancoats. Bishop Oldham was a patron of education who founded Manchester Grammar School and was a major benefactor of Corpus Christi College, Oxford.
- Richard Buxton (1786–1865), an impoverished shoemaker from Ancoats. He published a botanical guide to the plants to be found around Manchester in 1849.
- William Hepworth Dixon (1821–1879), the historian and travel writer, born in Great Ancoats
- John Sibbit (1895–1950), British track cyclist who won a silver medal at the 1928 Summer Olympics
- Bernard Manning (1930–2007), stand-up comedian
- Foo Foo Lammar (1937–2003), drag queen. She was born in Ancoats and later lived in the area's Piccadilly Village apartments.
- John Henshaw (born 1951), actor. Notable for playing Ken, the pub landlord in the TV series Early Doors.
- Lesley Ann Downey, the fourth of the five known Moors murders victims, was from Ancoats. The fourth of the five Moors Murders victims, she lived in a then-new council maisonette in Charnley Close (demolished around 40 years later) with her mother, step-father and three brothers. She was lured from a fairground in Ancoats on Boxing Day 1964 by Ian Brady and Myra Hindley before being abused and murdered at their house in Hattersley. Her body was then buried on Saddleworth Moor, where it was discovered almost a year later.

== See also ==
- Listed buildings in Manchester-M4
- New Islington
