= The City, Manchester =

Listed pub in England

The City
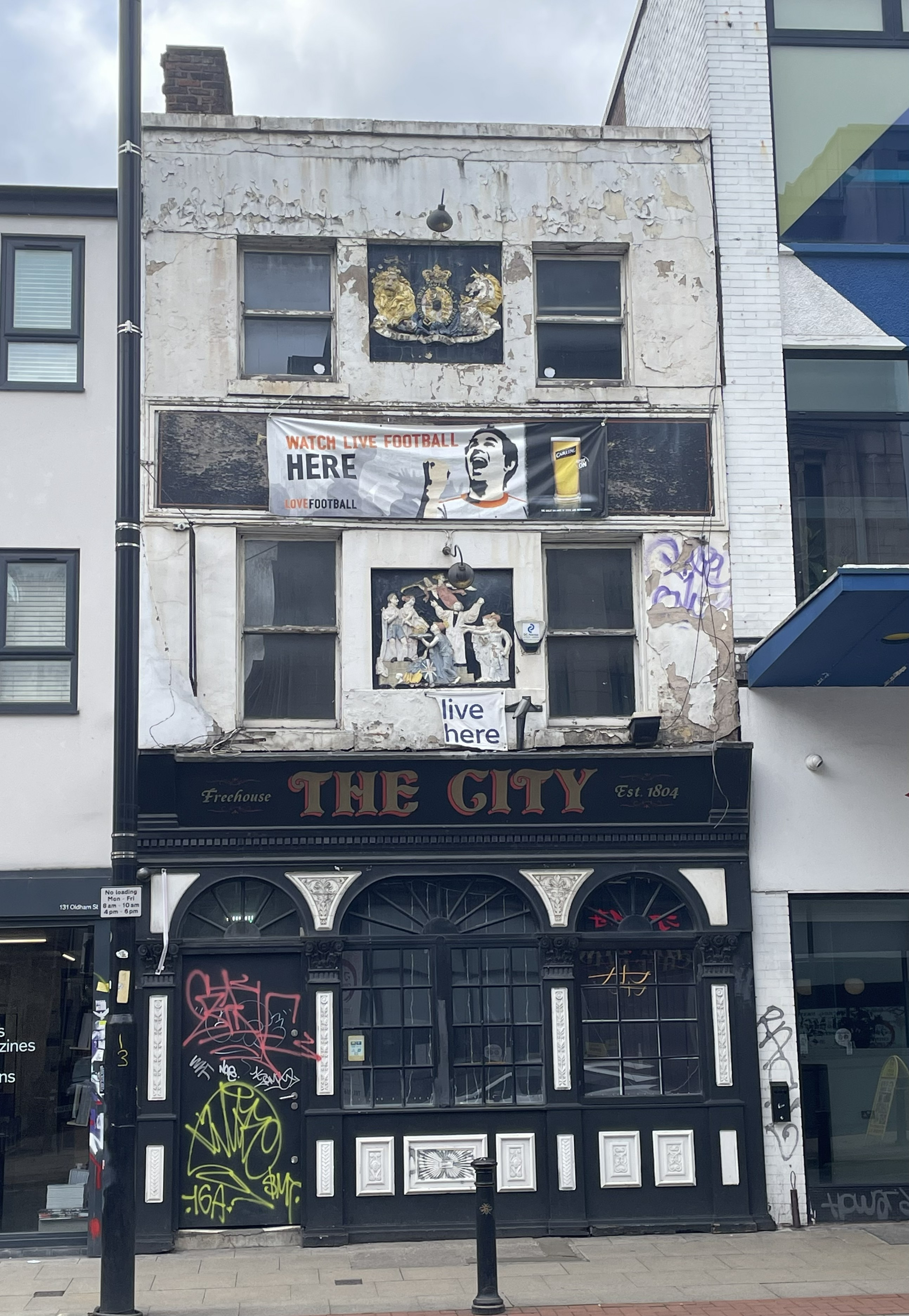
- The pub in 2026
- Former names: Prince of Orange, King's Arms

General information
- Type: Public house
- Location: 133 Oldham Street, Northern Quarter, Manchester, England
- Coordinates: 53.4844°N 2.2334°W
- Year built: Late 18th century (probable)
- Renovated: c. 1870 (altered)

Design and construction
- Designations

Listed Building – Grade II
- Official name: The City public house
- Designated: 3 October 1974
- Reference no.: 1271456

The City is a Grade II listed public house on Oldham Street in the Northern Quarter area of Manchester, England. The building originated as two dwellings constructed before 1782 and was combined into a pub by 1800, first known as the Prince of Orange and later as the King's Arms in the mid‑19th century. It acquired its current name at a later date. The pub closed in 2022 but is recorded by the Campaign for Real Ale (CAMRA) as trading again as of October 2026.

== History ==
According to Manchester City Council, the premises originated as two private dwellings built before 1782 and combined by 1800 to form a public house known as the Prince of Orange. (Note: The building's official listing states that it was probably constructed in the late 18th century.) Early Ordnance Survey mapping of central Manchester in 1849 and Slater's trade directories indicate that by the mid‑19th century the establishment was operating under a different name, appearing as the King's Arms and remaining so into the 1890s. Alterations to the pub took place around 1870.

The date at which the pub adopted the name The City is not documented in published sources. Nevertheless, when the building was designated a Grade II listed structure on 3 October 1974, the official listing recorded it under that name.

The City closed in September 2022, and although the Campaign for Real Ale (CAMRA) recorded it as "closed long term" in June 2024, CAMRA now lists the pub as trading again as of October 2026.

== Architecture ==
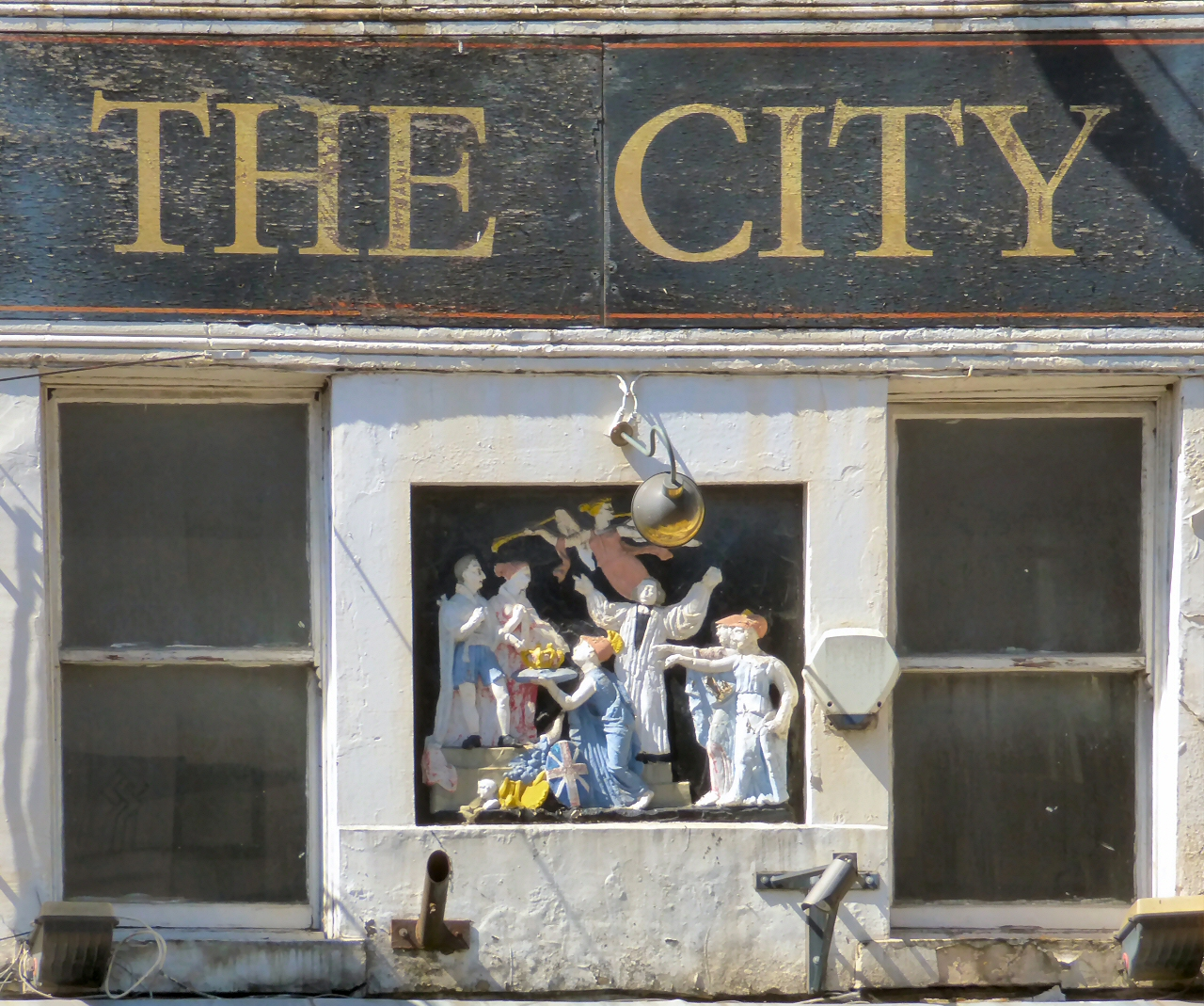
Relief panel depicting the arrival of William and Mary

The building is constructed in brick with a covering of stucco. It has three storeys and its roofline is concealed behind a parapet. The ground floor has an emphasised entrance and window openings framed by decorative detailing. The upper storeys each feature a central relief panel flanked by plain sash windows: the first‑floor panel shows a scene associated with the arrival of William and Mary, featuring allegorical and religious figures including Britannia, two helmeted women, a clergyman, and an angel; and the upper one showing a heraldic design. A large name panel spans the middle of the façade.

== See also ==
- Castle Hotel, another Grade II-listed pub on Oldham Street
- Listed buildings in Manchester-M4
- Listed pubs in Manchester
