= Night and Day Café =

Café bar and music venue in Manchester, England

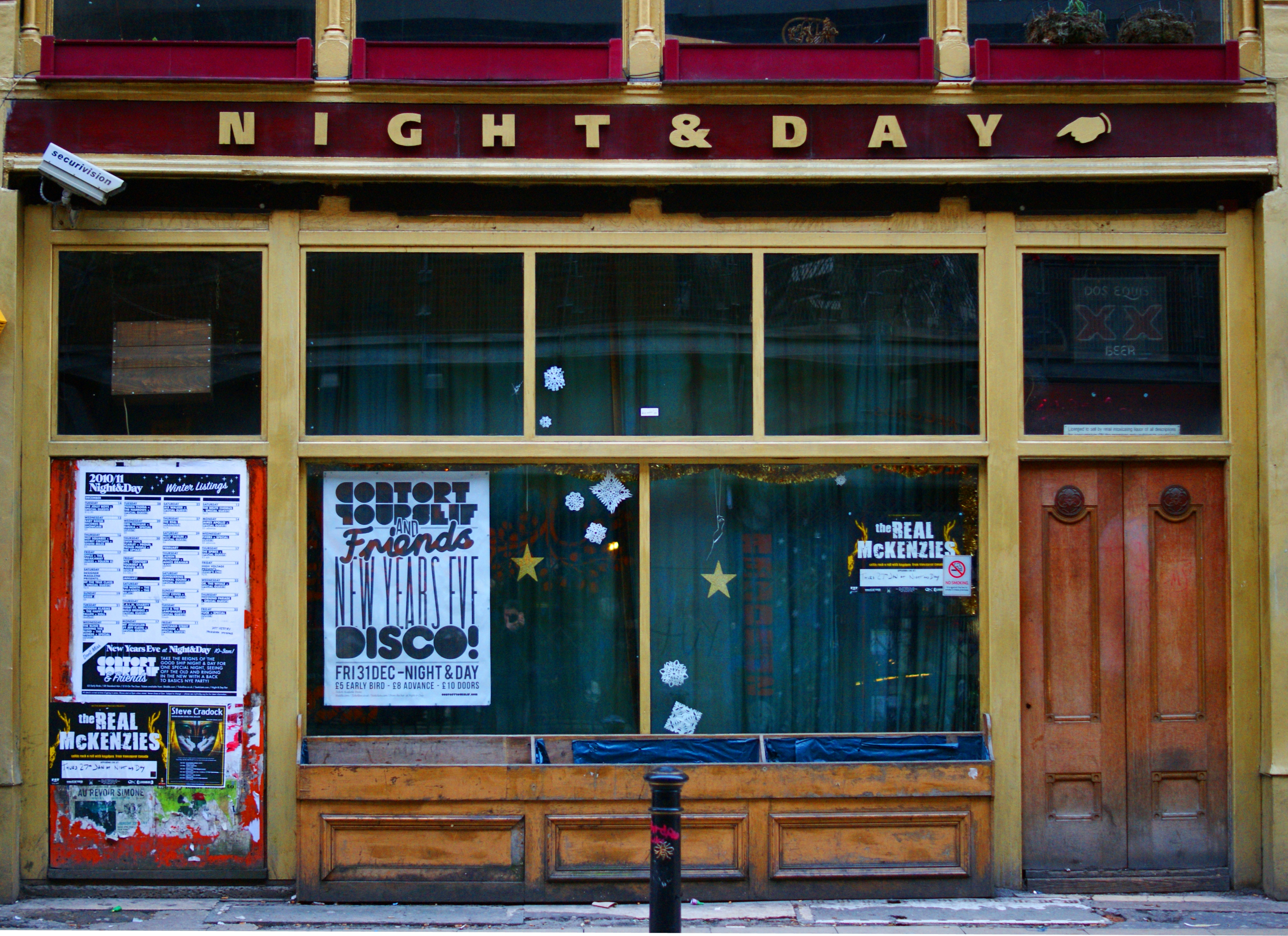
- Night and Day Café in 2011

- Location within Greater Manchester
- Location: Oldham Street, Northern Quarter, Manchester, England
- Coordinates: 53°28′57″N 2°14′7″W
- Type: Café bar and live music venue

Construction
- Opened: 1991

Website
- nightnday.org

The Night and Day Café is a café bar and live music venue on Oldham Street in the Northern Quarter area of Manchester city centre, England. Opened in 1991 in a former chip shop, it became known for supporting emerging bands and has hosted early performances by several artists who later achieved national and international success. The venue has faced periodic threats of closure due to noise complaints, most recently culminating in a 2024 court ruling that upheld but amended a noise abatement notice to allow it to continue operating under new conditions.

== Location ==
It is located in the city's Northern Quarter on Oldham Street, opposite Piccadilly Records. It is near the Afflecks Palace shopping arcade and a few minutes' walk from the Market Street/Arndale Centre shopping areas.

== History ==
The Night and Day opened in 1991 in a former chip shop in what was then a run-down part of the city centre. First owned by Jan Oldenburg, it developed into a music venue and became known for supporting alternative and emerging bands. When the venue faced the threat of closure, Elbow's Guy Garvey told radio station XFM that it had been important to his band's early career and that it deserved protected status and a blue plaque.

As of 2018, the venue is managed by Oldenburg's daughter and her husband.

== Live music ==
The café has been noted for its role in Manchester's music scene, with a number of artists playing early gigs there. Elbow performed at the venue before it had a permanent stage, and lead singer Garvey claims has said he used to give out Night and Day's phone number as a contact number because members of the band spent so much time there.

Other artists who have appeared at the venue include Lizzo, Kasabian, Jessie J, Paulo Nutini, the Arctic Monkeys and the Manic Street Preachers. The venue was also used as the filming location for the music video for Johnny Marr's single "Dynamo".

== Threats of closure ==
In January 2014, the Night and Day was at risk of permanent closure after a resident in the neighbouring flats complained about noise and Manchester City Council issued a nuisance notice. The venue's promoter and booker told the Manchester Evening News that reducing noise levels would discourage bands from playing and that a fine would jeopardise the venue. Musicians including Johnny Marr, Frank Turner and Tim Burgess expressed support for the venue, and a petition gained thousands of signatures. The dispute escalated when the then owner, Jan Oldenburg, said he felt he was being portrayed as uncooperative, and the complainant reported receiving death threats.

In May 2014, it was reported that the Music Venue Trust had expressed support for Night and Day's campaign, including a national petition calling for a review of noise abatement legislation for bars and venues in the UK. In September that year, it was reported that the venue would be able to keep its licence if staff agreed to meet regularly with residents to discuss any issues.

In November 2021, the venue was served with a noise abatement notice following ongoing complaints from a local resident who had moved into the area during the COVID-19 pandemic, when the venue was not open as usual. The owners said the notice placed the venue at risk of closure.

A petition calling for the notice to be withdrawn gained more than 94,000 signatures. Local businesses, residents, and bands, along with several high-profile musicians including Elbow, The Charlatans and Johnny Marr, expressed support for the venue on social media.

In March 2024, a district judge upheld the noise abatement notice but amended it to allow the venue to continue operating, provided that weekend club nights comply with new noise‑limiting conditions.

== In popular culture ==
The venue is referenced in the American TV drama Lost, in the season three episode "Greatest Hits", as the place where the Mancunian character Charlie's band, DriveShaft, played its first gig.

In 2018, the venue appeared as the bar "Heaven" in the Michael C. Hall Netflix drama Safe.
