= Castle Hotel, Manchester =

Listed pub in England

Castle Hotel
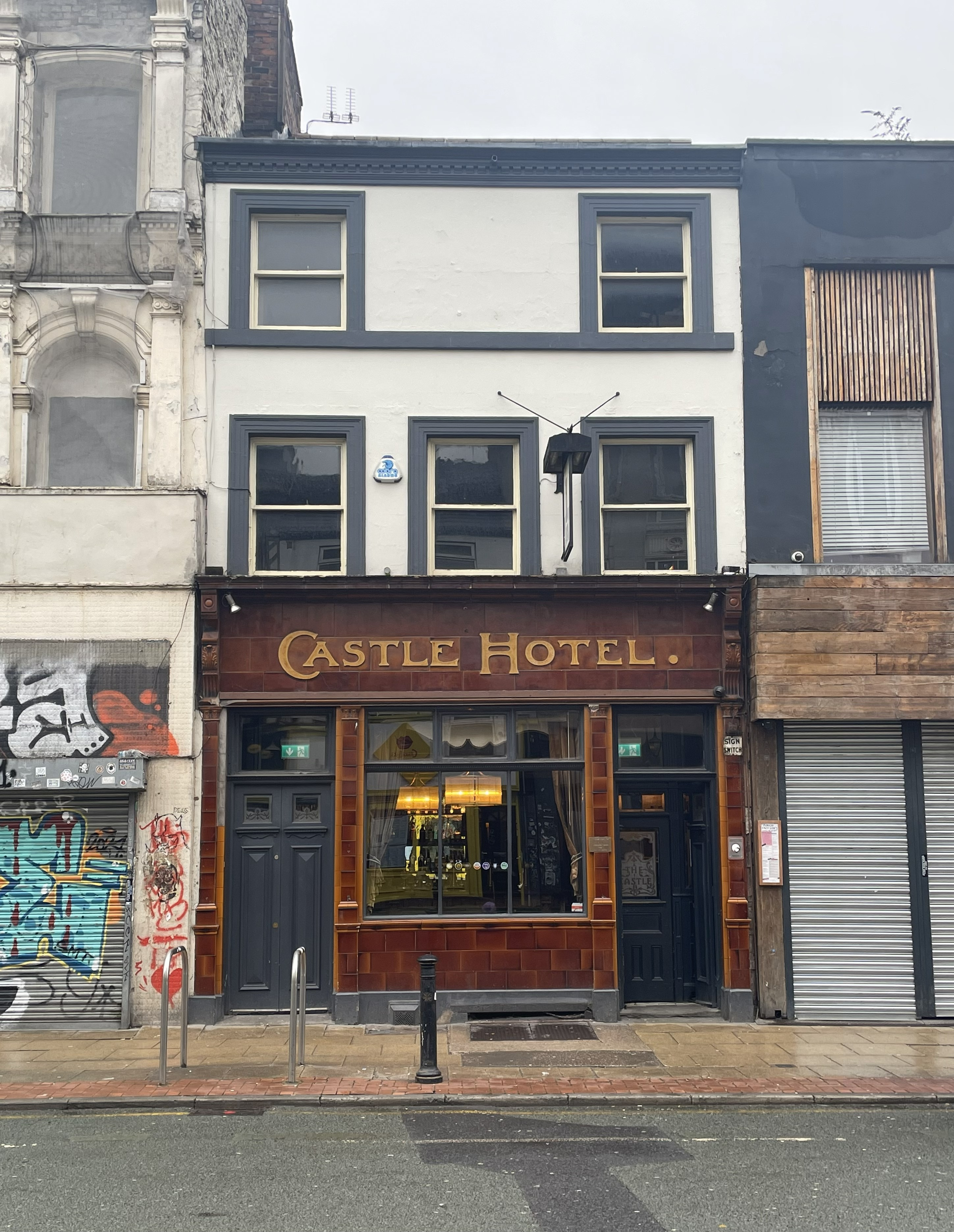
- The pub in 2026

General information
- Type: Public house
- Location: 66 Oldham Street, Northern Quarter, Manchester, England
- Coordinates: 53.4841°N 2.2323°W
- Year built: Early to mid-19th century
- Renovated: c. 1900 (altered); 2009 (renovated)

Technical details
- Floor count: 3

Design and construction
- Designations

Listed Building – Grade II
- Official name: Castle Hotel
- Designated: 19 June 1988
- Reference no.: 1246280

Other information
- Public transit: Manchester Victoria

Website
- thecastlehotel.info

The Castle Hotel is a Grade II listed public house and live music venue on Oldham Street in the Northern Quarter area of Manchester, England. Built in the early to mid-19th century, its interior, which includes a curved bar front finished in multicoloured glazed faience, is regarded by the Campaign for Real Ale (CAMRA) as being of "outstanding national historic importance".

== History ==
A public house known as the Crown and Sceptre was established on the site in 1776, although the present building is thought to date from the early to mid-19th century. It became known as the Castle Hotel in the late 19th century. Around 1904 the pub was remodelled by Kay's Atlas Brewery, who added glazed tiles to the exterior frontage of the ground floor.

On 19 June 1988, the Castle Hotel was designated a Grade II listed building. A live music venue since the early 1990s, the building fell into disrepair by the 2000s and closed in 2008.

The Castle Hotel is regarded by the Campaign for Real Ale (CAMRA) as having an interior of "outstanding national historic importance" and is rated three stars on its National Inventory of Historic Pub Interiors.

In 2009 the pub was acquired and renovated by former Coronation Street actor Rupert Hill and business partner Jonny Booth, and it continues to be a live music venue.

== Architecture ==
The building has a smooth rendered finish with sections of coloured ceramic work; the roof cannot be seen from the street. It is a slim, rectangular structure set perpendicular to the road. There are three short storeys arranged symmetrically. The ground floor is faced in dark, glazed ceramic tiles and includes a large central window framed by vertical features, with doorways on either side. A wide band above this carries raised lettering reading "CASTLE HOTEL," and is topped with decorative supports beneath a shaped ledge.

The first floor has three sash windows without dividing bars, each set within a shaped surround. The top floor has two similar windows, linked visually by a shared sill. A detailed cornice runs along the roofline.

Inside, the building still contains an unusual bar front made of brightly coloured, curved ceramic tiles.

== See also ==
- The City, another Grade II-listed pub on Oldham Street
- Listed buildings in Manchester-M4
- Listed pubs in Greater Manchester
