= Manchester Roadhouse =

Former music club in Manchester, England

Coordinates: 53.48103°N 2.23374°W

The Manchester Roadhouse was a basement music club based at number 8 Newton Street in the Northern Quarter of Manchester, England. In March 2015, it was announced that it was to close for business later that year.

== History ==
The Roadhouse was founded on the site of a former Victorian mill in a building which was formerly home to photo printing equipment company E.N. Mason and Sons during the late 1950s. In the 1970s, it was known as Papa's Club; a snack bar and nightclub split into two rooms and owned by Thomas Papathomas. The club was later owned by John McBeath who launched it as a blues venue but in 1999 it was purchased by Kate Mountain who ran the club until its closure in 2015.

Mountain began her career at the Roadhouse in 1994 by working behind the bar and later managing the venue. She remained at the Roadhouse after graduating but when the owners went bankrupt she decided at the age of 25 to buy the venue and did so along with the venue's technical manager Steve Lloyd, who had previous experience of running a business.

The 200-capacity venue became a central part of the Manchester music scene, supporting local artists as well as being an essential stop off for touring bands. Internationally famous bands who have graced the stage during the early part of their careers include Coldplay, Muse and the White Stripes.

Four members of the band Elbow worked at the Roadhouse before they were signed and the band also played regular gigs there. Mountain has said that when they were playing at the venue it produced logistical challenges because it meant she had no staff. The band have always had a close relationship with the Roadhouse and returned to the venue in February 2015 to play a gig there in aid of the War Child charity. When Mountain announced the following month that the venue was to close, Elbow's lead singer Guy Garvey told the Manchester Evening News that his former boss should be immortalised with a bronze statue in Manchester.

On 29 March 2014, Roadhouse co-owner and sound engineer Lloyd died at the Christie Hospital, Manchester, after being diagnosed with cancer. Musicians from across Manchester paid tribute to Lloyd who had worked with bands across the city including Elbow and Doves. In July of the same year, a gig headlined by Badly Drawn Boy was held at the Roadhouse in Lloyd's memory, which raised money for the Christie Hospital.

== Club nights ==
The Roadhouse hosted regular club and gig nights including the Electric Chair, Long Live Rock and Roll, Underachievers Please Try Harder, Get a Grip, and ChairsMissing.

== Closure announcement ==
On 19 March 2015, it was announced that the Manchester Roadhouse was to permanently close at the end of May. The news was met with sadness in the city, with fans sharing their memories of the Roadhouse in the Manchester Evening News. Just days later, a further announcement revealed that Mountain would be turning the venue into a new city centre restaurant with her business partner the chef Mary-Ellen McTague, with whom Mountain had previously owned Prestwich-based restaurant Aumbry.

McTague had her first job preparing food at the Roadhouse whilst she was a student and admitted to having mixed feelings about the venue's closure but also explained that due to the larger space offered by the Roadhouse they would have more freedom than they had running Aumbry. Speaking about the decision to turn the Roadhouse into a restaurant, Mountain also added that she did not feel as in touch with the music scene as she used to and wanted to pursue new ventures.

The closure of the Roadhouse was covered on local news programme Granada Reports on 10 June 2015, which saw the band Elbow return to the venue to be interviewed alongside their former boss Mountain.
