= Popular music of Manchester =

Music in the UK city

Manchester's music scene produced successful bands in the 1960s including the Hollies, the Bee Gees and Herman's Hermits. After the punk rock era, Manchester produced popular bands including Joy Division, New Order, the Smiths, Simply Red and the Fall. In the late 1980s, the ecstasy-fuelled dance club scene played a part in the rise of Madchester with bands like the Stone Roses, Inspiral Carpets and Happy Mondays. In the 1990s, Manchester saw the rise of Britpop bands, notably Oasis.

== History ==
=== Pop groups of the 1960s and early 1970s ===
Manchester and its surrounding area had an impressive music scene before 1976, with groups in the 1960s including the Hollies, the Bee Gees, Herman's Hermits, Wayne Fontana and the Mindbenders, and Freddie and the Dreamers. Barclay James Harvest formed in nearby Oldham in 1966 and 10cc in Stockport in the early 1970s. Top of the Pops was also recorded by the BBC at this time in the city.

Manchester bands Freddie and the Dreamers, Wayne Fontana and the Mindbenders and Herman's Hermits topped the American Billboard charts consecutively during mid-April – May 1965. In 1965, all three bands were numbers 1, 2 and 3 on the US Billboard top 100 for one week. Graham Nash of the Hollies moved to California to become part of the rapidly expanding music scene there. With the exception of Graham Gouldman of 10cc and Eric Stewart of the Mindbenders (who built Strawberry Studios in Stockport, the UK's first world class recording studio outside London), and Keith Hopwood of Herman's Hermits (whose Pluto Studios started in the same building as Strawberry, then spent 1977–1987 in the centre of Manchester), there was little reinvestment in Manchester from its local musicians who had been successful.

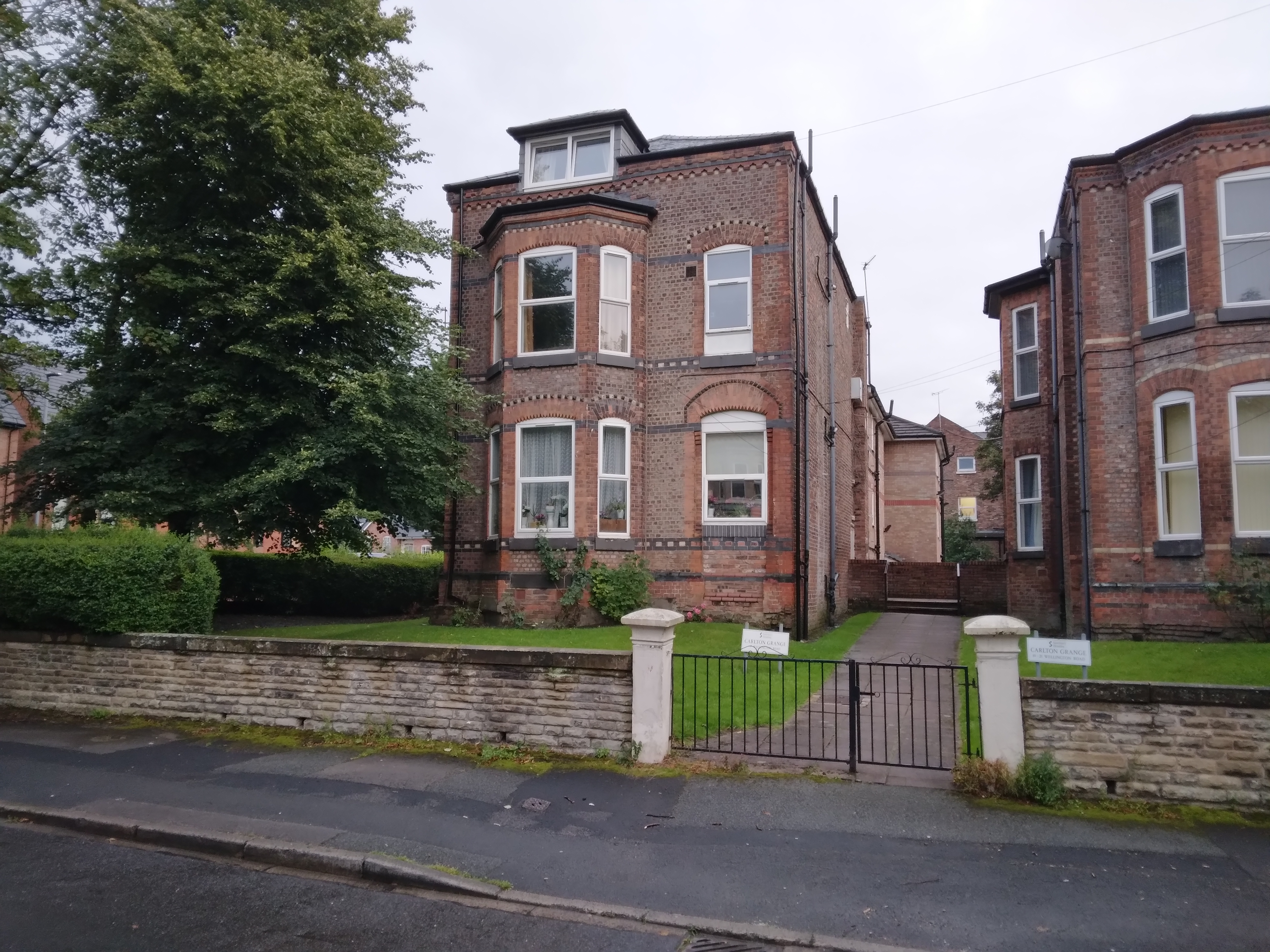
The former Clifton Grange Hotel, Whalley Range, Manchester, pictured in 2023

Philomena Lynott (1930-2019), the Irish mother of Thin Lizzy frontman Phil Lynott, ran the Clifton Grange Hotel (on the corner of Wellington Road and Alness Road) in Whalley Range from 1966 to 1980. On visits to Manchester, Phil Lynott would stay with her there, and took inspiration from the colourful 'showbiz' clientele he met who frequented the hotel. The Thin Lizzy songs "Clifton Grange Hotel", "Johnny The Fox Meets Jimmy The Weed" and "The Boys Are Back in Town" were inspired by characters and events in the hotel during the period.

=== Punk rock and Sex Pistols at the Lesser Free Trade Hall ===
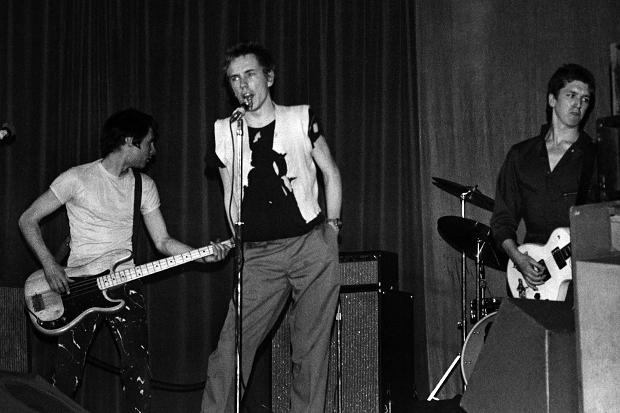
Sex Pistols at Manchester's Lesser Free Trade Hall on 4 June 1976, inspired the formation of Joy Division, the Smiths, Factory and Creation Records. While the 20 July show inspired the Fall and Ian Curtis

On 4 June and 20 July 1976, at the invitation of Howard Devoto and Pete Shelley of the Buzzcocks, the Sex Pistols performed two shows at the Lesser Free Trade Hall. The Buzzcocks had formed after seeing the band live in London in February 1976. The crowd for the June and July Manchester shows consisted of around 30 to 40 people, several key members of Manchester's future alternative music scene were present: Tony Wilson (Granada Television presenter and creator of Factory Records), Peter Hook and Bernard Sumner (Joy Division and New Order), Morrissey (later to form the Smiths with Johnny Marr), producer Martin Hannett, Mark E Smith of the Fall, Paul Morley (later to write for the NME and become an influential music journalist), Jonh Ingham of Sounds and Mick Hucknall of Simply Red.

Another influential event was the release of Buzzcocks' Spiral Scratch EP in early 1977 – the first punk release to be financed, produced and recorded purely independently by a band. In the wake of the release, the old movers and shakers from the Manchester music collective Music Force, who included producer Martin Hannett, Tosh Ryan and Lawrence Beadle, formed a local label called Rabid Records and started putting out singles by local acts like Slaughter & the Dogs (Rob Gretton later to manage Joy Division and New Order was their roadie/tour manager – all Wythenshawe lads), John Cooper Clarke and Ed Banger and the Nosebleeds (whose lineup included Vini Reilly) and they licensed "Jilted John" by Jilted John to EMI Records.

The timing of this record company coincided with Tony Wilson bringing American and British punk and New Wave bands to the public on his late night Granada Television show So It Goes. Manchester televised the Sex Pistols before they appeared on Thames Television with Bill Grundy. Manchester hosted The Sex Pistols Anarchy Tour twice at The Electric Circus, and these gigs influenced local musicians toward a do-it-yourself philosophy.

When So It Goes concluded on Granada TV, Tony Wilson wanted to remain involved in the local music scene, so he started an event night at the old Russell Club in Hulme called The Factory along with his friends (soon to be business partners) Alan Erasmus and Alan Wise. Deeply Vale Festivals (1976–1979), just north of Manchester between Rochdale and Bury, was the first free festival in the country to introduce punk bands such as Durutti Column, Fast Cars, the Fall and the Drones. The festival was compered by Tony Wilson as a favour to friend and organiser Chris Hewitt. Wilson had been taking a great interest in Rabid Records and its setup.

After working on the research for a Granada TV feature about Rabid, he along with Alan Erasmus and Joy Division manager Rob Gretton (the Ideal for Living EP had been distributed by Rabid) decided they would do their own version of Rabid Records, but instead of churning out singles and then licensing the album deals to major labels (Slaughter & the Dogs' debut appeared on Decca, John Cooper Clarke was licensed to CBS, and Jilted John to EMI), they would concentrate on albums.

=== Post-punk and Factory Records ===
Taking the Industrial Revolution as its model, Factory Records played upon Manchester's traditions, invoking at once apparently incongruous images of the industrial north and the glamorous pop art world of Andy Warhol. While label mates A Certain Ratio and the Durutti Column each forged their own sound, it was Factory's Joy Division who were the most prominent. Other bands that walked through the door opened by punk included the Salford Jets, fronted by Mike Sweeney, and the Freshies, led by Chris Sievey (Frank Sidebottom). There was also the idiosyncratic post-punk of the Membranes. The first Factory Records release following the A Factory Sample EP (which included Joy Division, the Durutti Column, Cabaret Voltaire, and John Dowie) was Unknown Pleasures by Joy Division, recorded at Strawberry Studios in Stockport.

At the same time, and out of the same post-punk of Joy Division combining rock, pop, and dance music to acclaim while selling millions of records. The group that would ultimately become the definitive Manchester group of the 1980s was the Smiths, led by Morrissey and Marr. With songs like "Rusholme Ruffians" and "Suffer Little Children", Morrissey sang explicitly about Manchester.

Other bands that have emerged from the Manchester music scene include Van der Graaf Generator, Oasis, the Smiths, Joy Division and its successor group New Order, Buzzcocks, the Stone Roses, the Fall, 10cc, Godley & Creme, the Verve, Elbow, Doves, the Charlatans, M People, the 1975, Simply Red, Blossoms, Take That, Dutch Uncles, Everything Everything, the Courteeners, Pale Waves, and the Outfield. Although from southern England, the Chemical Brothers subsequently formed in Manchester.

=== Madchester ===
As the 1980s drew to a close, a new energy arrived in Manchester fueled by the drug ecstasy. A new scene developed around The Haçienda night club (part of the Factory Records empire), creating what would become known as the Madchester scene, the main proponents being Happy Mondays, Inspiral Carpets, Northside, and the Stone Roses alongside the already legendary Hacienda co-owners New Order and Cheshire band the Charlatans. The history of the Manchester music scene over this period was dramatised in Michael Winterbottom's 2002 film 24 Hour Party People and the life of Joy Division's Ian Curtis was also dramatised in the 2007 film Control.

=== 1990s and after ===
Following the Madchester period, Manchester music lost much of its provincial energy, though many successful and interesting acts were still to emerge.

Morrissey, New Order, the Fall, James, and the Verve still continue to garner critical acclaim while Oasis remains the most popular, having played to more than 1.7 million people worldwide during their Don't Believe the Truth tour of 2005 and early 2006. In 2010, Manchester was named the UK's seventh "most musical" city by PRS for Music per head to some bemusement.

== Venues of the early 21st century ==
Manchester's biggest popular music venue is the Manchester Arena, which seats over twenty thousand one of the largest arena of its type in Europe (largest being Paris La Défense Arena with forty thousand seats), with the Etihad Stadium and Old Trafford's cricket grounds also providing large ad hoc open air venues outside of the sporting season. Other major venues include the Manchester Apollo, Manchester Central (formerly, and informally, known as the GMEX) and the Manchester Academy. There are over 30 smaller venues for signed and unsigned artists of all genres to perform in, ensuring that the music scene in Manchester constantly remains vibrant and interesting. Manchester is also home to Victoria Warehouse, one of the biggest electronic music venues in the country. Victoria Warehouse has been the stage to artists like Hardwell and Steve Aoki, as well as holding the BBC 6 Music Festival in 2014 and Warehouse Project in 2013.

An area known as the Northern Quarter, considered the cultural and musical heart of the city, houses some of the best known of these venues such as Band on the Wall, the Roadhouse and the Night and Day Café. Various other venues exist in pubs and clubs throughout the city.

In 2018, Manchester was named the UK's rock and indie capital, largely due to the high number of gigs hosted by the city's small and medium-sized venues. Research found that Manchester Academy had hosted the most rock and indie events in Manchester since its records began in 2015 – and the 5th most in the UK.

== Broadcast media ==
Granada TV, the BBC on Oxford Road and Key 103 have all played prominent roles in supporting and expanding various parts of the music scene in Manchester. Terry Christian on Key 103 weekday evenings throughout 1988/89 championed the Stone Roses, Happy Mondays, James, Inspiral Carpets, Yargo, and many others, pushing the local Manchester scene into the mainstream in Greater Manchester. The region is now served well by its own local radio shows, most notably via some regular weekly slots on BBC Radio GMR. London based commercial station Xfm Manchester in Manchester has also established itself, delivering a strictly indie diet to the populace and offering regular and effective exposure to local unsigned acts.

== See also ==
- List of songs about Manchester
