= Grand Central Hall =

Building in Liverpool, England

Coordinates: 53.4040°N 2.9767°W

Grand Central Hall, Liverpool
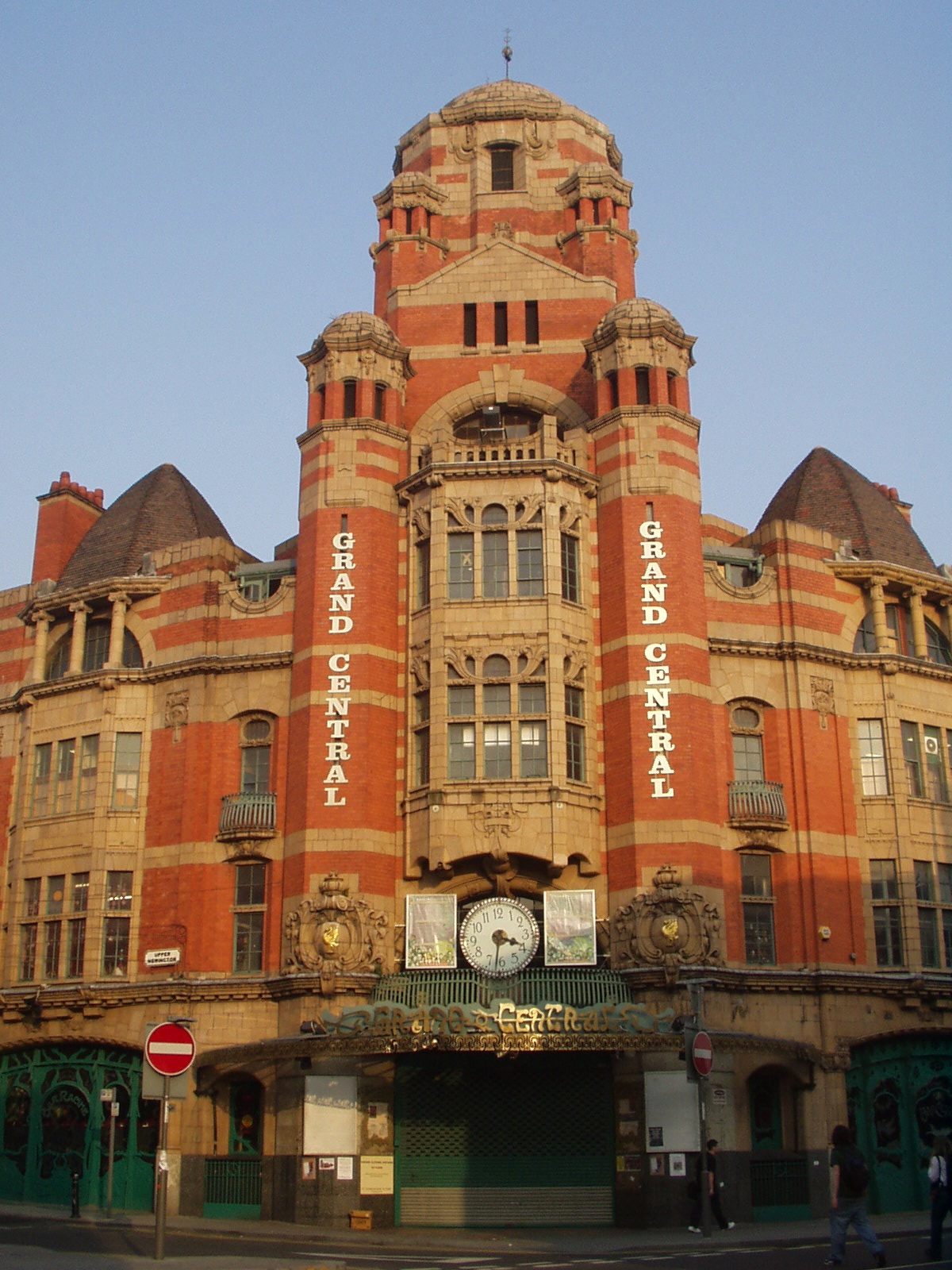
- The Grand Central Hall, Liverpool, viewed from Renshaw Street
- Interactive map of the Grand Central Hall, Liverpool area

General information
- Location: Liverpool, England, 35 Renshaw Street, Liverpool L1 2SF
- Completed: 1905

Design and construction
- Architect: Bradshaw & Gass

Other information
- Seating capacity: 1300

Website
- https://thedomeliverpool.com

Grand Central Hall is on 35 Renshaw Street, Liverpool, England. It is now the site of the Liverpool Grand Central Hotel, Hall and Grand Bazaar Food Hall. The building is recorded in the National Heritage List for England as a designated Grade II listed building.

== History ==
Grand Central Hall was opened in 1905 as the Central Hall of the Liverpool Wesleyan Mission, replacing Renshaw Street Unitarian Chapel. Built to an Art Nouveau design by Bradshaw and Gass of Bolton, the new building had a capacity of 3,576 people, and was also used from its opening until at least 1944 as the New Century Picture Hall cinema. From 1933 to 1939 the hall was the home of the Liverpool Philharmonic Orchestra while the Philharmonic Hall was rebuilt following a fire.

In 1990 the Methodists sold Central Hall. Major restoration work was undertaken in 1997/98 and from November 1998 to around 2000 or 2001 the building became the Barcelona Bar and nightclub.

After the closure of the Quiggins Centre on School Lane in 2006, a dozen of the 30 plus traders relocated to the Grand Central Hall whilst others moved on to and around Bold Street or dissolved themselves. In early 2007, Roscoe Hall on the first floor opened with many new and diverse shops. In October 2011 a performance area opened in the domed area. Known as 'The Dome', the venue has a capacity of 1,200 and was used to host film, theatre and music events.

== Current use ==
In 2018 Grand Central Hall was taken over by local business owners, who redeveloped the Hall, basements and upper floors. The New Liverpool Grand Central integrates luxury hotels with boutique bars, live music and event spaces, a wedding hall and an assemblage of restaurants making up the food-hall, The Grand Bazaar.

In early 2022, the lease holders were forced to vacate due to a reported £1.2m outstanding rent. and therefore the venue was shut for a period of time with all events cancelled.

In early 2023, the property was reopened as The Dome at Grand Central after major refurbishments bringing capacity to over 3,500. The refurbishment included renovations to sound systems, lighting, venue amenities, air-conditioning systems, and stage facilities.

== See also ==
- Grade II listed buildings in Liverpool-L1
- Architecture of Liverpool
