= Big Horn, Manchester =

Sculpture in Manchester, England

- Tib Street Horn
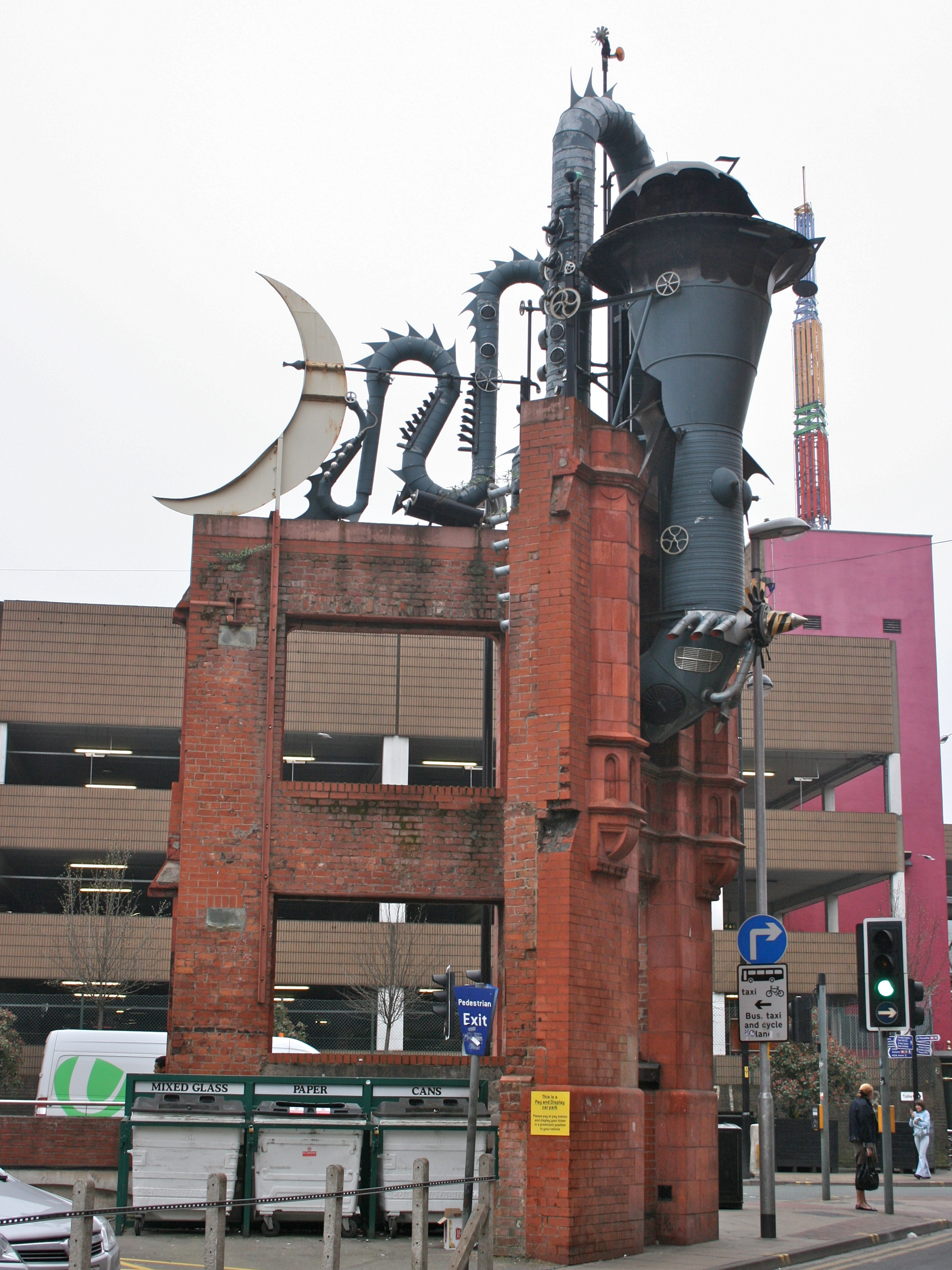
- The Big Horn sculpture in 2009
- Artist: David Kemp
- Medium: steel
- Dimensions: 10 m (33 ft) × 15 m (49 ft)
- Location: Northern Quarter, Manchester, United Kingdom
- Coordinates: 53°28′58″N 2°14′12″W

The Big Horn or the Tib Street Horn is a trombone-shaped public sculpture in the Northern Quarter of Manchester, England. It is some 10 m (33 ft) tall and is displayed on the remains of a building that once housed a hat factory. A proposed redevelopment in 2017 of this once industrial and commercial area resulted in the sculpture being taken down and put into storage, it was subsequently installed on Afflecks.

== Location ==
The sculpture is located on the corner of Tib Street and Church Street, on a site also bordered by Joiner Street and Bridgewater Place, in the Smithfield conservation area of the Northern Quarter of Manchester. Surrounding buildings include the Black Dog Ballroom, the Sachas Hotel, the Debenhams Building, Afflecks, The Light Hotel and the Birchin apartments.

== History ==
=== Mill ===
The site was originally occupied by a number of buildings, including the Rylands and Co. warehouse which was demolished in the early 1990s.

=== Sculpture ===
The sculpture resembles a trombone or serpent-like musical instrument, with attached objects. It was designed by David Kemp, a Cornish artist, and built around the corner of a former Victorian factory that produced hats. Constructed from welded steel and galvanised ducting, it is 10 metres (33 ft) tall and 15 metres (49 ft) long.

It was built as a gateway sculpture to symbolise the growth of the city's Northern Quarter. The sculpture was funded by the Arts Council through the National Lottery, Manchester City Council, National Car Parks and the Northern Quarter Association. Some changes were made to the design from the originally planned version, but it follows the artist's signature style by using scrap metal. and is part of his series of sculptures on "Unsound Instruments".

The sculpture was commissioned in 1996 and finished in 1999. It took 10 days to install on the site, with a welcoming ceremony held on 10 June 1999 that featured a piece of music that was commissioned for the event. Known as the "Big Horn" or "The Tib Street Horn", it was one of two sculptures on Tibb Street, with the other being Toy Boy, a neon light tower designed by Peter Freeman in 1998.

The section of the wall that supports the sculpture was retained when the rest of the building was demolished. The cleared area was used by National Car Parks for the parking of around 100 cars.

The artist described the artwork as:

'It's not really a saxophone, nor a dragon, coiled on the gothic stump of a Victorian hat factory. Perhaps it's a listening device, filtering the left-over sounds from the street corner below, where the past bumps into the future, shooting the lights.'

It has been described as "one of the most recognisable of the modern public art works installed in the city".

=== Redevelopment ===
Planning permission was granted in 2017 to construct 183 apartments on the site that currently hosts the sculpture. The proposed "Citu NQ" development by Salboy (a company owned by Fred Done) will also include shops and rooftop gardens on the 7th floor (open to all residents) and the 10th floor (private gardens).

The sculpture was initially offered back to the artist, but he did not want it returned. It was instead donated to Manchester City Council, and was removed and put into storage, while the remains of the building that supported it were demolished. Although there were rumours that it might be installed at a university in Manchester, it was subsequently announced that it would be installed on the Tib Street entrance to Afflecks Palace.
