= Strange Quarter, Manchester =

Informal area of Manchester and Salford

Strange Quarter
- Informal area
- Metropolitan borough: City of Manchester; City of Salford
- Metropolitan county: Greater Manchester
- Region: North West
- Country: England
- Sovereign state: United Kingdom
- Police: Greater Manchester
- Fire: Greater Manchester
- Ambulance: North West

The Strange Quarter is an informal name for a loosely defined area on the northern fringe of Manchester city centre, England, straddling the boundary between Manchester and Salford. It covers parts of Strangeways, Cheetham Hill and Lower Broughton. Its name refers to HM Prison Manchester, commonly known as Strangeways.

The area is an industrial and wholesale district. During the 2010s and 2020s, warehouses and workshops were adapted for use by independent music venues, nightclubs and studios. Venues associated with the area include the White Hotel, Hidden, the Derby Brewery Arms (DBA) and the Yard.

Manchester City Council and Salford City Council approved the Strangeways and Cambridge Strategic Regeneration Framework in November 2025. The framework covers 130 hectares and proposes up to 7,000 homes, 1.75 million square feet of commercial floorspace and a new urban park over a period of 20 to 30 years. Operators of several venues told The Guardian and the Manchester Evening News that they feared the plans would displace the area's cultural activity, a concern the councils have said the framework is intended to address.

== See also ==
- Northern Quarter, Manchester
