= Mary-Ellen McTague =

Mary Ellen McTague
- Born: Bury
- Style: British

Mary-Ellen McTague is a Manchester chef who has run two successful restaurants in the city; Aumbry and 4244.

== Career ==
Mary-Ellen McTague attended St Gabriel's RC High School and Holy Cross College in Bury but gave up studying languages at university after deciding that she wanted to become a chef.

=== Early career ===
Having previously spent time working in the kitchen of the Manchester Roadhouse making food for touring bands who played at the venue it was at the Roadhouse that McTague decided she wanted to cook for a living. She wrote to a number of restaurants and received responses from Heston Blumenthal, who wanted her to get some experience, and the Michelin starred Sharrow Bay Country House in Ullswater in the Lake District, which gave her a job cleaning rooms until an opportunity in the kitchens arose. Starting off as a Commis Chef and working her way up to Chef de Partie, it was at Sharrow Bay that McTague became the hotel's first female chef and where she also met her husband, chef Laurence Tottingham.

Following their time at Sharrow Bay, McTague and Tottingham went to America, working for a period in the Big Cedar Lodge in Missouri. On returning to England McTague wrote again to Heston Blumenthal at The Fat Duck and was given a role compiling historical research and developing dishes for Blumenthal's pub The Hind's Head. McTague remained there for four years before opening her own restaurant Aumbry in Prestwich, Greater Manchester with Tottingham in 2009.

=== Aumbry ===
Despite being set in an intimately small location Aumbry quickly became a much loved and critically acclaimed restaurant with Simon Hattenstone describing it in The Guardian as a "miracle of Lilliputian industry." and The Telegraph's Zoe Williams declaring that "From a fancy cheese puff to a potty-yet-perfect pudding, the menu at Aumbry blew my mind."

In the autumn of 2014 Aumbry closed for refurbishment and a temporary pop up restaurant called 4244 was set up in Manchester's Northern Quarter. 4244's run was initially planned for only a few weeks but was quickly extended until the end of the year and in January 2015 McTague ended speculation about the future of Aumbry by confirming that it would not reopen.

Later that month McTague announced that she would be working in collaboration with Prestwich bar Cuckoo to run a three-month residency in the venue, offering bistro food with a focus on locally sourced produce.

=== Post Aumbry ===
In March 2015 McTague's business partner and co-owner of the Manchester Roadhouse Kate Mountain, announced that she had decided to close the Roadhouse after it had been a music venue for 22 years. Days later a further announcement revealed that McTague and Mountain would be turning the site into a new city centre restaurant.

== Media work ==
McTague has appeared on two series of the BBC series Great British Menu, in 2013 and 2014. She is also regularly interviewed on BBC television and radio and has written a food column for The Guardian newspaper.

== Awards ==
McTague and her restaurants have won a number of awards. In 2012 Aumbry won Restaurant of the Year at the Manchester Food and Drink Awards and the following year she was named Chef of the Year. In 2014 McTague won the Cheshire Life and Lancashire Life Chef of the Year.

== Collaborations ==
Through her culinary work McTague has taken part in a range of creative collaborations. In 2012 Aumbry worked with Prestwich Book Festival to create a menu based on food featured in author Emma Jane Unsworth's book Hungry, The Stars and Everything. A one off menu was created and Unsworth read extracts of her book to diners at points throughout the meal. The following year the restaurant devised another menu for the book festival, this time based on Sybille Bedford's work A Legacy with readings provided by actress Julie Hesmondhalgh.

In 2015 the Manchester International Festival commissioned McTague to create a magical food event to celebrate the 150th anniversary of the publication of Alice's Adventures in Wonderland, with tickets selling out in minutes. Participants were given a behind-the-scenes visit of Manchester Museum with culinary adventures in each room.
