= Quiggins =

Indoor market in Liverpool, England

Coordinates: 53.4045°N 2.9844°W

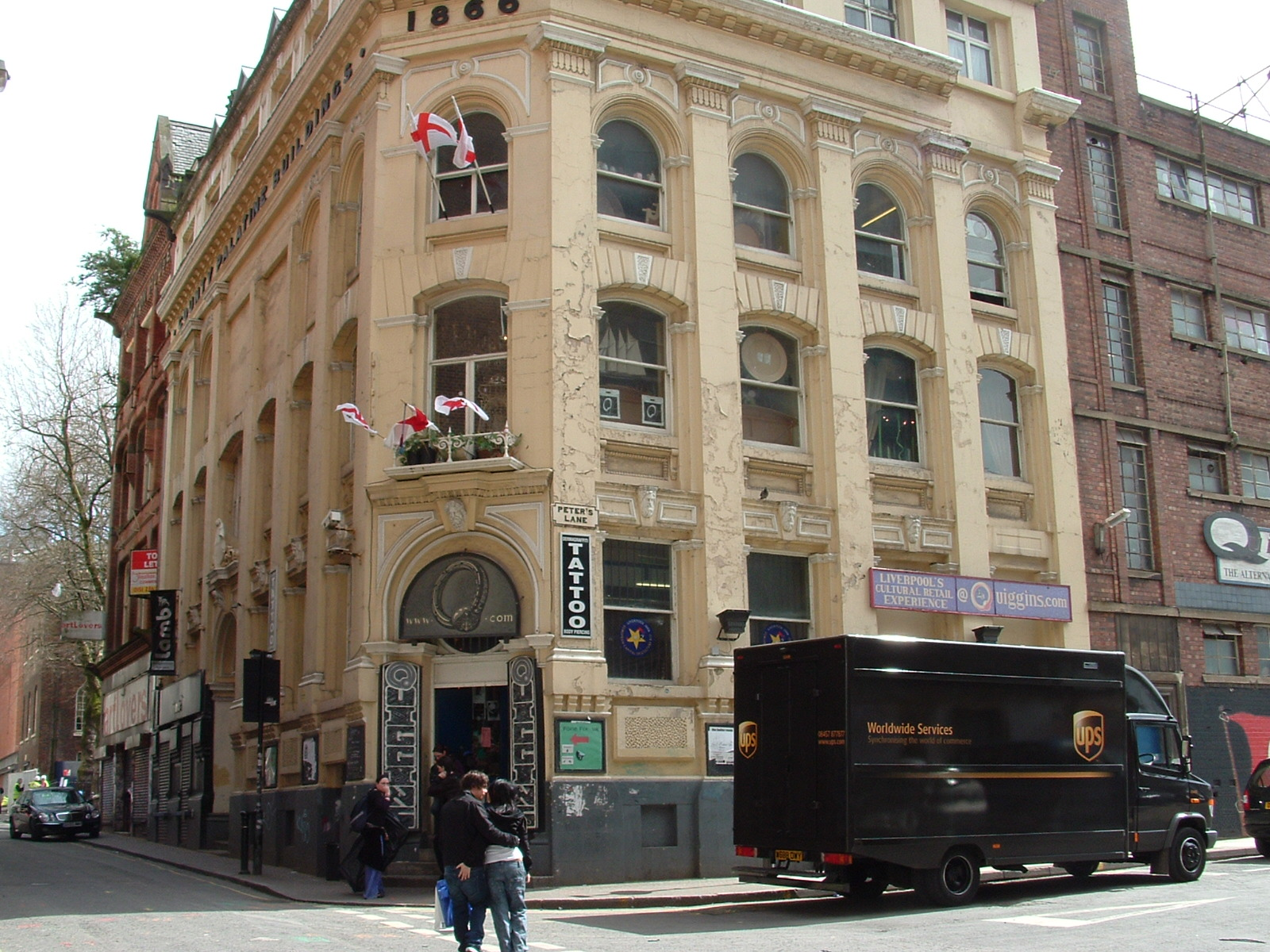
Quiggins' main entrance through the 1866 Palatine Building. The attached rear warehouses were demolished in 2007 but the front facade survives within the new Grosvenor complex.

Quiggins was an indoor market within Liverpool city centre. The market, which was home to many small 'alternative' stores, was located in adjacent three warehouse buildings on a site between School Lane, Peters Lane and College Lane. The main entrance was through the 1866 Palatine Building. Although Quiggins markets existed at several locations within Liverpool, these premises were the most well known in the city.

The market closed in 2006 in order to be redeveloped as part of a massive development of Liverpool City Centre by the Grosvenor Group.

== History ==
The business's first location was on Renshaw Street which opened in 1986, where it adopted the name of the long established architectural ironmongers which had formerly owned the premises and whose sign still adorned the shop front. Originally established as an antiques business, it outgrew the building and in 1988 moved to a larger location on School Lane. With parts of the building rented out to other antique traders, it later diversified into providing space for specialist and alternative stores where many of the stall holders were local artists and craftsmen. There Quiggins soon became a significant part of Liverpool's cultural scene. Next to the Bluecoat Centre and only two blocks from the busiest pedestrian traffic on Merseyside, it was seen as an ideal place to trade and congregate.

It was also the home of "Fraggle Radio", an internet based station streaming rock and punk music founded by Dave Carter and Terry Harris, and the popular Brook Café provided a late night venue for live alternative music.

== Closure ==
As part of its Capital of Culture bid, Liverpool City Council drew up the Bluecoat Triangle plan, later to become the Paradise Street Development Scheme, to boost the retail and cultural areas in the city centre, one aspect of which was the proposed acquisition of the building containing Quiggins Centre. Many local residents and businesses lodged objections to these proposals. A well-publicised four-year public relations and political campaign spearheaded by Quiggins co-owner and founder, Peter Tierney was launched against the plans. These included a protest march, a petition with over a hundred and fifty thousand signatures presented to Parliament, letter writing and media events, etc.

A Public Inquiry was held in September to November 2003, at which fifty objectors to the scheme were heard, Quiggins being prominent among them. Noted barrister specialising in planning issues, Mr Robert McCracken QC led for Quiggins; Mr. David Elvin QC for Liverpool Council and Grosvenor Estates. On the Quiggins' team were Peter Tierney (also known as Peter Quiggins), 'Save Quiggins' campaign manager, researches, urban renewal consultants, planning consultants and other experts and supporters.

Following the hearing, the Planning Inspector, Derek Mumford upheld the proposed CPOs and on 18 May 2004, the development scheme was approved by John Prescott, the British Deputy Prime Minister. This resulted in the issuance of CPOs against several businesses in the development area, including that of Quiggins. A further vigorous campaign was launched in the Spring of 2006 by the owners Quiggins and its supporter. However last-ditch negotiations between the partners and with the developer, Grosvenor Estates in June 2006, apparently led to a hostile take over by the younger brother which contributed to collapsing the Quiggins' challenge.

The CPO was then executed, which reputedly granted Quiggins a compensation claim of £1.2M before legal costs and tax. On 1 July 2006 Quiggins closed its doors for the last time at the School Lane site. By early 2007 the buildings had been demolished except for the retained ornate facade at the corner of School Lane (Palatine Building) which has been re-used by the Liverpool One development as part of a street of boutiques between Church Street and Paradise Street which opened in late 2008.

== Later development ==
Following the compulsory purchase and closure of the School Lane site a number of store owners re-opened at the Grand Central Hall in Renshaw Street, under the banner "Quiggins at Grand Central", retaining the alternative store/indoor market ethos. Sadly though, this building's operations as Quiggins had ceased in 2018, the site Grand Central Hall is currently 'The New Liverpool Grand Central Hotel' (this closure was spearheaded by the Smokie Mo's landowners).

Meanwhile, in late 2006 Peter Tierney opened 'Quiggins AttiQue' in Aigburth, South Liverpool, and continues trading from there while planning a return to Liverpool City Centre retailing. Continuing its ethos of helping small independent businesses gain a strong foothold under the "Quiggins" banner, it had long been Quiggins' intention to acquire the lease to the John Lewis Store (formerly George Henry-Lee) on Church Street, and lengthy negotiations took place with Grosvenor and City Council in an attempt to achieve this. However an announcement on 1 October 2007 declared that Rapid Hardware would take over the premises in 2011.

In May 2012 Tierney stood as National Front candidate in the Liverpool Mayoral elections, polling 566 votes. In November that year the traders at Grand Central dropped "Quiggins" as part of their title, though a spokesman claimed this was an unrelated action.

== See also ==
- The Paradise Project
- Grosvenor Group
- Affleck's Palace - a similar centre in Manchester
