= Wesleyan Methodist Church (Great Britain) =

Former major Methodist movement in Britain

- Scallop shell, a symbol of Wesleyan Methodism derived from the Wesley family coat of arms
- Classification: Protestant
- Theology: Wesleyan
- Governance: Connexionalism
- Region: Great Britain
- Founder: John Wesley
- Origin: 1730s (Evangelical Revival)
- Independence: 1790s
- Branched from: Church of England
- Separations: Methodist New Connexion (1797)
- Merged into: Methodist Church of Great Britain
- Defunct: 1932 (Methodist Union)
- Other name: Wesleyan Methodist Connexion

The Wesleyan Methodist Church (also named the Wesleyan Methodist Connexion) was the majority Methodist movement in England following its split from the Church of England after the death of John Wesley and the appearance of parallel Methodist movements.

The word Wesleyan in the title differentiated it from the Welsh Calvinistic Methodists (who were a majority of the Methodists in Wales) and from the Primitive Methodist movement. The Wesleyan Methodist Church followed John and Charles Wesley in holding to an Arminian theology, in contrast to the Calvinism held by George Whitefield, by Selina Hastings, Countess of Huntingdon (founder of the Countess of Huntingdon's Connexion), and by Howell Harris and Daniel Rowland, the pioneers of Welsh Methodism. Its Conference was also the legal successor to John Wesley as holder of the property of the original Methodist societies.

== Name and origins ==
The name "Wesleyan" emerged as early as 1740 to distinguish John Wesley's followers from other Methodists, such as "Whitefieldites" and the Countess of Huntingdon's Connexion. But it did not come into more general and formal use until early in the 19th century, when it served to differentiate the "Original Connexion" from its offshoots and, in Wales, from Calvinistic Methodism. Broadly, the term Wesleyan (in the sense of "deriving from the Wesleys") has been used to describe Methodist theology held by almost all contemporary Methodist groups in England and America.

== History ==
Although it was not his intention to establish a new Christian denomination, John Wesley's clandestine ordinations in 1784 (Note: The refusal by the Bishop of London to ordain a Methodist missionary for the newly independent United States of America led to Wesley (as a presbyter) taking the initiative. He was compelled by his belief in the doctrine of the "priesthood of all believers.") had made separation from the established Church of England virtually inevitable. Later in the same year, Wesley pronounced the first official Methodist Conference of 100 members, who were to govern the society of the Methodist movement after his death. In 1787 Wesley, under legal advice, decided to license his chapels and itinerant preachers under the Toleration Act 1689, albeit "not as dissenters but simply 'preachers of the gospel'". Wesley died in 1791. The estrangement between the Church of England and the Wesleyan Methodists was entrenched by the decision of the Methodist Conference of 1795 to permit the administration of the Lord's Supper in any chapel where both a majority of the trustees and a majority of the stewards and leaders allowed it. This permission was extended to the administration of baptism, burial and timing of chapel services, bringing Methodist chapels into competition with the local parish church. Consequently, known Methodists were often excluded from the Church of England, accelerating the trend for Methodism to become entirely separate from the established church.

For half a century after Wesley's death, the Methodist movement was characterised by a series of divisions, normally on matters of church government (e.g. Methodist New Connexion) and separate revivals (e.g. Primitive Methodism in Staffordshire, 1811, and the Bible Christian Church in south-west England, 1815). The original movement became known as the "Wesleyan Methodist Connexion" to distinguish itself from these groups. During the Napoleonic era, the Wesleyan Methodist hierarchy was eager to display loyalty to a government wary of radicalism, leading to a politically conservative stance among both the leadership and many members, in contrast to other Methodist groups. The 1891 Wesleyan conference endorsed the use of the term Church rather than Connexion, although it retained a connexional polity.

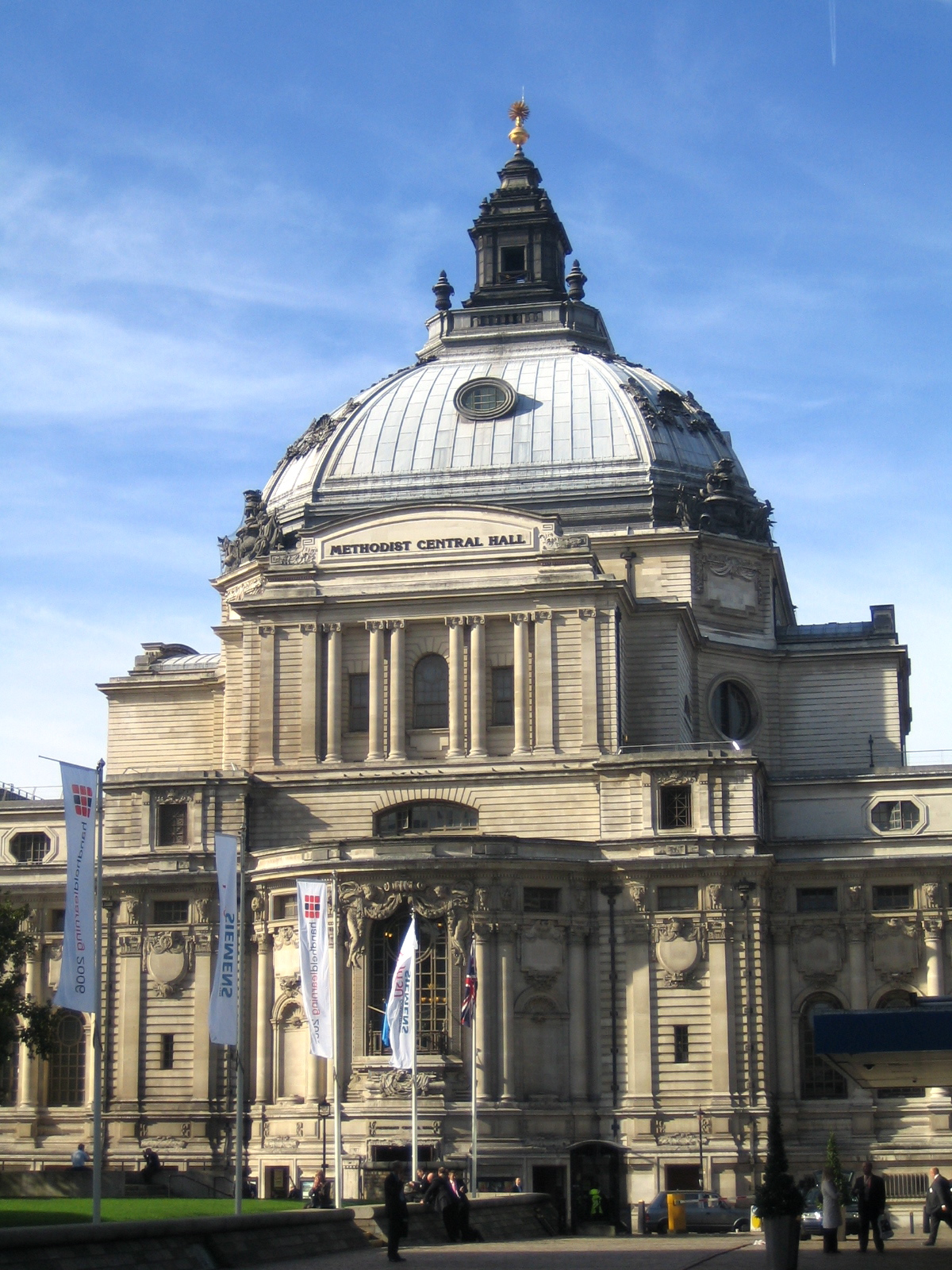
Methodist Central Hall, Westminster

In 1898, Robert Perks, MP for Louth, proposed the creation of the Wesleyan Methodist Twentieth Century Fund (also known as the 'One Million Guinea Fund') which aimed to raise one million guineas (£1.1s. or £1.05) from one million Methodists to build a Central London church to build a world centre of Wesleyan Methodism and to expand the mission of the Wesleyan Church at home and overseas. On 8 November 1898, the fund was officially launched at Wesley's Chapel in City Road, London. The fund had raised £1,073,682 by the time it closed in 1909, part of which was used to purchase the former Royal Aquarium site for the construction of the Methodist Central Hall, Westminster, and to support construction and extension of other Wesleyan Methodist churches and Sunday schools around the UK and overseas.

=== Unification ===
In 1932, the Wesleyan Methodist Church in England had 447,122 members, against a combined total of 338,568 from the Primitive Methodist and United Methodist Churches. That same year, the "Methodist Union" saw the Wesleyan Methodists reunite with these groups. The Union was driven by a desire for greater unity among Methodists and to streamline administrative structures. The resulting Methodist Church of Great Britain became the largest Methodist denomination in the country, bringing together various strands of Methodism under one organisation.

== Schools and education ==
John Wesley was convinced of the importance of education and, following the advice of his friend Philip Doddridge, opened schools at The Foundery in London, and at Newcastle and Kingswood. Following the upsurge in interest in education which accompanied the extension of franchise in 1832, the Methodist Conference commissioned William Atherton, Richard Treffry and Samuel Jackson to report on Methodist schools, coming to the conclusion that if the Church were to prosper the system of Sunday schools (3,339 in number at that time, with 59,277 teachers and 341,442 pupils) should be augmented by day-schools with teachers educated to high school level. The Rev. John Scott proposed in 1843 that 700 new Methodist day-schools be established within seven years. Though a steady increase was achieved, that ambitious target could not be reached, in part limited by the number of suitably qualified teachers, mostly coming from the institution founded in Glasgow by David Stow. The outcome of the Wesleyan Education Report for 1844 was that planning began for permanent Wesleyan teacher-training college, resulting in the foundation of Westminster Training College in Horseferry Road, Westminster in 1851, with the Rev. Scott as its first principal.

== Gallery ==
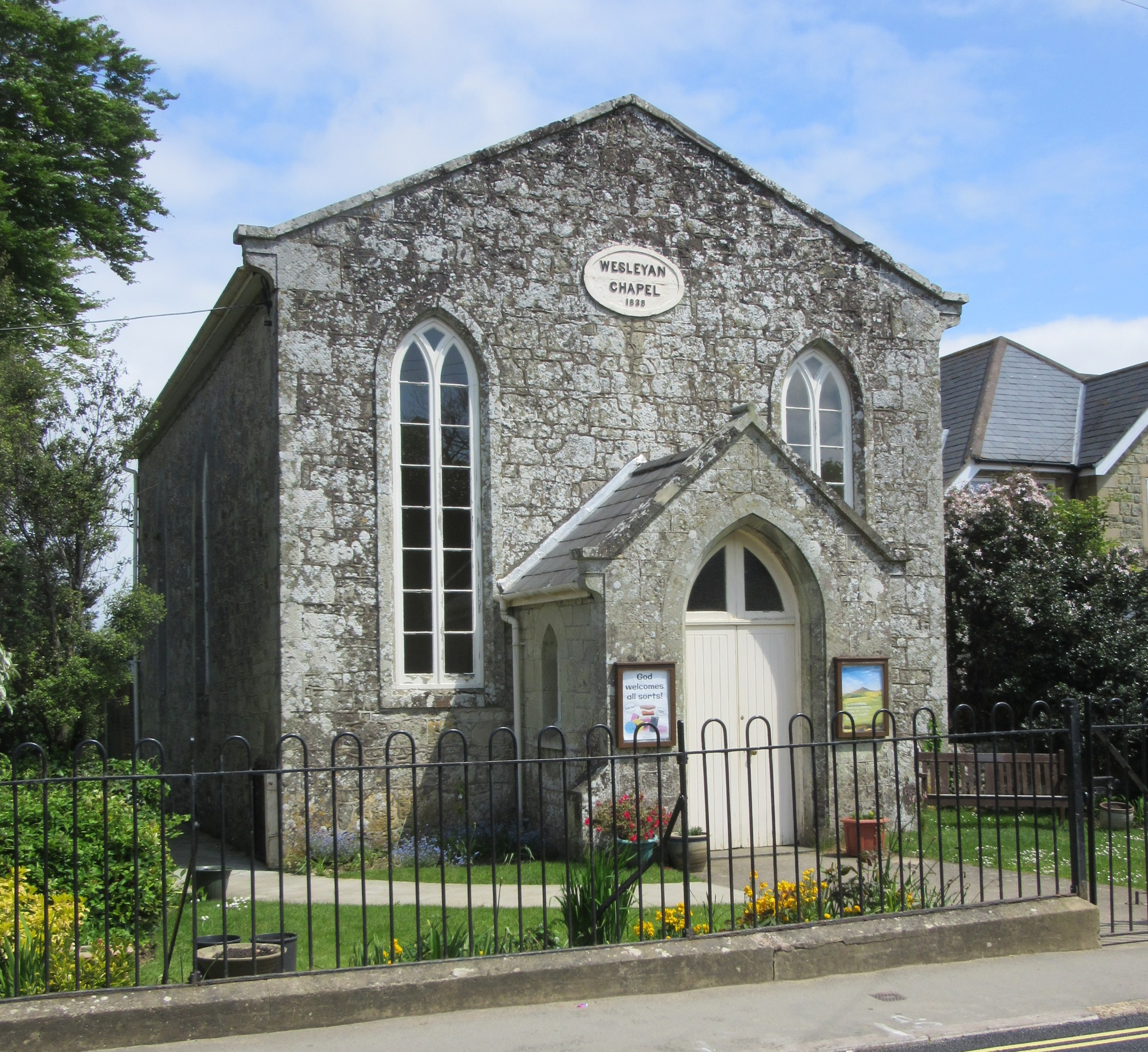
A typical smaller Methodist chapel in Godshill, Isle of Wight. Built in 1838 as a Wesleyan chapel; now Grade II-listed.

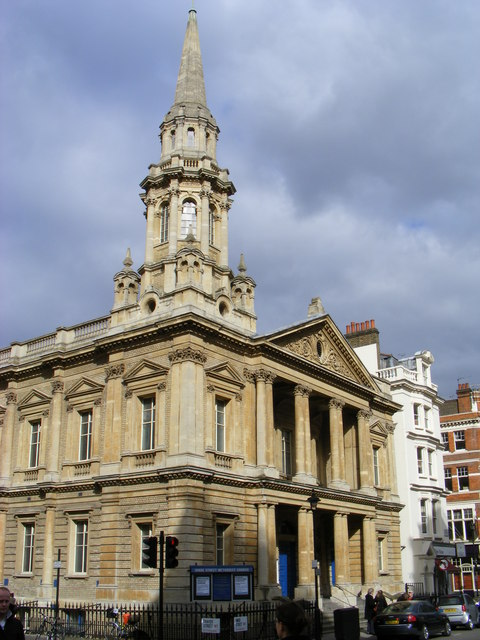
Hinde Street Methodist Church in London, home of the West London Mission. Built 1807-10 and rebuilt in the 1880s; now Grade II-listed.

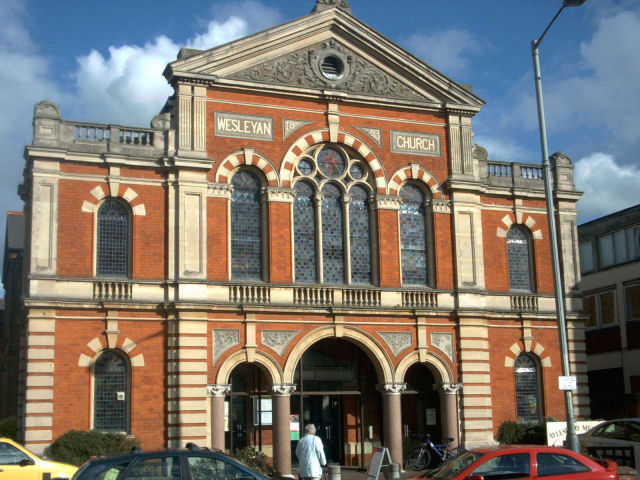
Aylesbury Methodist Church. Built in 1893 as a Wesleyan church.

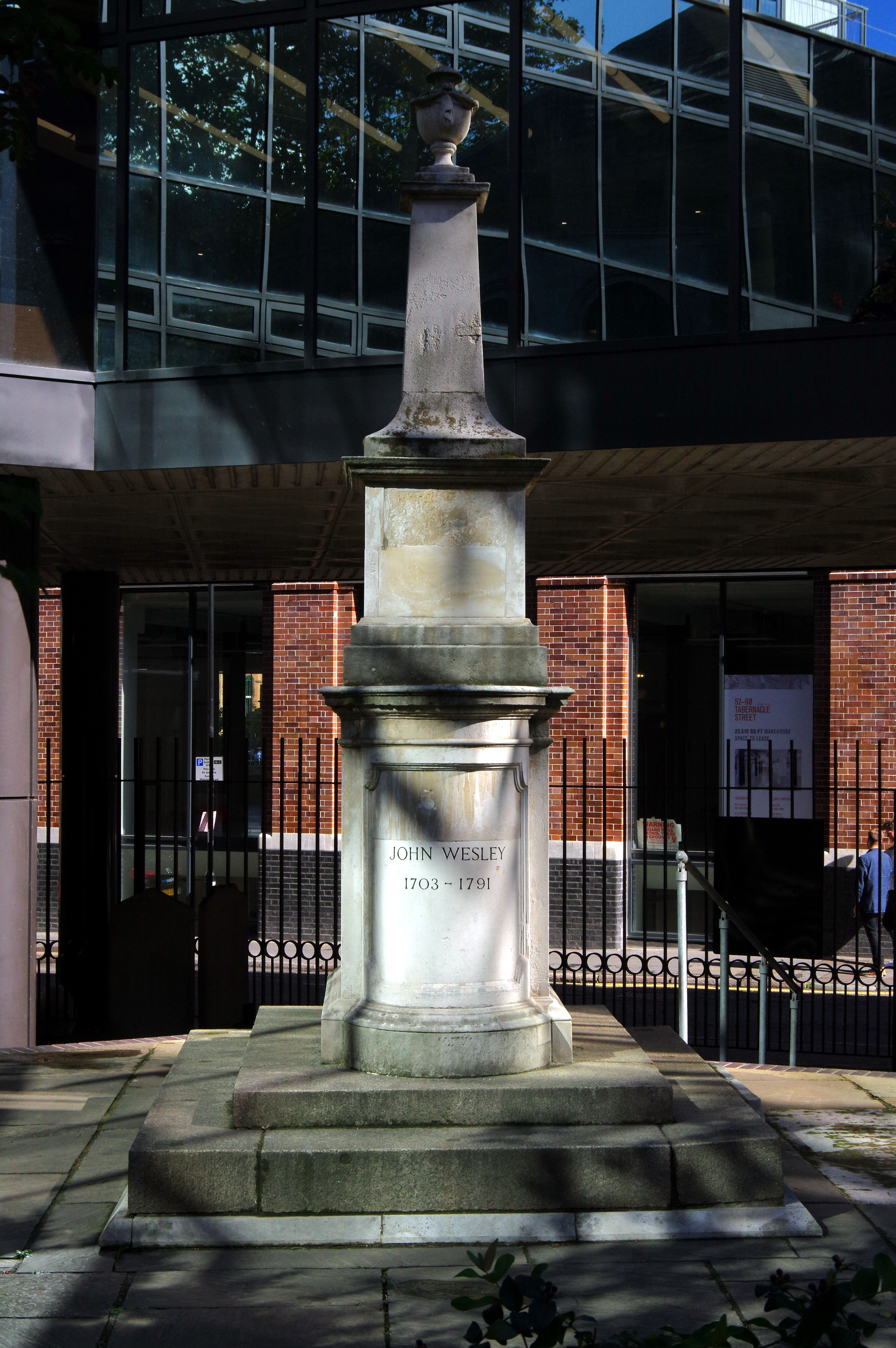
Tomb of John Wesley at the City Road Wesleyan Methodist chapel

== See also ==
- List of presidents of the Methodist Conference
- English Wesleyan Mission (Wesleyan Mission Society)
- Manchester and Salford Wesleyan Methodist Mission
- Wesleyan theology § Background
- The Sunday Service of the Methodists
