= Afflecks =

Indoor market in Manchester, England

Coordinates: 53°28′57″N 2°14′10″W

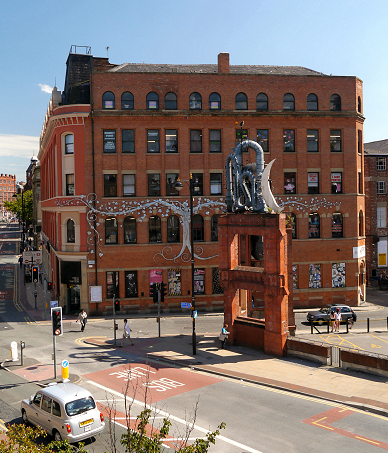
Affleck's with the Tib Street horn in the foreground, Northern Quarter

Afflecks (formerly Affleck's Palace) is an indoor market in Manchester, England, in the city's Northern Quarter on the junction of Church Street/Tib Street and Dale Street with Oldham Street. Dozens of independent stalls, small shops and boutiques operate in the one building. The building was once home to Affleck & Brown, one of the city's principal department stores. A bar on the original site opened in 2015, under the Affleck & Brown name.

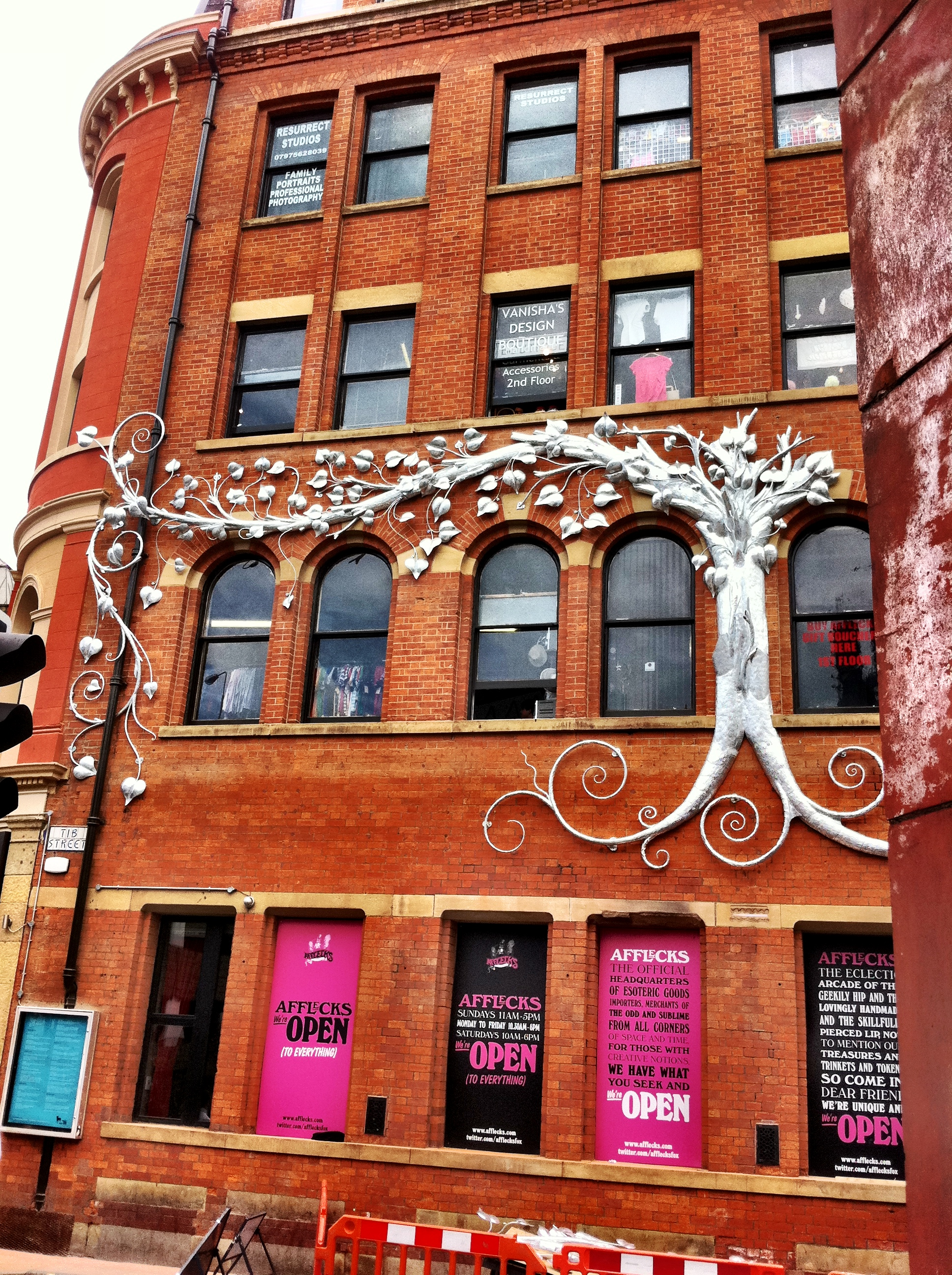
The Tib Street side of the building, June 2011. The artworks and mosaics have been removed and replaced with boarding displaying details about the store. The silver tree was a new installation in 2011

== Affleck & Brown history ==
Affleck & Brown was started in the 1860s as a drapery business in Oldham Street. The store grew to occupy a whole block between Oldham Street, Church Street and Tib Street and become a full flung department store. The business had a good reputation as a credit draper and was known for a good range of cloth for home dressmaking as well as a furrier.

The business started to decline after the Second World War as shopping moved away from Oldham Street, and in the 1950s Debenhams added the store to their portfolio. Debenhams also owned another Manchester department store, Pauldens, and the continued decline of the area led to the closure of Affleck & Brown in 1973.

== Affleck's Palace early history ==
Affleck's Palace first opened in 1982 by James and Elaine Walsh with an ethos of offering a safe environment for entrepreneurs to start out with affordable rent and no long-term contracts. Unit holders operated under a licence agreement which allowed them to pay for space on a week by week basis. The atmosphere and colourful maze-like layout led to Affleck's becoming a mecca for alternative culture. The establishment was able to bounce back from two building fires and overcame many obstacles.

During the 1990s 'Madchester Summer of Love' period, when local bands such as the Stone Roses, Happy Mondays and Inspiral Carpets were at the height of their popularity, Affleck's Palace was a fashionable place to get oversized flared jeans and tie dyed T-shirts and 'Eastern Bloc' was a popular record shop as it dealt in all the latest underground dance tunes.

== Modern history ==
On 31 March 2008, Affleck's Palace ceased trading. It re-opened on 1 April 2008 as Afflecks under new management. Afflecks is now managed by Mancunian property developer Bruntwood after the expiry of a 25-year lease in 2007. It had been previously suggested that Bruntwood would redevelop the building, possibly leading to its closure as a market, with many traders having feared that closure would be likely and that notice could have been given as soon as the end of January.

Following the change in management a representative of the property developer is quoted as saying:

Never in our 30-year history have we bought one of our customers' businesses but Afflecks is a Manchester icon that we wanted to protect. We aren't however expert in managing markets, so will look for a suitable long term owner.

Afflecks Palace currently has over 73 businesses operating inside of it, the majority of which are alternative clothing, record shops and retro game shops. Afflecks also has a variety of cafes. The independent markets have continued to be popular with one million visitors in 2012. All 73 units are fully let and attract an average of 24,000 shoppers every week, including 7,000 on Saturdays.

Afflecks was damaged in July 2013 by a fire that started in the storeroom of a shop in Oldham Street, but did not close down and celebrated its 40th anniversary in February 2022.

== In popular culture ==
Hilary Mantel's short story 'The Third Rising' concerns a mother and daughter working at the Affleck & Brown store.

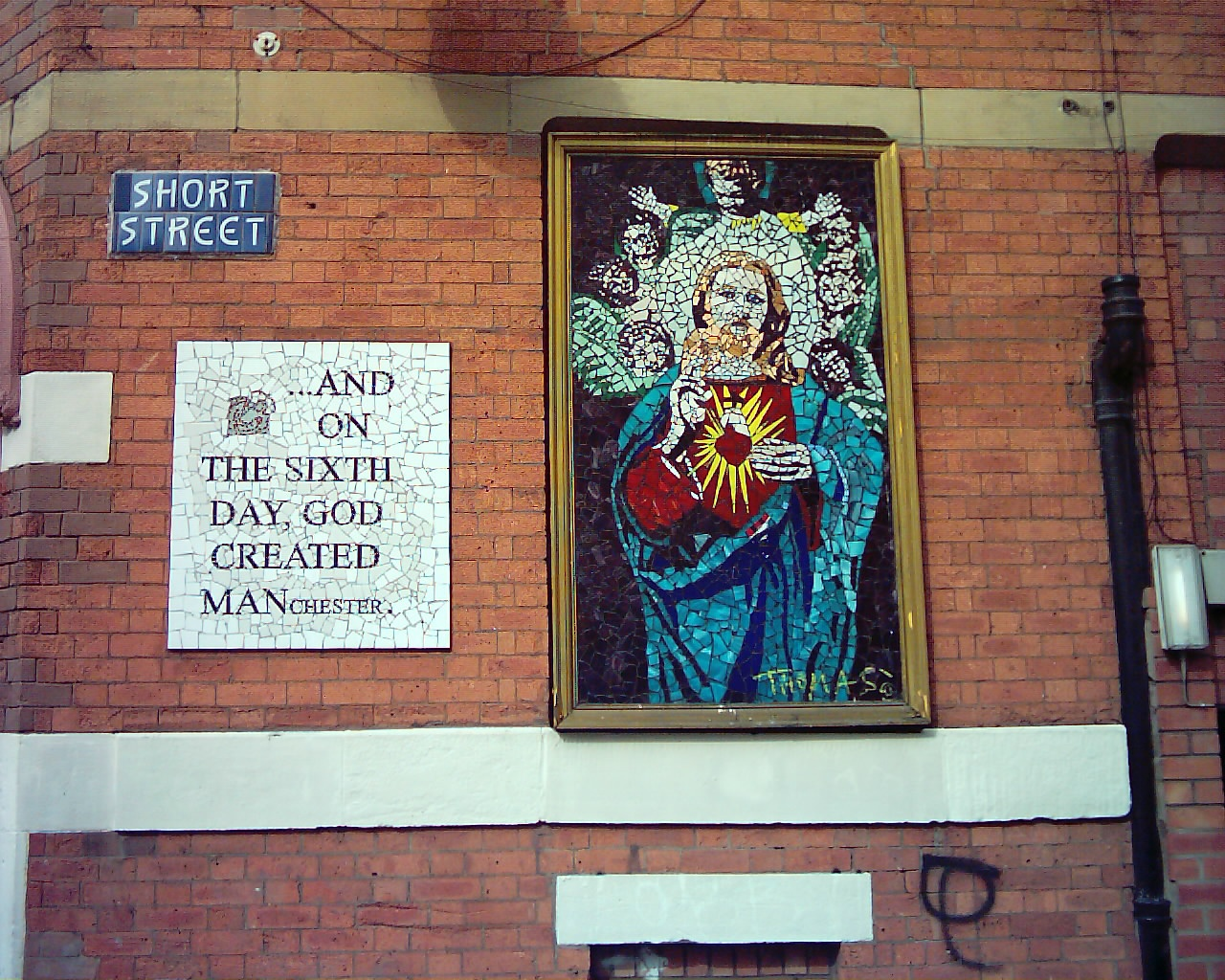
Two of the many works that formerly adorned the outside of Affleck's Palace

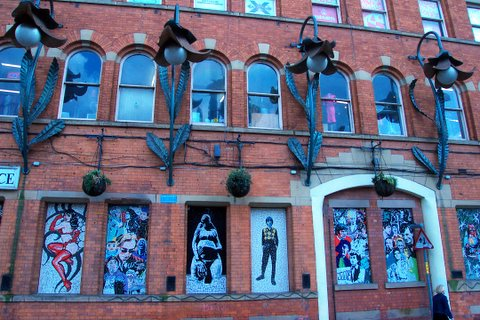
Mosaics on the side of Affleck's Palace

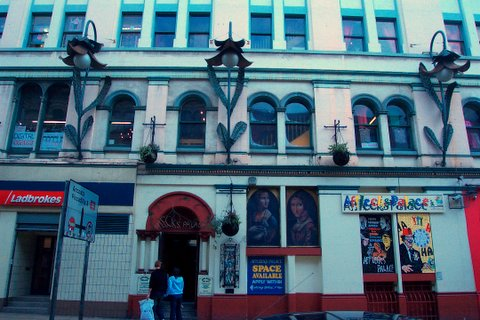
Affleck's Palace side entrance

== See also ==
- Quiggins – a similar indoor market that closed in 2006 with the redevelopment of Liverpool City Centre.
- Big Horn, Manchester – art installation now located at Afflecks
