= Oldham Street =

Street in Manchester, England

Coordinates: 53°28′58″N 2°14′07″W

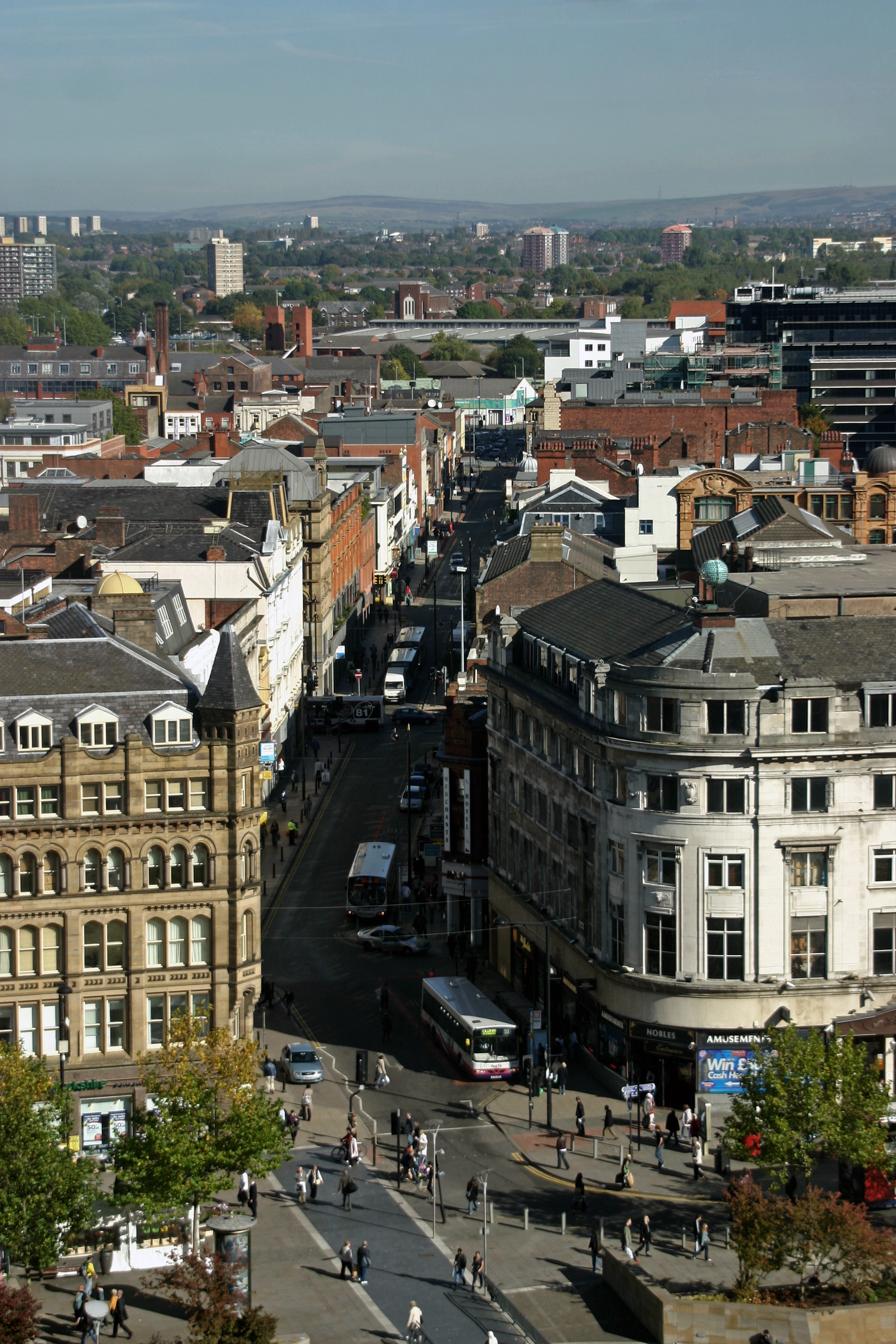
Aerial view of Oldham Street in 2007

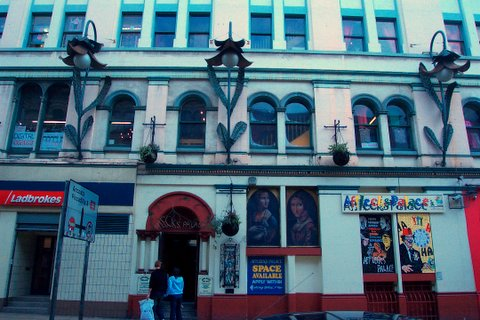
Afflecks from the side entrance in 2006

Oldham Street is in Manchester city centre and forms part of the city's historic Northern Quarter district. The Northern Quarter is dominated by buildings that were built before the Second World War.

The street runs from Piccadilly northwards to Great Ancoats Street on the edge of Ancoats, beyond which it continues further north as Oldham Road, the A62. The street is a part of Manchester which is on a tentative list as a UNESCO World Heritage Site.

The Methodist Central Hall stands on the east side.

Until the 1970s Oldham Street formed one of the principal shopping areas of Manchester city centre. However the construction of the large indoor Arndale Centre to the west during this decade saw most of the well known and long established high street stores closed or relocated.

== Entertainment and shopping ==
At the Ancoats end of the street is the Frog and Bucket Comedy Club. Further along is the independent music venue the Night and Day Café, followed by Afflecks, a multi‑storey market known for alternative and individualised fashions. Pubs on the street that also operate as music venues include Gullivers and the Castle Hotel, which stand opposite each other. There are also several retro and vintage clothing shops on the street.

In addition to its alternative fashion outlets, Oldham Street is known for second-hand music shops specialising in collectible and new vinyl, covering genres from rhythm and blues, soul, and folk to Madchester, techno, drum and bass, and dubstep.

== See also ==
- Manchester and Salford Wesleyan Methodist Mission
