= Manchester and Salford Wesleyan Methodist Mission =

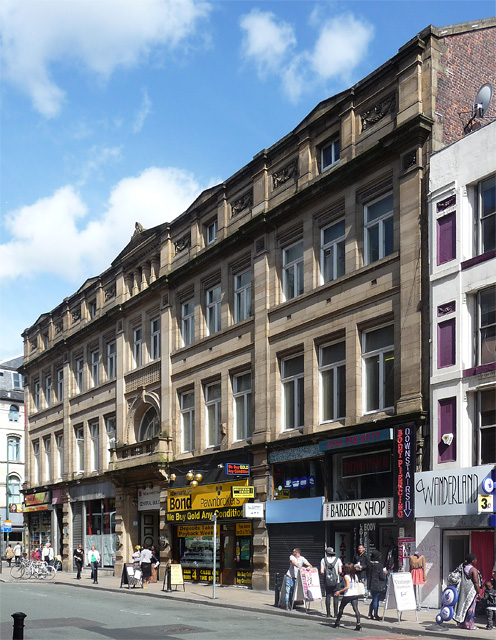
Methodist Central Hall, Oldham Street, Manchester

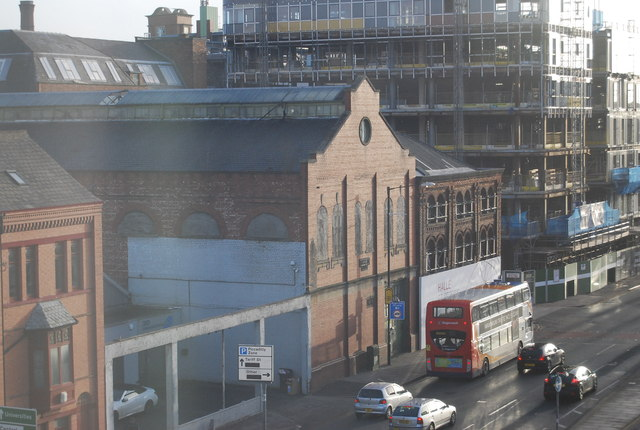
The former Wesleyan Methodist Mission building, Manchester

The Manchester and Salford Wesleyan Methodist Mission was set up in 1886 in Greater Manchester, North West England. The Central Hall building on Oldham Street became the head office for the mission. Before Central Hall was built, there was a previous chapel (called the Oldham Street Chapel), which was opened by John Wesley in 1781. John Wesley and his brother Charles Wesley were the founders of Methodism in England in 1729; the Manchester and Salford Wesleyan mission was named after them, as were many other missions (and missionaries). There were “numerous and flourishing voluntary societies to combat vice, and religious societies to enlighten the faithful”; the society set up by the Wesley brothers in Oxford in 1729 was “to prove that the decline of the religious spirit had been exaggerated”. When the chapel in Oldham Street was demolished, it was replaced by the Methodist Central Hall (which housed the Manchester and Salford Wesleyan Mission).

The objective of the mission was simple: to help anyone in Salford and Manchester who required aid and to try to give these people a better quality of life. "This mission from the beginning has existed for one definite purpose. Its aim has been to evangelise the outcast and to arouse to religious earnestness the crowds in city streets."

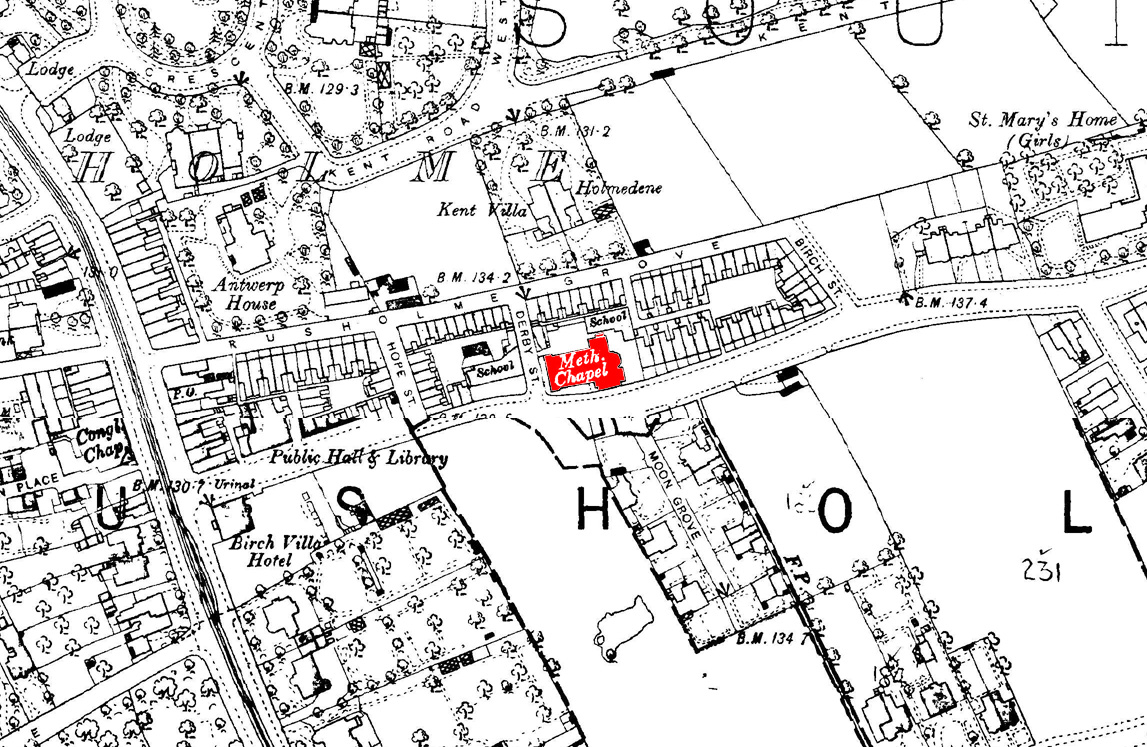
An 1899 map of Rusholme showing the Methodist chapel

To fulfill its objective, the mission needed to have more than one centre for Manchester and the surrounding areas. There were twelve sites in Manchester and Salford which were owned and used by the mission. Many of the centres (such as Victoria Hall in Daniel Street, Ancoats, and the Irwell Street chapel in Salford) were based in areas where the poor and outlaw population of the city lived. The Methodist Mission had eight workplaces, and weekly services at the chapels for men and women who struggled to find faith and a better life. The eight lines of work were:

- Home for men (50 beds)
- Labour yard for men
- Food depot
- Employment bureau
- Servant’s registry
- Preventive home for young girls (in Reddish)
- Rescue of "fallen women"
- Medical mission

The work in all these branches was voluntary; advertisements for volunteers and donations were printed to gather the help and funds needed to keep the mission running. The growth and success of the mission would not have been possible without the dedication of the Reverend Samuel F. Collier, who was the missionary minister. Samuel Collier appointed numerous men to help him run the mission, as this would have been an impossible task for him to undertake on his own. One of the men he appointed was Richard Johnson, and “the successful Sunday afternoon service at the Central Hall- usually crowded, and for the most part by working men- is almost entirely Mr. Johnson’s work”. This is an example of the dedication of the mission workers. The Rev. T. Brian Castle was employed at the Great Bridgewater Street Centre, and helped to develop one of the most successful missions in that part of the town. Henry J. Pope documented in his annual report on the mission a thank you to Samuel Collier. "We have reason to be thankful to the great Head of the Church who has raised up such a band of men to deal, as they do, with the sins and sorrows of this great city."

The Manchester and Salford Wesleyan Methodist Mission helped those in need to be forgiven of their sin and to have faith in God. Part of the mission was devoted to the rescue of "fallen women", and part was devoted to helping men find employment. The Food Depot helped feed the poverty-stricken residents of Manchester and Salford who were victims of the Industrial Revolution. All the work carried out by the sisters and ministers was not only to help people, but “everything is done to lead them to the Lord Jesus Christ”.

Central Hall was bombed during World War II; although it was rebuilt, most Mission records were destroyed. The only individual records preserved in the Manchester Archives are maternity home baptism records from 1917 to 1929 and registers from the Reddish girls' home from 1893 to 1916.
