= Northern Quarter, Manchester =

Area of Manchester, England

Coordinates: 53.482289°N 2.23435°W

Northern Quarter
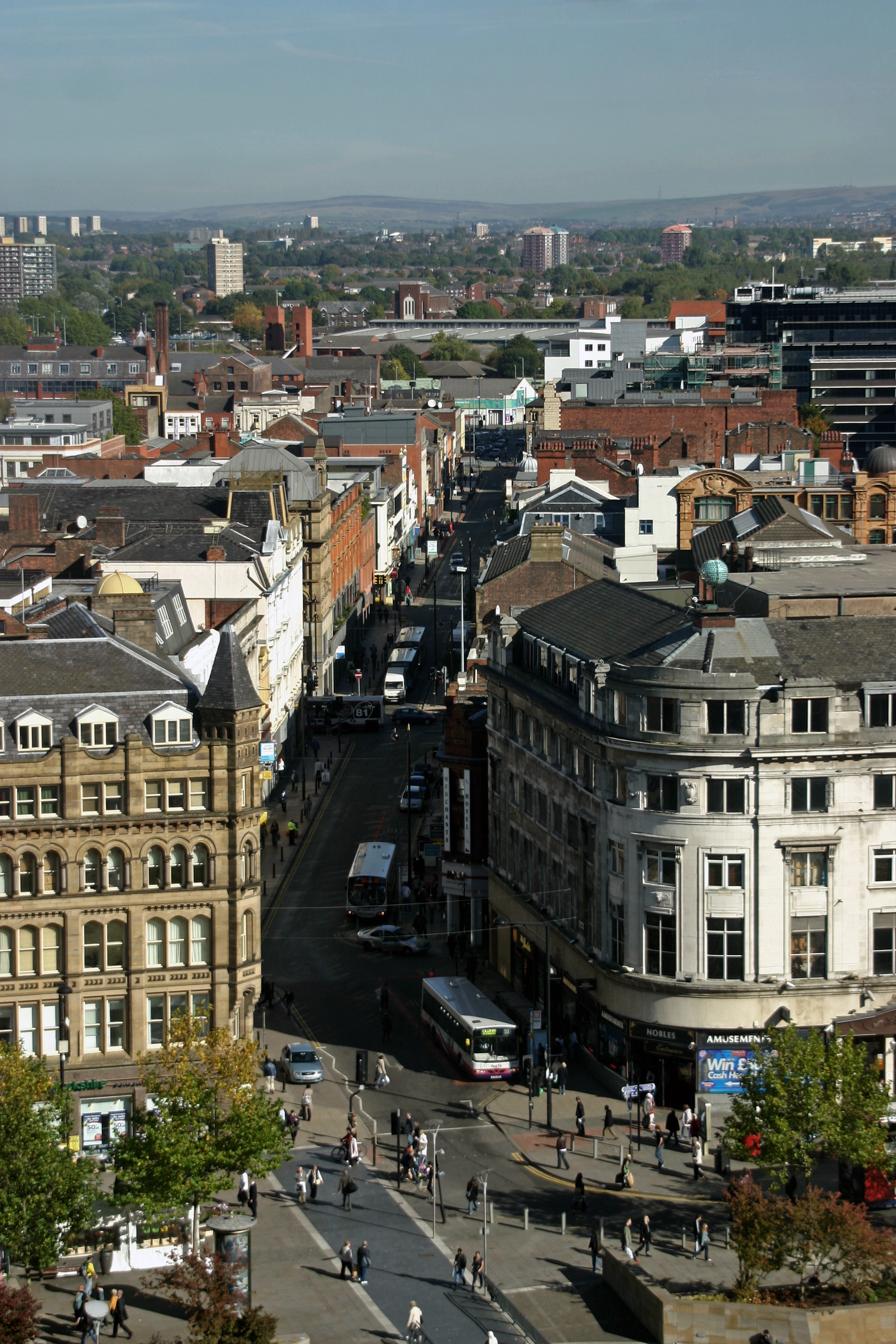

- Location within Greater Manchester
- OS grid reference: SJ844984
- Metropolitan borough: City of Manchester
- Metropolitan county: Greater Manchester
- Region: North West
- Country: England
- Sovereign state: United Kingdom
- Post town: MANCHESTER
- Postcode district: M1, M4
- Dialling code: 0161
- Police: Greater Manchester
- Fire: Greater Manchester
- Ambulance: North West
- UK Parliament: Manchester Central

The Northern Quarter (N4 or NQ) is an area of Manchester city centre, England, between Piccadilly station, Victoria station and Ancoats, and centred on Oldham Street just off Piccadilly Gardens. It was defined and named in the 1990s as part of the regeneration of Manchester.

A centre of alternative and bohemian culture, the area includes Newton Street (bordering Piccadilly Basin), Great Ancoats Street (bordering Ancoats), Back Piccadilly (bordering Piccadilly Gardens) and Swan Street/High Street (bordering Shudehill/Arndale). Popular streets include Dale Street, Hilton Street, Lever Street, Newton Street, Oldham Street, Thomas Street, and Tib Street.

== History ==
=== Early history ===
Although the town of Manchester existed from medieval times (and had previously been the site of a Roman settlement), the area now designated as the Northern Quarter was not fully developed until the late 18th century.

The area between Shudehill and Victoria station was first built upon in the 14th century, as the village of Manchester expanded as a local centre for the wool trade. Development was gradual until the mid-18th century, when Manchester increased markedly in size and significance with the onset of the Industrial Revolution.

=== During the Industrial Revolution ===
In the early 18th century, Oldham Street was apparently "an ill-kept muddy lane, held in place on one of its sides by wild hedgerows". The first town directory of Manchester, published in 1772, lists a number of buildings on Tib Street and Oldham Street. By the time of a map by William Green in 1794, the whole of the Northern Quarter is shown as a developed urban district.

It might be assumed that Oldham Street is so named because it links to Oldham Road, but this is not the case: Oldham Street predates Oldham Road, which was known as Newton Lane in the 18th century. The street is probably named after Adam Oldham, a wealthy feltmaker and associate of John Wesley, who owned the land along which the street ran and is thought to have paid for its first surfacing.

Wesley opened two Methodist chapels in the Northern Quarter. In 1751 a chapel was opened on Church Street (east of High Street at Birchin Lane, formerly Methodist Street). This was upgraded to a larger chapel on Adam Oldham's land in 1781, on the site that is now Methodist Central Hall. Wesley performed the opening of the first chapel which stood until 1883.

In the 1780s, the land owned by Sir Ashton Lever (bounded by Piccadilly, Port Street, Great Ancoats Street and Oldham Street) was sold to William Stevenson. Sir Ashton died in 1788 and Stevenson began selling off plots of land; according to Thomas Swindells the buyers' names were used to name the streets which were made at that time such as Hilton Street and Houldsworth Street and the new square was given the name of Stevenson. Manchester's first cotton mill was opened by Richard Arkwright in 1783, on Miller Street, near the junction with Shudehill. By 1816 there were 86 mills in the central area of Manchester, and by 1853 there were 108.

By the 1840s, the Northern Quarter was at the centre of one of the most significant economic changes in history, with the Industrial Revolution at full pace and Manchester taking its place as the world capital of the textile industry. In common with the town as a whole, the area became characterised by both wealth and poverty.

The area around Withy Grove and Shudehill is described by Friedrich Engels in The Condition of the Working Class in England as insanitary and down at heel, but markedly more ordered than the area around St Ann's Square, which is also described. Nevertheless, the houses are "dirty, old and tumble-down, and the construction of the side-streets utterly horrible". Engels also talks of "pigs walking about in the alleys, rooting in offal heaps".

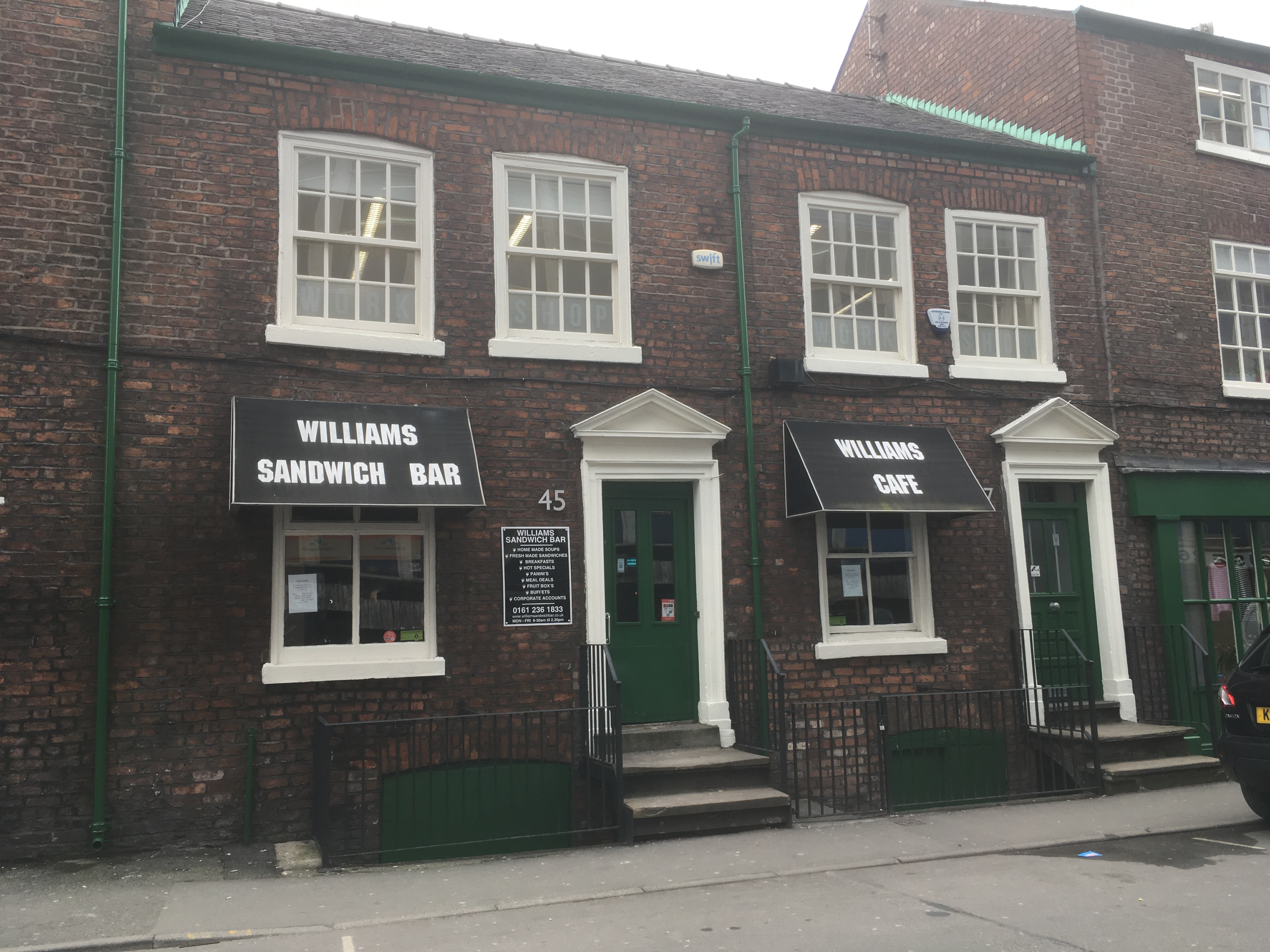
Georgian houses in Hilton Street

The area around Oldham Street seems to have been more affluent, with warehouses and shops, many of whose merchants lived within their shop premises. This is described by Isabella Varley, Mrs. Linnaeus Banks, a resident of Oldham Street, in her book The Manchester Man.

One Oldham Street shopowner mentioned by a number of writers is Abel Heywood, who spearheaded the mass distribution of books, supplying the whole country not only with penny novels, but also with educational books and political pamphlets, according to an article in the Morning Chronicle in 1849. Heywood also produced a newspaper, on which he refused to pay duty — a radical gesture, since in those early days of the British Labour Movement, taxes were used to stifle free expression. Heywood went on to become Mayor of Manchester.

=== The Victorian era ===
Enterprise continued to be the focus of the area through the Victorian age. James Middleton notes that at this time "business was conducted on the old-fashioned lines by people who had been in the street for a long time". Middleton also describes Tib Street as "a perfectly adorable street, where natural history was taught by living examples...birds, dogs, rabbits, poultry displayed in the windows or outside the shops", a tradition which continued for at least a hundred years, having only recently died out with the closing of the last surviving pet shops.

Modern writer Dave Haslam notes something of the birth of the modern Saturday night in the Northern Quarter at this time with "crowds of shoppers and sightseers...most shops were open and the main streets were lit up and packed...there was the added incentive that at midnight the food became cheaper...on a single day in 1870 it was estimated that up to 20,000 people went to Shudehill".

Throughout the Victorian era, Stevenson Square and parts of Oldham Street were known for frequent political speeches and public debates. Haslam notes that a debate in the 1830s between one Dr Grinrod, a temperance activist, and Mr Youil, a brewer, attracted around three thousand spectators.

=== Early 20th century ===
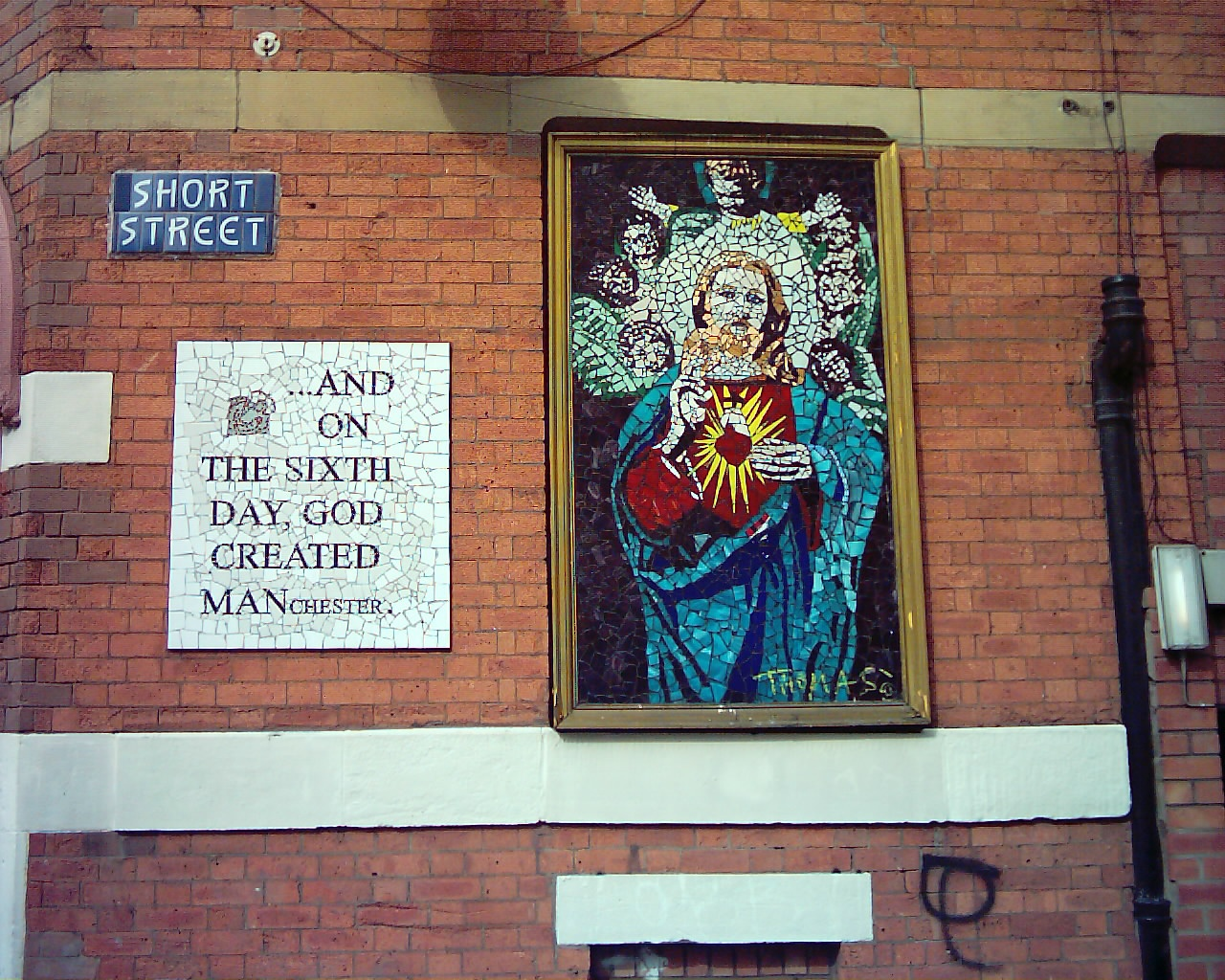
A mural on a wall outside Afflecks, in the heart of the Northern Quarter. The adjacent sign reads "...AND ON THE SIXTH DAY GOD CREATED MANchester"

The development of Smithfield Market and the continued growth of the cotton industry helped to foster economic activity in the Northern Quarter into the 20th century. Middleton describes an area buzzing with hawkers and processions.

Youth culture was the next development in the area that might be recognised today. A street dancing culture emerged in the early part of the 20th century, with "dozens of young people performing polkas, waltzes and schottisches to music provided by Italian organ-grinders".

The cotton trade reached its peak in 1912, when 8 billion square yards (6,700 km^{2}) of fabric were manufactured and sold from Manchester. Following the First World War, the high cost of British cotton, and the increase in production elsewhere in the world, led to a slow decline of the British cotton industry. In the 1960s and 1970s, mills were closing in Manchester and the rest of Lancashire at a rate of almost one a week, and by the 1980s only specialised textile production remained, although clothing manufacture and the wholesale trade continue to form a strong part of Manchester's economy.

=== Later 20th century ===
Following the Second World War, attention focused away from the Northern Quarter as Manchester began to build itself a modern city centre in the ruins left by German bombers. As a commercial area, Oldham Street became quieter, particularly as nearby Market Street and the Arndale Centre grew in importance.

In the 1970s and 1980s, the Smithfield Gardens housing estate was constructed to the west of Tib Street and the south of Foundry Lane. The estate consists of two-storey maisonettes in three-storey blocks - the middle storey is divided and provides the upper floor for the lower maisonette and the lower floor for the upper maisonette. This was the first modern residential development in the Northern Quarter.

Between the Second World War and the 1990s, the Northern Quarter was not considered to be a residential area, but since then, some of the old industrial and warehouse buildings in the area were converted into flats, as part of a wider trend for living in city centres. Although no official figures are kept (the Northern Quarter is not recognised for administrative purposes), it might be estimated that a little over 500 people now live in the area, which is split between the city centre and Ancoats and Clayton wards.

Over time, certain types of business were attracted to the area, which offered low rents and an alternative feel to the typical British high street. This became the main strength of the Northern Quarter — today it is known for hip, independent stores, cafes and bars, and for offering a distinct alternative to the shopping experiences to be found elsewhere in Manchester city centre.

For Dave Haslam, the Northern Quarter became the last refuge of the Manchester music scene in the 1990s: "A community, of sorts, had developed around music-makers wedded to experimentalism, from Andy Votel to Waiwan, nurtured at club nights such as Graham Massey's Toolshed and Mark Rae's Counter Culture ... In 1992 Frank Schofield and Martin Price (of 808 State) had lamented the fate of the independent record shop, yet within five years there were several new record shops in the Northern Quarter".

== Present ==
The Northern Quarter is popular today for its numerous bars and cafes, as well as its mix of music and clothes shops. Amongst these is Affleck's Palace, a former department store which has been turned into a multi-storey bazaar for alternative clothing and knick-knacks.

Meanwhile, the area is something of a mecca for DJs, with shops such as Piccadilly Records, Vinyl Exchange, Vox Pop Records, Beatin' Rhythm, Vinyl Resting Place, Eastern Bloc Records (formerly owned by Martin Price of 808 State, then by Pete Waterman) and, until 2009, Fat City Records (formerly run by Mark Rae).

Nightlife in the Northern Quarter includes music venues. The area is also well known for its bar scene.

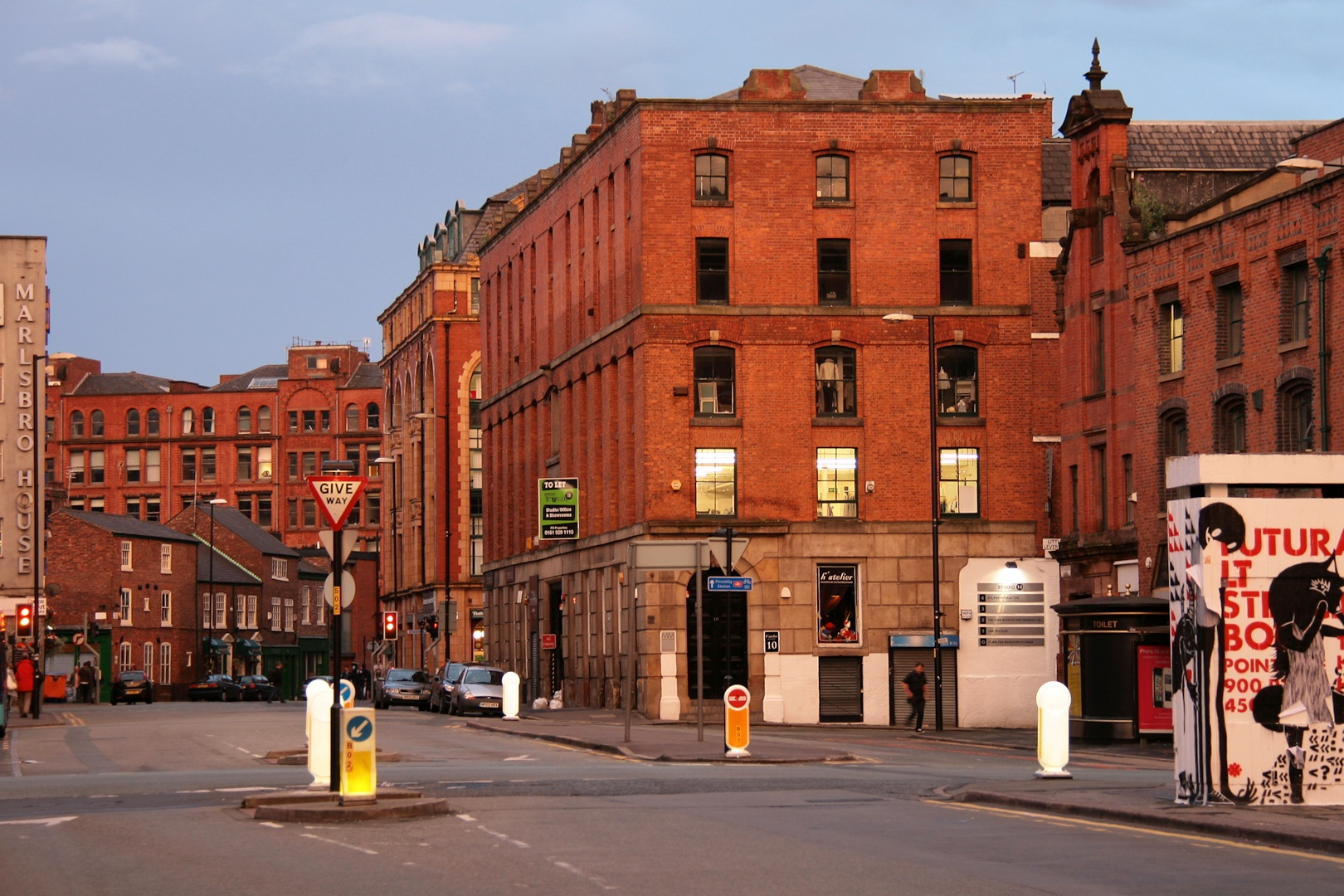
Stevenson Square

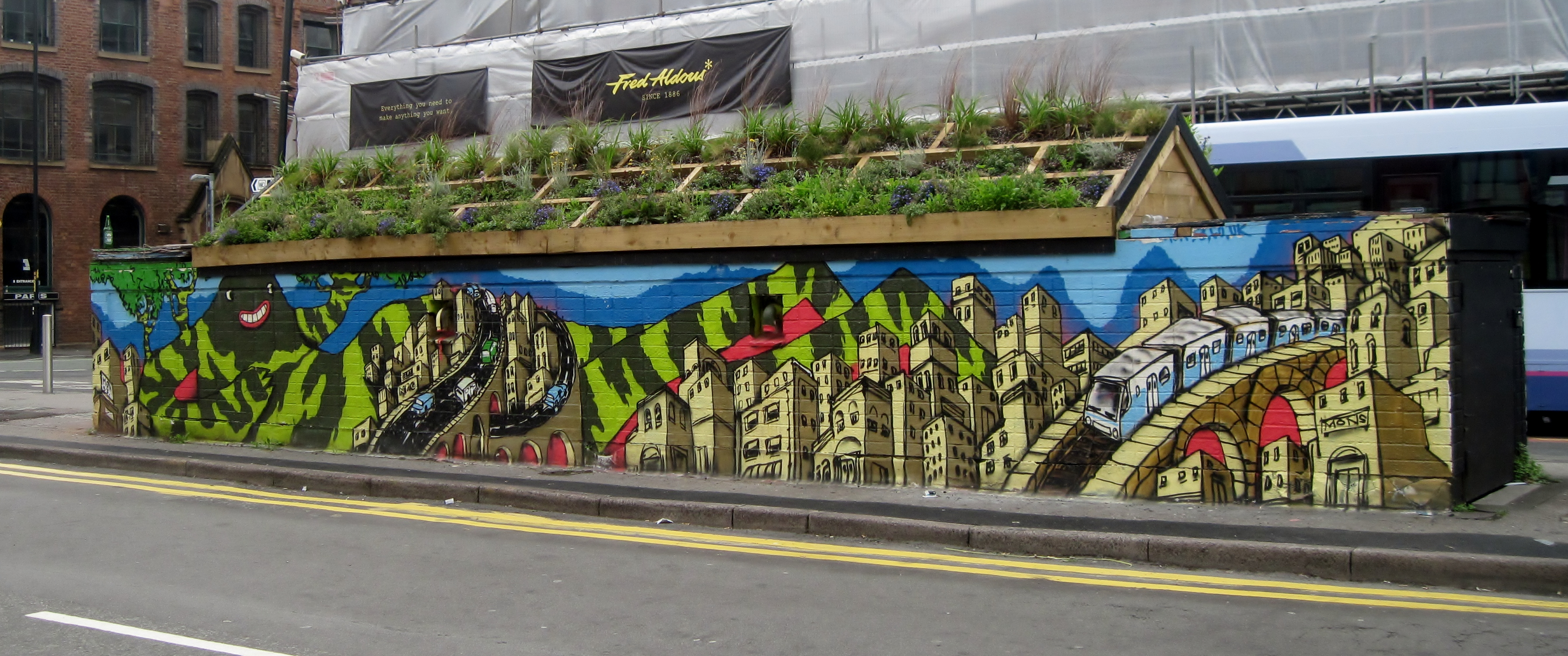
A painted fence, 2013

The area is also known as a home to the creative industries, and in particular fashion design, with various designers, agencies, and clothing wholesalers populating its back streets. There are also a number of commercial art galleries in the area and street art is on prominent display. In Stevenson Square, the street level remains of a former public convenience are used by the OuthouseMCR organisation for regularly changing examples of street and graffiti art. OuthouseMCR also manages the urban art which decorates an electrical sub-station on Tib Street. On one wall of the sub-station, protected by Perspex, is said to be a painting by the artist Banksy. The Northern Quarter also hosted the Big Horn sculpture, which was removed in 2017 to make way for the new SyNQ residential development, but is hoped to be erected again on nearby Afflecks Palace once work is completed.

Additionally, due to the area's architecture, the Northern Quarter is regularly used as a film and TV location. The area is often used as a double for New York and has appeared as Manhattan in the 2004 film Alfie, and the 2019 production Morbius. While the area around Dale Street has been used as 1940s New York for the 2011 Hollywood superhero film Captain America: The First Avenger, the 2019 Sky TV production of Das Boot. and also for the Netflix TV show, Peaky Blinders, a British period crime drama. Additionally, various parts of Manchester, many in the Northern Quarter, were used in filming Guy Ritchie's 2009 film Sherlock Holmes.

Manchester City Council have recognised the unique nature of the Northern Quarter. A 2003 planning document stated:

The Northern Quarter (N4) is strategically placed between the main Manchester retail and commercial core, Piccadilly Gateway, Ancoats and Shudehill. It represents a key piece in the city centre jigsaw, an area different in character and function to any other part of the city centre and of great strategic importance to Manchester as a city of distinctive quarters.

In November 2010, the area was awarded the Great Neighbourhood of the Year Award 2011 for Britain and Ireland at the Academy of Urbanism Awards in London.

=== Piccadilly Basin ===
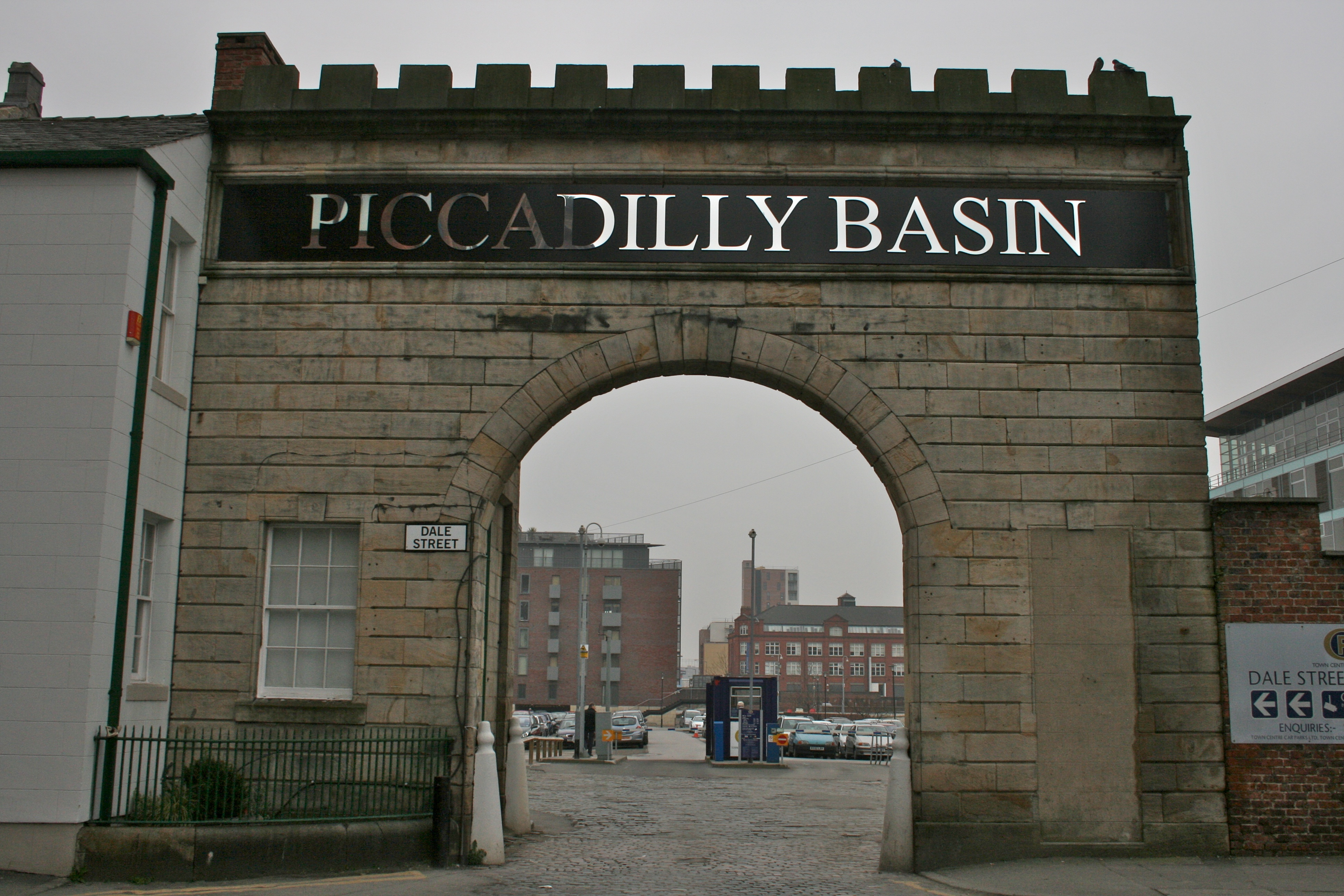
Piccadilly Basin entranceway (to a car park).

Piccadilly Basin, on the Rochdale Canal, is a redeveloped area between Manchester Piccadilly station and Great Ancoats Street. The area includes flats and offices as well as bars.

=== Shudehill redevelopment ===
Another area of redevelopment in the Northern Quarter is a mixed office and residential development centred on the old market on Shudehill near to the new Shudehill bus and tram interchange.

== In popular culture ==
- Manchester band Kid British released an EP in 2011 titled Northern Stories. Two of the tracks are "Northern Quarter" and "Tib Street".
- The area doubled for New York City during filming of the 2022 film Morbius, set in Sony's Spider-Man Universe and based on the Marvel Comics character Morbius, the Living Vampire.
- In November 2023, fashion house Chanel hosted a runway show on the streets of the Northern Quarter. The event launched the winter 2024 collection, inspired by Manchester and the Northern Quarter.

== Notable people ==
- Abel Heywood (1810–1893), publisher and alderman of the City
- John Owens (1790–1846), cotton merchant

== See also ==
- River Tib
- Strange Quarter, Manchester

== Bibliography ==
- Engels, Friedrich (1987) [1845]. The Condition of the Working Class in England in 1844. London: Penguin. ISBN 0-14-044486-6.
- Haslam, Dave (2000). Manchester, England : the story of the pop cult city. London: Fourth Estate. ISBN 1-84115-146-7.
- Middleton, James (1920). The Old Road: a book of recollections. Oldham: E. J. Wildgoose.
- Taylor, Simon; Julian Holder (2008). Manchester's Northern Quarter. Swindon: English Heritage. ISBN 978-1-873592-84-7.
