= Manchester Art Gallery =

Art gallery in Manchester, England

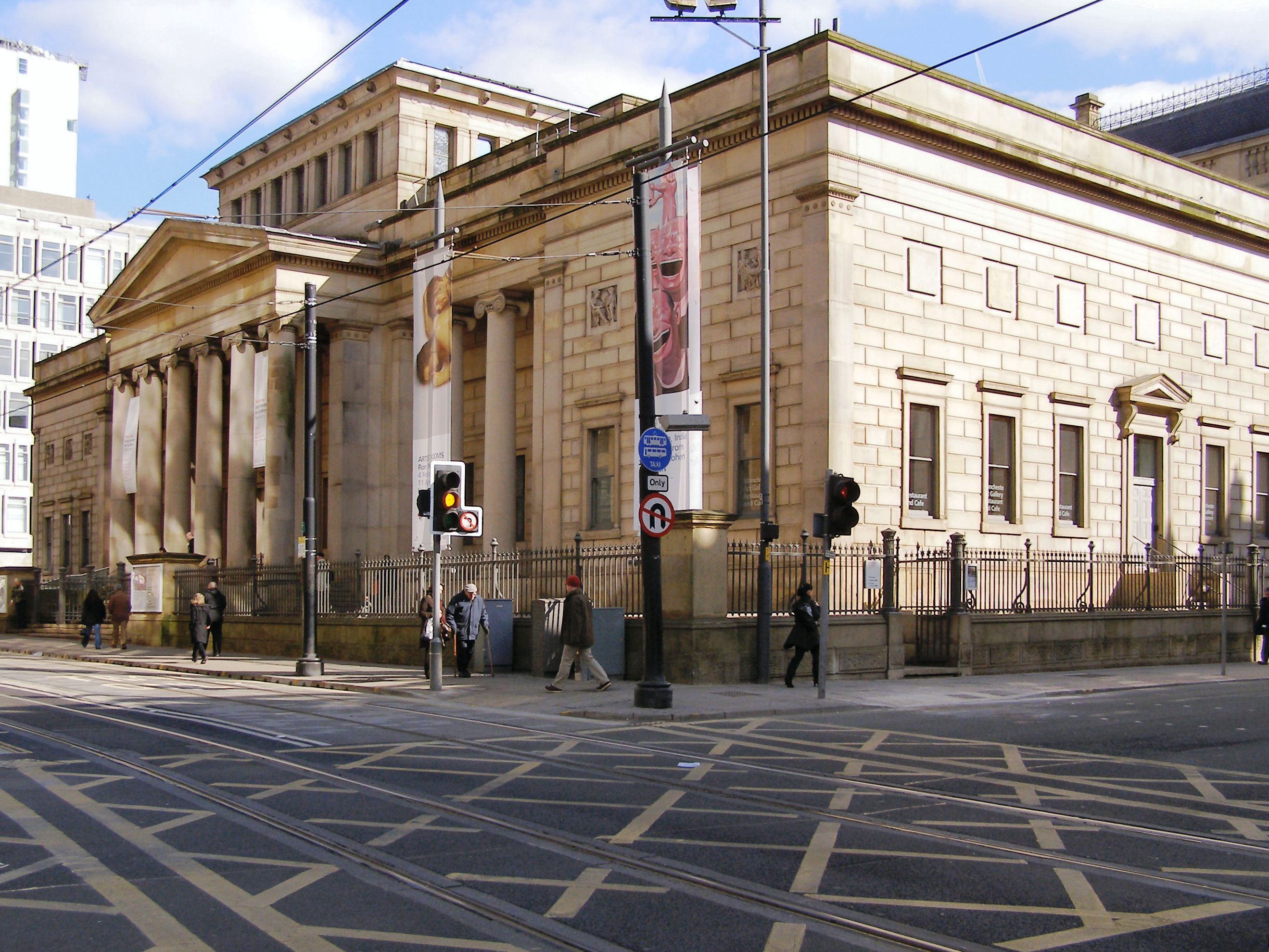
- Established: 1823; 203 years ago
- Location: Mosley Street, Manchester, England
- Coordinates: 53°28′43″N 2°14′29″W
- Collections: approx. 25,000 objects
- Collection size: 807,000 sq ft (75,000 m^{2}) in 94 galleries
- Visitors: 514,852 (1 April 2013 – 31 March 2014)
- Public transit access: Metrolink: St Peter's Square and Piccadilly Gardens stations
- Website: manchesterartgallery.org

Listed Building – Grade I
- Official name: Manchester Art Gallery
- Designated: 25 February 1952
- Reference no.: 1282980

Manchester Art Gallery, formerly Manchester City Art Gallery, is a publicly owned art museum on Mosley Street in Manchester city centre, England. The main gallery premises were built for a learned society in 1823 and today its collection occupies three connected buildings, two of which were designed by Sir Charles Barry. Both of Barry's buildings are listed. The building that links them was designed by Hopkins Architects following an architectural design competition managed by RIBA Competitions. It opened in 2002 following a major renovation and expansion project undertaken by the art gallery.

Manchester Art Gallery is free to enter and open six days a week, closed Mondays. It houses many works of local and international significance and has a collection of more than 25,000 objects. More than half a million people visited the museum in the period of a year, according to figures released in April 2014.

== History ==
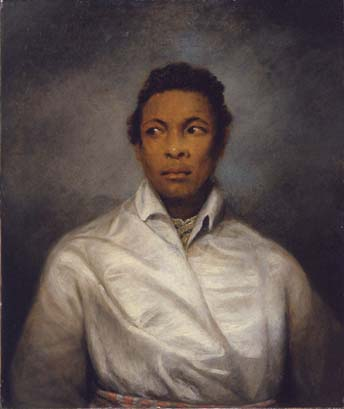
Ira Aldridge as Othello by James Northcote (1826), the first piece acquired by the gallery

The Royal Manchester Institution was a scholarly society formed in 1823. It was housed in what is now the art gallery's main gallery building on Mosley Street. The first object acquired for its collection, James Northcote's A Moor (a portrait of the celebrated black actor Ira Aldridge), was bought in 1827.

The Royal Manchester Institution opened its galleries to the public 10 years after its formation and subsequently held regular art exhibitions, collected works of fine art and promoted the arts from the 1820s until 1882 when its premises and collections were transferred under Act of Parliament to Manchester Corporation, becoming Manchester Art Gallery. The institution was handed over on condition that £2,000 per annum would be spent on art for the next 20 years. The Art Gallery Committee bought enthusiastically and by the end of the 19th century had accrued an impressive collection of fine art, added to by gifts and bequests from wealthy Mancunian industrialists.

On 3 April 1913, three women (Lillian Williamson, Evelyn Manesta, and Annie Briggs) staged a protest in favour of women's suffrage in the United Kingdom. They broke the glass of 13 paintings including two by John Everett Millais and two by George Frederick Watts. Four of the paintings were damaged by the broken glass. Williamson was sent to jail for three months and Manesta for one.

== Governance ==
The gallery is operated by Manchester City Galleries, a department of Manchester City Council which is also responsible for Platt Hall, Fallowfield.

The gallery's budget is controlled by the council but it also funded by the Manchester Art Gallery Trust, a charity (Registered Charity Number 1048581) that supports its work. The trust raises nearly half the funding required from companies, individuals and grant making trusts and foundations. The gallery is open daily, with a late-night opening until 9pm held every other month on a Wednesday.

== Architecture ==
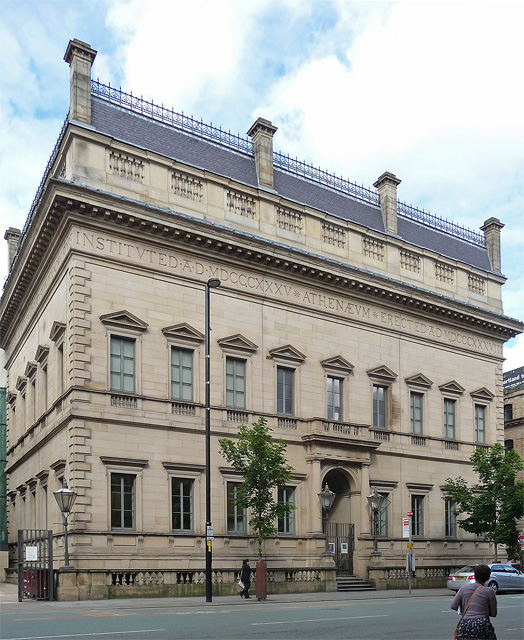
The Athenaeum, one of the three Manchester Art Gallery buildings

Manchester Art Gallery is housed in three connected buildings. The City Art Gallery building, which faces onto Mosley Street, was designed and constructed between 1824 and 1835. It originally housed the Royal Manchester Institution. Designed by architect Sir Charles Barry in the Greek Ionic style, the building is now Grade I listed. The two-storey gallery is built in rusticated ashlar to a rectangular plan on a raised plinth. The roof is hidden by a continuous dentilled cornice and plain parapet. Its 11-bay façade has two three-bay side ranges and a central five-bay pedimented projecting portico with six Ionic columns. Set back behind the parapet is an attic with small windows that forms a lantern above the entrance hall.

Manchester Athenaeum, also designed by Barry, was built in 1837 and was bought by the Manchester Corporation in 1938 to provide additional space. It is Grade II* listed and designed in the Italian Palazzo style. The Athenaeum fronts onto Princess Street.

In November 1994, an architectural design competition managed by RIBA Competitions was launched to refurbish the existing historic gallery and the Athenaeum and link them with a new building on the car park site. The competition attracted 132 architects, six of whom were selected to proceed to the final stage. Michael Hopkins and Partners were announced as winners in January 1995. The gallery closed in 1998 and reopened in 2002 following the £35 million refurbishment and extension. The new extension was criticised as "the splendid and really beautiful interiors of the original building .. have been gratuitously spoiled", and was the 2002 winner of the Sir Hugh Casson Award for the worst new building of the year.

== Collections ==
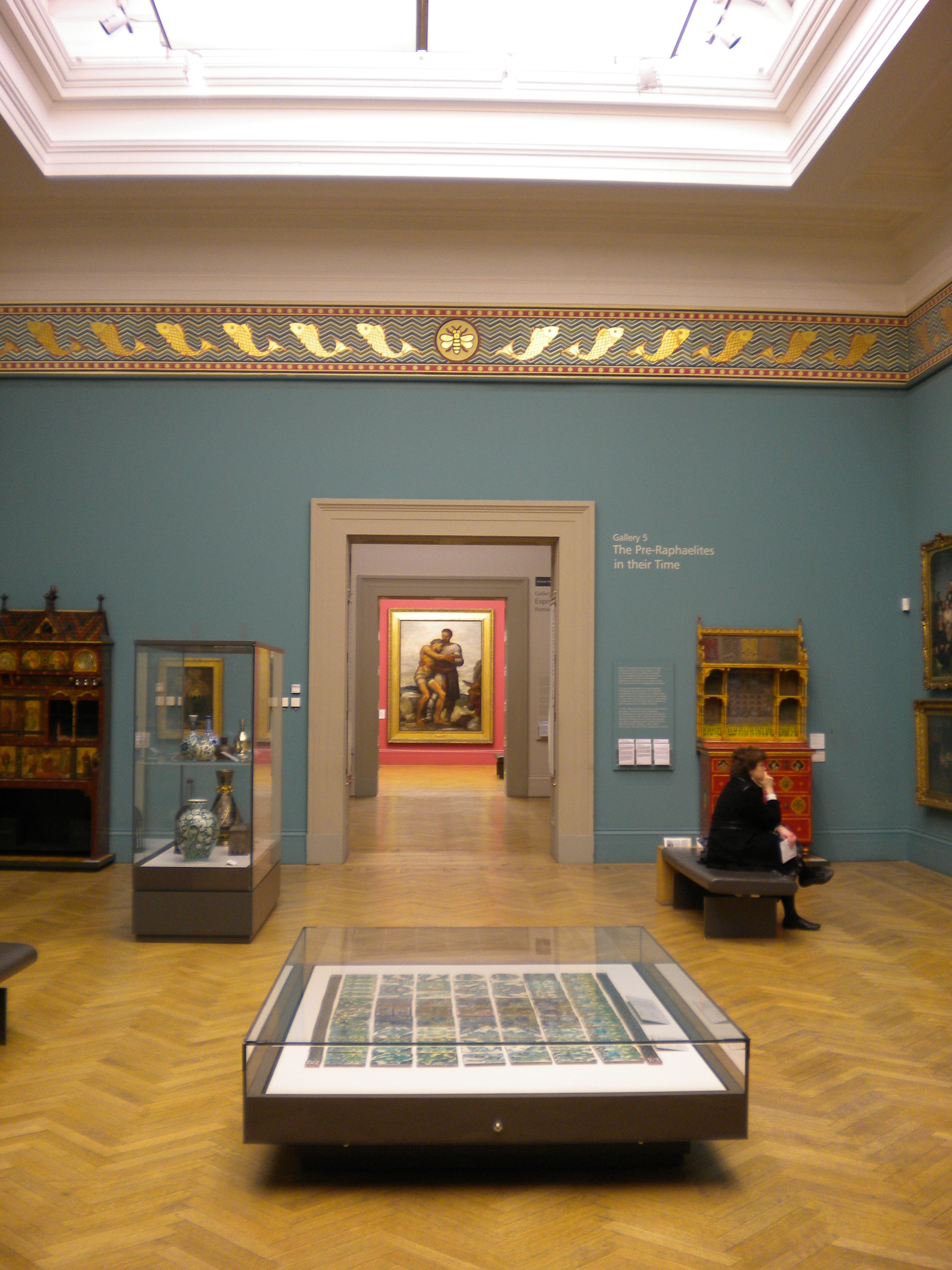
The Good Samaritan by G. F. Watts framed by doorways

The gallery has a fine art collection consisting of more than 2,000 oil paintings, 3,000 watercolours and drawings, 250 sculptures, 90 miniatures and around 1,000 prints. It owns more than 13,000 decorative art objects including ceramics, glass, enamels, furniture, metalwork, arms and armour, wallpapers, doll houses and related items. The oldest object is an Egyptian canopic jar from circa 1100 BC.

Thomas Coglan Horsfall's eclectic collection from the Manchester Art Museum in Ancoats Hall was absorbed into the gallery when the museum closed in 1953.

Manchester Art Gallery is strongest in its collection of Victorian art, especially that of the Pre-Raphaelite Brotherhood, and Victorian decorative arts.

The gallery houses several works by the French impressionist, Pierre Adolphe Valette, who painted and taught in Manchester in the early years of the 20th century; some of his scenes of foggy Manchester streets and canals are displayed. A Cézanne hangs in the same room, showing the similarity in treatment and subject between his misty French river bridge and Valette's bridge in a pre-Clean Air Act Mancunian fog. L. S. Lowry was one of Valette's students and the influence on Lowry of impressionism can be seen at the gallery, where paintings by the two artists hang together. While most locally held Lowry works are in the collection of The Lowry gallery, 3.75 kilometres (2.33 mi) away in Salford, the Manchester Art Gallery has Lowry's 1954 painting Piccadilly Gardens on display.

The museum houses The Picnic (1908), a work by the British Impressionist painter Wynford Dewhurst, who was born in Manchester. Annie Swynnerton who was born in Hulme is represented in the collection by 16 paintings and her contemporary at the Manchester School of Art, Susan Dacre by 17 paintings.

As well as paintings, the museum holds collections of glass, silverware and furniture, including four pieces by the Victorian architect and designer William Burges.

In January 2018, the gallery took down John William Waterhouse's Hylas and the Nymphs (1896), leaving an empty space to encourage debate as to how women's bodies should be displayed. Post-it notes were provided for visitors to air their views. The gallery's actions prompted a strong backlash with accusations of censorship, puritanism and political correctness. The museum was "completely taken by surprise by the ferocity of the response" and the painting was rehung after a week's absence. The removal came two months after an unsuccessful campaign to have the Metropolitan Museum of Art remove a painting by Balthus of an adolescent girl.

=== Collections highlights ===
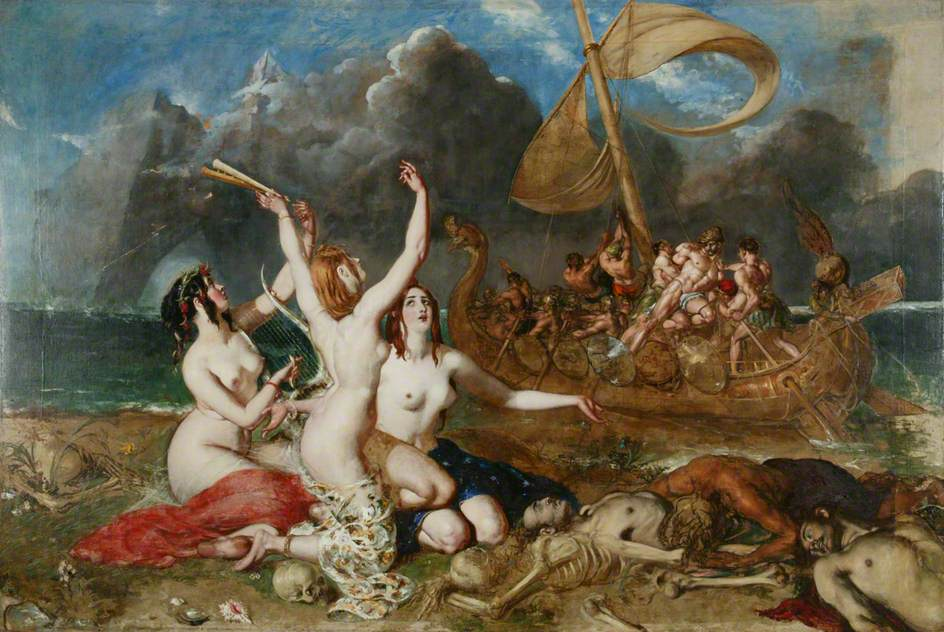
William Etty
The Sirens and Ulysses
1837

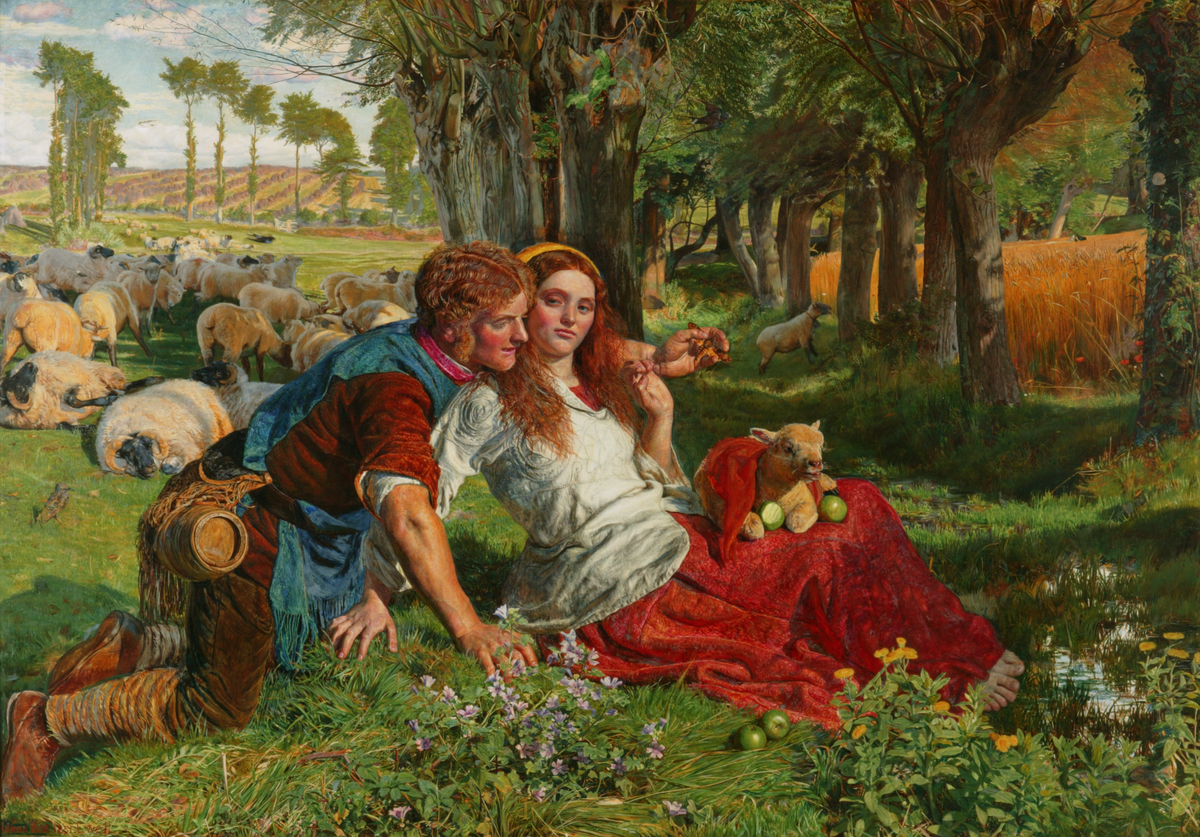
William Holman Hunt
The Hireling Shepherd
1851

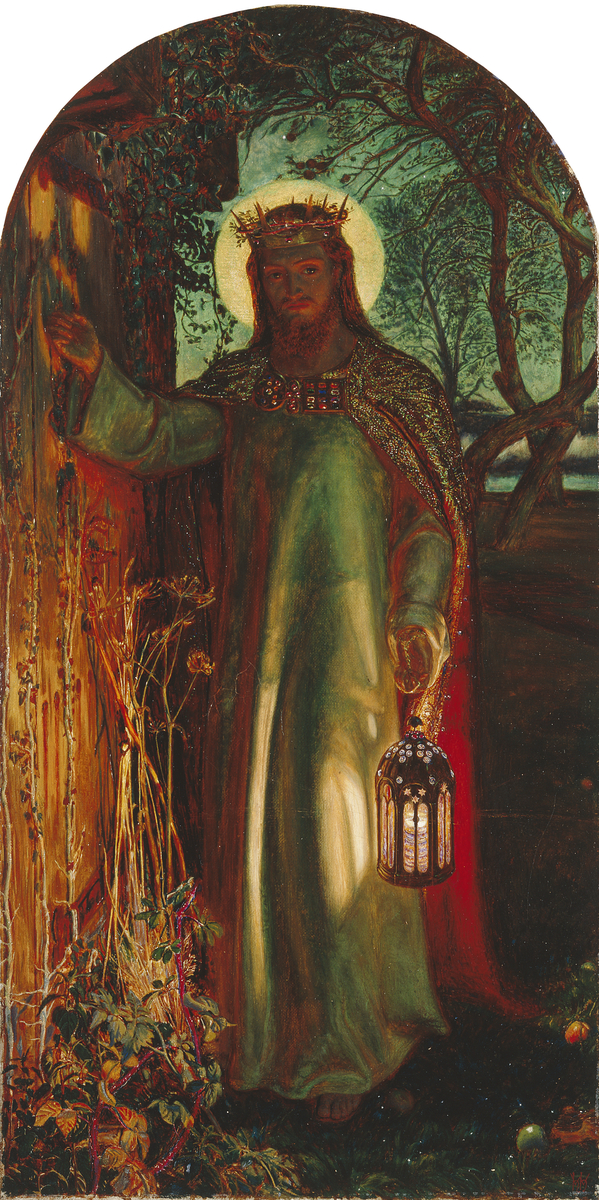
William Holman Hunt
The Light of the World
1851–1856

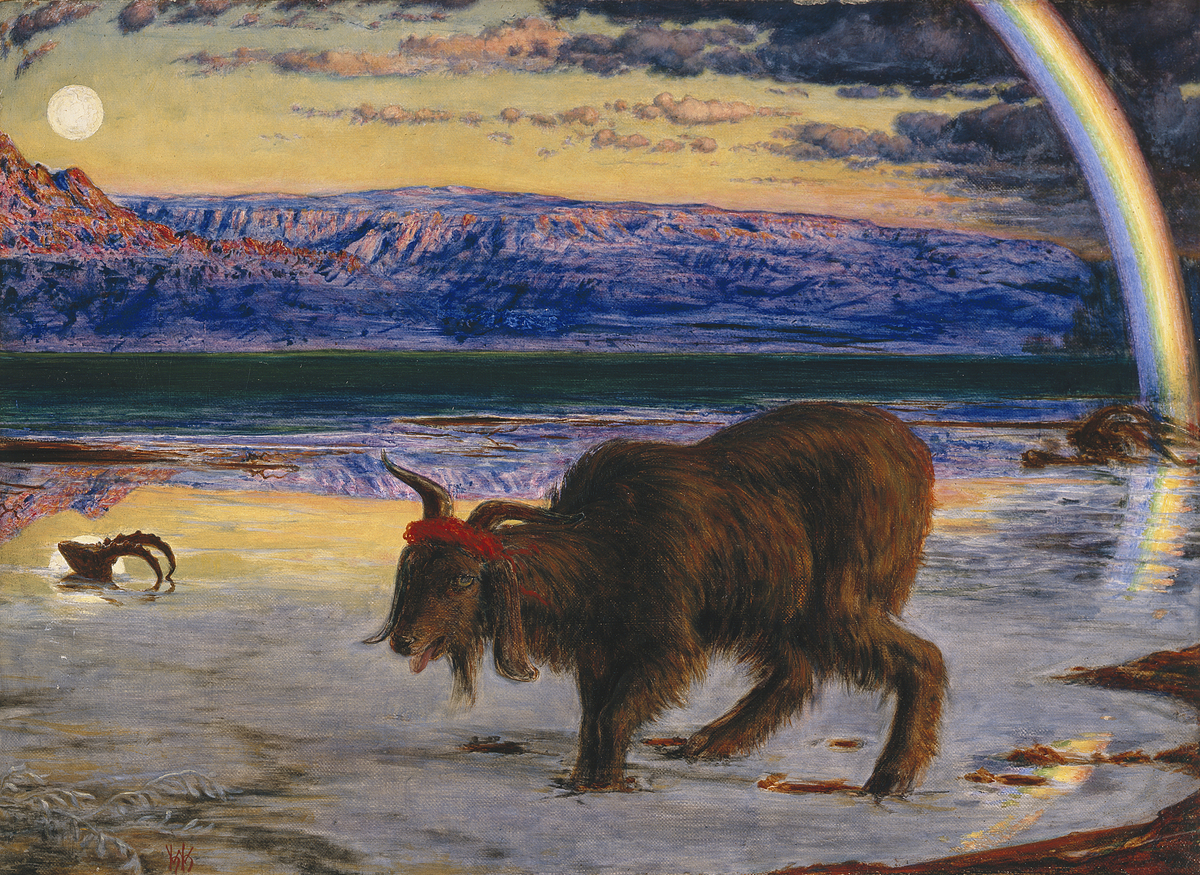
William Holman Hunt
The Scapegoat
1854–1855

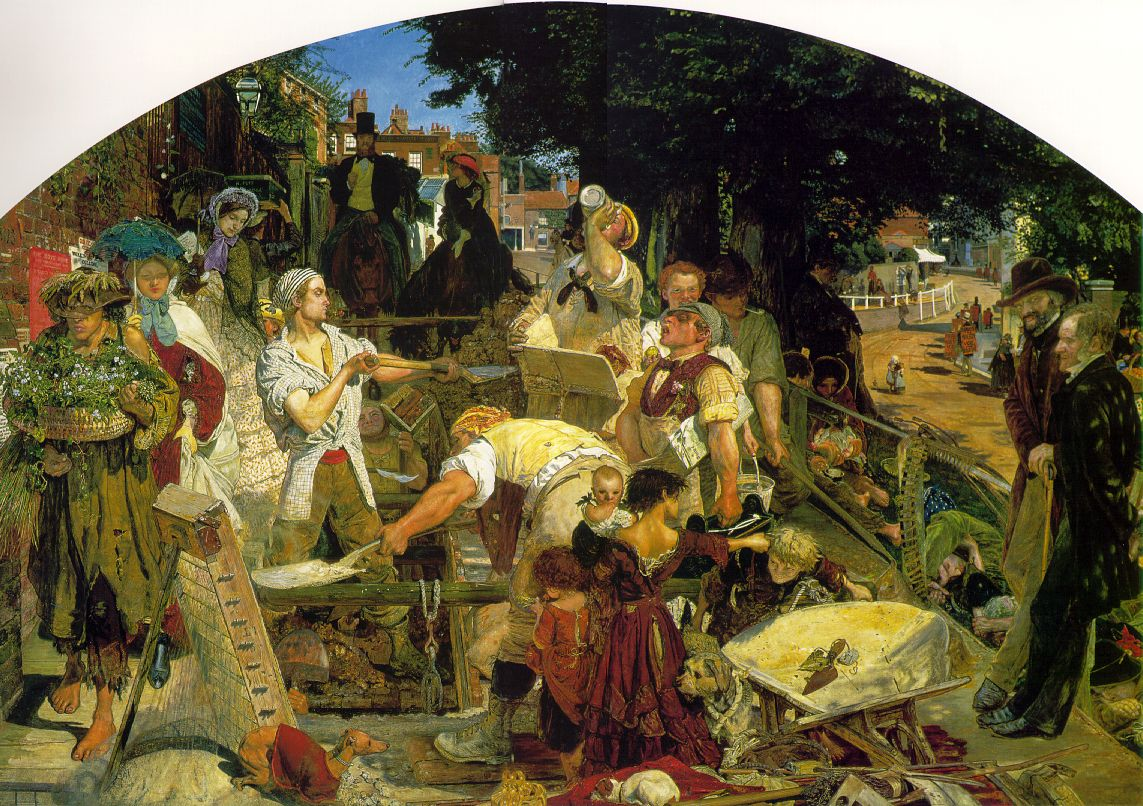
Ford Madox Brown
Work
1865

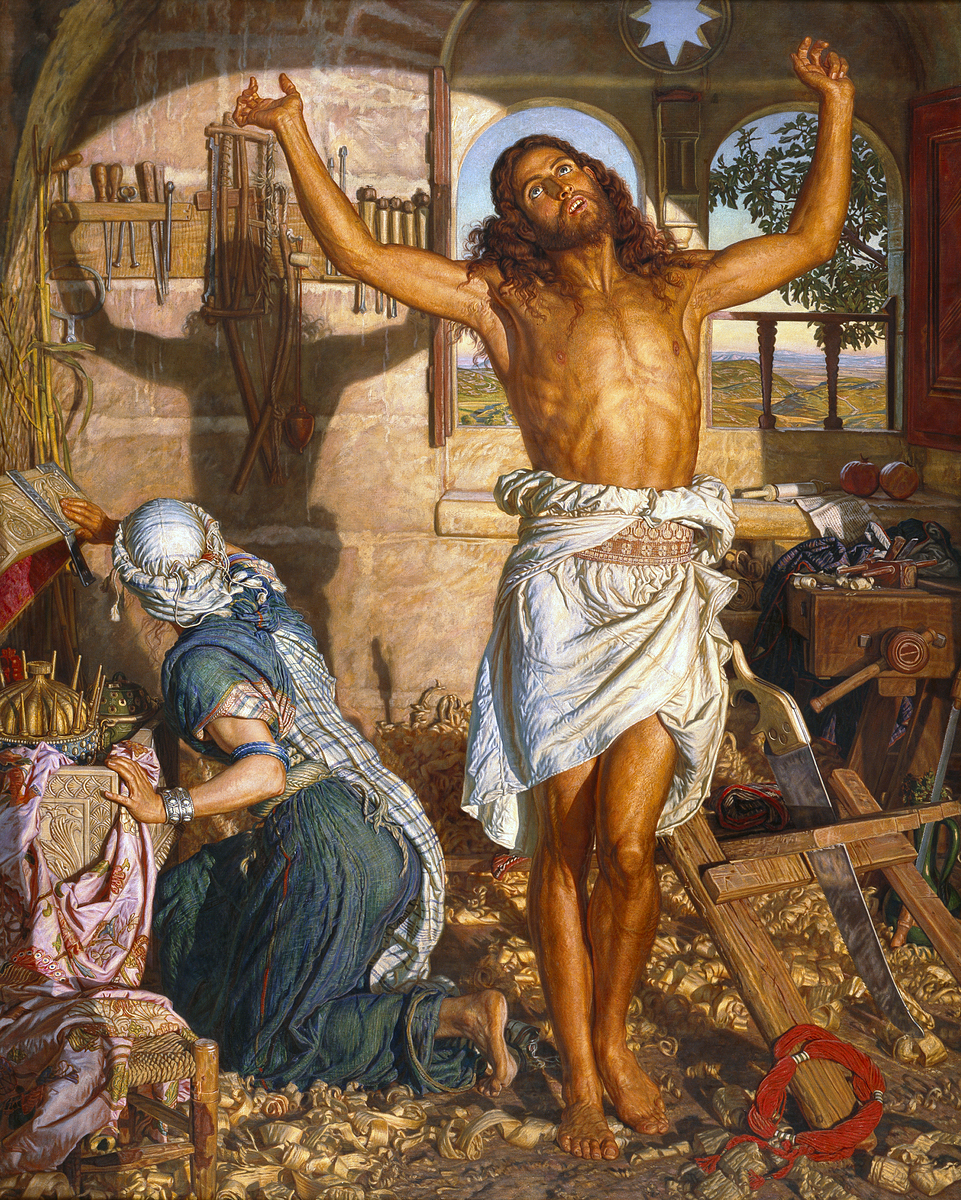
William Holman Hunt
The Shadow of Death
1870–1873

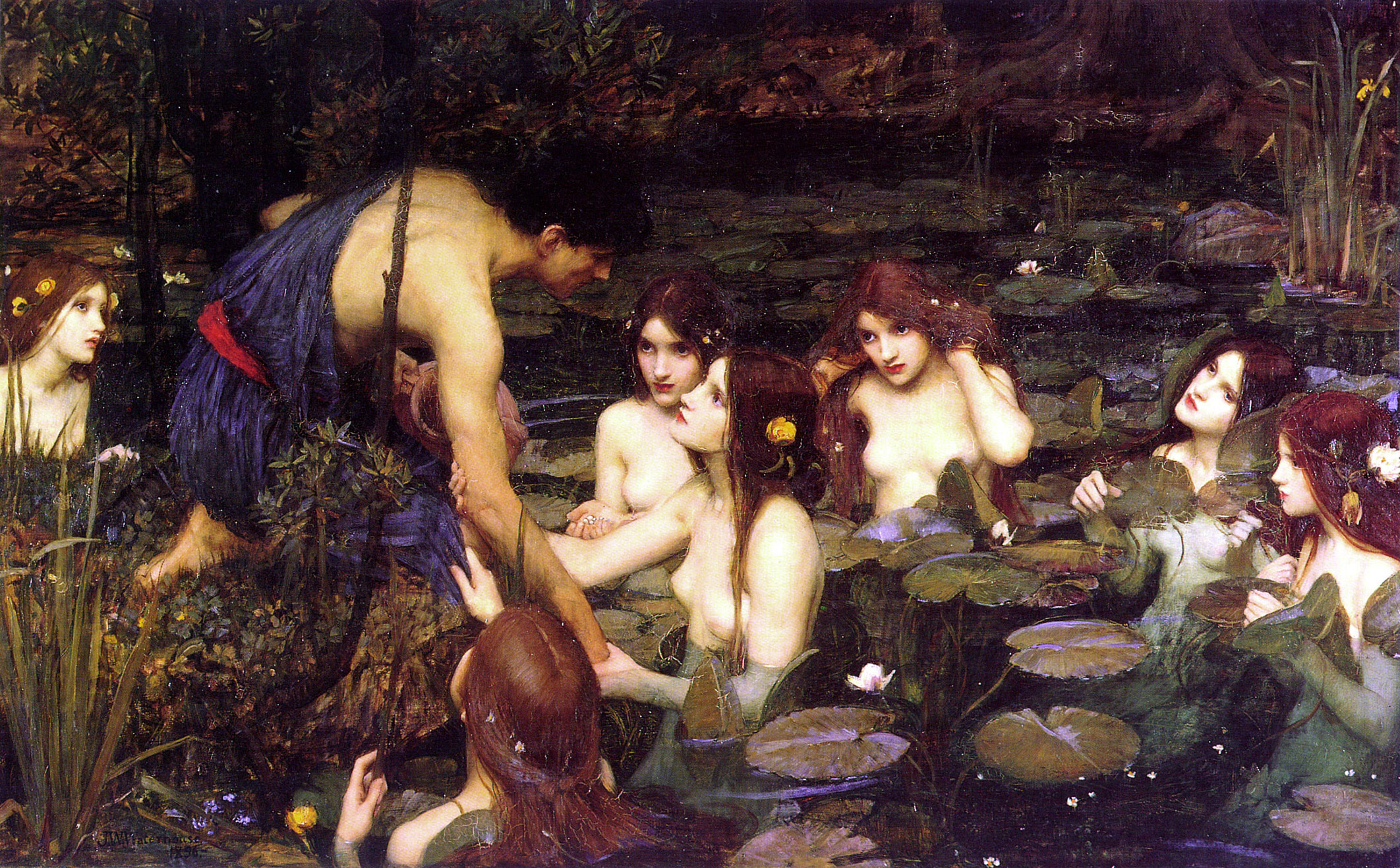
John William Waterhouse
Hylas and the Nymphs
1896

=== Artists ===
==== Dutch School ====
- Backhuysen, Ludolf – 1 painting;
- Borch, Gerard ter – 2 paintings;
- Brekelenkam, Quirijn van – 2 paintings;
- Jan van de Cappelle – 3 paintings;
- Cuyp, Aelbert – 2 paintings;
- Dou, Gerrit – 1 painting;
- Heem, Jan Janszoon de – 1 painting;
- Hobbema, Meyndert – 1 painting;
- Hooch, Pieter de – 2 paintings;
- Ochtervelt, Jacob – 2 paintings;
- Ostade, Adriaen van – 1 painting;
- Ruysdael, Salomon van – 2 paintings;
- Snyders, Frans – 1 painting;
- Sorgh, Hendrik Martenszoon – 2 paintings;
- Steen, Jan – 1 painting;
- Velde, Adriaen van de – 1 painting;
- Velde the Younger, Willem van de – 2 paintings;

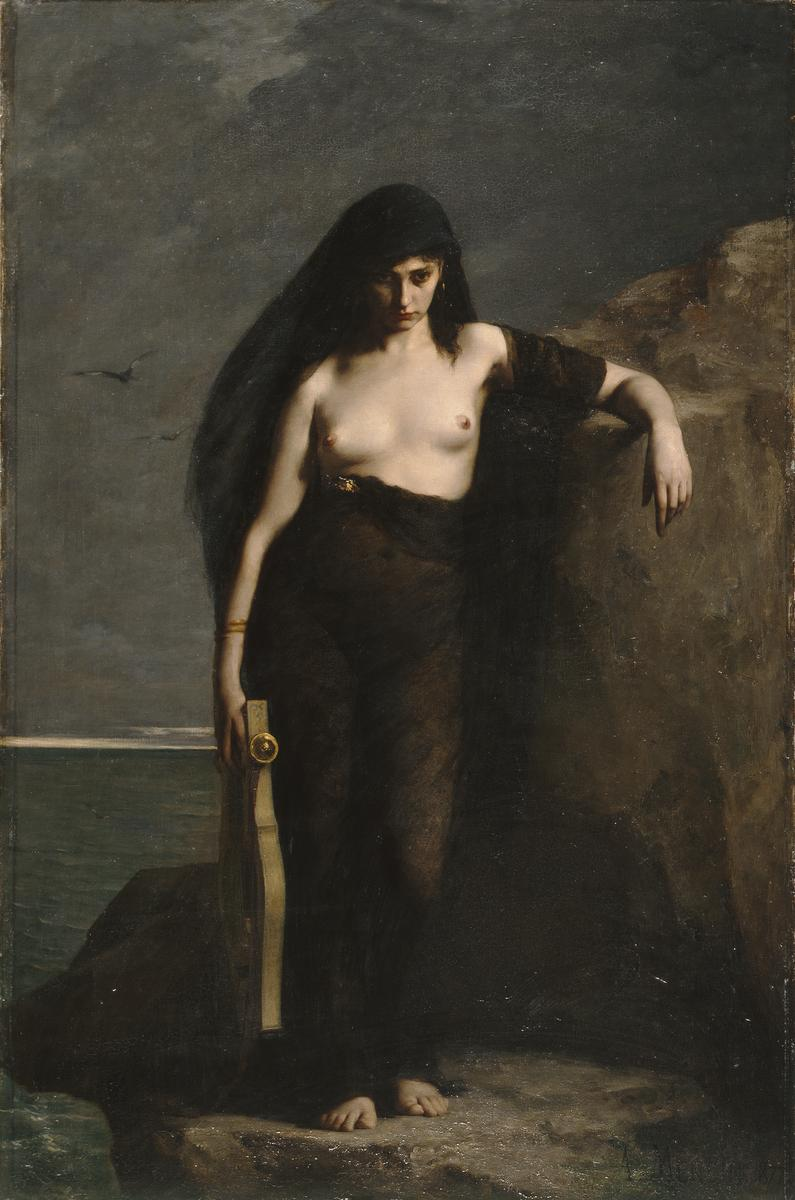
Charles Mengin (1877) Sappho

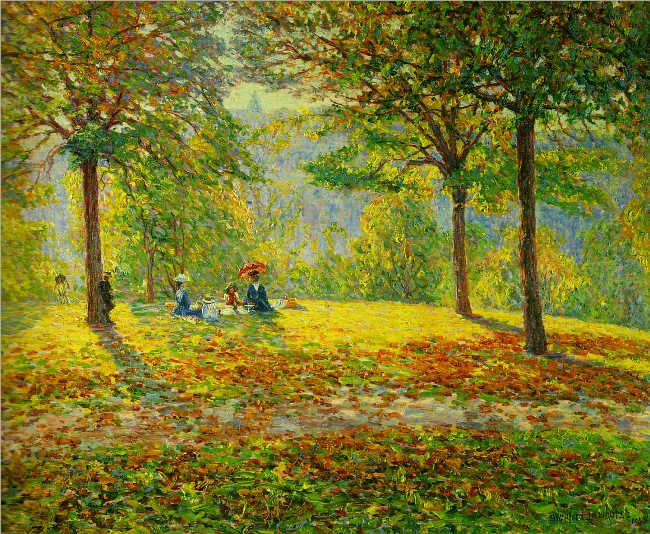
Wynford Dewhurst – The Picnic (1908)

==== English School ====
- Beechey, William – 2 paintings;
- Burra, Edward – 1 painting;
- Constable, John – 1 painting;
- Gainsborough, Thomas – 10 paintings;
- Hogarth, William – 2 paintings;
- Kneller, Sir Godfrey – 1 paintings;
- Landseer, Sir Edwin – 3 paintings;
- Lawrence, Thomas – 1 painting;
- Lely, Peter – 1 painting;
- Lowry, L. S. – 4 paintings;
- Nevinson, C. R. W. – 1 painting;
- Reynolds, Joshua – 4 paintings;
- Souch, John – 1 painting;
- Stubbs, George – 1 paintings;
- Turner, J. M. W. – 1 painting;
- Valette, Pierre Adolphe – 5 paintings;

==== Flemish School ====
- Francken the Younger, Frans – 1 painting;
- Teniers the Younger, David – 3 paintings;

==== French School ====
- Corot, Jean-Baptiste-Camille – 2 paintings;
- Degas, Edgar – 1 painting;
- Dughet, Gaspard – 1 painting;
- Gauguin, Eugène Henri Paul – 1 painting;
- Gellée, Claude – 1 painting;
- Mengin, Charles – 1 painting;
- Pissarro, Camille – 1 painting;
- Renoir, Pierre Auguste – 1 painting;
- Vernet, Claude-Joseph – 1 painting;

==== German School ====
- Zoffany, Johan – 1 painting;

==== Italian School ====
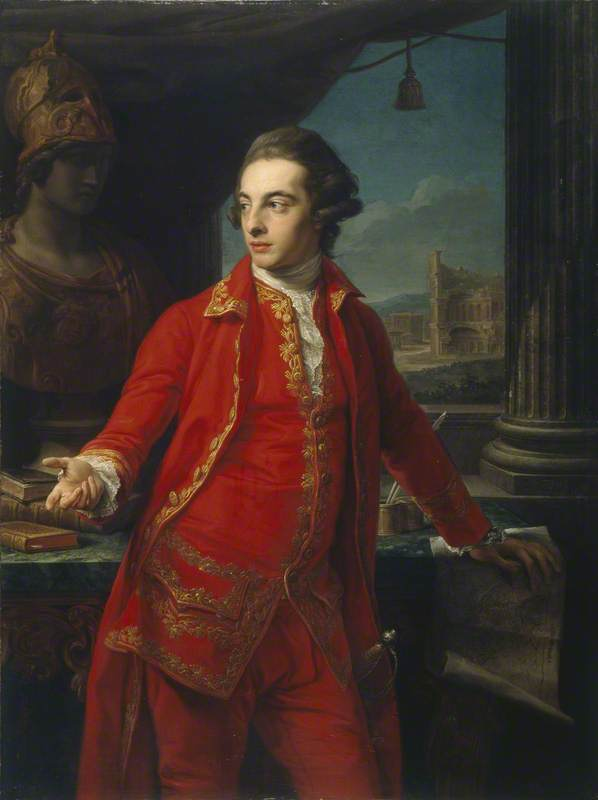
Portrait of Sir Gregory Page-Turner by Pompeo Batoni, 1768

- Batoni, Pompeo – 1 painting;
- Daddi, Bernardo – 1 painting;
- Giordano, Luca – 1 painting;
- Mura, Francesco de – 1 painting;
- Reni, Guido – 1 painting;
- Turchi, Alessandro – 1 painting;
- Zuccarelli, Francesco – 1 painting;
- Giovanni Ansaldo – 1 painting

==== Hungarian School ====
- Wagner, Alexander von – 1 painting

== Temporary exhibitions ==
2013: Raqib Shaw

2014: Joana Vasconcelos

2015: Matthew Darbyshire

2016: Boris Nzebo, Jai Redman

2017: Shirley Baker, Waqas Khan, Neha Choksi, Risham Syed, Hetain Patel, Mehreen Murtaza

2018: Sylvia Pankhurst, Annie Swynnerton, Kate Haywood, Sonia Boyce, Martin Parr

2019: Leonardo da Vinci, Halima Cassell, Louise Giovanelli

2021: Suzanne Lacy

== See also ==
- Grade I listed buildings in Greater Manchester
- Grade II* listed buildings in Greater Manchester
- Listed buildings in Manchester-M2
