= John Beswick =

John Beswick may refer to:

- John Beswick, father of Hannah Beswick (1688–1758), the Manchester Mummy
- John Beswick (politician) (born 1937), former Australian politician and Deputy Premier of Tasmania
- John Beswick (politician) (born 1937), former Australian politician and Deputy Premier of Tasmania
- John Beswick (cyclist) (born 1946), British cyclist

== See also ==
- John Beswicke (1847–1925), Australian architect
