= Thomas Horsfall =

Thomas Horsfall may refer to:

- Thomas Horsfall (politician) (1805–1878), Liverpool-based British politician
- Thomas Coglan Horsfall (1841–1932), Manchester-based philanthropist
- Tommy Horsfall (born 1951), Scottish footballer
