= Wynford Dewhurst =

English painter

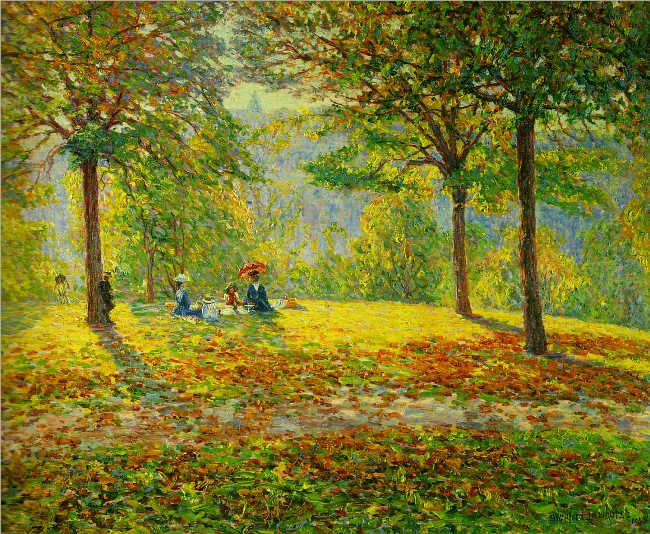
The Picnic (1908; Manchester Art Gallery)

Wynford Dewhurst RBA (26 January 1864 – 9 July 1941) was an English Impressionist painter and notable art theorist. He spent considerable time in France and his work was profoundly influenced by Claude Monet.

== Biography ==
Wynford Dewhurst was born Thomas Edward Smith to an affluent family in Manchester in 1864. He was educated at home by a private tutor and later at Mintholme College. Although he originally trained to enter the legal profession, he showed artistic flair and decided to pursue a career as a painter after some of his drawings were published in various journals.

He gained artistic training in France at the École des Beaux-Arts in Paris (at which time he changed his name to Wynford Dewhurst by deed poll), where he was a pupil of the renowned French painter Jean-Léon Gérôme. Despite his teacher Gérome's rejection of the radical Impressionist movement in favour of a highly finished academic style (Gérome continued the development and conservation of French Neoclassicism), Dewhurst was heavily influenced by the Impressionists. It is well known that he first encountered Impressionism, to which he was instantly attracted, in the work of Emile Claus in the Maddocks Collection in Bradford. However his most important mentor would become Claude Monet.

It was Monet to whom Dewhurst dedicated his pioneering account of French Impressionism, Impressionist Painting: its genesis and development, in 1904. This was the first important study of the French painters to be published in English. As well as helping to reintroduce British artists to this style of painting, Dewhurst's book called attention to the French Impressionists' debt to the British artists John Constable and J. M. W. Turner, claiming that the Impressionists simply developed their existing painterly techniques."(By the turn of the century) British painters, if not the British public, had reconciled themselves to impressionism."

According to Dewhurst, artists who, like himself, painted in an impressionist manner, were often "sneered at for imitating a foreign style", and he was keen to justify their position. "French artists simply developed a style which was British in its conception", he wrote, a view that was dismissed by French painters such as Pissarro, who revealed his national bias when he acknowledged Constable and Turner but identified instead French influences like Nicolas Poussin, Claude Lorrain, Jean-Baptiste-Siméon Chardin and Jean-Baptiste-Camille Corot. However, Pissarro had earlier told an interviewer: "It seems to me that we are all descended from the Englishman Turner. He was the first who could make colors blaze with a natural brilliance." The thesis that Dewhurst put forward in Impressionist Painting was controversial, for it dealt with the debated question of whether Impressionism was French or British in origin. However, it found much support in Britain: Kevin McConkey informs us that Dewhurst's theme "was taken up by others as various as Clausen, John Rothenstein and Kenneth Clark" Nevertheless, Dewhurst's "detailed biographical notices of the most prominent artists associated with the rise of impressionism in France ... leave little to be desired from the historical point of view". It is worth noting that Impressionist Painting also included an entire chapter on female artists, since "modernity is the note of Impressionism, and that movement was the very first artistic revolt in which women took part". Indeed, Dewhurst thanks the celebrated female painter Mary Cassatt (who worked within the Impressionist circle) for her assistance in the preface of his book.

During his career Dewhurst became known for his paintings of the countryside around Dieppe and the Seine valley, where he painted regularly, and he confessed that it was here that his most significant artistic revelations occurred. For example, he discovered the violet light found in Monet's mid-day canvases:

I remember distinctly, during the summer of 1901, at Les Andelys-on-Seine, that upon two days and for two hours in the afternoons of those days all Nature, animate and inanimate, bore the aspect of things seen under a strong glare of violet light, exactly as though a tinted glass were suspended between the sun's rays and the earth. The effect was most curious and disturbing. Nature appears to be toneless and flat. Highlights and shadows are attenuated almost to extinction, whilst in this dull purple glare the heat became more intense than ever, possibly through lack of wind, for all was still.

Throughout his life Dewhurst exhibited frequently at the Royal Society of British Artists, the New English Art Club from 1909 to 1910 and at the Royal Academy (where he also lectured on art) from 1914 to 1926. He held two one-man shows in London; the first was at the Walker Galleries in 1923, and in 1926 he held a significant exhibition of his pastels at the Fine Art Society. He also exhibited several times in Paris and Venice, in Buenos Aires in 1910, in Rome in 1911, and held a series of solo exhibitions in Germany. Examples of his work can be found in public collections: Three paintings, including Summer Mist, Valley of La Creuse (c. 1920), are in the collection of the National Museum of Wales, Cardiff. The Picnic (1908), a celebrated picture which exemplifies the influence of Monet in its use of small dabs of colour, resulting in an optical blend of hues when seen from a distance, is in the collection of Manchester City Art Gallery.

== Later years ==
Dewhurst's mature work demonstrates a more expressive handling. This is especially evident in a series of paintings he produced in the valley of La Creuse, where the bright, almost garish palette again recalls Monet, although in some instances they achieve "an unintended Fauvist intensity."

Dewhurst died on 9 July 1941 in Burton upon Trent.

== Personal life ==
Dewhurst had married Antonia von Bülow, of a German aristocratic family; they had six children, including Royal Marine Colonel Frederick Wynford Dewhurst, who married Patricia, dau. of Sir Thomas Richard Pennefather Warren, 8th Baronet.

== Legacy ==
In 1995, Dewhurst was included in an important exhibition called 'Impressionism in Britain' at the Barbican Art Gallery, London, which demonstrated that the proliferation of Impressionism was not, contrary to popular belief, exclusive to France, but flourished in Britain as well where Dewhurst played an important role.

The first major retrospective of Dewhurst, Wynford Dewhurst: Manchester’s Monet, was organised by Manchester Art Gallery from 9 December 2016 to 23 April 2017.

== Gallery ==
French Landscape, 1895
National Museum Cardiff

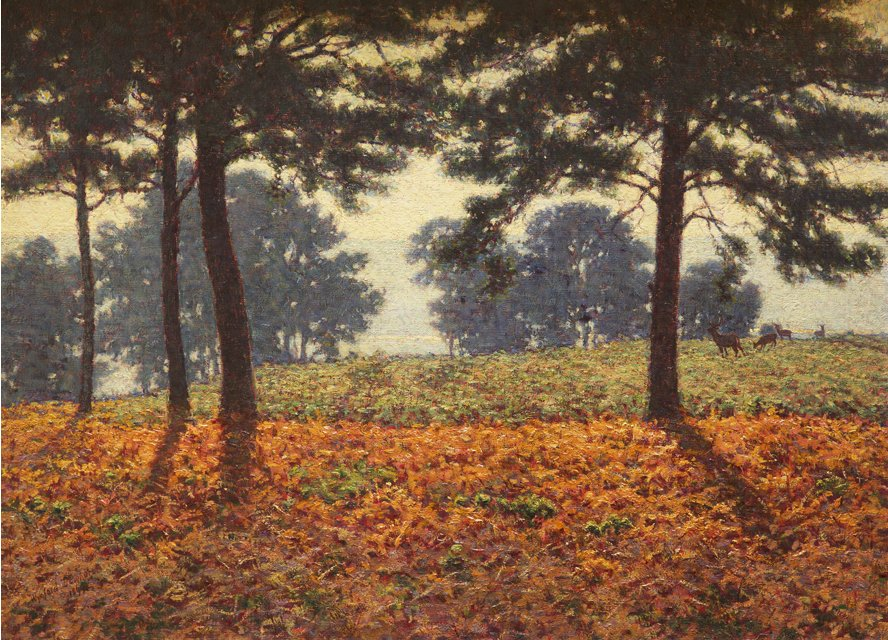
Evening Shadows, 1899
Private collection

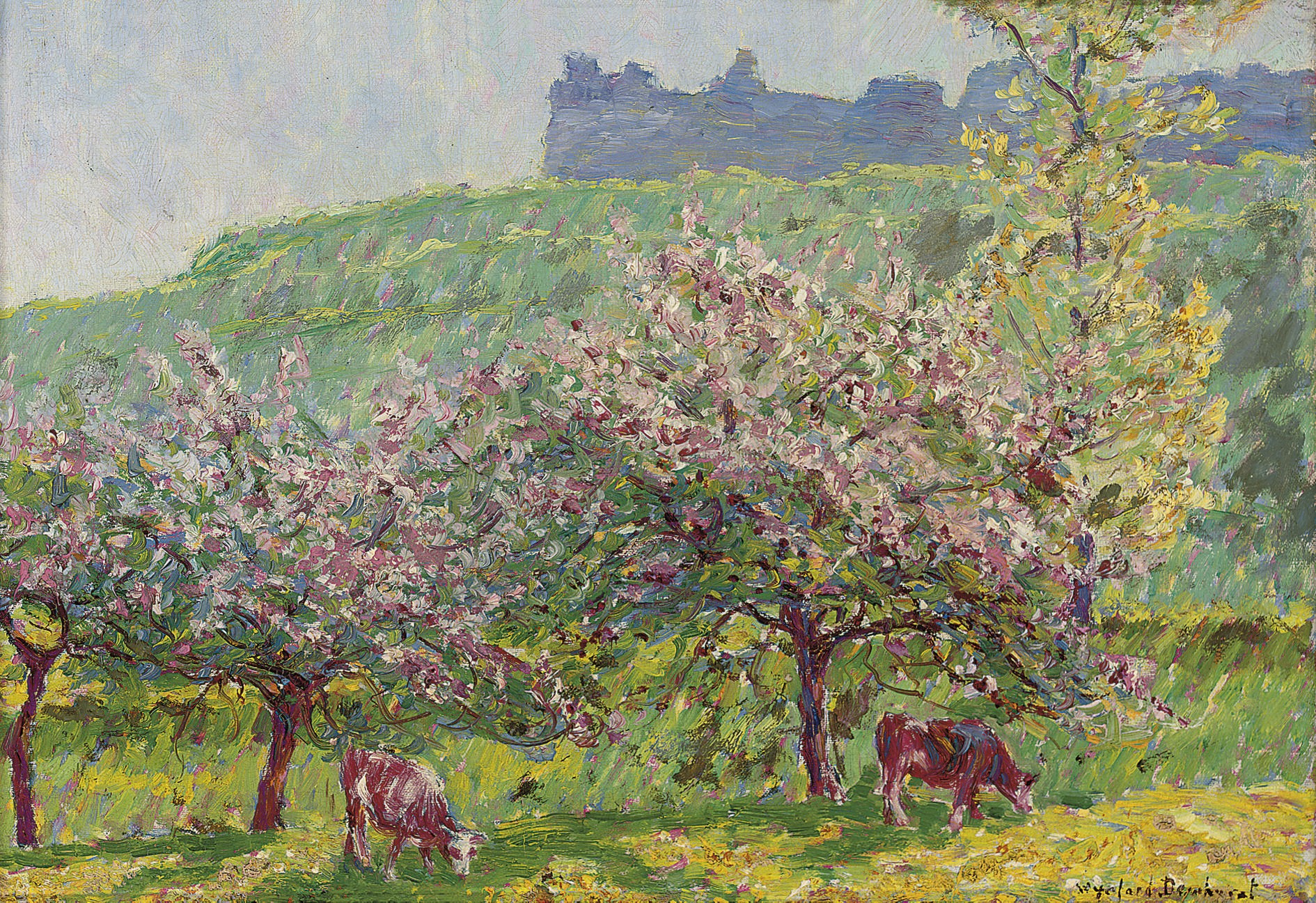
Apple-Blossom time in Arc-la-Bataille
Private collection

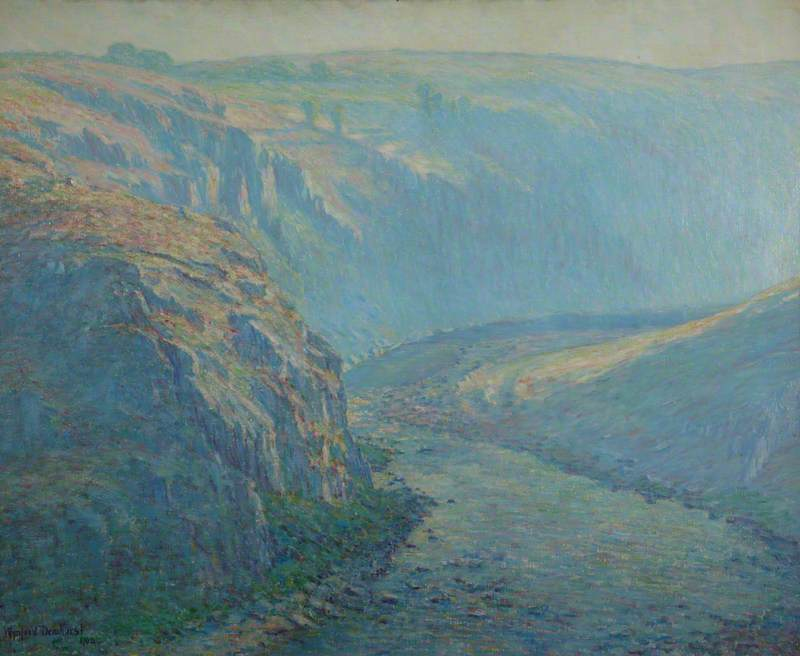
The Blue Valley, 1908
Manchester Art Gallery

== Writings by Dewhurst ==
=== Books ===
- Impressionist Painting: its genesis and development. London: George Newnes, 1904.
- Wanted: a ministry of fine arts. London: Hugh Rees Ltd, 1913. (Reprinted in The Art Chronicle.)

=== Articles ===
- 'Claude Monet, Impressionist' in The Pall Mall Magazine, June 1900.
- 'A Great French Landscapist' in The Artist, October 1900.
- 'Impressionist Painting: its genesis and development', part 1, in The Studio. vol. XXXIX, April 1903.
- 'Impressionist Painting: its genesis and development', part 2, in The Studio. vol. XXXIX, July 1903.
- 'What is Impressionism?' in The Contemporary Review. vol. XCIX, 1911.

== Bibliography ==
- Brown, Roger, "Wynford Dewhurst - Manchester's Monet", Bristol: Sansom & Company, 2016
- Farr, Dennis, English Art, 1870–1940. Oxford: Oxford University Press, 1978.
- Flint, Kate, Impressionists in England: the critical reception. London: Routledge, 1984.
- McConkey, Kenneth, Impressionism in Britain, exh. cat., with an essay by Anna Gruetzner Robins. New Haven: Yale University Press in association with Barbican Art Gallery, 1995.
- McConkey, Kenneth, British Impressionism. Oxford: Phaidon, 1989.
- Speiss, Dominique, Encyclopedia of Impressionists: From the Precursors to the Heirs. Helsinki: Edita, 1992.
