= Charles Mengin =

French painter

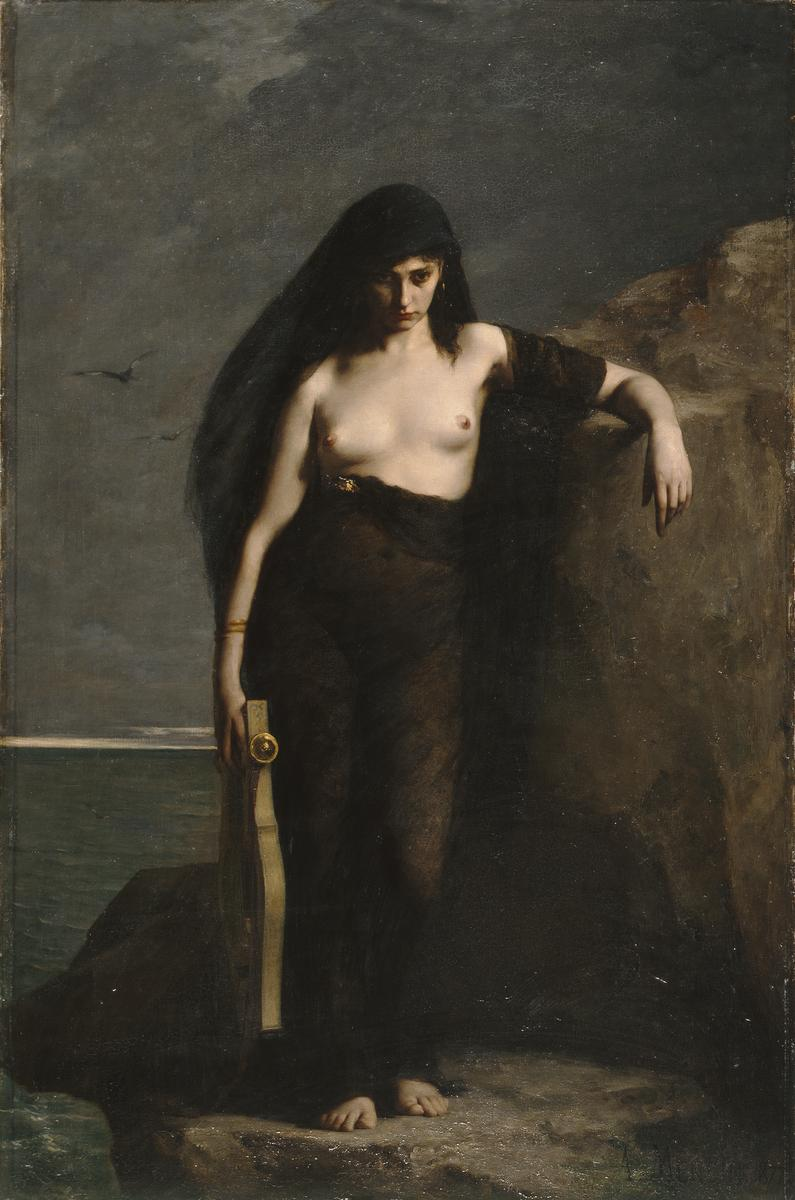
Sappho, by Charles Mengin (1877) Manchester Art Gallery, England

Charles Auguste Mengin (5 July 1853 – 3 April 1933), was a French academic painter and sculptor.

He is known for his painting of the Greek poet Sappho, made in 1877, now in the collection of the Manchester Art Gallery, in England.

== Early life and education ==
Mengin was born on 5 July 1853 in Paris to Auguste Charles Victor Mengin, a sculptor who died in 1894 in the 14th arrondissement of Paris. He was educated in both painting and sculpture by Gecker, Alexandre Cabanel, Paul Baudry, and sculptor Aimé Millet, at the École des Beaux-Arts in Paris.

== Career ==
Mengin mainly painted mythical scenes and portraits. He owes his place in art history mainly to his painting Sappho (1877), which can be seen in the Manchester Art Gallery. Sappho is one of the paintings presented by Umberto Eco in his book The History of Beauty as exemplary of 'romantic beauty'.

== Exhibitions ==
He first exhibited in 1876 at the Paris Salon together with his twin brother, Paul Eugène Mengin (1853-1937). He continued his exhibitions at salons of the Société des Artistes Français until 1927. He won a gold medal at the 1900 World's Fair.

== Death ==
Mengin died in Paris in 1933.

== Gallery ==
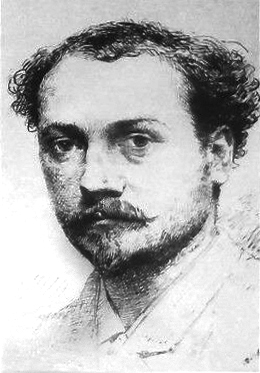
Portrait of Émile Peynot, 1886

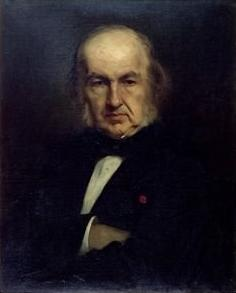
Portrait of Claude Bernard (1813–1878)

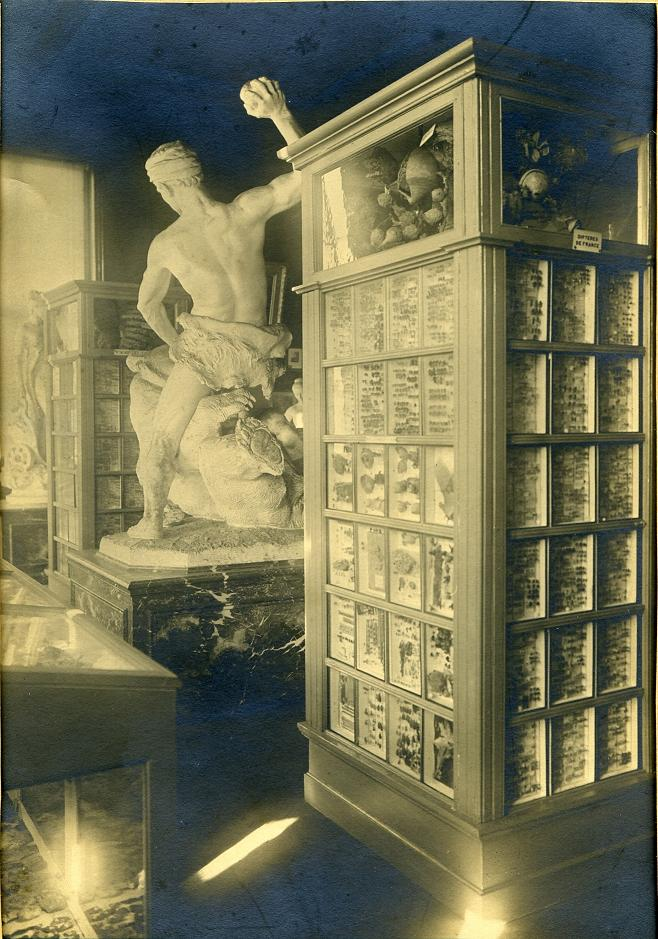
The Exploits of David (missing work). fr: Musée d'Elbeuf, around 1900
