= Manchester Art Museum =

Art museum in Manchester from 1877 to 1953

Coordinates: 53°28′40.9″N 2°13′01.3″W

The Manchester Art Museum, also known as the Horsfall Museum or Ancoats Museum, was an art museum in Manchester, England, from 1877 until 1953. It was begun as an educational venture in 1877 by Thomas Coglan Horsfall, who had been inspired by John Ruskin to provide education and inspiration to the working classes. In 1886 the museum was moved to Ancoats Hall. The collection included a wide range of items including paintings, engravings, photographs, reproductions, antiquities, ceramics, glass, metalwork, natural history specimens, and images of Manchester.

In keeping with Horsfall's moral views, no nudes were displayed at the gallery. A room in the gallery was furnished by William Morris as an example of aesthetic design. According to the historian Shelagh Wilson, the gallery was popular as a respectable alternative attraction to pubs and music halls, but by the early 20th century it was unable to compete with new forms of popular entertainment. When a cinema opened nearby, attendance dropped dramatically.

In 1918 the museum was taken over by Manchester City Council. It closed in 1953 and its contents were absorbed into the collection of Manchester City Art Gallery.
