= Ancoats railway station =

Former railway station in Manchester, England

Coordinates: 53.478073°N 2.221761°W

Ancoats Station was a goods station operated by the Midland Railway to handle freight traffic in Manchester, England, on land bought in the Ancoats district from the Mosley family, whose adjacent family seat Ancoats Hall was also taken over by the railway company for business use.

== History ==
The Midland Railway's presence in Manchester dated from 1861 and had relied initially on an alliance with the Manchester, Sheffield & Lincolnshire Railway, whose London Road station facilities they used. The city's railway infrastructure was struggling to cope with the volume of traffic but Manchester Corporation at first opposed the plans for a new station in Ancoats, which was a densely populated and industrialised area of the emerging city. The Midland Railway obtained permission to build a goods station on a 70-acre (28 ha) site there in 1865 after offering the Corporation £5000 in compensation for the 10,000 square yards (8,400 m^{2}) of streets that would be subsumed by the development.

The site was in an area bounded by Adair Street, Great Ancoats Street, Helmet Street and St Andrew's Square. Construction of the station began around 1868 and it opened on 2 May 1870. It was linked to the existing rail network by a track running from Ashburys railway station that crossed a viaduct on Great Ancoats Street. The station had three entrances, being from Great Ancoats Street, Watson Street and near to St Andrew's Church. There were both cellars and above-track rooms for storage as well as large sheds and yards at ground level and at least three platforms. Goods were moved across the tracks using traversers rather than turntables, and wagons could be moved along the tracks with hydraulic capstans rather than horses. Eight two-ton cranes and 36 one-ton variants were available, of which 20 were capable of being used in manual mode as well as hydraulically. The hydraulic power was generated with a 40-horsepower engine and operated at 700 pounds per square inch. Various weighing-machines were present, including some that could handle carts of up to 20 tons. There was space available on the site for further development in the future. Together with the associated connecting lines, bridgeworks and other necessary engineering, the construction cost £486,000. Upon opening, the Midland ceased its goods traffic operations at Ardwick.

The facilities included a bonded warehouse. A rifle range for employees was opened in 1909, mirroring similar ranges that existed at other Midland Railway stations.

The facilities were remodelled around 1937 to increase substantially the number of wagon movements, which at that time amounted to 200 wagons in and out daily. By that time, the station was operated by the London, Midland and Scottish Railway, into which the Midland Railway had merged.

The station closed on 17 July 1972. Its site is now occupied by the Piccadilly Trading Estate.
