= Sappho (painting) =

Painting by Charles Mengin

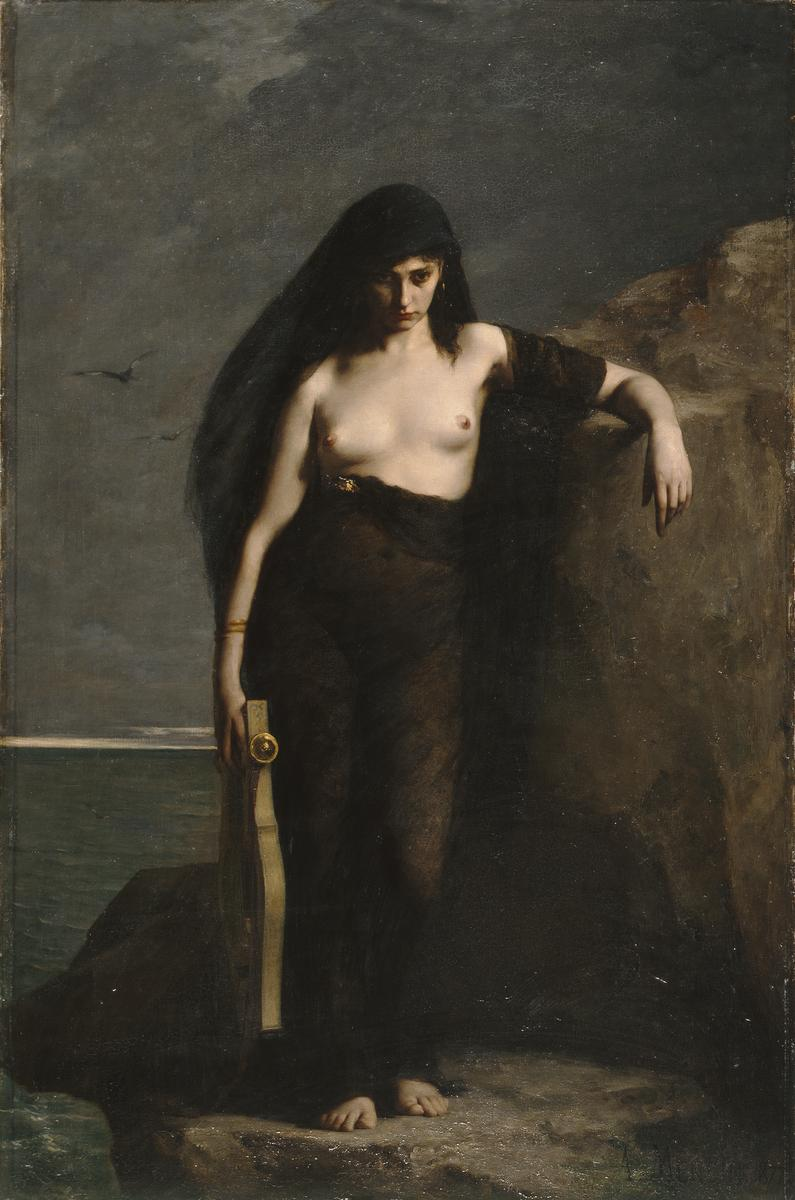
- Artist: Charles Mengin
- Year: 1877
- Type: Oil on canvas, history painting
- Dimensions: 230.7 cm × 151.1 cm (90.8 in × 59.5 in)
- Location: Manchester Art Gallery, Greater Manchester

Sappho is an 1877 oil painting by the French artist Charles Mengin. The painting shows the Ancient Greek poetess Sappho, celebrated for her largely now-lost writings. The picture was based on a legendary scene – having been rejected by the boatman Phaon, Sappho goes to throw herself off a cliff at Leucadia. She is shown filled with grief on the clifftop.

Sappho was a popular subject throughout the nineteenth century based as much as the legend that built around her as the fragments of poetry that have survived. The scene had depicted has notably featured in the Romantic poet Thomas Moore's Evenings in Greece from 1826. Mengin displayed the picture at the Salon of 1877 in Paris. The painting is now part of the collection of Manchester Art Gallery, having been acquired in 1884.

== Bibliography ==
- Budelman, Felix (ed.) The Cambridge Companion to Greek Lyric. Cambridge University Press, 2009.
- Howard, Michael. Up Close: A Guide to Manchester Art Gallery. Scala, 2002.
- Martindale, Charles & Thomas, Richard F. Classics and the Uses of Reception. John Wiley & Sons, 2008.
