= Charles White (physician) =

British physician (1728-1813)

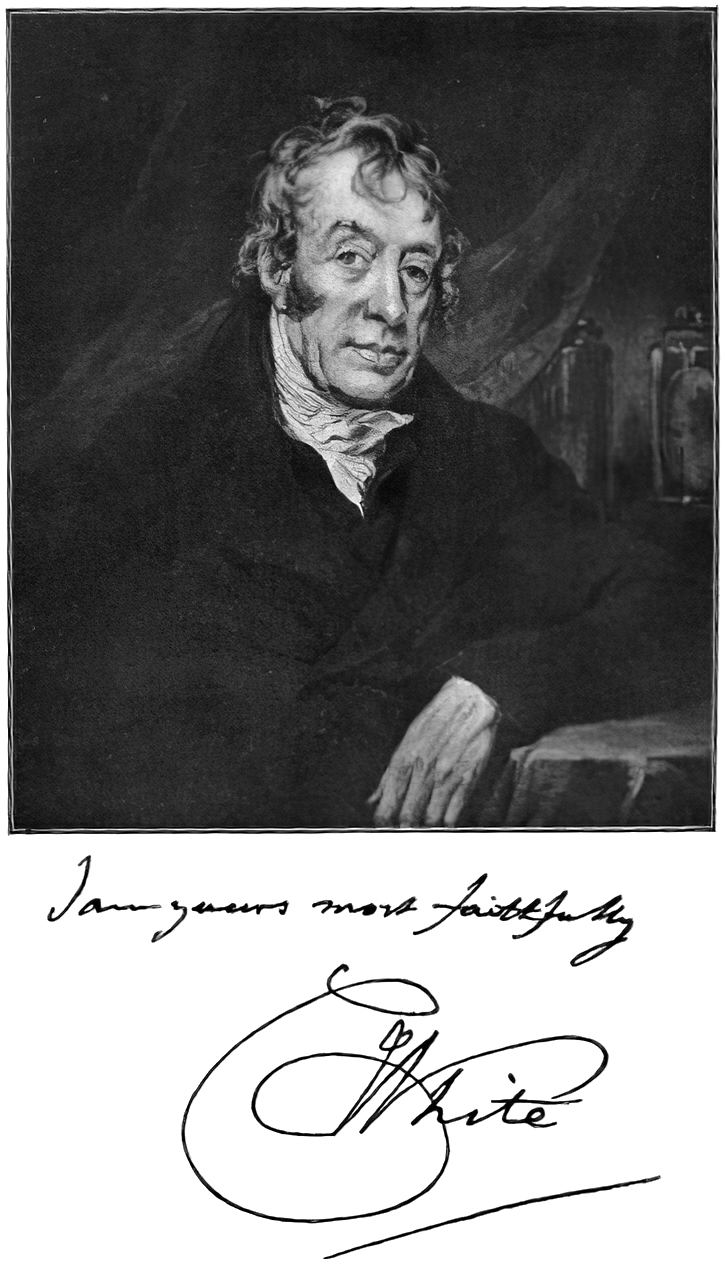
Charles White

Charles White FRS (4 October 1728 – 20 February 1813) was an English physician and a co-founder of the Manchester Royal Infirmary and the St Mary's Hospital for Lying in Women in 1790. White made contributions in the fields of orthopaedics, surgery, and obstetrics. He was a founding member of the Portico Library and of the Manchester Literary and Philosophical Society, where he was also Vice President for twenty three years.

== Early life ==
White was born in Manchester, England, on 4 October 1728, the only son of Thomas White, a surgeon and midwife, and Rosamond Bower. After being educated by the Reverend Radcliffe Russell, White joined his father's practice as an apprentice in about 1742. He was able to assist in surgery and deliveries from the young age of 14. He subsequently studied medicine in London under the anatomist and obstetrician William Hunter in 1748. After finishing his training with Dr. Hunter he went to Edinburgh to further his studies before returning to Manchester in 1751. He joined his father in practice at their home in King street. After his father's death he continued his practice there until he retired to his father's country house at Sale Priory.

== Career ==
=== General surgical techniques ===
- From the 1750s onward, White became increasingly recognised as an able and innovative surgeon. He presented a paper to the Royal Society in 1760 describing his successful treatment of a fractured arm by reuniting the ends of the broken bone. In 1762, the year he became a fellow of the society, he presented another paper, on the use of sponges to stop bleeding. Most people were using a ligature which was extremely painful. White asserted the sponge was less painful and more effective than a ligature in lacerated areas and when there was much contusion. In his report to the Royal Society, he recorded thirteen cases that were entirely successful where all other methods had failed. He also used dry sponges to foul abscesses and ulcers with successful results. He became a member of the Company of Surgeons that same year.
- He devised a method for reducing dislocations of the shoulder. He reported that in twenty years he had yet to fail to reduce the joint. The method entailed the use of an iron ring in the ceiling and a pulley fixed into it, the other end fastened by bandages to the forearm above the wrist. By drawing up the patient, supported by staff, he could then relocate the humerus.
- In 1770 he donated to his friend, John Hunter, an interesting specimen from a woman who had recently died in a lunatic asylum. She had had an operation for an arteriovenous aneurysm following an injury to the brachial artery during venesection some fourteen years earlier. The specimen showed three inches of the artery obliterated as a result of ligation and below the aneurysm but that a perfect collateral circulation had developed.
- In 1768 a boy of 14 who presented with an infected osteomyelitis of the humeral head. The abscess was drained. The treatment would have routinely been an amputation of the arm. White exposed the humeral head and excised it, sawing off two inches of bone. The patient recovered and had full use of his arm and movement at the shoulder. Although he was not as has been claimed the first to excise the humeral head for disease, nonetheless White was the pioneer in the operation of partial diaphysectomy for acute osteomyelitis.
- He was one of the most eminent of lithotomists of his day.
- In his later career, White, with his son Thomas, delivered possibly the first ever series of anatomy lectures in the provinces at the Manchester Literary and Philosophical Society in 1783. They also started instructional anatomy lectures from his house in King Street from 1787.

=== Obstetrics, Childbirth and the Puerperium ===
White will be forever remembered in Manchester as the founder of the hospital and a formidable surgeon, and often acclaimed as the "father of conservative surgery". During much of this time he was in charge of Midwifery for the Poor of Manchester and surrounding districts. His major work a Treatise on the Management of Pregnant and Lying-in Women, was published in 1773 and went through some five editions. It was published in the United Kingdom and United States and then translated and printed in Germany and France. In it he suggested significant changes in the care of women in pregnancy, during childbirth and in the puerperium. In it he describes the prevailing practice in which the room for a woman to deliver in was often crowded. A fire was lit, the windows were all shut, the curtains stitched. The woman was encouraged to lie flat and be completely covered by blankets. After delivery, she was confined in a horizontal position for days so that the lochia tended to remain in the vagina stagnating and festering. He would ensure the room was cooled, and the windows to be opened. He insisted on hygienic conditions, regular hand washing, changes of bed linen, towels and sponges and instruments. Although unaware specifically of bacteria he urged not only scrupulous cleaning but also separate bed chambers for women in labour. If any woman developed fever she should be isolated for a week or ten days to prevent spread of the fever. In such a case, after the woman had left the hospital, the room should be scrubbed including the woodwork, the curtains and floor.

He also encouraged rapid mobilisation of women after delivery in the first or second days. The normal was for them to be bed bound for days. This again was farsighted and although we would agree today even a hundred years later his advocates could not quite believe this.

Puerpural Fever was a common cause of illness and mortality in women. White's practices practically eliminated this terror. He was sure that free flow of noxious fluids by gravitational drainage. For this he designed a chair to encourage such flow. Such an innovation is also often called a Fowler Chair after the American Surgeon who designed something similar a hundred years later for treatment of Peritonitis. Again White is credited in being the originator by Curtis. White was so successful in this that he practically eliminated Puerpural Fever from his wards. In 1789 in Vienna they appointed Professor Boer who had studied White's methods at the Lying in Hospital there. He had learned White's methods whilst in England and used them in Vienna. During his time there 65,000 women passed through the Vienna Lying In Hospital with a death rate of 1.3%. He was deposed by Professor Klein who discarded White's methods and also at the same time he brought in the practice of teaching on the cadaver to his juniors. His mortality rate increased to 7.8% in the first year and as high as 29% one year. It was into this situation that Semmelweis came and slowly brought forward his insights into the causes and prevention of Puerpural Fever. He stopped the students attending cadavers in 1846 but it took him until 1861 to emphasise the importance of foul bed clothes, general cleanliness and the washing of hands of midwives etc. In almost all areas White's writings advise the same precautions as Semmelweis 75 years later. The only omission was in avoiding cadavers which was not a factor in Manchester. White was first to pronounce on good care to avoid infection. His work saved thousands of lives.

He was also ahead of his time in the decisions about delivery and clamping of the cord. The habit was to hurry the delivery of shoulders after the head had delivered to prevent retention of the placenta. White was certain that it was better to allow a pause and restitution of the baby's body before the woman pushed to deliver the shoulders. He stated that nature knew best and insisted that it was safer to wait. Again he has been proven right.

Even more impressively is his advice that in delivery the desire to cut the cord early should be resisted. Dr. White insisted in waiting until the cord had stopped pulsating. Even in our time there have been advocates of early clamping but it would appear that he was right as made clear by Dr. Peter Dunn in his article on the safe delivery of preterm infants where he cites in detail the work of White over two hundred years earlier. Early clamping has been associated not only with increased Respiratory Distress but also with Haemodynamic circulatory problems.

=== Manchester Royal Infirmary ===
When he returned to Manchester in 1751, he agitated so actively for the establishment of an infirmary that the prominent local merchant Joseph Bancroft was persuaded to defray all expenses, provided Dr. White would give the institution his medical services. In 1752 a house was taken at No 10 Garden Street providing a hospital with 12 beds. Three years later, on 9 April 1755, the Manchester Public Infirmary was opened at new premises. He was to remain as Surgeon to the hospital for 38 years.

=== St Mary's Hospital Manchester ===
After a dispute with the board of management Dr. Charles White, Dr. Thomas White and the Drs Hall left the hospital and founded the Lying in Hospital at St Mary's in 1790. Dr. Thomas White, his son, died in a riding accident, but he continued to serve there until after the turn of the century.

=== Manchester Mummy ===
One story is that White was the family physician present at the burial of John Beswick, at which a mourner noticed that John's eyelids were flickering, just as his coffin lid was about to be closed; White confirmed that John was still alive. The supposed corpse regained consciousness a few days later, and lived for many more years.

The incident made John's sister, Hannah Beswick, fearful that she might accidentally be buried alive. Hannah requested in her will that White keep her above Ground for 100 years after her death. Following Hannah's death in 1758 White had her embalmed, White kept Hannah's mummified body in his museum where he had 300 other pathological specimens in this museum. When the museum was made over to the St Mary's hospital the mummy was moved to the attic at Sale Priory. Following his death in 1813 he gave the mummy to Dr Ollier, his personal physician, who donated it on his death to the Museum of the Manchester Natural History Society, There she became known as the Manchester Mummy, or the Mummy of Birchin Bower. Her body was put on display in the museum's entrance hall, described by one visitor in 1844 as "one of the most remarkable objects in the museum".

Following the museum's transfer to Manchester University in 1867, and with the permission of the Bishop of Manchester, Hannah was buried in an unmarked grave in Harpurhey Cemetery on 22 July 1868.

Although this sounds odd to modern ears, Dr. White was following practices that were not uncommon at the time. Others physicians doing likewise included Dr. John Hunter, Dr. William Hunter, Dr. Cruickshank and Dr. Sheldon.

=== Polygenism ===
White spent much his spare time studying Anthropometry. He examined people including sailors of a variety of ethnicities to study anatomical differences. He was influenced by work done by John Hunter which he had seen in London. Like Hunter, he described differences in skull and facial shapes and also the length of forearm and humerus and came to the incorrect conclusion that different 'races' were of separate origins.

White's Account of the Regular Gradation in Man, and in Different Animals and Vegetables (1799) attempted to provide empirical science for the theory of polygenism. White proposed the theory of polygeny, refuting French naturalist Georges-Louis Leclerc, Comte de Buffon's inter-fertility argument – the theory that only the same species can interbreed – pointing to species hybrids such as foxes, wolves and jackals, separate groups that were still able to interbreed. For White, 'races' were separate species, divinely created for their own geographical regions. He concentrated on Africans' and African Americans' differences from Europeans, which led him to believe that people from these areas had derived from separate origins. Though these theories were clearly incorrect and reflected—and contributed to—the racist ideologies of the time, White said that his work must never be "construed so as to give the smallest countenance to the pernicious practice of enslaving mankind, which [he wished] to see abolished throughout the world" and that he was opposed to "assigning to any one a superiority over another, except that which naturally arises from superior bodily strength, mental powers, and industry, or from the consequences attendant upon living in a state of society".

== Family and later life ==
In 1757, White married Ann Bradshaw, whose father had been a high sheriff for the county of Lancaster. They had eight children, four sons and four daughters. Two of his sons had become doctors, but they and his two other sons died before him. In 1803, White suffered an attack of ophthalmia, which initially only affected his left eye, and — with difficulty — he continued to work. In 1811, it affected the right eye and he soon became blind. He died at his home in Sale on 20 February 1813. He was survived by his daughters, one of whom, Anne White, married Sir Richard Clayton, to whom White's thesis on Regular Gradation of man was dedicated.
