= Manchester Mummy =

Body of woman who had a fear of premature burial

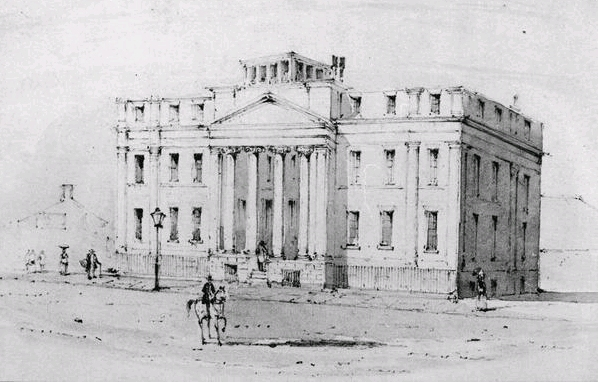
The Museum of the Manchester Natural History Society, c. 1850, where Hannah Beswick's mummified body was displayed

Hannah Beswick (1688 – February 1758), of Birchin Bower in Hollinwood, an area of Oldham in what is now Greater Manchester, England, was a wealthy woman who had a pathological fear of premature burial. Following her death in 1758, her body was embalmed and kept above ground to be periodically checked for signs of life.

The method of embalming was not recorded, but it probably involved replacing the blood with a mixture of turpentine and vermilion. The body was then put in an old clock case and stored in the house of Beswick's family physician, Dr Charles White. Beswick's apparently eccentric will made her a local celebrity, and visitors were allowed to view her at White's house.

Beswick's mummified body was eventually bequeathed to the Museum of the Manchester Natural History Society, where she was put on display and acquired the soubriquet of the Manchester Mummy, or the Mummy of Birchin Bower. The museum's collection was later transferred to Manchester University, when it was decided, with the permission of the Bishop of Manchester, that Beswick should finally be buried. The ceremony took place at Harpurhey Cemetery on 22 July 1868, more than 110 years after her death; the grave is unmarked.

== Background ==
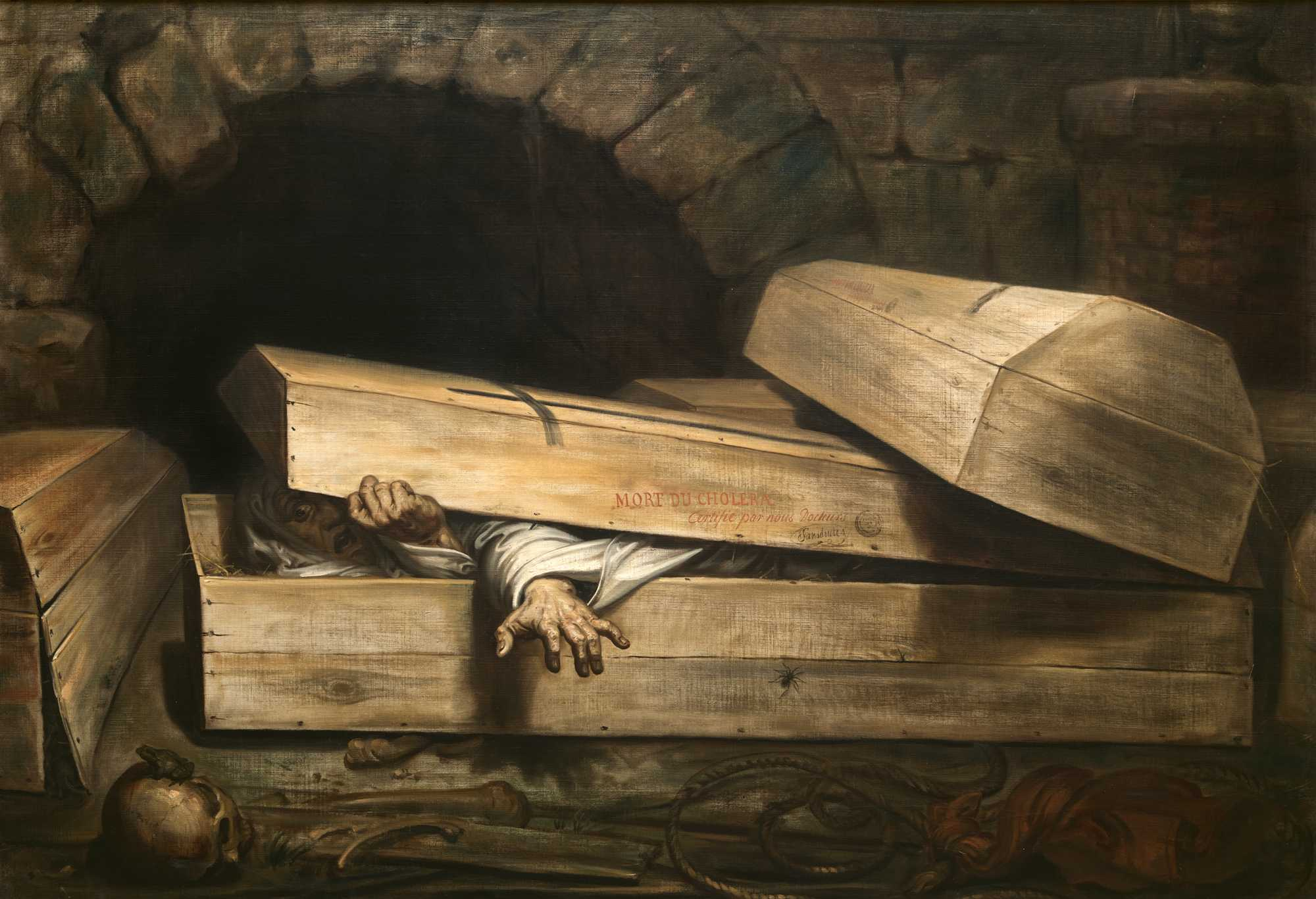
Antoine Wiertz's L'Inhumation précipitée (The Premature Burial), 1854

The mid-18th century saw an upsurge in the public's fear of being mistakenly buried alive, and much debate about the uncertainty of the signs of death. Various suggestions were made to test for signs of life before burial, ranging from pouring vinegar and pepper into the corpse's mouth to applying red hot pokers to the feet, or even into the rectum. Writing in 1895, the physician J. C. Ouseley claimed that as many as 2,700 people were buried prematurely each year in England and Wales; J. Stenson Hooker estimated the figure to be closer to 800.

Hannah Beswick was born in 1688, the daughter of John and Patience Beswick, of Cheetwood Old Hall, Manchester. She inherited considerable wealth from her father who died in 1706. Some years before her own death, one of Hannah's brothers, John, had shown signs of life just as his coffin lid had been about to be closed. A mourner noticed that John's eyelids appeared to be flickering, and on examination the family physician, Dr Charles White, confirmed that he was still alive. John regained consciousness a few days later, and lived for many more years.

Jessie Dobson, Recorder of the Museum of the Royal College of Surgeons of England, has said that there appear to be many "inaccuracies and contradictions" in accounts of the events following Beswick's death in 1758. Many suggest that she left £25,000 (equivalent to about £4 million as of 2025) to White, a pioneer of obstetrics and one of the founders of the Manchester Royal Infirmary, on the condition that her body was kept above ground, and that periodically she was to be checked for signs of life. Beswick's will, however, dated 25 July 1757 (less than a year before her death), states only that White was to receive £100 (£16,000 as of 2025), and that £400 (£62,000 as of 2025) was to be allocated for funeral expenses. Some accounts have suggested that White was an executor of Beswick's will and that he received the £400 himself, from which he was permitted to keep any surplus after the funeral expenses had been paid. Having Beswick embalmed, therefore, allowed him to keep the whole amount. Alternatively, it has been suggested that White was considerably in debt to Beswick, a debt that would have to be repaid after the funeral, which was avoided by her embalming, but Beswick's will names Mary Graeme and Esther Robinson as her executors, not White. In 1866, more than 100 years after her death, the details of Beswick's will were still being disputed.

== Embalming ==
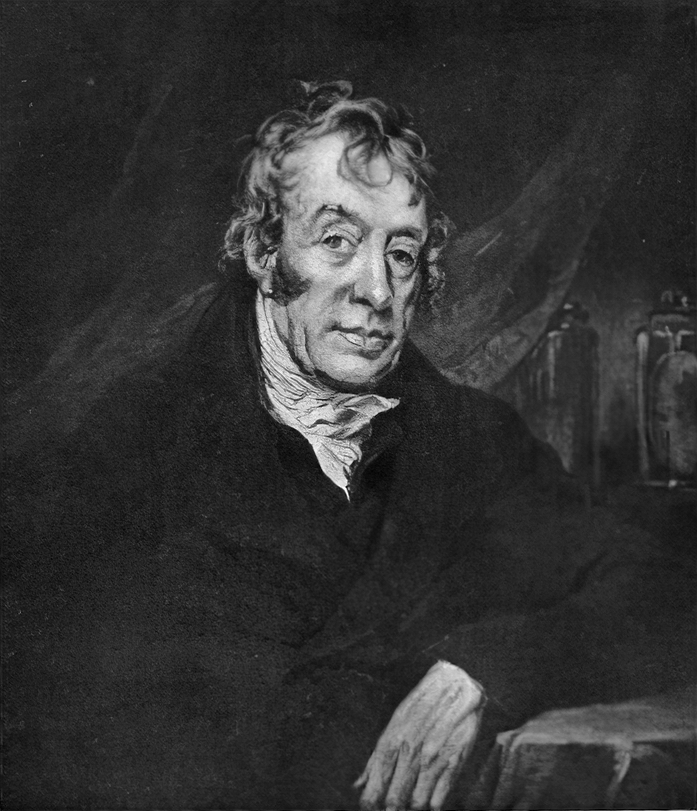
Charles White

There is no mention in Beswick's 1757 will of her desire to be embalmed. It has been suggested that White had been asked to keep Beswick above ground only until it became obvious that she was actually dead, but that he was unable to resist the temptation to add a mummy to his collection of "wet and dry" exhibits, and so made the decision to embalm her. White had developed a particular interest in anatomy while studying medicine in London and was building up a collection of "curiosities", which by the time of his death included the skeleton of Thomas Higgins, a highwayman and sheep-stealer hanged for burglary, as well as Beswick's mummy.

The method of embalming used by White is unrecorded, but in 1748 he had studied under the anatomist William Hunter, who had developed an early system of arterial embalming; therefore, it is likely that White used the same method. The veins and arteries would have been injected with a mixture of turpentine and vermilion, after which the organs would have been removed from the chest and then the abdomen placed in water, to clean them and to reduce their bulk. As much blood as possible would then have been squeezed out of the corpse, and the whole body washed with alcohol. The next stage would have been to replace the organs and to repeat the injection of turpentine and vermilion. The body cavities would then have been filled with a mixture of camphor, nitre and resin, before the body was sewn up and all openings filled with camphor. After a final washing, the body would have been packed into a box containing plaster of Paris, to absorb any moisture, and then probably coated with tar, to preserve it.

== Display ==
Beswick's mummified body was initially kept at Ancoats Hall, the home of another Beswick family member, but it was soon moved to a room in Dr White's home in Sale, Trafford, where it was stored in an old clock case. Beswick's apparently eccentric will made her a celebrity; the author Thomas de Quincey was one of those who went to view her at White's house. Following White's death in 1813, Beswick's body was bequeathed to a Dr Ollier, on whose death in 1828 it was donated to the Museum of the Manchester Natural History Society, where she became known as the Manchester Mummy, or the Mummy of Birchin Bower. She was displayed in the museum's entrance hall, next to a Peruvian and an Egyptian mummy, and her relatives were allowed free access to visit her as they wished. She was described by a visitor in 1844 as "one of the most remarkable objects in the museum". The "cold dark shadow of her mummy hung over Manchester in the middle of the eighteenth century", according to writer Edith Sitwell.

There are no pictures of Beswick. One of the few contemporary accounts of her is provided by Philip Wentworth, a local historian:

The body was well preserved but the face was shrivelled and black. The legs and trunks were tightly bound in a strong cloth such as is used for bed ticks [a stiff kind of mattress cover material] and the body, which was that of a little old woman, was in a glass coffin-shaped case.

Shortly after the museum's transfer to Manchester University in 1867, it was decided that as Beswick was "irrevocably and unmistakably dead", the time had come for her to be buried. However, since 1837, UK law had required that a medical examiner issue a certificate of death before a burial could take place; as Beswick had died in 1758, an appeal had to be made to the Secretary of State, who issued an order for her burial. With the permission of the Bishop of Manchester, Beswick was interred in an unmarked grave in Harpurhey Cemetery on 22 July 1868, more than 110 years after her death.

== Treasure and alleged apparitions ==
Bonnie Prince Charlie entered Manchester at the head of his invading army in 1745, causing Beswick some apprehension over the safety of her money, which she therefore decided to bury. Shortly before her death, she promised to show her relatives where the treasure was hidden, but she did not survive long enough to do so. Her home, Birchin Bower, was converted into workers' tenements following her death. Several of those living there claimed to have seen a figure dressed in a black silk gown and a white cap, and described it as Beswick. After gliding across the house's parlour, the apparition would vanish at one particular flagstone. It is claimed that while digging to fit a new loom soon after Beswick's death, a weaver living there discovered Beswick's hoard of gold, hidden underneath that same flagstone. Oliphant's, a Manchester gold dealer, paid the weaver £3 10s for each gold piece, the equivalent of almost £540 in 2025.

Birchin Bower was eventually demolished to make way for a Ferranti factory, but sightings of the apparition were still reported.

When Beswick's family home, Cheetwood Old Hall, was demolished in 1890 to make way for a brickyard, contractors discovered a double coffin buried underneath the drawing room; the mystery of the burial was never solved, but at the time it was thought to be connected to the Beswick family and Dr White, who had resided at the hall after Beswick removed to Oldham.
