= Thomas Coglan Horsfall =

Manchester-based philanthropist

Thomas Coglan Horsfall (1841–1932) was a noted philanthropist, town planner, writer and founder of the Manchester Art Museum in Ancoats Hall (also known as the Horsfall Museum or Ancoats Museum).

== Life ==
Horsfall was the son of William Horsfall, owner of textile businesses in Halifax and Manchester, England. He was educated in Manchester and Bowdon. Though a partner in his father's businesses, he did not take a very active role due to ill health, and devoted himself to philanthropic work. Horsfall's views were linked to his strongly held Christian faith. He was a supporter of the Church Reform Union, part of the wider movement of Muscular Christianity, which stressed active social engagement. Horsfall was also profoundly influenced by the ideas of John Ruskin, with whom he corresponded extensively.

=== Museum ===
Horsfall was a strong believer in the idea that art had an educational and moral role to play in society. In 1877 he began the movement to establish free galleries for the poor in a letter to the Manchester Guardian. Ruskin's educational art gallery in Sheffield was his model. He wrote, "I may be asked why are we to do this work which it might seem is chiefly work that should be done for the city by itself – by its governing body. The answer is – we must do it, because we are willing to do it and can do it." Horsfall even argued that local employers should donate money to the gallery rather than pay higher wages to their employees because "For we [the middle-class] alone have learnt that money may have other powers than that of buying beer and bread. Higher wages can only lead to greater debasement." In a lecture to the National Association for the Promotion of Social Science, he stated:

A considerable measure of success in spreading knowledge and love of beauty may, I believe, be attained by means of a sensibly managed art gallery; and it is certain that if art Galleries can be made to spread amongst workpeople love of beauty, which includes hatred of ugliness, art galleries will be effective ... I think all such galleries should be, in a district filled with workpeople's houses. As we intend that the museum shall contain only things which must make those who study them 'think nobly' both of the world and its Maker, and of that wonderful human nature whose powers are revealed by art, we feel that no sensible person can object to its being open on Sunday afternoons and evenings, as well as on the evenings of all work days."

The gallery moved to Ancoats Hall in 1886. In keeping with his moral views, no nudes were displayed at the gallery. A room in the gallery was furnished by William Morris as an example of aesthetic design. According to historian Shelagh Wilson, the gallery was popular as a respectable alternative attraction to pubs and music halls, but by the early 20th century it was unable to compete with new forms of popular entertainment. When a cinema opened nearby, attendance dropped dramatically.

=== Other activities ===
Horsfall was also a strong supporter of the Settlement movement, which sought to place the educated middle classes in socially deprived areas. He gave financial support to Toynbee Hall and was linked to the work of Samuel Barnett in Whitechapel, London. The Manchester University Settlement grew out of this, based at Ancoats under Horsfall's leadership. Along with T. R. Marr, Horsfall set up the Citizens' Association for the Improvement of the Unwholesome Dwellings and Surroundings of the People, to eliminate slum housing.

In 1900, Horsfall joined with Henry Birchenough to instigate the Patriotic Association of Macclesfield, which was envisaged as a feeder for the local Volunteer Force. Subsequently, he became treasurer of the Association.

In addition, Horsfall took an interest in improving the air quality of Manchester which, as the first industrial city, left much to be desired. His extensive travels in Europe reinforced this desire for change as he was able to contrast his dingy, smoke-laden home, where even vegetation in the new municipal parks struggled to survive, with the much cleaner and appealing cities that he visited. He was a member of the Manchester and Salford Noxious Vapours Abatement Association (later known as the Smoke Abatement League).

=== Personal life ===
In 1878 Horsfall married Frances Emma Reeves. The couple had three daughters. He died in 1932 at the age of 90.

== Selected publications ==
- The Study of Beauty, and Art in Large Towns (Two papers by T.C. Horsfall, with an Introduction by John Ruskin). Macmillan and Company, 1883.
- The Relation of Town-planning to the National Life. 1908.
