= Hare and Hounds =

Hare and Hounds may refer to:

== Buildings ==
- Hare and Hounds, East Sheen, a listed pub in London, England
- Hare and Hounds, Kings Heath, a listed pub and music venue in Birmingham, England
- Hare and Hounds, Manchester, a listed pub in Manchester, England
- Hare and Hounds, St Albans, a listed pub in Hertfordshire, England
- Hare and Hounds, Uppermill, a listed pub in Greater Manchester, England

== Games ==
- Paper chase (game), a running race game where a "hare" player leaves a trail of paper for the "hounds" to follow
- Hare and Hounds (board game), a strategy board game where three hounds attempt to trap a hare

== Sport ==
- Cambridge University Hare and Hounds, the cross-country running club of the University of Cambridge
- Thames Hare and Hounds, the oldest adult cross-country running club in the world
- Wrexham Hare and Hounds Club (c. 1873–c. 1888), a Welsh football and athletics club
