= Marble Arch (disambiguation) =

Marble Arch is a landmark in London, UK.

Marble Arch may also refer to:

== Places ==
- Marble Arch, a natural limestone arch located in the Marble Arch Caves Global Geopark, in Northern Ireland

- Marble Arch Caves, a cave system in Northern Ireland

- Marble Arch Cave (Gibraltar), a cave on Gibraltar
- Marble Arch Inn, a historic pub in Manchester, UK
- Marble Arch Mound, a temporary, artificial hill located next to Marble Arch in London, UK
- Marble Arch tube station, an underground train station in London, UK
- Arch of the Philaeni, a now-demolished landmark in Libya, nicknamed the "Marble Arch"

== Other uses ==
- Marble Arch Records, a British record label
- Odeon Marble Arch, a cinema in London, UK
- Western Marble Arch Synagogue, a Jewish place of worship in central London, UK
