= Marble Brewery (Manchester) =

Microbrewery based in Manchester, England

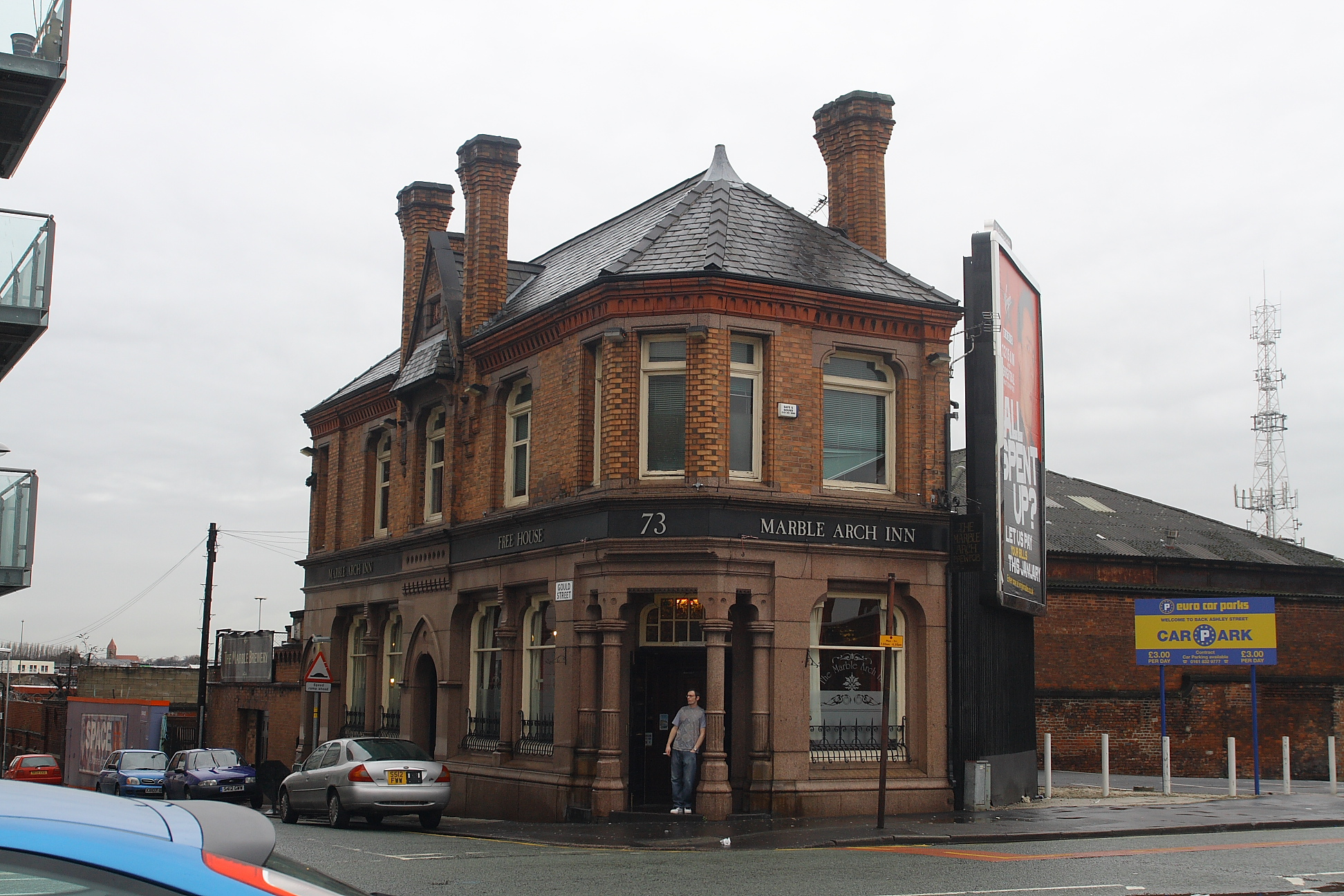
The Marble Arch Inn, home of the Marble Brewery

The Marble Brewery is a microbrewery in Manchester, England which makes cask ale from organic and vegetarian ingredients.

The original brewery consisted of a five-barrel plant, designed and installed by Patrick Poole, former proprietor of the West Coast Brewing Company. The copper and hot liquor tank were situated in the back of the Marble Arch Inn behind glass observation windows. The fermenters and conditioning tanks were in the cellars.

Due to increased production the brewery expanded in 2011 to 12-barrel capacity, and the brewery was moved from the back room of the Marble Arch pub to under one of the railway arches on Williamson Street, a short distance away. In 2019 there was a further move and expansion to premises in Salford.

== Beers ==
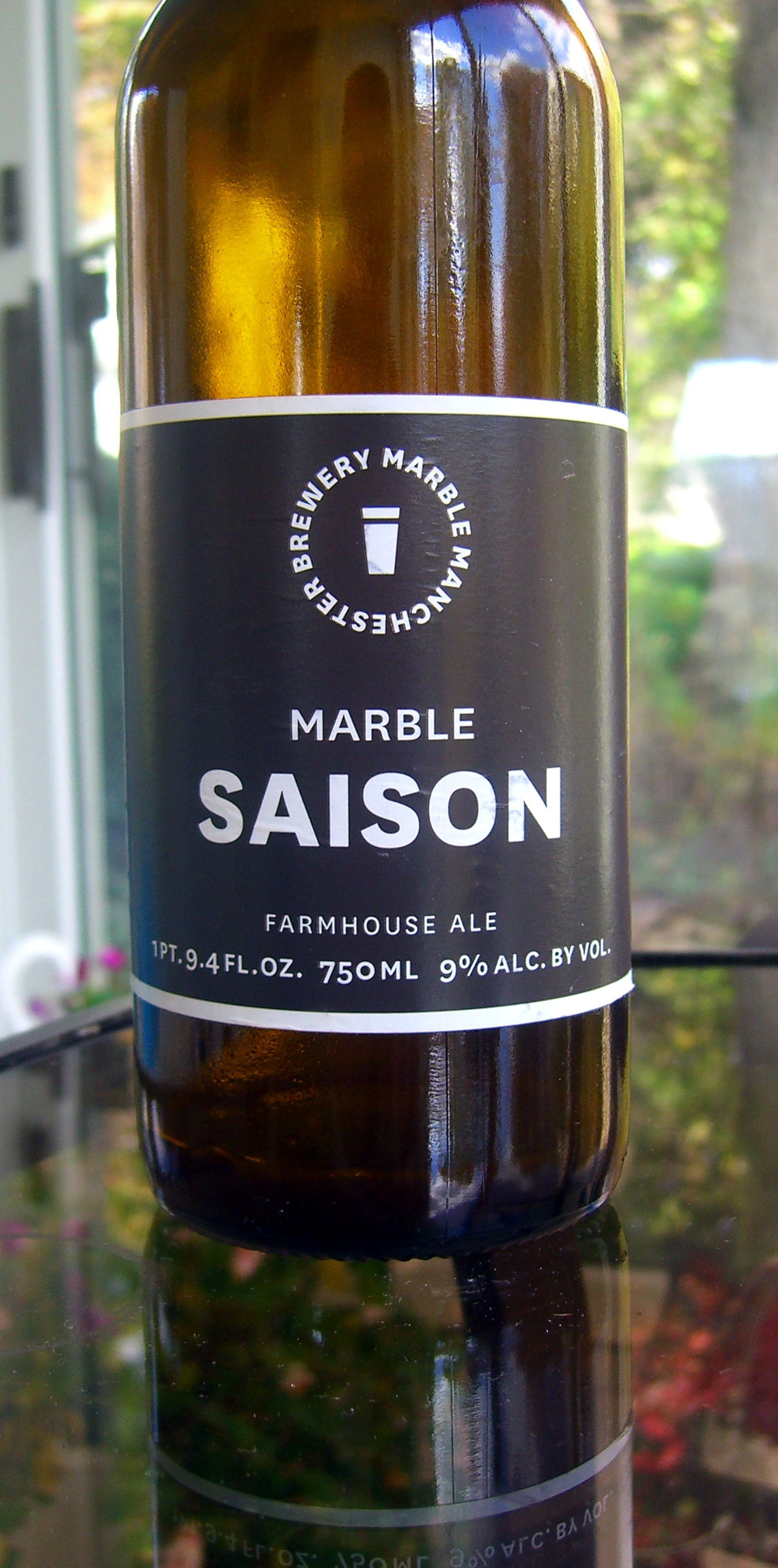
Marble Saison

In 2000 the beers became strictly organic and later the same year they became strictly vegan. Marble's ingredients are sourced from non-intensive agriculture and they do not use isinglass finings, usually made from the swim bladder of the sturgeon, to clear the beer. Marble's then head brewer, James Campbell, said "We're busier than ever. The beer sells because it tastes good, but the vegetarian side is proving good for business. I've had people tell me that they hadn't been able to drink a pint of beer since they became vegetarians 10 years before. Then they found us."

The original intention was not to brew anything at less than 4% ABV, although there are now several exceptions to this, with 3.8% being the lowest strength available.

Current and previous beers include:

- Campbell Tawny 4.5%, (special for August 2006).
- Chocolate 5.5%, (seasonal for winter).
- Chorlton Bitter 3.8%, discontinued.
- Chorlton Cum Hazy 3.8%, irregular.
- Cloudy Marble 4.0%, irregular.
- Dade's Bitter 3.8%, discontinued.
- Dobber Strong 6.5%, discontinued.
- Driscoll Tawny 3.8%, (special for August 2006).
- Festival, 4.4%, (originally brewed for the Manchester Food and Drink festival 2005).
- Ginger Beer 6.0%, discontinued.
- Ginger Marble 4.5%, regular - nominated for 2006 'Best Vegetarian Pint' by The Vegetarian Society.
- Gould Street Bitter (G.S.B.) 3.8%, regular.
- Lagonda IPA 5.2%, regular.
- Liberty IPA 4.6%, discontinued.
- Manchester Bitter 4.2%, regular.
- Marble Bitter 3.9%, irregular.
- Marble Chocolate Heavy 5.5%, irregular.
- Marble Pint 3.9%, regular.
- McKenna's Revenge Porter 5.0%, discontinued.
- McKenna's Reprise Porter 4.5%, seasonal.
- Northern Quarter (also known as N/4 Bitter) 3.8%, discontinued.
- Old Lag 5.0%, discontinued.
- Organic Festival Ale 4.0%, discontinued.
- Port Stout 4.7%, Christmas seasonal.
- Road Rider 4.3%, irregular.
- Short Back & Sides 3.8%, discontinued.
- Spooky Marble 3.8%, brewed for Halloween 1998, discontinued.
- Stoneham Lager 4.4%, discontinued.
- Stronge Tawny 5.7%, (special for August 2006).
- Summer Marble 4.5%, seasonal.
- Totally Marbled 5.0%, discontinued.
- Utility IPA 6.5%, seasonal.
- Uncut Amber 4.7%, irregular.
- Wee Star 9.0%, discontinued.

== Pubs ==
=== Marble Arch Inn ===
The Marble Arch Inn was built in 1888 in Ancoats, with a façade of polished red granite. It became a Grade II listed building on 20 June 1988. Inside, the pub has a high, glazed ceiling, ceramic walls and a bar that slopes down with the hill.

After years in the hands of various breweries, it was bought by a local CAMRA member, John Worthington, in 1984 who made it a free house. There have been subsequent changes of ownership, and structural alterations to accommodate the brewing plant.

=== Former pubs ===
The Marble Beer House in Chorlton-cum-Hardy was the second outlet for Marble beers. However, this was sold and is now known as just "The Beer House".

57 Thomas St in the Northern Quarter of Manchester city centre was the third outlet for Marble beers. This was sold in summer 2020 to Fierce Beers brewery.

== See also ==
- List of breweries in England
