= Crown and Kettle =

Listed pub in Manchester, England

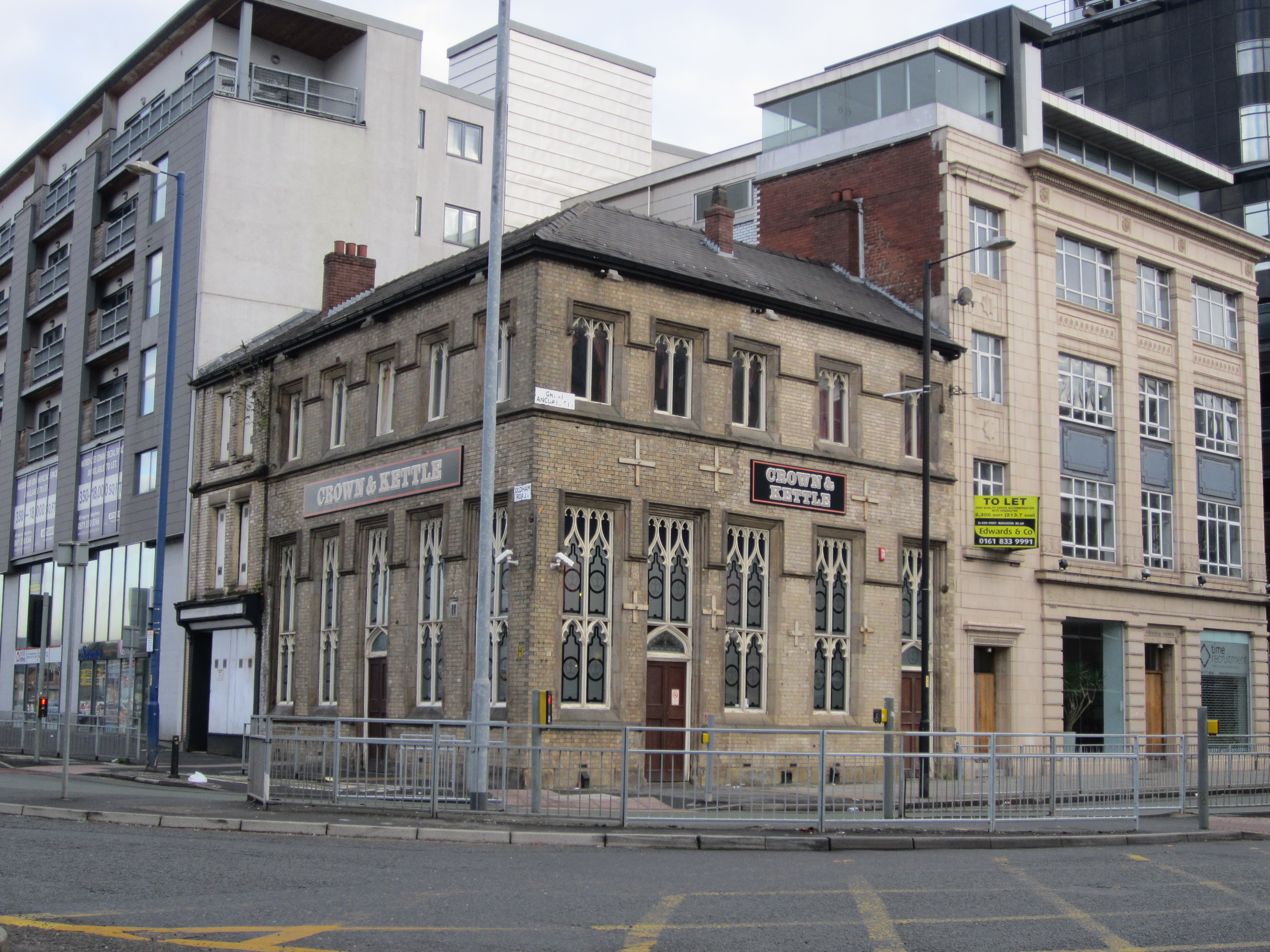
- The pub in 2014

General information
- Type: Public house
- Architectural style: Gothic
- Location: 2 Oldham Road, Ancoats, Manchester, England
- Coordinates: 53.4852°N 2.2297°W
- Year built: Early 19th century (probable)

Technical details
- Floor count: 2

Design and construction
- Designations

Listed Building – Grade II
- Official name: Crown and Kettle public house
- Designated: 3 October 1974
- Reference no.: 1246276

Other information
- Public transit: Manchester Victoria

Website
- thecrownandkettle.com

The Crown and Kettle is a Grade II listed public house on the corner of Oldham Road and Great Ancoats Street in the Ancoats area of Manchester, England. Dating from around 1800 and originally known as the Iron Dish & Cob of Coal, it stands on a site recorded as early as 1734. After closing in 1989 following a disturbance and later suffering an arson attack, the pub underwent major restoration and reopened in 2005, retaining a partly restored plaster ceiling and other historic interior features. The Campaign for Real Ale (CAMRA) regards it as a "pub with outstanding conversion or restoration".

== History ==
The pub was originally opened around 1800 in a Gothic style with traceried windows and was previously known as the 'Iron Dish & Cob of Coal'. There are records of a building being in this location since as early as 1734, with it at one time serving as a courthouse.

The mahogany panelling originally installed within the small snug is claimed to have been sourced from one of a pair of British rigid airships, R100 or R101.

On 3 October 1974, the Crown and Kettle became a Grade II listed building.

In 1989 the pub was closed by Manchester City Council following a fight between football fans, and suffered an arson attack in the 1990s. It reopened in 2005 following restoration work with Historic England, including to the plaster ceiling which was restored in one bar and left in an unrestored state in the other. The stone columns that are still present used to hold chandeliers hanging from ceiling roses. The Campaign for Real Ale (CAMRA) considers it a "pub with outstanding conversion or restoration". The interior was refurbished again in 2020.

In 2023 the Crown and Kettle was recognised as one of the best pubs in the North West when it was named as a county winner in the National Pub & Bar Awards.

== Architecture ==
The building is constructed of buff brick with stone detailing and has a hipped slate roof. It stands on a corner plot and is roughly square in shape. There are two storeys, arranged in five bays on each side.

The ground floor has very tall paired windows with decorative Gothic‑style patterns and continuous moulded heads. On the Oldham Road side, the central opening includes a doorway beneath the window, with a four‑centred arched fanlight. Similar entrances appear in the second and fifth bays on the Great Ancoats Street frontage. The upper floor has shorter paired windows with cusped heads, again linked by moulded features.

Inside, the ceiling is notable for its unusually large Gothic pendants.

== See also ==
- Listed buildings in Manchester-M4
- Listed pubs in Manchester
