= Hope Mill =

Former cotton mill in Manchester, England

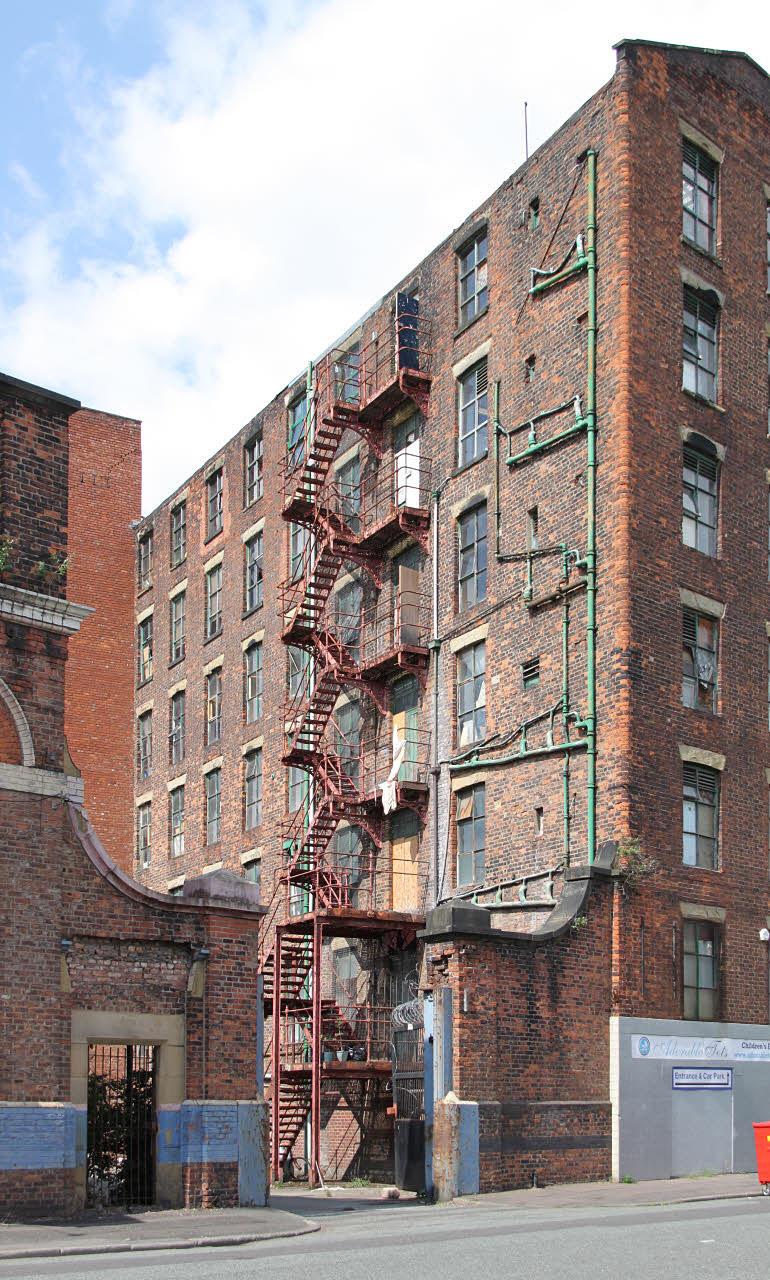
- Hope Mill in 2013

- Location within Greater Manchester

General information
- Type: Cotton mill
- Location: Pollard Street, Ancoats, Manchester, England
- Coordinates: 53.4831°N 2.2164°W
- Year built: 1824
- Renovated: Late 19th and 20th century (added and altered)
- Client: Joseph Clarke and Sons
- Owner: Hope Mill Partnership LLP

Design and construction
- Designations

Listed Building – Grade II*
- Official name: Hope Mill
- Designated: 6 June 1994
- Reference no.: 1246950

Website
- www.hopemill.co.uk

Hope Mill is a Grade II* listed former cotton mill on Pollard Street in Ancoats, an area of Manchester, England. Built in 1824 for Joseph Clarke and Sons, it was a steam-powered spinning mill with engines supplied by Boulton and Watt. In the early 20th century it was used by John Hetherington and Sons, manufacturers of textile machinery. The building had become derelict by the mid‑20th century, but was restored in 2001 and now accommodates a range of creative industries, including the Hope Mill Theatre.

== History ==
By the early 19th century, Manchester had become one of the world's great textile-producing cities. Its population rose from 75,000 in 1801, to over 300,000 fifty years later. The inner-city area of Ancoats became the main centre for factories and mills; largely open fields in the 1780s, "it became one of the most intensely developed industrial centres in the world". The Prussian court architect, Karl Friedrich Schinkel, visiting in 1824, wrote, "since the war 400 large new factories for cotton spinning have been built, several of them the size of the Royal Palace in Berlin". Hope Mill was built in 1824 for Joseph Clarke and Sons, textile spinners and fustian weavers. It was a steam-powered mill, with engines supplied by Boulton and Watt.

In the early 20th century, Hope Mill was used by John Hetherington and Sons, a firm that produced machinery for the textile industry and was based at their Vulcan Works premises further along Pollard Street.

By the mid-20th century, the building had become derelict. On 6 June 1994, Hope Mill was designated a Grade II* listed building. In 2001 it was bought and refurbished by a private partnership and now houses a range of creative industries, including the Hope Mill Theatre.

== Architecture ==
The building is constructed of red brick with sandstone detailing and has two pitched roofs covered in Welsh slate. It is rectangular, set on a north‑west to south‑east axis, and includes its original engine house, boiler house and chimney. It stands between the Ashton Canal and Pollard Street.

The main block is a seven‑storey spinning mill of 20 bays, believed to have been put up in one main, though possibly interrupted, building phase. The window openings are evenly spaced and rectangular, with stone sills and simple heads, and most now contain later 20th‑century frames. The east side retains original doorways in bays four and six, each framed in sandstone with a rounded arch and masonry cut to give a textured finish. The north end wall has four blocked arched openings that once led into the internal boiler house. The double‑pitched roof sits behind a low gable wall with stone coping.

The four‑bay end wall has a vertical stack of double loading doors to the left of centre, now reached by a modern metal fire escape. At the north end of the east side, an area thought to have been a warehouse shows altered loading doors and a hoist beam at the upper level. The west side contains the remains of the original tapered chimney, shortened and set between the former engine and boiler houses.

== See also ==
- Grade II* listed buildings in Greater Manchester
- Listed buildings in Manchester-M4

== Sources ==
- Hartwell, Clare; Hyde, Matthew; Pevsner, Nikolaus (2004). Lancashire: Manchester and the South East. The Buildings of England. New Haven, CT; London: Yale University Press. ISBN 0-300-10583-5.
