= Listed buildings in Manchester-M4 =

Manchester is a city in Northwest England. The M4 postcode area is to the northeast of the city centre, and includes part of the Northern Quarter, part of New Islington, and the area of Ancoats. This postcode area contains 69 listed buildings that are recorded in the National Heritage List for England. Of these, eight are listed at Grade II*, the middle of the three grades, and the others are at Grade II, the lowest grade.

The prosperity of Manchester was due mainly to the growth of the textile industry in the Industrial Revolution, and the area covered in this list is mainly industrial. Most of the listed buildings are survivors from this industry, particularly former cotton mills in Ancoats that have been altered and used for other purposes. Other remnants of this industry, and listed, are houses containing former workshops, and warehouses. Industry was stimulated by the development of the canal system in the 18th century, and two canals pass through the area, the Rochdale Canal and the Ashton Canal. The listed buildings associated with these are locks, bridges, a retaining wall, and a lock keeper's cottage. During the late 19th and early 20th centuries the Cooperative Wholesale Society built large offices and warehouses in the area, and these are listed. The other listed buildings in the area include houses, shops, public houses, a hotel, churches, market halls, a schoolroom, a women's refuge, a former ragged school. a former fire and police station, a corn exchange, and a bank, many of which have been converted for other uses or are unused.

== Key ==
Grade	Criteria
II*	Particularly important buildings of more than special interest
II	Buildings of national importance and special interest

== Buildings ==
Name and location	Photograph	Date	Notes	Grade
42, 44 and 46 Thomas Street; 53.48385°N 2.23687°W		18th century	A group of six former industrial buildings, which include 41, 43 and 45 Back Turner Street. They are in brick with tile roofs, and have three storeys and cellars. The buildings back on to each other, those in Thomas Street have a double-depth plan, and those on back Turner Street are single-depth, originally with a yard between them.	II
31–35 Thomas Street; 53.48430°N 2.23688°W		Late 18th century	A row of three houses, possibly with workshops, later shops, in red brick with a slate roof. There are three low storeys and cellars, a double-depth plan, and rear extensions. Nos. 31 and 35 have round-headed doorways, and the doorway of No. 33 has a square head; all have doorcases with Tuscan pilasters, fanlights, and open pediments. The shop windows have cornices on consoles. Some of the windows on the upper floors are sashes, and others are casements.	II
105 Oldham Street; 53.48385°N 2.23405°W		Late 18th century (probable)	A house, later a shop, in brick with a wooden modillioned eaves cornice and a slate roof. It has three low storeys and two bays. On the ground floor is a modern shop front and on the upper floors are altered windows.	II
The City public house 53.48442°N 2.23329°W		Late 18th century (probable)	The former public house, which was altered in about 1870, is in stuccoed brick with a coped parapet. There are three storeys and two bays. On the ground floor are pilasters with scrolled capitals, carved floral panels, a round-headed doorway to left, a round-headed window to right, and an arched rectangular window in centre, all with carved spandrels and fanlights. Above is a dentilled frieze and a painted fascia with ball finials. On the upper floors are sash windows between which are painted panels, on the upper floor with the Royal Arms.	II
Lock No. 1, Ashton Canal; 53.48009°N 2.22309°W		c. 1792–1799	The lock is constructed from large blocks of millstone grit and has wooden gates. The chamber is narrow, about 7 feet (2.1 m) wide, and there is an overflow channel on the south side. There is a central island with curved tapered ends, and at the lower end are stone staircases.	II
Lock No. 2, Ashton Canal; 53.48068°N 2.22146°W		c. 1792–1799	The lock is constructed from large blocks of millstone grit and has wooden gates. The chamber is narrow, about 7 feet (2.1 m) wide, there is an overflow channel on the south side, and stone staircases flanking the lower entry at the west side.	II
Lock No. 3, Ashton Canal; 53.48146°N 2.22016°W		c. 1792–1799	he lock is constructed from large blocks of millstone grit and has wooden gates. The chamber is narrow, about 7 feet (2.1 m) wide, there is an overflow channel on the south side, stone staircases flanking the lower entry at the west side, and a convex curved retaining wall at east end of south side.	II
Decker Mill and Old Mill; 53.48378°N 2.22638°W		1798	A pair of cotton spinning mills, later used for other purposes. Old Mill is the older, and Decker Mill was added to the east, forming a continuous range, in 1802. The mills are in brown brick with slate roofs. They have seven storeys, Old Mill has 11 bays, and Decker Mill has 10 bays. They contain small windows with flat-arched heads. At the rear are a stair tower and two ventilation towers. Also at the rear are a detached engine house and an octagonal chimney stack with a moulded cap.	II*
1 Kelvin Street; 53.48378°N 2.23690°W		Late 18th or early 19th century	A house and former workshop in brick with stone dressings, three storeys and a basement, and one bay. There are railings around the basement area, and steps lead up to a round-headed doorway with a fanlight. To the left and on the middle floor are segmental-headed sash windows, and on the top floor is a five-light workshop window with three horizontally-sliding sashes.	II
7 Kelvin Street; 53.48386°N 2.23675°W		Late 18th or early 19th century	A small warehouse in brown brick with a slate roof. It has a rectangular plan, on a corner site, with three storeys, three bays on the front and four on the left return. On the front is a loading slot. There are also doorways, and windows, most of which are sashes, some with segmental-arched heads and some with flat-arched heads.	II
36 and 38 Back Turner Street; 53.48390°N 2.23702°W		Late 18th or early 19th century	A pair of houses with former workshops in red brick with stone dressings. They both have three storeys and cellars, with steps leading up to doorways, and segmental-headed windows with stone sills and lintels. No. 36 has three bays, and No. 38 has one bay, and both have cellar doorways opening on to the street.	II
49–53 Tib Street; 53.48429°N 2.23417°W		Late 18th or early 19th century	A row of houses with workshops, later shops, in brick with a slate roof. There are three storeys, a double-depth plan, and a rear wing. The ground floor has been altered, on the middle floor are segmental-headed windows, and on the upper floor are multi-light workshop windows. In the right return is a loading door with a hoist beam above.	II
Workshops, shop and warehouse, Back Turner Street; 53.48383°N 2.23695°W		Late 18th or early 19th century	The earlier part is the warehouse, the rest following later in the 19th century. The building is in red brick with sandstone dressings and roofs of slate and sheet covering. The warehouse to the left has four storeys and one bay, a door to the right, sash windows, a loading bay on the left, and a parapet. The workshop and shop have four storeys and a basement and three bays. On the ground floor are pilasters, a shop window to the left, steps leading up to a doorway in the centre, and a tall window to the right. On the first and second floors are sash windows with shallow-arched heads, on the top floor is a wide semicircular window, and at the top is a coped gable and corbel decoration.	II
Bridge No. 4, Ashton Canal; 53.48287°N 2.21774°W		c. 1800	The bridge carries Carruthers Street over the canal. It consists of cast-iron beams between brick abutments with rounded corners in sandstone. There are pilasters at the ends, a moulded cornice and a parapet.	II
Bridge No. 5, Ashton Canal; 53.48399°N 2.21579°W		c. 1800	The bridge carries Beswick Street over the canal. It consists of a low segmental arch in brown brick rising from a sandstone base. The bridge has a keystone, a plate with the bridge number, pilasters, a stone band, and a brick parapet with stone coping.	II
Hare and Hounds; 53.48510°N 2.23786°W		c. 1800	A public house that was altered in the late 19th century, and the interior remodelled in about 1925. It is in brick, with glazed tile cladding on the ground floor at the front, and a Welsh slate roof. There are three storeys at the front and four at the rear. On the ground floor is a doorway on the left, and a three-light mullioned window to the right. There are sash windows on the middle floor, and on the top floor are casement windows with transoms. Much of the original structure and the internal remodelling have been retained.	II
Lock keeper's cottage, Ashton Canal; 53.48058°N 2.22198°W		c. 1800	The lock keeper's cottage stands adjacent to Lock No. 2 on the canal, it is in brown brick, and has a slate roof. There is a rectangular double-depth plan, two storeys at the front and three at the rear, three bays, and a single-storey lean-to extension on the right. At the rear facing the canal are doorways in the basement. The windows have altered glazing, and on the ground floor they have segmental heads.	II
Lock No. 82, Rochdale Canal; 53.48259°N 2.22815°W		c. 1800	The lock, now disused, is in sandstone, and has a chamber 14 feet (4.3 m) wide. At the upper end is a weir, and at the upper end is a 20th-century bridge.	II
Towpath bridge, Ashton Canal; 53.48061°N 2.22226°W		c. 1800	The bridge carries the towpath over the Islington Branch of the canal. It is in sandstone, and consists of a single elliptical arch, with a keystone, an arch band, and a parapet with rounded stone coping. The deck is cobbled.	II
Union Bridge; 53.49052°N 2.23588°W	—	Late 18th or early 19th century	A bridge, now closed, carrying a road over the River Irk. It is in sandstone, and consists of a single low segmental arch with voussoirs. There is no parapet, but iron railings on the south side.	II
New Mill; 53.48428°N 2.22695°W		1804	A cotton spinning mill, with an internal construction of iron and timber, walls in red brick, and a slate roof. There are six storeys, a front of 22 bays, and gabled sides of four bays. At the rear is a semicircular stair turret, and narrow vent towers, and there is a detached engine house.	II*
Retaining wall, Rochdale Canal; 53.48341°N 2.22688°W		1804	The wall runs between the canal and Redhill Street. It is in red brick up to the level of the street, and above this there is a parapet of massive slabs of millstone grit with rounded tops. At the east end is a massive block with the remains of iron fittings.	II
Former warehouse and offices of Old Mill, Decker Mill, and New Mill; 53.48393°N 2.22701°W	—	c. 1806	The building is in brick with a slate roof. It has a central entrance flanked by ranges with ten bays, the right range has four storeys, and the left range has been reduced to two storeys. In the centre is a stone arch with voussoirs, a three-light window above and an oriel window to the south. The other windows have cambered heads.	II
29 Shude Hill; 53.48481°N 2.23918°W		c. 1810	A brick warehouse, stuccoed at the front, with sill bands, bracketed eaves, and a hipped slate roof. It has three storeys, a right-angled Z-shaped plan, and a front of three bays. The front has a plinth and a rusticated ground floor containing a central doorway and almost-square windows with altered glazing. On the middle floor is a full-width three-light window with slender, twisted cast-iron columns. Elsewhere, many of the windows have segmental heads, most are sashes, and others are casements.	II
Sedgwick Mill; 53.48344°N 2.22712°W		1818–1820	A cotton mill built in red brick. The original part has eight storeys, and a U-shaped plan with a front of 17 bays and eight-bay wings to the rear. The courtyard was completed in about 1820 by the addition of a northwest range. In 1868 Sedgwick New Mill was built as a parallel wing to the north, and is attached to the west wing of Sedgwick Mill; this has five storeys and 15 bays. A two-storey range was added to the west of the new mill in about 1888–98.	II
Beehive Mill; 53.48498°N 2.22596°W		Early 1820s	A cotton spinning mill with a warehouse block added in 1824, and extended in about 1848, it was converted into offices in 1996. There are two blocks and later extensions, with a cast-iron-and-timber internal construction and cladding in brick. The earlier block has an L-shaped plan, six storeys, and fronts of 13 and three bays, and the later part has five storeys and 13 bays.	II*
Hope Mill; 53.48313°N 2.21645°W		1824	A cotton mill later divided into smaller units for other purposes, it is in red brick with sandstone dressings and a Welsh slate roof. There are seven storeys and fronts of 20 and four bays. The mill contains an integral engine house, a boiler house and a chimney, now truncated. The doorways have round heads, and the windows have stone sills and wedge lintels. At the north end are four blocked segmental headed openings.	II*
Crown and Kettle public house 53.48483°N 2.23234°W		Early 19th century (probable)	The public house is in buff brick with stone dressings and a hipped slate roof. It has a square plan on a corner site, with two storeys and five bays on each front. On the ground floor are tall transomed windows containing Gothic tracery, and in the lower parts of three of them are doorways that have fanlights with four-centred arched heads. On the upper floor are smaller windows with cusped heads. All the windows have linked hood moulds.	II
Former doctor's surgery 53.48408°N 2.23104°W	—	Early 19th century (probable)	A house that was converted into a doctor's surgery in Arts and Crafts style in about 1887. It is in red brick on a canted plinth, with stone dressings, sill bands, a moulded cornice, and a slate roof. There is an L-shaped plan, with a main range of three storeys and four narrow bays, and a later two-storey outshut at the rear. On the ground floor, the outer bays contain round-headed windows with flowers in the tympanum, between which is a smaller window and a doorway with a fanlight. The middle floor contains a canted oriel window, on the top floor are two pairs of windows, and there is another oriel window at the rear. Many of the original internal decorative features have been retained.	II
Castle Hotel; 53.48372°N 2.23381°W		Early to mid-19th century	A public house with brown glazed terracotta on the ground floor and stuccoed above, and with a modillioned eaves cornice. There are three low storeys and a symmetrical front of three bays. On the ground floor is a central window flanked by doorways, and above is a lettered fascia, and a moulded cornice on consoles. On the upper floors are sash windows with moulded architraves.	II
Spectator Mill; 53.48363°N 2.21614°W	—	Early to mid-19th century	A silk mill, later used for other purposes, it is in brown brick with some sandstone dressings. The mill has a rectangular plan, six storeys and seven bays, a tower between the second and third bays, and another tower at the west end. The doorway has a round head, and the windows have segmental heads.	II
Warehouse, workshop and shops, Turner Street; 53.48383°N 2.23695°W	—	Early to mid-19th century	The workshop was added in the late 19th century. The building is in red brick with sandstone dressings and a slate roof. There are four storeys with a basement, and five bays. The fourth bay contains loading bays with a metal lintel and a hoist at the top.	II
Former Church of All Souls; 53.48038°N 2.21569°W		1839–40	A Commissioners' church designed by William Haley in Romanesque style, it is in brown brick with some stone dressings and a slate roof. The church consists of a plain rectangle with small projections at the east and west ends. At the corners of the church and on the corners of the projections are square pilasters rising to pinnacles with pyramidal roofs. At the west end is a round-headed doorway with shafts, above which is interlacing blind arcading, a wheel window, a corbel table, and a gable containing a louvred ventilator. The windows are round-headed lancets, and at the east end is a triple lancet window and an oculus above in the gable. (Note: The former church was demolished in October 2026, but remains on the National Heritage List for England until formally delisted. Historic England states that a building is only removed "if it no longer meets… special architectural or historic interest" and that demolition does not automatically trigger removal. Their guidance notes that "sometimes permission is given… to demolish a listed building and it remains technically listed," and delisting normally requires confirmation from the local planning authority that the building was legally demolished before the Secretary of State can remove it from the list.)	II
Former synagogue 53.49006°N 2.24199°W		c. 1840	Originally a chapel, later a synagogue, then used for other purposes, it is built in sandstone and is in Classical style. It has two storeys and a basement, and a symmetrical entrance front with three bays and one storey. The central bay projects forward on a plinth, with pilasters, an entablature, a parapet, and a pediment. In the centre is a large arch containing a square-headed doorway with a moulded architrave and a cornice on consoles. This is flanked by tall round-headed windows, and along the sides are giant pilasters between the windows.	II
Doubling Mill and Fireproof Mill; 53.48409°N 2.22588°W		1842	A pair of cotton mills with warehousing, in red brick with slate roofs, and with an internal construction of iron. They form an L-shaped plan, both with five storeys, Fireproof Mill has seven bays with an entrance yard on the left, and Doubling Mill has eight bays and incorporates an engine houses serving both mills. At the rear of Doubling Mill is a circular stair tower, and there is a small ventilation tower at the rear of Fireproof Mill. The mills were converted into offices in 2002.	II*
Warehouse, Sharp Street; 53.48817°N 2.23446°W	—	Mid-19th century (probable)	The small warehouse, later converted for other uses, is in brick and on a corner site. There are four storeys and fronts of three bays. The windows have segmental heads, and in the Shape Street front is a four-stage loading slot.	II
Sharp Street Ragged School; 53.48842°N 2.23482°W		1853	The ragged school, later used for other purposes, was rebuilt in 1869. It is in red brick with pilasters, corbel tables, and a slate roof. There are two storeys, a rectangular plan, and a front of eight bays. On the ground floor is a round-headed doorway and windows with segmental heads, and on the upper floor are paired round-headed windows.	II
Smithfield Market Hall; 53.48549°N 2.23487°W		1857	The wholesale market hall, now a food hall, has an iron frame, sandstone walls, and a roof in glass and slate. It has a rectangular plan, and is in Classical style. The front is symmetrical with a single storey and five bays, the central bay projecting slightly. The building is on a moulded plinth, with quoins, a lettered frieze, a dentilled cornice, and a parapet with panels and upstands, In the centre is a round-headed entrance with an ornamental cast-iron fanlight, voussoirs, and a bull's-head keystone. Around this is a tetrastyle portico with Corinthian-style pilasters, and a pediment with an acroterion. In the outer bays are Venetian-style windows with voussoirs and keystones. The bays between have shuttered openings, above which are panels with circular openings.	II
Former St Peter's Church; 53.48463°N 2.22817°W		1859–60	The church, later used for other uses and restored in 1998–99, is in red brick with dressings in white brick, and slate roofs. It is in Romanesque style, and consists of a nave with a clerestory, north and south aisles, north and south transepts, a chancel with a curved apse, and a northwest tower. All the windows have round heads in white brick, and around the church are Lombard friezes. The tower has a round-headed north doorway with shafts and an ornamental keystone. The top stage of the tower is set back and has a swept pyramidal roof. Around the clerestory are arcades of windows with blind arcades between.	II
104 and 106 High Street; 53.48471°N 2.23652°W		c. 1860–1870	A small warehouse, later used for other purposes, it is in red brick with sandstone dressings, sill bands, a moulded cornice, a parapet with moulded coping, and a slate roof. It has a rectangular plan, on a corner site, and is in the style of an Italian palazzo. There are four storeys, and front of four and six bays. On the ground floor are pilasters, shop fronts and doorways. On the upper floors are sash windows with impost bands, keystones, and hood moulds; on the first floor they have round heads, and above they have segmental heads.	II
8 Cable Street; 53.48550°N 2.23262°W		Mid to late 19th century	A former warehouse in brick with some stone dressings and coped gables. There are four storeys and sides of ten and three bays. The doorway and windows have segmental heads, and in the rear gable end are tiered loading doorways.	II
29 Swan Street; 53.48531°N 2.23427°W		c. 1865	A shop in red brick with blue brick banding, sandstone dressings, a carved foliated parapet, and a slate roof. There are three storeys, and four bays, the right three bays symmetrical. On the ground floor is a modern shop front. The left bay has an oriel window on the middle floor, above which is a gablet containing a window with a segmental-pointed head. The right bays contain a saw-tooth sill band, arcades of windows with polychrome heads, and has a hipped roof.	II
Former police and ambulance station 53.48648°N 2.23188°W		c. 1870	The building was badly damaged by fire in 2002, leaving only the boundary wall and the chimney. The wall has a sandstone plinth, and is partly in sandstone and partly in brick, with rusticated quoins on the corners. The chimney is in brick, it is tall and rectangular, and has panelled sides and a stone cornice on brackets.	II
10–20 Thomas Street; 53.48467°N 2.23783°W		c. 1870–1880	A former warehouse with an iron frame, clad in sandstone, and with dressings of polished granite, sill bands, panelled pilasters, and a bracketed eaves cornice with wrought iron cresting. It has a rectangular plan, on a corner site, and is in Venetian Gothic style. There are four storeys with an attic, a symmetrical front of nine bays, a four-bay extension on the left, four bays on the right return, and a bay on the corner. All the windows are sashes, on the first floor there is an arcade of round-headed windows, and on the second floor an arcade of segmental-headed windows, all with shafts and hood moulds. On the roof are round-headed dormers with moulded heads, on the corner bay is a spirelet, and above the extension is a gable.	II
Former Wholesale Fish Market; 53.48464°N 2.23722°W		1873	Of the original fish market, offices and shops, only the façade of the market remains, and the offices and shops have been altered. The façade is on High Street, it is in red brick with sandstone dressings, and consists of four wide coped gables, each containing three bays on a rusticated plinth, with sill bands, imposts, a Lombard frieze, and an apex finial. In the centre of each is a round-headed arch with a carved tympanum, and in the outer bays are round-headed doorways or windows. The shops and offices face Thomas Street, and have three storeys, nine bays and rounded corners. The ground floor is in stone and contains shop fronts and a central doorway with a pediment. The middle floor has an arcade of round-headed windows, on the top floor are sash windows, and on the top of the building are a frieze, a cornice, an upstand, and dormers.	II
Victoria Buildings; 53.48509°N 2.23966°W		1874	A warehouse and workshops, later used for other purposes, in red brick on a stone plinth, with sandstone dressings, a sill band, a bracketed eaves cornice, and a hipped slate roof. The building is in Italianate style, with a triangular plan and chamfered corners. There are five storeys and basements, and a front of 22 bays. On the ground floor are arcades of round-headed windows with imposts and keystones, doorways also with cornices, and segmental-headed wagon entrances. Most of the windows are sashes, and on the upper floors they have segmental heads.	II
75 and 77 High Street; 53.48447°N 2.23762°W		c. 1875	A warehouse, later a shop, with an iron frame, cladding in red brick and sandstone, and dressings in polished granite and red and yellow sandstone. It is in Venetian Gothic style, and has a trapezoid plan. There are four storeys, fronts of four and two bays and bays on the rounded corners. On the ground floor are panelled pilasters, a dentilled cornice, shop windows, and doorways with polished shafts and foliate capitals. The first floor contains arcades of round-headed windows, on the second floor the windows are round-headed with shafts, foliated caps, and banded voussoirs, and on the top floor the windows have segmental heads and hood moulds.	II
Cooperative Press; 53.48820°N 2.23536°W		Late 19th century	A printing works, altered in about 1905, and later used for other purposes. There are four storeys and basements. It is in two parts, the right part being the plainer, in brown brick with a corbel table and parapet. It has 12 bays divided by pilasters and windows with segmental heads, most of them sashes. The left part is in red brick with yellow terracotta dressings, and is in Edwardian Baroque style. At the top is an open pediment containing a lunette with terracotta voussoirs and a keystone. Most of the windows are sashes with moulded architraves and triple keystones, and on the top floor are two keyed oculi. In the left splayed corner is a square-headed doorway with an elaborate surround, including a corbelled semicircular canopy on corbels, containing an oculus in the tympanum.	II
Union Street Bridge; 53.48430°N 2.22493°W		Late 19th century	The bridge carries New Union Street over the Rochdale Canal, crossing the canal diagonally, and it is also a roving bridge for the canal towpath. It was rebuilt in 1903, and has been restored since. The bridge is in cast iron and brick, and has sandstone terminal piers, and cast-iron-panelled parapets. At the south end is a spiral ramp with brick sides and a cobbled deck.	II
Detached schoolroom block, Chetham's Hospital; 53.48622°N 2.24436°W	—	1878	The schoolroom block was designed by Alfred Waterhouse in Perpendicular style. It is in sandstone with buttresses, a sill band, moulded corbels and cornice, and a slate roof with coped gables and crocketed finials. There is a single storey, a rectangular plan, and a smaller parallel range to the northwest. The building has a doorway with a Tudor arched head and a moulded surround. The windows are transomed.	II
Ardwick and Ancoats Hospital; 53.48239°N 2.22077°W		1879–1891	Only the entrance block of the hospital remains. It is in red brick with polychrome bands and a hipped slate roof. There is a symmetrical front of seven bays, the middle three and the outer bays projecting. The middle bay contains a doorway with lettered arches, above which are two floors with two-light windows, and a turret with an oculus and oversailing parapet, and corner tourelles. All the windows are arched with polychrome heads, and some have shafts, and those on the top floor are gabled half-dormers.	II
Marble Arch Inn; 53.48827°N 2.23236°W		1888	The public house, designed by Darbyshire and Smith, is in polished pink granite on the ground floor, buff brick above, and has a hipped slate roof. There are two storeys, five bays on Gould Street, two on Rochdale Road, and a splayed bay on the corner. The ground floor is on a plinth, and has a frieze and a cornice, and at the top is a decorative terracotta eaves cornice. On the corner is a three-sided porch with granite columns, and there are two more arched doorways with hood moulds on Gould Street. In the centre of this front is a canopy and a gable with a dated panel.	II
Victoria Square; 53.48613°N 2.22899°W		1889	A block of municipal flats with four ranges around a square courtyard, with balconies on the internal walls. They are in red and stock brick with terracotta dressings and slate roofs. The front on Oldham Road is symmetrical with five storeys and attics, and 18 bays. Along the front are gables, some shaped, others pedimented, with ball finials. At the ends are pavilion roofs with lanterns. Most of the windows are sashes, and in the central two bays are four-storey canted oriel windows, and oculi in the gable. On the ground floor are modern shop fronts.	II
Charter Street Mission; 53.48960°N 2.23636°W		1892	Originally a ragged school, mission hall, and working girls' home, it was designed by Maxwell and Tuke, and extended in 1900. It is built in red brick with terracotta dressings and a slate roof, and has a trapezoidal plan around a central courtyard, infilled at ground level. It is mainly in three storeys, partly with an attic, the windows vary, and include canted oriel windows, there are two doorways with pediments, and gables, one of which is stepped.	II
Derros Building; 53.48429°N 2.23126°W		1899	Built as a women's refuge, it is in red brick with banding in buff terracotta, and a jettied gable with applied timber framing to the attic and a tiled roof. There are three storeys and attics, with one bay on the front, nine bays along the side, and a bay on the canted corner. On the front, and high on the corner, are canted oriel windows. Most of the other windows are mullioned and transomed, and on the roof are flat-headed dormers.	II
Cooperative Warehouse; 53.47995°N 2.22084°W		c. 1900	The warehouse, built for the Cooperative Wholesale Society, is in red brick with some sandstone dressings, and has a plain parapet with stone coping. There are three storeys and a basement, a front of 32 bays, including an office range of six bays, and six bays on the sides. The office range has a sill band, a moulded cornice, a round-headed doorway with a stone architrave, and pilasters on the upper floors. On the west front are two-storey canted oriel windows on stone corbels on the upper floors. The windows are sashes, in the office range they have square heads, and elsewhere segmental heads.	II
Former Corn and Produce Exchange; 53.48475°N 2.24310°W		1903	The former corn exchange, later converted for other uses, has an iron frame with sandstone cladding and a slate roof with a glazed atrium. It is in Baroque style, and has a large curved triangular plan, with four storeys, a basement and attic, and a front of 21 bays, and a domed cupola at the west corner. Between the bays are pilasters rising to form chimneys. On the ground floor are shops, and above are windows with round or square heads. The main doorway has an elliptical head, paired pilasters in polished pink granite with Ionic capitals, an entablature with a cornice, a keystone, and a lettered frieze. At the top of the building are shaped gables.	II
Cooperative Wholesale Society; 53.48640°N 2.24047°W		1905–1909	Offices and a warehouse for the Cooperative Wholesale Society, with a rear block of 1903, in red brick with dressings in polished granite and sandstone. It is in Baroque style, and has four storeys with a basement and a full attic storey, and a front of nine bays with canted corners. Between the bays are pilasters on the lower storeys, and by paired Corinthian columns in the attic. In the centre is a large round-headed doorway with a granite surround and a lettered frieze, and flanked by niches. In the basement the windows have segmental heads, on the ground and first floors are canted mullioned and transomed windows, and on the third and fourth floors are colonnades. The attic contains arcades with Doric columns. At the top of the building is a balustraded parapet, and the corners are surmounted by drums.	II
Parkers Hotel; 53.48828°N 2.23969°W		1906	Originally offices, later used for other purposes, the building has a slate roof. It is in two parts, the rear part plainer. The entrance part is on a corner, and in red brick and Portland stone, and is in Edwardian Baroque style. There are three storeys, a basement, a double attic, and nine bays curving round the corner, with a rusticated ground floor. The outer bays have banded pilasters and open pediments with cartouches. The central bays have giant pilasters, a dentilled and modillioned cornice, and a balustraded parapet. At the top is a mansard roof with flat-headed dormers, and an octagonal turret with a copper-clad dome. The central round-headed doorway has pilasters, a cartouche keystone with swags, and a segmental open pediment. The rear portion has four storeys and a basement, it is in sandstone, and has eight bays divided by piers, with cornices, sash windows, and a parapet with railings.	II
Little Mill; 53.48452°N 2.22607°W		1908	A cotton mill built to be run by electricity, it has an internal construction of cast iron, steel and concrete, and the walls are in brick. There are five storeys, fronts of ten and four bays, and two towers, one the entrance, privy, and stair tower, and the other to house the electric motors. The windows are wide with segmental heads, there is a cornice above the fourth floor, and panelled angle pilasters with a swept parapet between them on the entrance tower.	II
Ashton House; 53.48894°N 2.23833°W		1910	Built as a women's hotel, it is in red and common brick, and has dressings in buff and white terracotta and a slate roof. The building is in Arts and Crafts style, with a triangular plan on an island site. There are four storeys and a basement, a main front of 14 bays, and a single-storey apse at the south end. On the front is a three-bay pilastered entrance section, with a segmental-arched porch containing a square-headed doorway with a six-light fanlight, and at the top is a parapet with single-bay pediment. The outer bays contain paired sash windows. On the wall behind the apse is an embattled parapet with s central gable.	II
Holyoake House; 53.48652°N 2.23946°W		1911	Built as offices for the Cooperative Wholesale Society, the building is in faience, light blue in the basement and ground floor, and cream above. It has a rectangular plan on a corner site, with a chamfered corner, and is in Baroque style. There are three storeys, a basement and attic, four bays on Hanover Street and six on Redfern Street. Parts of it are rusticated and the upper floors contain giant fluted Ionic pilasters. There is a cornice over the ground floor and a frieze and modillioned cornice over the top floor. The entrance has a semicircular head, a scrolled keystone and voussoirs. The windows vary; most on the ground floor have round heads with triple keystones, some above have pedimented architraves, and others have moulded architraves and aprons.	II
Paragon Mill; 53.48389°N 2.22800°W		1912	A cotton spinning mill designed to use mains electricity, it has an internal structure of cast iron, steel and concrete, and is clad in red brick with dressings in terracotta and white stone, and has sill bands, a wide string course, pilasters above and below it, corner turrets with banded parapets. There are six storeys, a front of ten bays, and a single-storey extension. On the south side is a stair tower, and towers containing the electric motors. At the southeast corner is a tower with a broken pediment and a parapet.	II*
Royal Mill; 53.48325°N 2.22781°W		1912	A cotton spinning mill designed to use mains electricity, later used for other purposes. It has an internal structure of cast iron, steel and concrete, and is clad in red brick with dressings in terracotta and stone, and has corner pilasters. There are six storeys, fronts of ten and three bays, an external northwest stair tower with a dome, and towers containing the electric motors. On the front is a seven-storey entrance block containing a segmental archway, a privy tower, and a water tower. The windows have segmental arches.	II*
Former Midland Bank; 53.48503°N 2.23304°W		1922	The former bank is in Portland stone, it is in Classical style, and has an irregular plan with a semicircular end. There are two storeys, a rusticated ground floor, paired Ionic pilasters above, a panelled frieze, a dentilled modillioned cornice, and a balustraded parapet. The doorway has pilasters, a cornice on consoles, and a voluted keyblock. The windows on the ground floor have round heads and voussoirs, and on the upper floor they are square-headed with moulded architraves, ornamental balconies, and cornices on cartouches.	II
Unicorn Hotel; 53.4829°N 2.2370°W		1924	An "improved" public house in red brick laid in English garden wall bond with stone dressings, of three storeys and three bays. The ground floor has a central doorway flanked by wide windows, all under a fascia carried on brackets. The upper floors have sash windows with stone lintels and sills, and the building is finished with a moulded eaves cornice.	II
St Patrick's Church, Miles Platting; 53.49017°N 2.22616°W		1936	A Roman Catholic church in red brick with white stone dressings and a slate roof, and in Romanesque style. It consists of a nave with a clerestory, north and south aisles, an apsidal sanctuary, and a west tower enclosed by two-storey porches with doorways and parapets. On the west front of the tower is a giant arch with a portal containing a round-headed doorway with a mosaic in the tympanum. Above this are three round-headed lancet windows, and there are more lancet windows along the sides of the church.	II
Cooperative Society Building; 53.48626°N 2.23960°W		1937–1942	Offices for the Cooperative Wholesale Society in buff brick with a base of blue brick and stone dressings. There are seven storeys and a service tower to the left. The ground floor contains an entrance and windows with piers between. On the lower five floors is a continuous range of projecting casement windows with curved corners. Above the sixth floor is a decorative cornice band.	II
Daily Express Building; 53.48453°N 2.23161°W		1939	Newspaper offices and printing works, designed by Owen Williams, that has been enlarged on a number of occasions, the last between 1993 and 1995 when it was converted into offices. It has a steel frame with walls in translucent and black glass. There are six storeys, the top two storeys recessed, and a front of five bays. The left corner is curved and rises to a seven-storey tower with a cantilevered roof deck.	II*
