= Unicorn Hotel, Manchester =

Listed pub in England

Unicorn Hotel
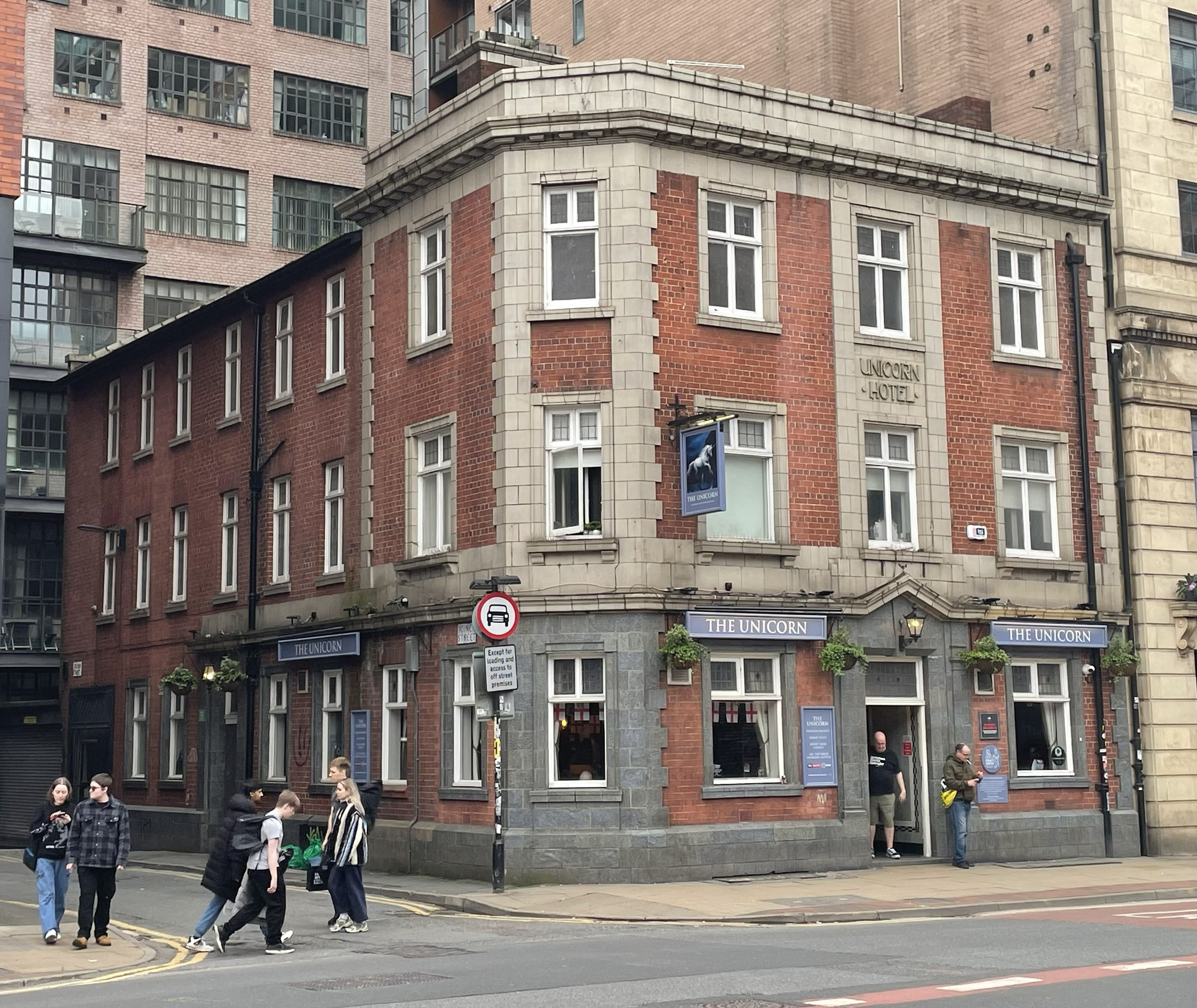
- The Unicorn in 2026
- Alternative names: The Unicorn

General information
- Type: Public house
- Architectural style: Neo-Georgian
- Location: 26 Church Street, Northern Quarter, Manchester, England
- Coordinates: 53.4829°N 2.2370°W
- Year built: 1924; 102 years ago

Design and construction
- Architect: William Ellerton
- Designations

Listed Building – Grade II
- Official name: Unicorn Hotel
- Designated: 28 June 2019
- Reference no.: 1464011

Website
- Official website

The Unicorn Hotel (now trading as The Unicorn) is a Grade II listed public house on Church Street in the Northern Quarter area of Manchester, England. Designed by William Ellerton and built in 1924 to replace an earlier pub on the site, it is a well‑preserved example of an inter‑war "improved" public house, retaining much of its original plan form and interior detail. The Campaign for Real Ale (CAMRA) rates the interior as being of "outstanding national historic importance".

== History ==
The Unicorn Hotel was designed by William Ellerton of the architectural practice Graves and Ellerton and built in 1924. It replaced an earlier building of the same name, which appears on the 1922 Ordnance Survey map and had occupied the site for many decades.

The building is a comparatively rare Manchester example of an inter‑war "improved" public house, retaining the plan form and interior detail characteristic of the type. Improved pubs were designed to be larger and more comfortable than earlier houses, often including dining rooms, function spaces and gardens, and aimed at attracting a broader range of customers. The Campaign for Real Ale (CAMRA) has included the Unicorn on its National Inventory of Historic Pub Interiors, noting that much of its 1920s layout and fittings survive. CAMRA regards it as one of Manchester's best‑preserved examples and of "outstanding national historic importance".

On 28 June 2019, the pub was designated a Grade II listed building. It is currently run by Craft Union, a division of the Stonegate Pub Company.

== Architecture ==
=== Exterior ===
The building is constructed of brick in English garden-wall bond with faience detailing, slate roofs and timber windows. Its north-facing front has three bays with an angled bay to the left and follows a simple neo-Georgian layout. The elevation is symmetrical, with faience at ground level and brickwork above, finished with a parapet. Openings are set in plain surrounds, and the timber windows include mullions, transoms and leaded glazing in varying patterns.

The centre bay is faced entirely in faience and includes the main doorway, framed by pilasters and a square surround, with timber double doors and a leaded overlight. The angled corner bay repeats the treatment of the main front.

Along Joiner Street the range continues for seven bays in brick and faience. Openings follow the pattern of the front, with some altered at ground level, including a former doorway and a wagon entrance now closed by railings. Upper floors have timber mullion-and-transom windows with leaded glazing. The roofline shows exposed eaves with gutters, and the plinth runs the full length. Modern lights and signage are fixed to the elevation.

To the rear, the lower level is mostly hidden, with a single first‑floor window visible. The inner faces around the yard have simple timber windows, many with leaded panes.

=== Interior ===
The cellar retains early service features, including the lift to the bar, a dumbwaiter, the former wash area, blocked steps, and the barrel and coal drops. Two further dumbwaiters survive in the servery.

On the ground floor, decorative tiling remains in the porch and on the former passage wall, and the Church Street lobby retains inter‑war tiling. The plan is largely intact, with original panelling, fixed seating, joinery and the servery with patterned leaded glazing. Much of the seating and panelling appears to date from the 1920s. The former smoke room retains bell pushes and faience fireplaces, and the gents' doorway has an elaborate surround. A patterned leaded skylight above the smoke room is thought to be original. The screened island bar with leaded panels also survives.

A small snug at the rear retains original seating with some later panelling. Two further snugs retain panelling, fixed seating, bell pushes, ceramic fireplaces and a stained and leaded skylight, possibly later in date.

The staircase and balustrade survive throughout. The first‑floor landing is wainscoted, with surviving doors, architraves, picture rails, coving and at least one fireplace. The dining room is a well‑preserved 1920s interior with panelling, plasterwork, light fittings, serving hatch, dumbwaiter and glazed doors. Early secondary glazing survives to some front windows, along with original signage.

The second floor retains wainscoting, glazed service doors, larder shelving and a probable copper stand. Bedroom and bathroom doors, four fireplaces, built‑in wardrobes, picture rails and coving all survive. Only two exterior windows from 1924 remain.

== See also ==
- Listed buildings in Manchester-M4
- Listed pubs in Greater Manchester
