= Hare and Hounds, St Albans =

St. Albans, Hertfordshire, AL1

Coordinates: 51°44′52″N 0°20′12″W

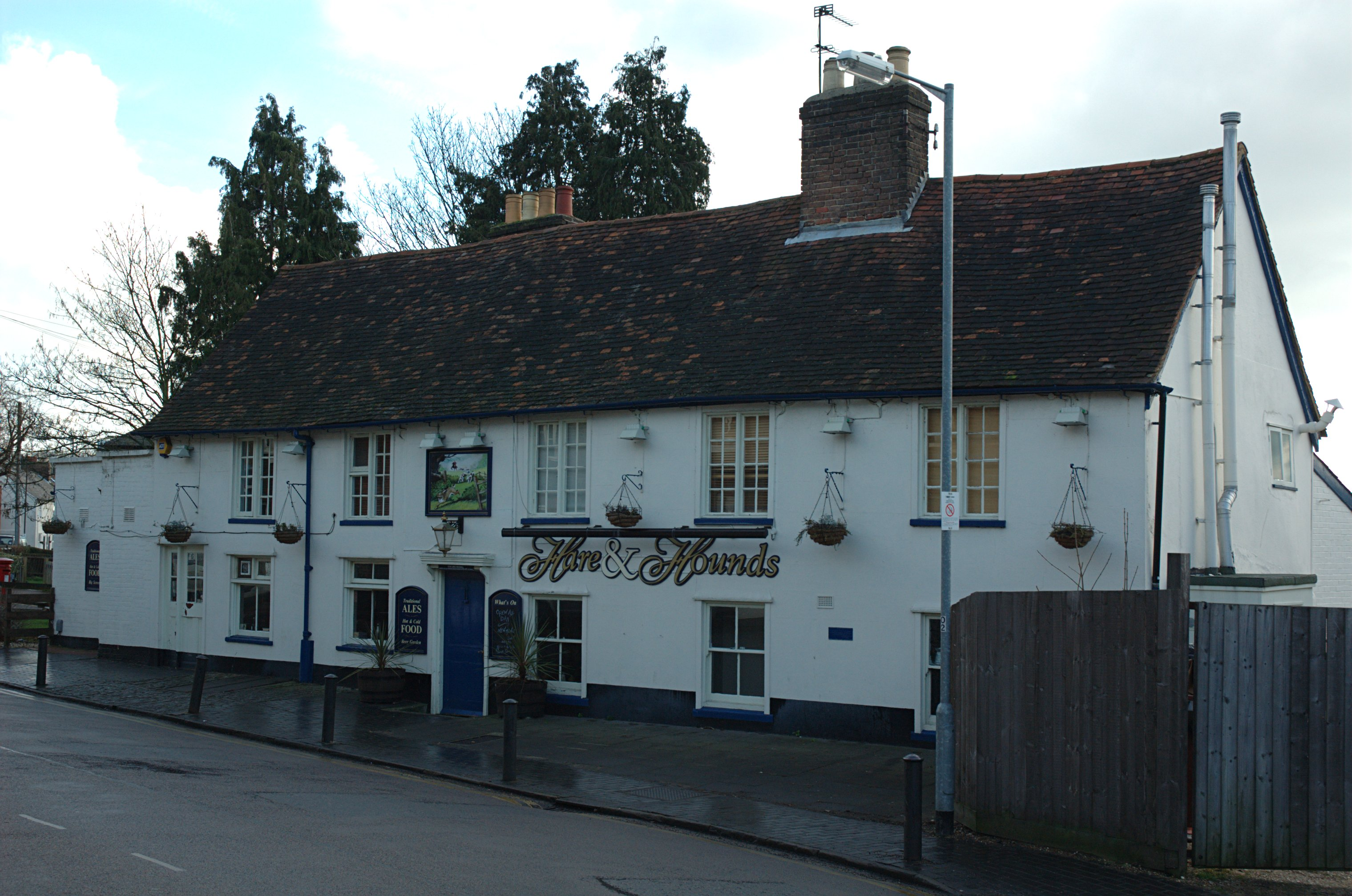
The Hare and Hounds

The Hare and Hounds is a public house at 104 Sopwell Lane in St Albans, Hertfordshire, England. The timber framed building has a plastered exterior. It is listed Grade II with Historic England and is dated "seventeenth century or earlier".
