= Marble Arch Inn =

Listed pub in Manchester, England

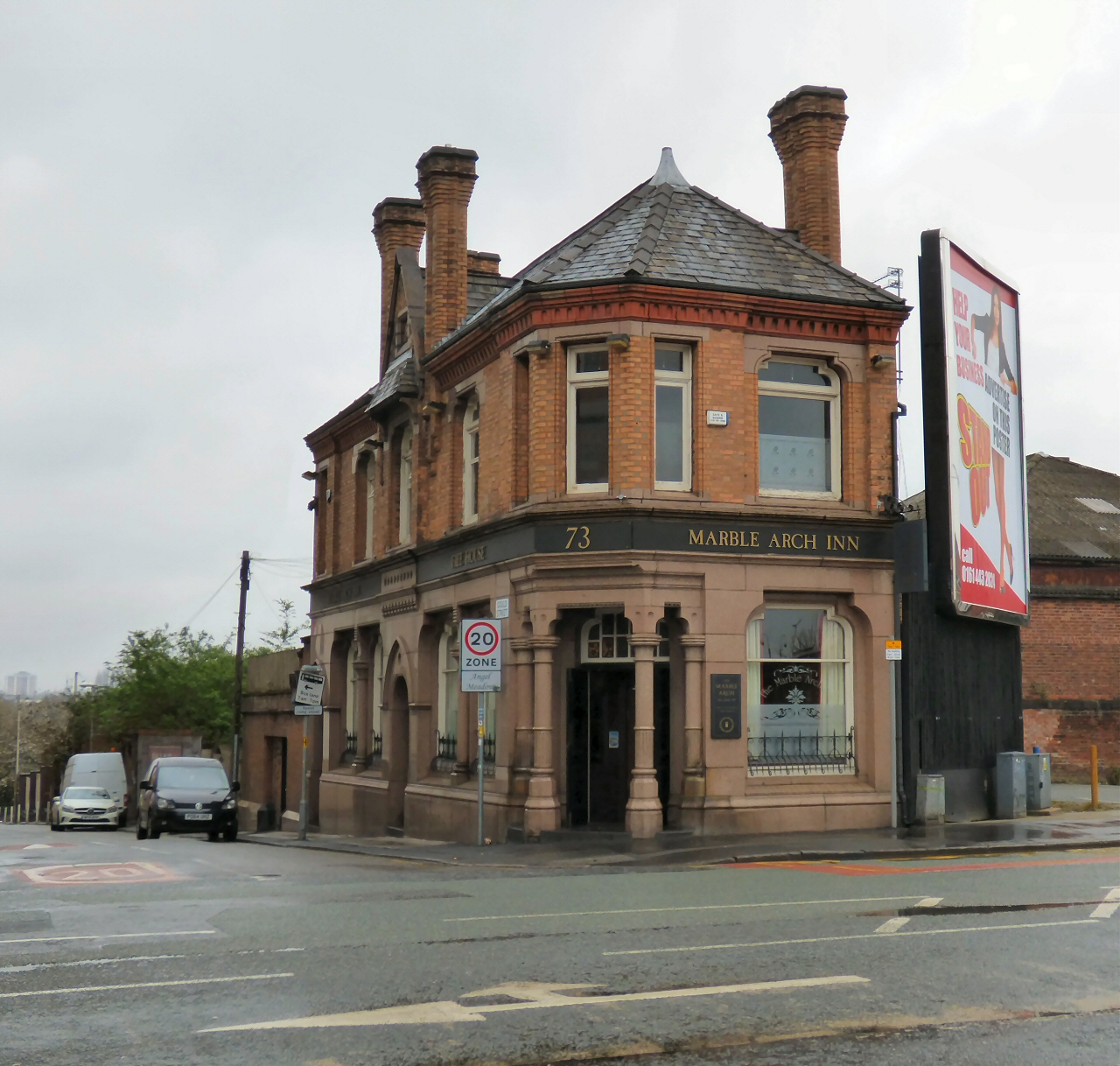
- The pub in 2017

General information
- Type: Public house
- Location: 73 Rochdale Road, Collyhurst, Manchester, England
- Coordinates: 53.4883°N 2.2319°W
- Year built: 1888; 138 years ago
- Client: McKenna's Brewery
- Owner: Marble Brewery

Technical details
- Material: Buff brick, polished pink granite
- Floor count: 2

Design and construction
- Architects: Darbyshire & Smith
- Designations

Listed Building – Grade II
- Official name: Marble Arch Inn
- Designated: 20 June 1988
- Reference no.: 1247604

Website
- Official website

The Marble Arch Inn is a Grade II listed public house on Rochdale Road in the Collyhurst area of Manchester, England. Designed by Darbyshire & Smith and built in 1888 on the site of an earlier McKenna's Brewery show‑house, it retains a richly detailed Victorian interior recognised by the Campaign for Real Ale (CAMRA) as being of "outstanding national historic importance". The pub was the original base of Marble Brewery, founded at the rear of the building in 1997, and continues to serve as the brewery's flagship venue.

== History ==
The pub was built in 1888 by the architects Darbyshire & Smith. It stands on the site of an earlier pub that functioned as a show-house for McKenna's Brewery in the mid-19th century.

On 20 June 1988, the Marble Arch Inn was designated a Grade II listed building. It is regarded by the Campaign for Real Ale (CAMRA) as having an interior of "outstanding national historic importance" and is rated three stars on its National Inventory of Historic Pub Interiors.

Marble Brewery, originally founded at the back of the building in 1997, now conducts its brewing operations in Salford. The pub remains as the brewery's flagship venue.

In October 2026, plans by the McGoff Group for a 17-storey residential building on adjoining land were refused by Manchester City Council. The proposal attracted objections from Marble Brewery, CAMRA and local residents, while councillors expressed concerns about the effect of the development on the setting of the Grade II-listed pub.

== Architecture ==
=== Exterior ===
The building is constructed of buff brick, with polished pink granite used at street level, and has a hipped slate roof. It stands on a corner and has two floors, with five bays facing Gould Street, an angled corner bay, and two bays along Rochdale Road.

The ground floor sits on a shaped base and has a decorative band and ledge running around the building. The corner entrance is set back within a small three‑sided porch supported by granite columns, with arches of the type often called "Caernarvon" above. There are two more entrances on the Gould Street side, both with round‑arched heads and moulded surrounds. The windows on this level also use the same arch shape; those on Gould Street are paired and divided by small central shafts.

The upper floor repeats the same window shape. The central window on the Gould Street front is sheltered by a small sloping canopy and sits beneath a gable containing a terracotta panel dated 1888, flanked by two tall chimneys with cornices. The corner has three flat‑headed windows. A richly detailed red‑terracotta cornice runs around the eaves.

=== Interior ===
The internal walls are lined with glazed bricks. Above, there is a decorative frieze displaying various alcoholic and cordial beverages. The ceiling is adorned with more glazed bricks forming low jack arches on iron girders, with ceramic brackets at the ends. The floor is covered in mosaic tiles, primarily in cream and blue with floral insets, and slopes noticeably downhill from the Rochdale Road end.

== See also ==
- Listed buildings in Manchester-M4
- Listed pubs in Greater Manchester
