= Hare and Hounds, Manchester =

Listed pub in England

Hare and Hounds
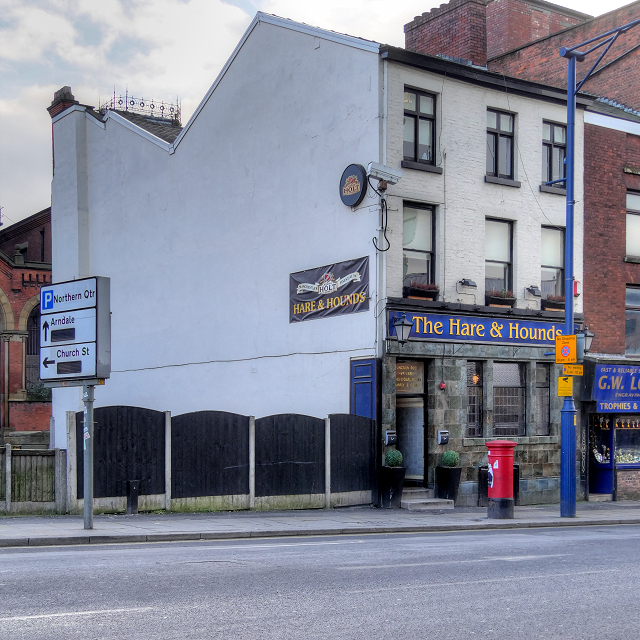
- The pub in 2016

General information
- Type: Public house
- Location: 46 Shudehill, Manchester, England
- Coordinates: 53.4851°N 2.2379°W
- Year built: c. 1800; 226 years ago
- Renovated: Late 19th century (altered) c. 1925 (remodelled)

Design and construction
- Designations

Listed Building – Grade II
- Official name: Hare and Hounds
- Designated: 10 December 1999
- Reference no.: 1379936

Other information
- Public transit: Shudehill Interchange

The Hare and Hounds is a Grade II listed public house on Shudehill in Manchester, England. Built around 1800, it is one of the city centre's oldest surviving pubs and is rated by the Campaign for Real Ale with three stars for having an interior of "outstanding national historic importance".

== History ==
The building dates from around 1800, when the Shudehill area was developing as a commercial district on the edge of Manchester's expanding town centre. It was altered in the late 19th century and received a comprehensive interior refit around 1925, much of which still survives, including the plan form and fitted interior.

On 10 December 1999, the Hare and Hounds was designated a Grade II listed building. The pub is regarded by the Campaign for Real Ale (CAMRA) as having an interior of "outstanding national historic importance" and is rated three stars on its National Inventory of Historic Pub Interiors. It continues to operate as a city‑centre pub opposite Shudehill Interchange.

== Architecture ==
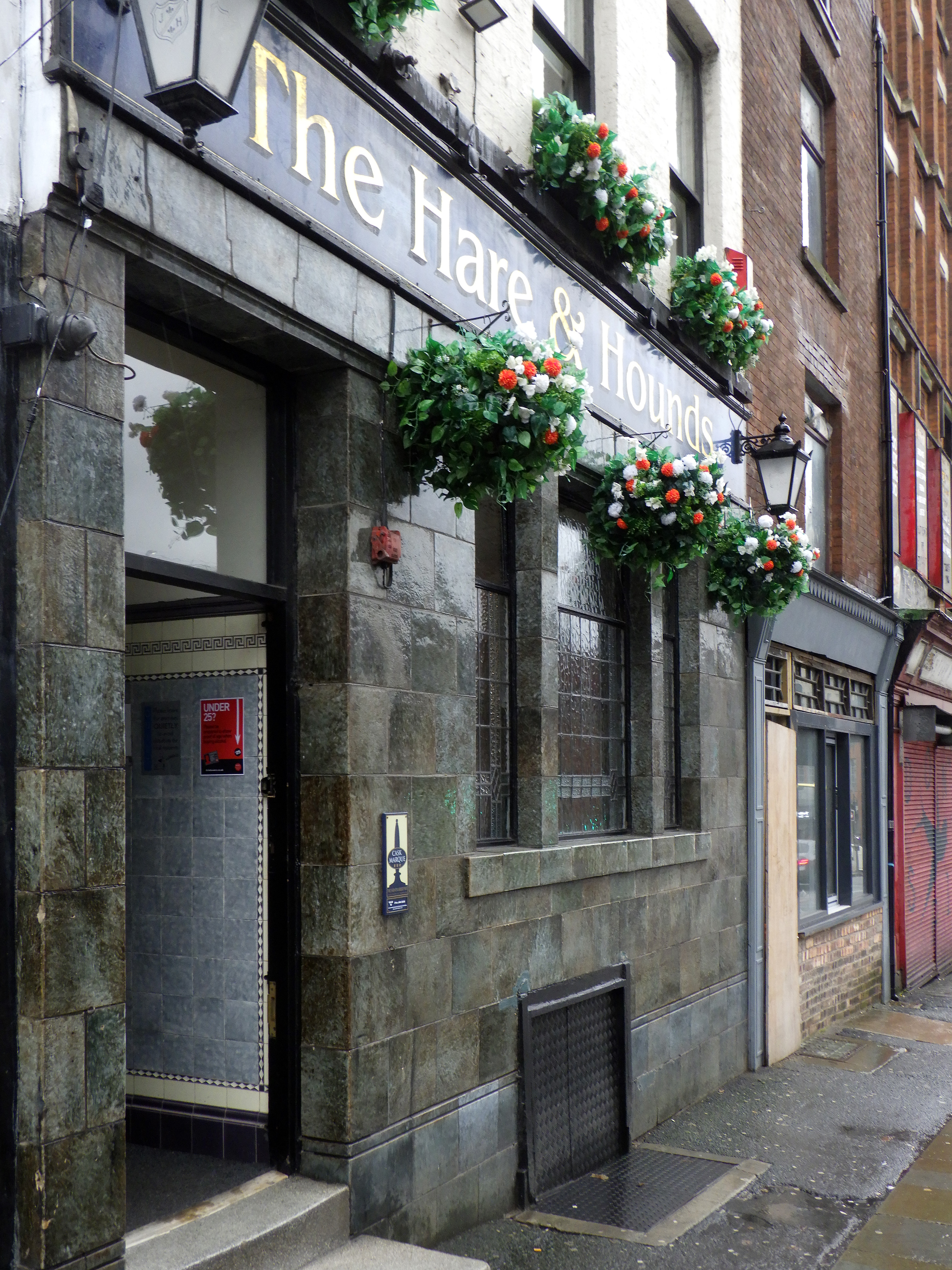
The pub's blue-brown tiled front façade in 2025

=== Exterior ===
The building has painted brick walls, with the lower front section finished in glazed tiles. Its roof is covered in Welsh slate and has a chimney set at one end. It follows a simple layout with one main structural bay and rooms arranged front to back.

The front faces the street with three storeys, while the rear drops to four because of the ground level. The ground floor at the front is finished in blue‑brown tiles. The entrance is positioned to the left and fitted with a 20th‑century panelled door. To the right is a three‑part window with tiled vertical divisions and patterned glass added during later alterations.

On the first floor, there are three single‑pane sash windows. The top floor has three windows, each divided into two panes with a horizontal bar. The back of the building includes a mixture of sash and casement windows.

=== Interior ===
The two bars and an open central drinking area are reached from a corridor that runs the full length of the building on the left side. Small internal lobbies with grey‑green and cream tiles serve the front and rear entrances. The corridor itself is tiled halfway up in dark brown.

The front bar, finished in the same tiling, adjoins the central drinking space. The main counter faces this central area, with short returns to the front and rear rooms. It has simple panelling and a glazed upper section designed to echo sash windows, fitted with decorative glass from the 1920s. Both bars and the cellar have panelled doors with glazed upper sections and rectangular lights above. The front entrance lobby contains half‑glazed double doors with a wide light above. Fixed seating is provided in both bars, and the rear bar retains its period fireplace surround and bell pushes.

Toward the back of the corridor is a staircase with slender balusters and a panelled partition beneath.

The pub, with early 19th‑century origins and extensively updated around 1925, still keeps the layout and almost all the interior fittings from that refurbishment, including counters, back fittings, glazed structures, and joinery.

== See also ==
- Listed buildings in Manchester-M4
- Listed pubs in Greater Manchester
