= Manchester Carriage and Tramways Company L53 =

Manchester Carriage and Tramways Company L53 is the only surviving complete Eades horse tram. It was built in 1877 for the Manchester Carriage and Tramways Company.

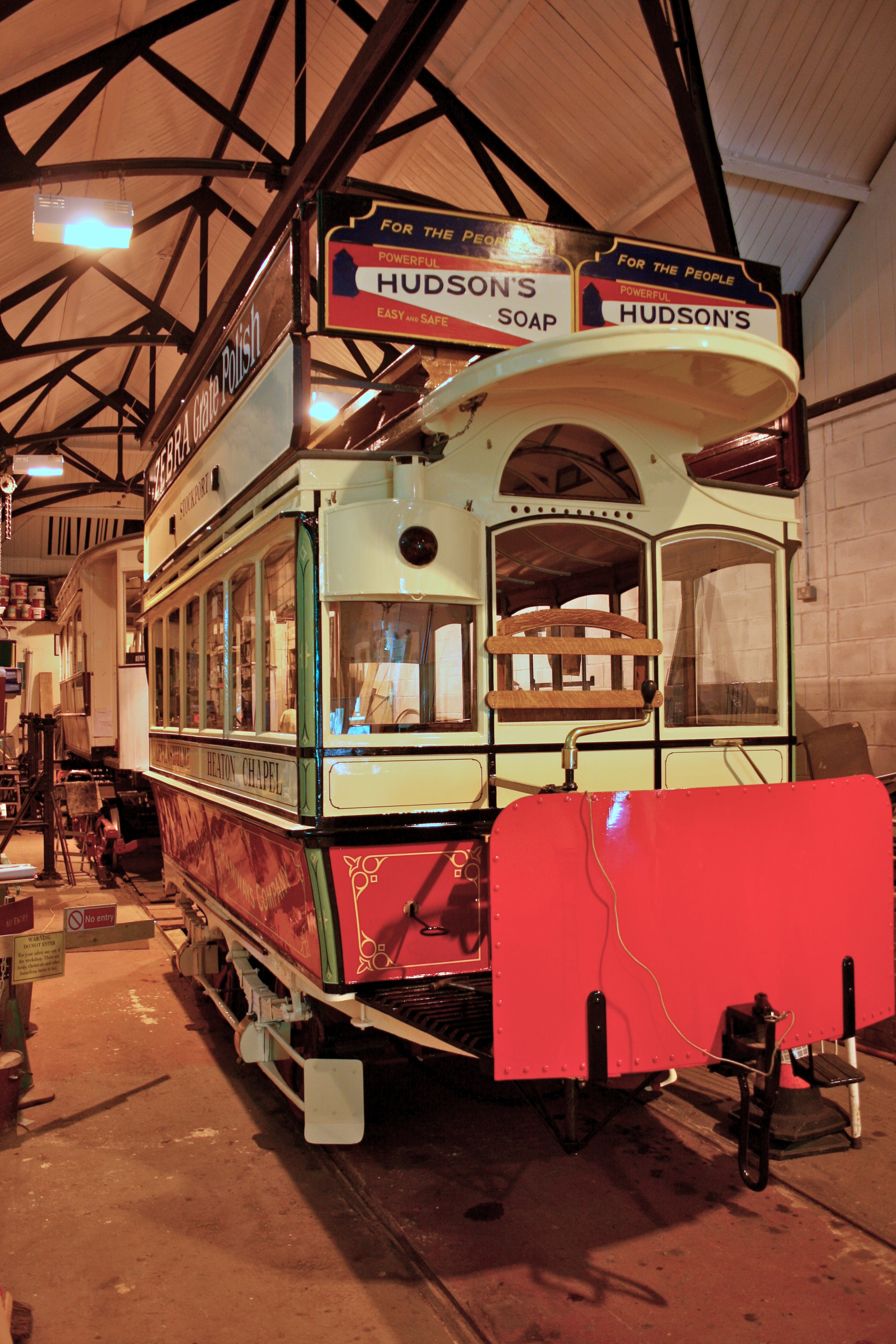
L53 in Heaton Park

== Design ==
It is one of over 500 designed by John Eades in 1877 and operated in and around the Manchester area until 1903. Built by the company to the Eades patent Reversible type, the tram is unique among all surviving trams in that it uses the horses' own power to turn the body of the tram round on its underframe when reaching the end of the tracks. Prior to this invention most horse trams were double-ended. On reaching a terminus the horse needed to be uncoupled and taken to the other end. Eades' design saved time. Also only one staircase was needed thus increasing the capacity and reducing the weight.

== Restoration ==
Rescued from a retirement near Glossop Derbyshire, that included use as a hairdresser's and a fish and chip shop, the tram was restored over a 25-year period by a team of skilled volunteers which included most of the side frames being made by one of the team as part of an 'A' Level woodwork exam.

== Operation ==
L53 is one of the main trams operated by the Heaton Park Tramway, and is often loaned out to other museums. In 2009 it was loaned to Beamish Museum, and in May 2010 to Bury Transport Museum.

== Other sources ==
- Heaton Park Tramway
- Eades reversible tram
- YouTube video of the Eades Reversible Tramway Car being turned
