= Stockport Corporation Tramways =

Former tramway service operator from England

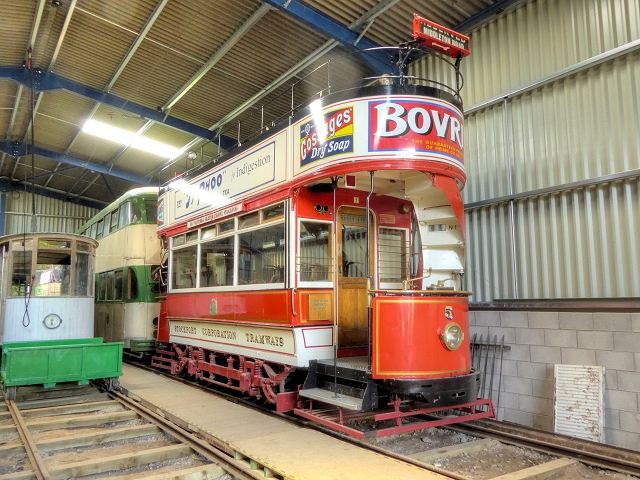
- Stockport tram No.5, dating from 1901, is preserved at the Heaton Park Tramway.

Operation
- Locale: Stockport
- Open: 26 August 1901
- Close: 25 August 1951
- Status: Closed

Infrastructure
- Track gauge: 4 ft 8 1/2 in (1,435 mm)
- Propulsion systems: Electric and horse

Statistics
- Route length: 19.46 miles (31.32 km)

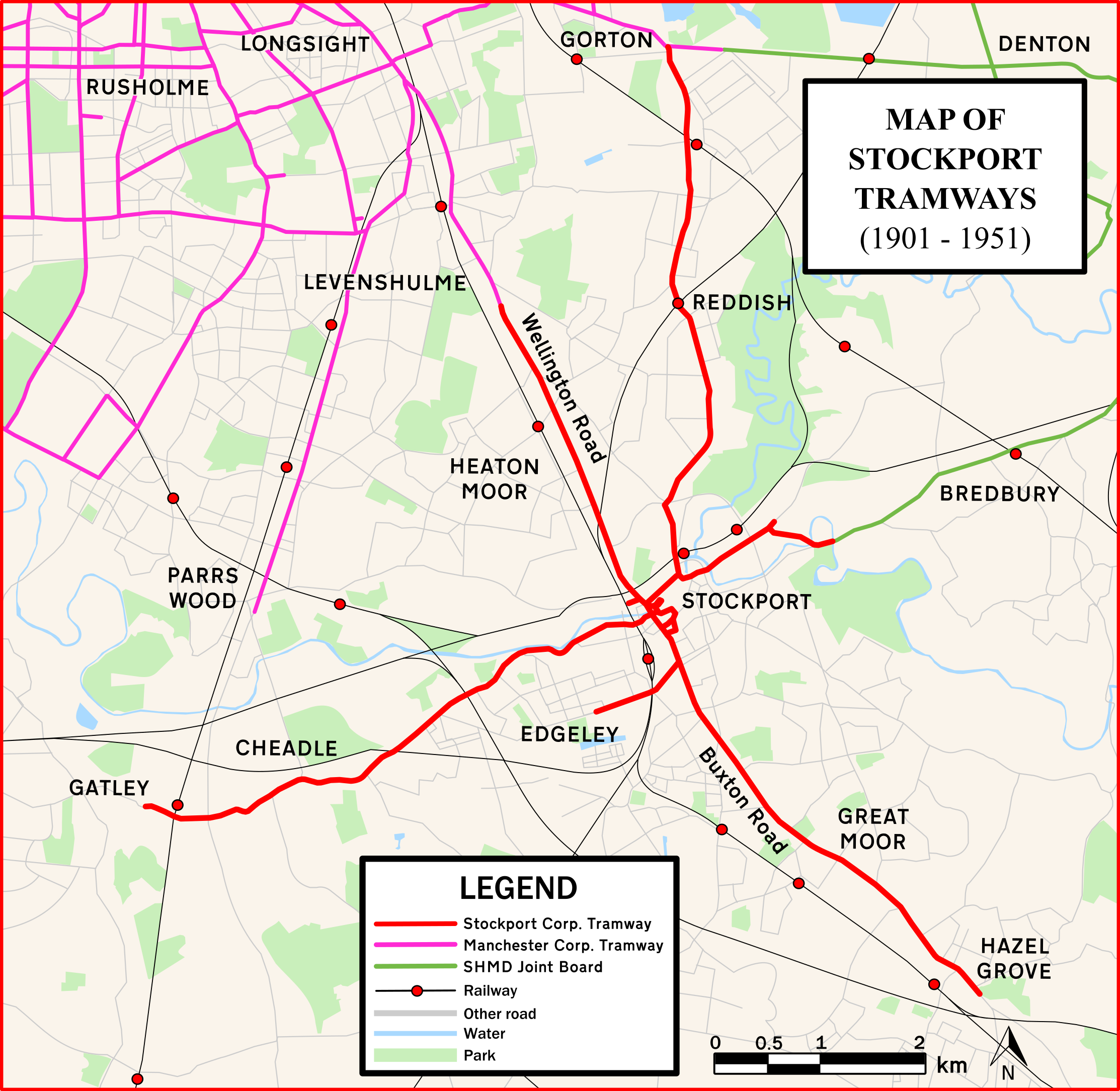
System map

Stockport Corporation Tramways operated a tramway service in Stockport, England, between 1901 and 1951. It was preceded by a horse tramway from Levenshulme to Stockport, which opened in 1880, and was ultimately run by the Manchester Carriage and Tramways Company. A second independent horse tramway opened in 1890, running to Hazel Grove. In 1899 the corporation bought the first line, electrified it, and leased it back to the operating company. Their powers to buy the Stockport and Hazel Grove Tramway, obtained in 1899, were not exercised until 1905.

A second act of Parliament, the Stockport Corporation Tramways Act 1900 (63 & 64 Vict. c. lxvii), allowed them to build and operate their own lines, and a network developed fairly quickly. The system was connected to two neighbouring systems, with through running onto the Oldham, Ashton and Hyde Tramway from 1 January 1903, and onto the Manchester Corporation Tramways network from 1908. The fleet of tramcars steadily increased, with the corporation owning a total of 87 double-deck electric tramcars through the life of the system. A small section of the network was closed in 1931, but the rest survived the Second World War, and was progressively closed in 1950 and 1951.

The corporation also ran a small trolleybus line, using three vehicles which collected current from the overhead lines using the German Lloyd-Kohler system, the only use of this system in Britain. The route opened in 1913, but the onset of the First World War made obtaining spare parts from Germany impossible, and it ran intermittently, due to maintenance problems. It was replaced by motor buses in 1920.

Through running allowed long journeys to be made by tram, with the route from Hazel Grove to Seaforth Sands near Liverpool being 51.5 miles (82.9 km). One lady is known to have travelled between Liverpool and Stockport for pleasure on several occasions, although it took almost a whole day to reach her destination. At least one tram was sold off after withdrawal, and the lower saloon of tramcar number 5 was recovered from a field, where it had been used as a hen house, in 1971. It has been restored by the Stockport 5 Tramway Trust, and now runs on the Heaton Park Tramway, a tramway museum in Heaton Park, Manchester.

== History ==
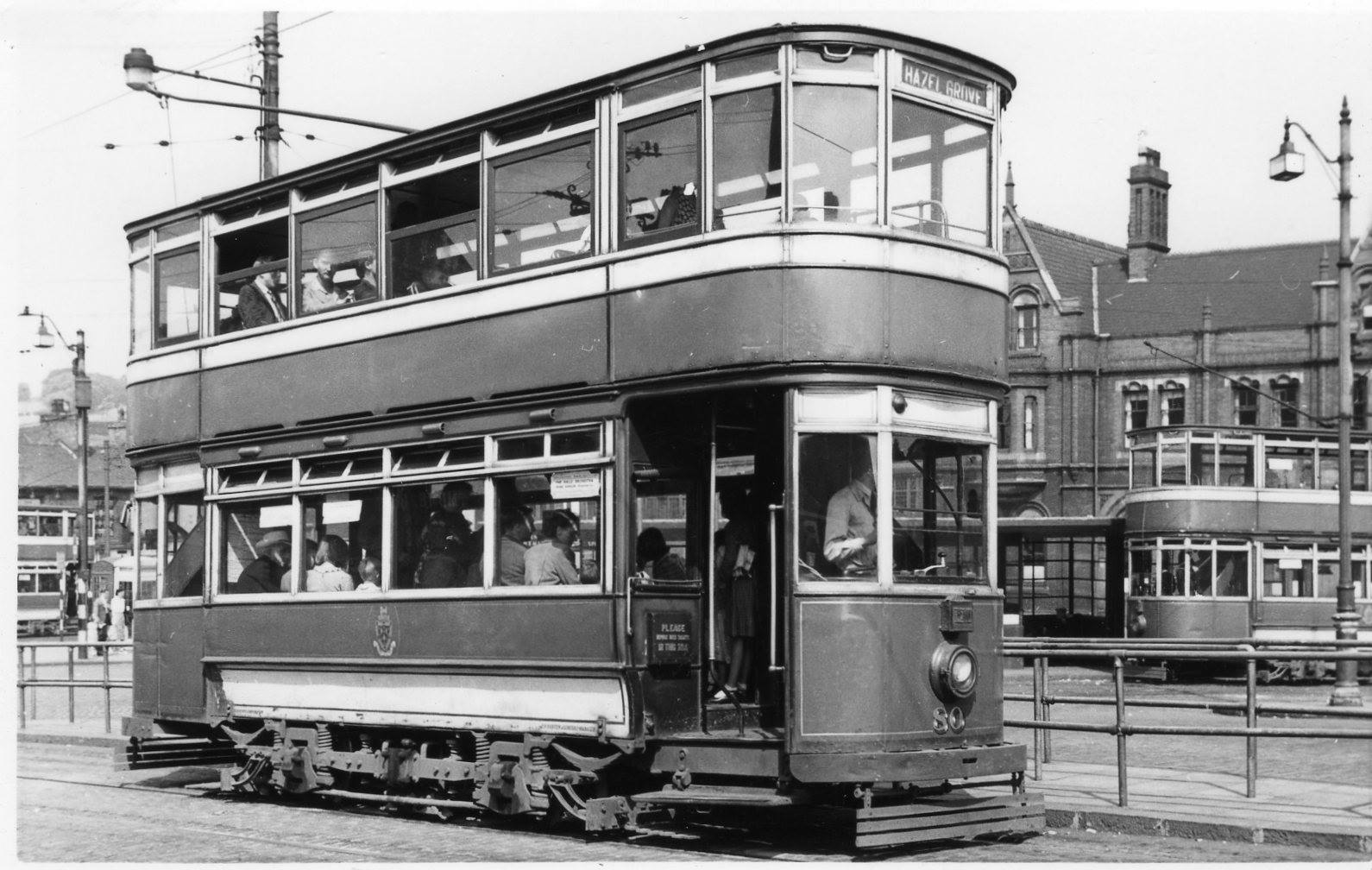
Stockport Corporation 80 to Hazel Grove in the 1940s

The first public tramway service in Stockport opened on 7 May 1880. It ran from a northern terminus in Levenshulme, southwards along Stockport Road and Wellington Road North, to a southern terminus by the George Hotel on Mersey Square, close to the River Mersey. It was a double track standard gauge 4 ft 8 1/2 in (1,435 mm) line, with horse-drawn trams, and was about 2.25 miles (3.62 km) long. It was promoted by the Manchester Suburban Tramways Company, which had been created by the Manchester Suburban Tramways Act 1878 (41 & 42 Vict. c. cxli), to build a series of lines which served areas beyond those served by the Manchester Carriage Company, who operated lines on behalf of the corporations of Manchester and Salford. In 1880, the two companies merged, to become the Manchester Carriage and Tramways Company. In the following year, an extension from Mersey Square along St Petersgate to St Peters Square opened. Around 60 double deck horse trams were stabled at Longsight Depot, at the junction of Stockport Road and Grey Street, some of which were used on the Stockport line.

A second independent line opened on 4 April 1890. It had been authorised by the Stockport and Hazel Grove Tramways Order 1889, and the main line was about 3 miles (4.8 km) long. This ran from the terminus of the first line at St Peters Square, and followed the course of Wellington Road South, Buxton Road and London Road to reach the Bulls Head Hotel on Torkington Road in Hazel Grove. A short branch ran from Wellington Road South along Grenville Street, Edgeley. This was also a standard gauge horse tramway, used single track throughout, and was run by the Stockport and Hazel Grove Carriange and Tramway Company. Details of operation are rather scarce, but there was a depot at Dialstone Lane, and it is thought that there were probably four single deck and 16 double deck trams.

Stockport Corporation obtained two acts of Parliament. The first, the Stockport Corporation Act 1899 (62 & 63 Vict. c. cxcvi), allowed them to buy the line operated by the Manchester Carriage and Tramways Company, to convert it to an electric tramway, and then to lease it back to the company, who would operate it on their behalf. It also allowed them to buy the Stockport and Hazel Grove Tramways line, although the option to do so was not actioned until 1905. The second act, the Stockport Corporation Tramways Act 1900 (63 & 64 Vict. c. lxvii), allowed them to build and operate their own tramways, which they did, opening the first in 1901. This ran from a southern terminus at Lancashire Bridge, close to St Peters Square, and headed north-eastwards, running along Warren Street, Great Portland Street, Carrington Road, Stockport Road West (now the B6104), and Stockport Road East (now the A560), to terminate at Ashton Street, Woodley. A short branch from Lancashire Bridge, running up Lancashire Hill to Sandy Lane followed on 31 August 1901, and a new depot for the corporation trams was constructed in Mersey Square. A batch of ten open top double deck trams were ordered from Dick, Kerr & Co. of Preston, and had all been delivered by the end of the year.

Expansion of the system occurred fairly quickly. Mersey Square was linked to Lancashire Bridge via Prince's Street on 1 June 1902, and in December, Mersey Square was linked to St Peter's Square via Daw Bank. A route along Chestergate and Brinksway to the town border opened in January 1903, which was subsequently extended to Cheadle Heath on 1 August 1903, to Cheadle Church on 26 January 1904, and to the Horse and Farrier public house at Gatley on 25 March 1904. The line to Sandy Lane was extended in stages along Reddish Road, through Reddish and along Gorton Road to terminate at the Old Bull's Head Inn. The first instance of through running occurred on 1 January 1903, when the Woodley line, which had been extended to the boundary with Hyde on 18 July 1902, was joined up with the Oldham, Ashton and Hyde Tramway to enable Stockport trams to reach Hyde Town Hall.

The option to buy the Stockport and Hazel Grove Tramway was taken up on 24 January 1905, with the corporation paying £24,000 for the horse-drawn system. It was closed between April and 5 July, while it was upgraded for electric operation. The horse trams were sold, but some were bought back two years later, to be used as salt cars. The final extension to the tramway network occurred on 2 October 1906 when an extension from Torkington Road to the Rising Sun Hotel opened. In 1908, through running with the Manchester Corporation Tramways system began when their Hyde Road route was connected to the line at the Old Bull's Head Inn. To keep pace with the extensions more trams were purchased. A further batch of 20 trams were supplied by Dick, Kerr in 1902–03. In 1906 five top covered double deck vehicles were bought from United Electric Car Company of Preston, with another five bought in 1907. Their popularity with passengers led to the corporation fitting top covers to a number of their existing open top trams soon afterwards.

After the end of the First World War, the corporation fitted new bodies to five of the older tramcars in 1919, which were then renumbered 61 to 65. The following year, a batch of ten enclosed double deck trams were purchased from English Electric of Preston. That year also saw the end of a seven-year experiment with trolleybuses, and the introduction of motor buses by the corporation, but their effect on the tramway network was not immediate, as ten new trams were bought from Cravens Railway Carriage and Wagon Company of Sheffield in 1923, and a follow-on order for another ten was placed in 1924. The final additions to the fleet were two enclosed cars, built by the corporation in 1928–29, and numbered 6 and 26. A new depot at Heaton Lane was aopened at about this time, located just to the north of the Mersey. Because the Stockport system was linked to the Manchester system, and that was linked to a number of others, it was in theory possible to travel by tram from Hazel Grove to the south of Stockport all the way to Seaforth Sands, to the north of Liverpool, a distance of some 51.5 miles (82.9 km). Such a journey would require a number of changes of tram, because there were no through journeys over this distance, and would require some endurance, as the journey by regular trams would take most of a day. However, Modern Transport magazine carried a letter in its 4 April 1936 edition, stating that the writer's aunt had made the journey from Liverpool to Stockport for the pleasure of doing so on several occasions. The through route also enabled Liverpool Corporation Tramways to lend an illuminated tramcar to Stockport to publicise a municipal event.

The first part of the system to be closed was the part of the Gatley line which was outside the town boundary, where services were discontinued on 19 September 1931. However, the rest of the system survived the Second World War, but was closed progressively in 1950 and 1951. The Crossley Road to Hazel Grove route was the first to go, on 14 January 1950, followed by the Edgeley to Vernon Park route on 3 March 1951, the Cheadle route on 10 April 1951 and finally the Reddish line on 25 August 1951.

=== Trolleybuses ===
Stockport took an early interest in trolleybuses or trackless cars, as they were known initially, for the Tramway Manager was sent to Bradford and Leeds in 1911, to inspect the newly opened systems in those towns. He then visited Bremen in Germany, where the Lloyd-Kohler system was under trial. This used two parallel wires, mounted one above the other, with a small trolley that ran along them, and a flexible connection to the vehicle. When vehicles travelling in opposite directions met, they stopped and exchanged trolleys before continuing with the trolley from the other vehicle. The corporation elected to go with this system, and applied to Parliament for powers to build a line from St Peter's Square to borough boundary at Offerton Road, a distance of 1.75 miles (2.82 km). They hoped to extend the route to Marple, but this required agreement with the local authorities through which the trolleybuses would pass, and despite lengthy discussions, Hazel Grove and Marple urban district councils would not agree to the proposals.

Three trolleybuses were obtained from Brush Electrical Engineering Company. They had a single deck, seats for 22 passengers, a rear entrance, and were powered by a 35 hp (26 kW) electric motor. The technical press of the day made much of the fact that the speed change control system was operated by pedals, leaving the driver's hands free to steer the trolleybus. The vehicles were the first and only ones in Britain to use the Lloyd-Kohler method of current collection, which was not without its problems. The trolley that ran between the two wires, known locally as a 'monkey', was prone to dewire and drop onto the roadway, causing disruption to the service as well as being a hazard to pedestrians.

There were also problems with reliability, which were exacerbated by the onset of the First World War, making the purchase of spare parts from Germany impossible. There was a particular problem with the failure of the back axles of the vehicles, and at times the service was suspended because no trolleybuses were serviceable. One of the vehicles was sold for further use to the Mexborough and Swinton Traction Company in 1916, and in 1919 motor buses replaced the trolleybuses when both were awaiting spare parts. Subsequently, the trolleybuses only ran sporadically, and their use was abandoned on 11 September 1920.

=== Preservation ===
Some of the trams were sold after they were withdrawn from service, and tram number 5, one of the original batch of ten vehicles supplied by Dick, Kerr & Company in 1901, which was withdrawn in 1948, was one such vehicle. The lower saloon was in use as a hen house, when it was discovered in 1971. It was recovered from a field between Glossop and Hayfield by 236 Squadron Royal Corps of Transport, and restoration by the Stockport 5 Tramway Trust began. They obtained a 4-wheeled truck from the Porto Tramways Company in Portugal, and reconstructed the end balconies and the upper deck. Once restoration was completed in 1996, it went to Blackpool Tramway, where it was used intermittently. It visited Doncaster in 2002, as part of their celebrations of 100 years of public transport, was used intensively in Blackpool in 2003, and then was used infrequently.

Heaton Park Tramway is a tramway museum opened in 1980 using an original stretch of tramway track which once carried special workings, particularly Sunday School parties, into the grounds of Heaton Park in Manchester, and Stockport number 5 was moved there in 2011. Further work was carried out over the winter of 2012, including the application of period adverts to the upper deck panelling, and it re-entered service in March 2013.

== Fleet ==
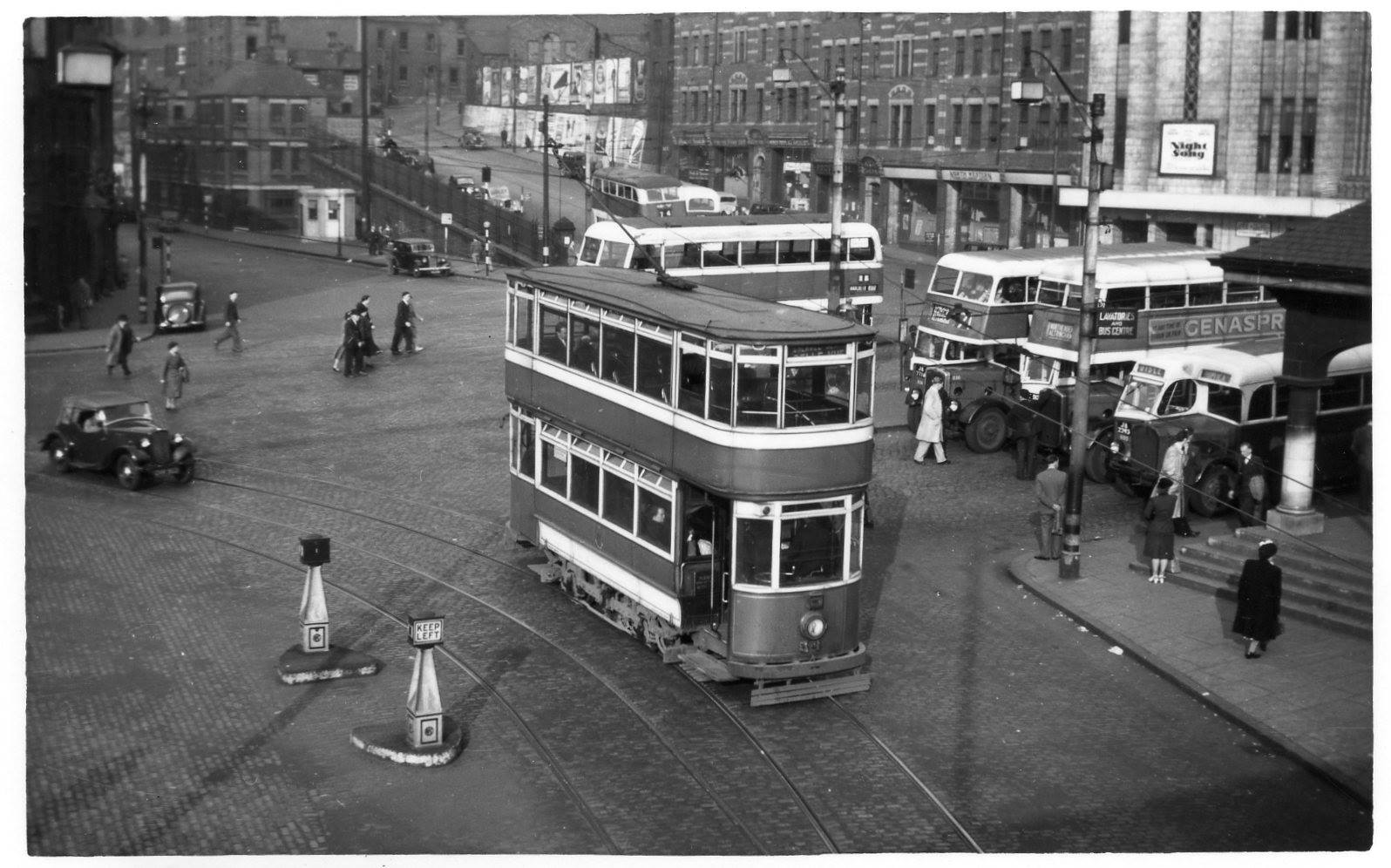
Stockport Corporation 83 leaves Mersey Square

Stockport Corporation Tramways owned a total of four single deck and 16 double deck horse trams, inherited from the Stockport & Hazel Grove Tramway. Although sold off soon after acquisition, at least some of them were bought back after two years to become salt cars. They also owned a total of 87 electric tramcars, all double deck.

Electric trams

Car numbers	Type	Year built	Builder	Notes
1-10	double deck open top	1901	Dick, Kerr	No. 5 preserved at Heaton Park Tramway
11-30	double deck open top	1902-3	Dick, Kerr	
31-40	unknown			No details found
41-45	double deck top covered	1906	United Electric	
46-50	double deck top covered	1907	United Electric	
51-60	double deck enclosed	1920	English Electric	
61-65		1919	Stockport Corporation	5 older cars rebodied and renumbered
66-75	double deck enclosed	1923	Cravens	
76-85	double deck enclosed	1924	Cravens	
6, 26	double deck enclosed	1928-9	Stockport Corporation	

Trolleybuses

The Corporation owned three trolleybuses, using the Lloyd-Kohler system of current collection. One of the vehicles was sold to Mexborough and Swinton Traction Company in 1916, where it was converted to use trolley poles and carried the number 24. It is quoted as having 22 seats while running at Stockport, but 28 at Mexborough and Swinton.

Car numbers	Type	In service	Withdrawn	Chassis	Electrical equipment	Bodywork
1-3	single deck 2-axle	1913	1920	Daimler Brush	Brush, with 35 hp (26 kW) motor	Brush B22R

Bus bodywork designations: key
Prefixes

U	Wartime utility bodywork
B	Bus body single deck
C	Coach body single deck
D	Dual purpose single deck
H	Highbridge body, central upper gangway
L	Lowbridge body, offset sunken upper gangway

Numbers

n	Single deck or total seating
x / y	Upper deck followed by lower deck seating

Suffixes

C	Centre entrance
F	Front entrance
R	Rear entrance
D	Dual entrance

== See also ==
- Stockport power station

== Bibliography ==
- Joyce, J; King, J S; Newman, G (1986). British Trolleybus Systems. Ian Allan. ISBN 978-0-7110-1647-7.
- Klapper, Charles (1974). The Golden Age of Tramways (2nd ed.). David & Charles. ISBN 978-0-7153-6458-1.
- Turner, Keith (1996). The Directory of British Tramways. Patrick Stephens. ISBN 978-1-85260-549-0.
