= Manchester Transport Museum =

Manchester Transport Museum may refer to:

- The Greater Manchester Museum of Transport, a transport museum in the Cheetham Hill area of Manchester, UK.
- The Manchester Transport Museum Society, operators of a museum tramway in Heaton Park, Manchester, UK.
