= Trams in Manchester =

Trams in Manchester may refer to:

- Manchester Corporation Tramways (1901–1949)
- Manchester Metrolink (1992–)
