= Heaton Park Tramway =

Heritage tramway in Manchester, England

Coordinates: 53.5322°N 2.2495°W

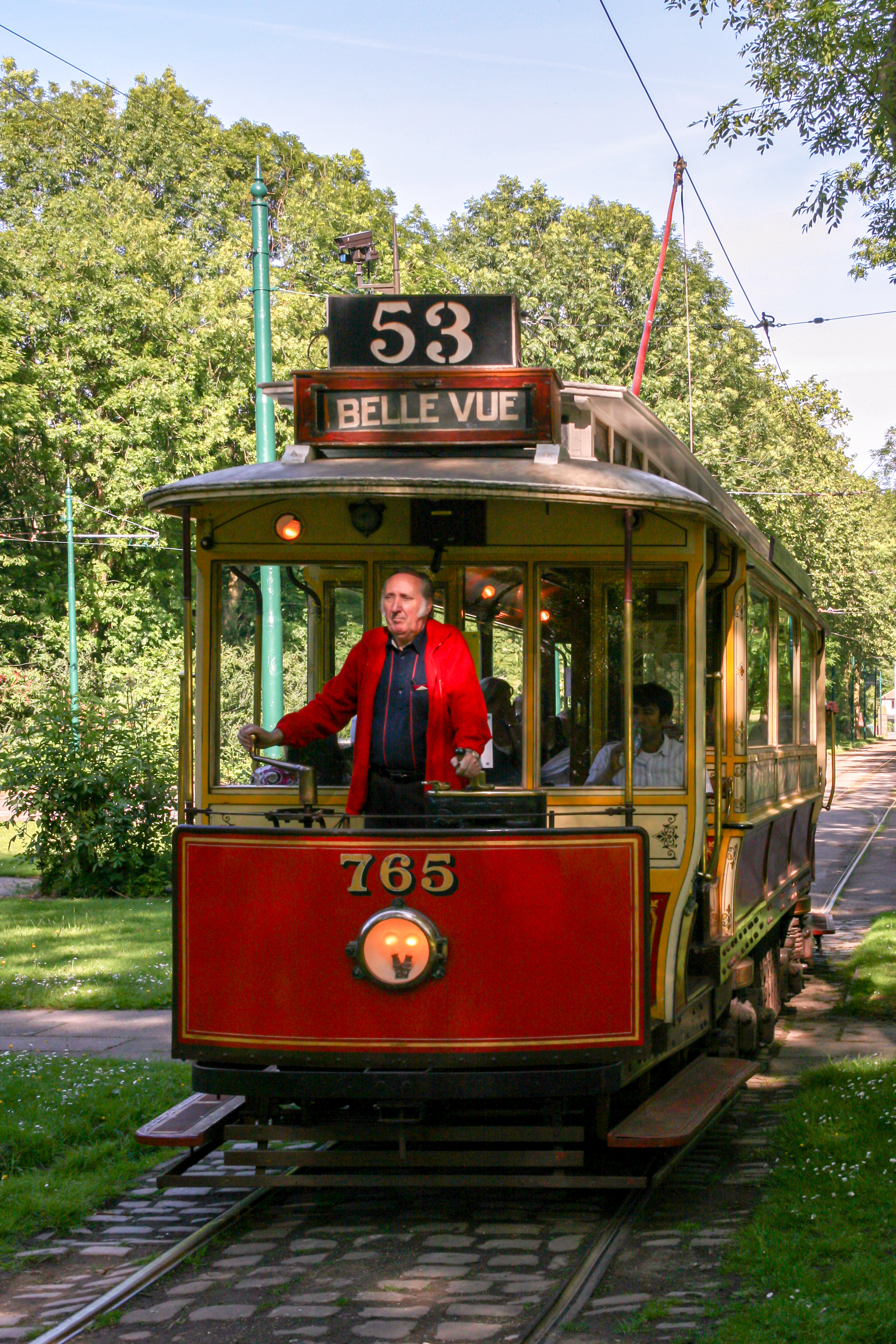
- Tram number 765 in Heaton Park

Operation
- Locale: Heaton Park, Manchester
- Status: Open
- Operator: Manchester Transport Museum Society

Infrastructure
- Track gauge: 1,435 mm (4 ft 8 1/2 in) standard gauge

Statistics
- Route length: 0.52 miles (0.84 km)

The Heaton Park Tramway is a heritage tramway that operates within Heaton Park, a large municipal park in the English city of Manchester. It is operated by the Manchester Transport Museum Society, a registered charity.

In normal times, the tramway operates on Sunday afternoons between March and mid-November and on Saturday afternoons between May and mid-September. Operation may be suspended whilst major events are being held in the park, and was temporarily suspended due to the COVID-19 pandemic although the tramway has now reopened.

== History ==
Heaton Park was originally the private landscape park surrounding Heaton Hall, but was sold to Manchester City Council in 1902 for use as a municipal park. Shortly after the park was bought by the council, a branch of Manchester Corporation Tramways was built 280 yards (260 m) into the park from the existing tramway on Middleton Road. A large waiting shelter was constructed at the end of this branch, and the first tram arrived on 31 May 1903. By 1934 buses were taking over from trams and the stub tramway into the park was disconnected from the main system and covered in tarmac for use by buses.

The Manchester Transport Museum Society (MTMS) was founded as a registered charity in the early 1960s, with the aim of the preservation of documents and artifacts relating to public transport in the Manchester region. An early project of the society was the restoration of Manchester Corporation Tramways 765, with aspirations to operate the car in Manchester, and identified Heaton Park as a possible site.

In the 1970s the society approached the city council with this idea. The initial plan, to construct a tramway from Grand Lodge to Heaton Hall, was considered too expensive, as it would require remedial works to carry it across the railway tunnel. A new scheme was proposed to open up the old Manchester Corporation Tramways spur from Middleton Road to the old tram shelter. The original track was buried under a layer of tarmac which was cleared and the tram shelter restored and modified to form a depot and museum. Work was completed in 1979 and the Heaton Park Tramway was officially opened on 28 March 1980.

Since 1980, the museum tramway has been extended further into the park on three occasions, using track salvaged from elsewhere, and is now 0.52 miles long. The most recent extension was in 2011 and reaches the boathouse and lake. A new tram depot has been constructed at this terminus. Additionally, major restoration of the original depot and museum complex was completed in 2007.

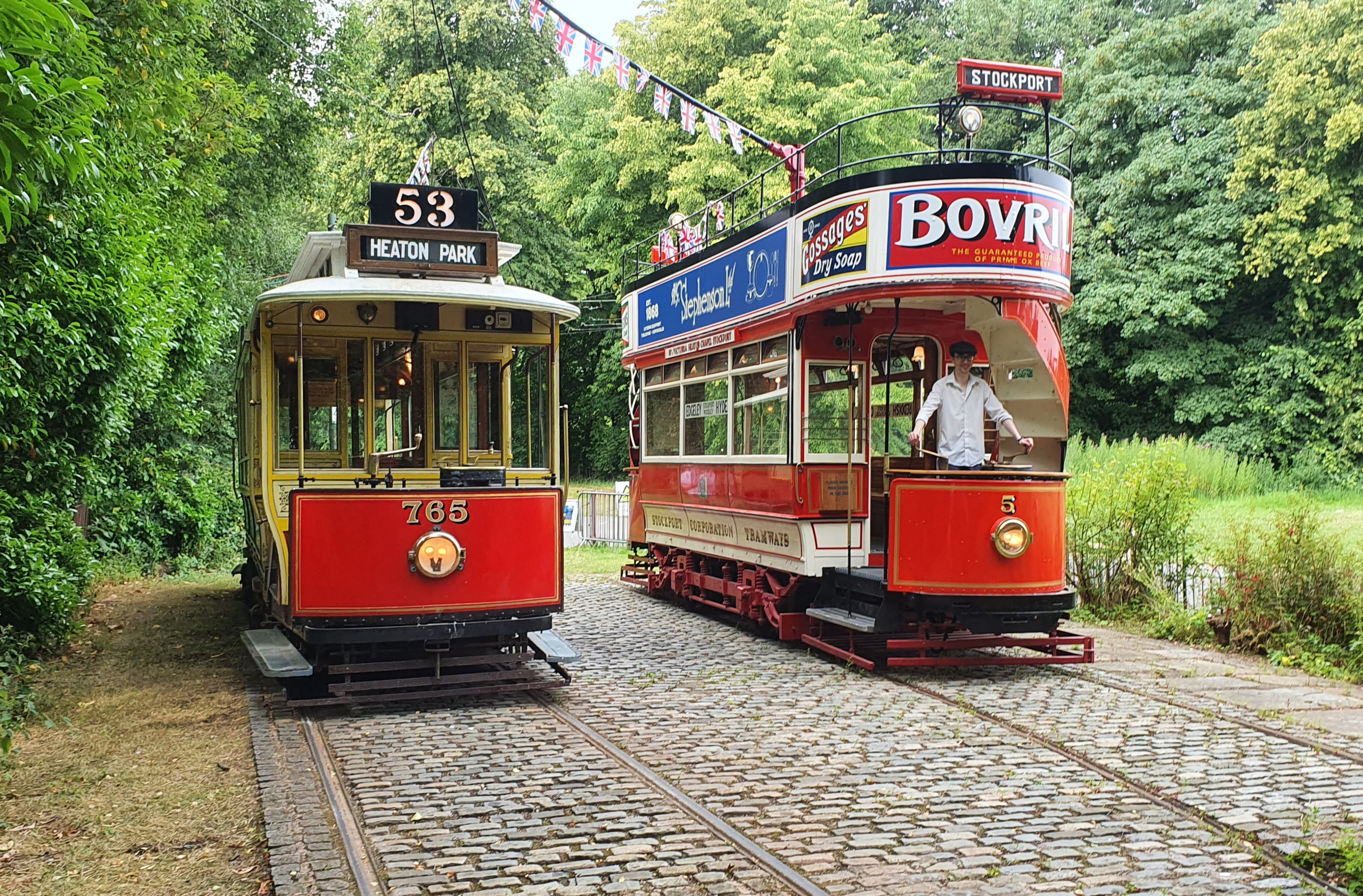
Heaton Park Tramway, Manchester 765 & Stockport 5

== Tramcars ==
=== Permanent collection ===
The following trams form the permanent collection of the Heaton Park Tramway:

Images	Original System	Car Number	Status	Year built	Notes
	City of Hull Tramways	96	Operational	1901	Built as an open top double deck car for Hull Corporation by Hurst Nelson in 1901, this car was totally enclosed about 1930 and cut down to a single deck works car in 1933. After the closure of the Hull tramways it was sold to Leeds Corporation Tramways, where it was used as a store car with the number 6 until the closure of that system in 1959. It was preserved in the Leeds area until it was brought to Manchester and restored as a single-deck passenger car. It has operated at Heaton Park since 1988. Media related to City of Hull Tramways No. 96 at Wikimedia Commons
	Blackpool Tramway	623	Operational	1937	This car was built in Loughborough by the Brush Electrical Engineering Company, entered service with Blackpool Corporation as number 286 in July 1937. It has had several modifications over the years, being renumbered 623 when the full fleet was renumbered in 1968. The car last operated in Blackpool in 2009, and the following year was placed on display at the Museum of Museums at the Trafford Centre. It was transferred to Heaton Park in 2011 and has operated there since 2012. Media related to Blackpool Tramway Brush Railcoach car 623 at Wikimedia Commons
	Manchester Corporation Tramways	765	Operational	1914	This car was built in 1914 and is the only remaining electric tramcar from Manchester in regular operation. It was one of a series of unusual single-deck bogie cars of the combination car type, with a central saloon and open smoking compartments at the ends, built for routes with low bridges. The conversion of these routes to buses in 1930 led to most of these cars being sold, and the body of 765 was acquired by a farm near Huddersfield. In 1960 it passed to a group that was to become the Manchester Tramway Museum Society and restoration work started. It has operated at Heaton Park since 1979. Media related to Manchester Corporation Tramways No. 765 at Wikimedia Commons
	Stockport Corporation Tramways	5	Operational	1901	This car was built as a 4-wheel open topper, in 1901 and later given a top cover, the car was withdrawn in 1948 and used as a hen house. The lower saloon was later rediscovered and acquired for preservation. The car was fully restored in 1996, and after use on the Blackpool Tramway and display in Doncaster, moved to Heaton Park in 2011, operating until 2013. Stockport 5 underwent major 7 year restoration and was re launched in December 2020. Media related to Stockport Corporation No. 5 at Wikimedia Commons
	Blackpool Tramway	619	Operational	1987 (1935)	This car is a replica of a Blackpool and Fleetwood Vanguard tram built in 1987. It was built using Blackpool Railcoach 282, built in 1935 and renumbered 619 in 1968. It operated in Blackpool until 2008, and came to Heaton Park in 2010. It operated until 2017 when it was withdrawn for overhaul, Returning to service in December 2022. Media related to Blackpool Tramway Replica Vanguard car 619 at Wikimedia Commons
	Rawtenstall Corporation Tramways	23	In storage	1912	This car is a single deck 4-wheeled tram built in 1912 for Rawtenstall, where it operated until withdrawal in 1932. The truck and roof were transferred from storage off site to Heaton Park in 2010, and the tram is currently in 'kit form' awaiting restoration.
	Oldham Corporation Tramways	43	In storage	1902	This car was originally built in 1902 on a Brill 21E truck as an open topped double-decker. In 1933, it was converted into a single deck car in order to operate the Oldham to Middleton route. Acquired by the Manchester Transport Museum Society after more than 60 years in open storage, it is in poor condition but considered suitable for restoration.
	Manchester Corporation Tramways	173	Under Restoration	1901	This 4-wheel open-top double deck tram was built by Brush in 1901. Later rebuilt with a top cover, it remained in service until 1931, and was used as a garden shed after withdrawal. Restoration took place at several locations, latterly at the Greater Manchester Museum of Transport, before the tram moved to Heaton Park in December 2013. The tram uses the truck from an Oporto coal tram that was imported for the purpose. Restoration to operational condition commenced in 2024. Media related to Manchester Corporation Tramways No. 173 at Wikimedia Commons
	Blackpool Tramway	702	In storage	1934	One of Blackpool Corporation's Balloon double-deckers, this car entered service as number 239 in 1934. Initially configured as an open top car, was converted to a totally enclosed car in 1942, and renumbered 702 in 1968. It last saw service in Blackpool in 2009, and in 2010 it was placed on display at the Museum of Museums at the Trafford Centre. It moved to Heaton Park in 2014. Media related to Blackpool Tramway Balloon car 702 at Wikimedia Commons
	Blackpool Tramway	752	In storage	1928	This car was purpose built as a railgrinder in Blackpool's Rigby Road workshops around 1928, and was originally numbered 1. After being briefly renumbered 2 in 1968, it became 752 in 1972. It was acquired by the MTMS in 2008. The intention is to paint it back into its original red livery, and renumber it back to 1. Media related to Blackpool 752 at Wikimedia Commons
	Manchester Metrolink	1007	In storage	1991	This car is one of the first generation Firema T-68 cars built for Manchester Metrolink in 1991 and was the first Metrolink tram to operate through the City centre on 27 April 1992. It was withdrawn from service on 26 May 2014, when it operated a farewell tour for the T-68 class. The car is currently in store at Metrolink's Trafford Depot, but will transfer to Heaton Park in due course.
	Manchester Carriage and Tramways Company	53	On loan to Bury Transport Museum	1877	This car is the last survivor from over 500 cars designed by John Eades in 1877 and operated in and around the Manchester area until 1903. Built by the company to the Eades patent Reversible type, the design is unique in that it uses the horses' own power to turn the body of the tram round on its underframe when reaching the end of the tracks. This avoids the necessity of unhitching the horse from one end of the tram and hitching it to the other, thus saving time. With only one staircase needed, it also increased the capacity and reducing the weight of the car. The remains of L53 were discovered in 1970 near Glossop in Derbyshire, and it arrived at Heaton Park in June 1998. Restoration was completed in 2008, and the car has been on display at the Bury Transport Museum since 2010. Media related to Manchester Carriage and Tramways Company No. 53 at Wikimedia Commons
	Blackpool Tramway	680	On loan to Blackpool Tramway	1935	This car entered service with Blackpool Corporation as number 280 in 1935. It was converted to a towing car in 1961 and renumbered 680. It last ran as a twin car in 1972, was withdrawn for overhaul in 1989, and returned to service in 1992. It was loaned to Beamish Museum in 2013, and arrived at Heaton Park in March 2015, where it initially ran using its original 280 number. In August 2015, it was renumbered 680 again, and returned on loan to Blackpool Tramway. Media related to Blackpool Tramway Brush Railcoach car 680 at Wikimedia Commons

=== Former Fleet ===
Original System	Car Number	Status	Year built	Notes
Blackpool Tramway	708	Ownership transferred to Blackpool Transport in 2023	1934	One of Blackpool Corporation's Balloon double-deckers, this car entered service as number 245 in 1934. Initially configured as an open top car, was converted to a totally enclosed car in 1941, and renumbered 708 in 1968. It last saw passenger service in Blackpool in 2004, and left the town in 2011. In 2013 it moved to NESLAM for display, remaining there until September 2016 when it returned to Blackpool for further storage. Ownership was changed to Blackpool Transport during 2023 in return for spare parts to service the tramways Blackpool fleet.

=== Other visitors ===
Trams that have visited the line include:

- Blackpool & Fleetwood No. 40 single-decker built in 1914.
- Blackpool No. 225 Boat open-decker built in 1934.
- Oporto No. 196 single-decker built in 1935.
- Marton Box No. 31 open-topper built in 1901. (The first Double Decker to run at the park since 1925).
- Blackpool No. 706 Balloon open-topper built in 1934.

== Projects ==
Overhauls to Stockport 5 are now complete, Vanguard 619 is now the main focus of priority for the tramway. A funding appeal will soon start for extension of the Lakeside depot in order to provide space for the T68 being preserved to move to the tramway. Future projects include the restoration of Manchester Corporation Tramways open top tram 173 built in 1901, Blackpool Balloon 702, Oldham 43 built in 1902 and the Blackpool railgrinder No. 752. Plans exist for a further extension of the tramway towards Heaton Park Metrolink stop.
