= Manchester Corporation Tramways 765 =

Last remaining car from the original Manchester tramways

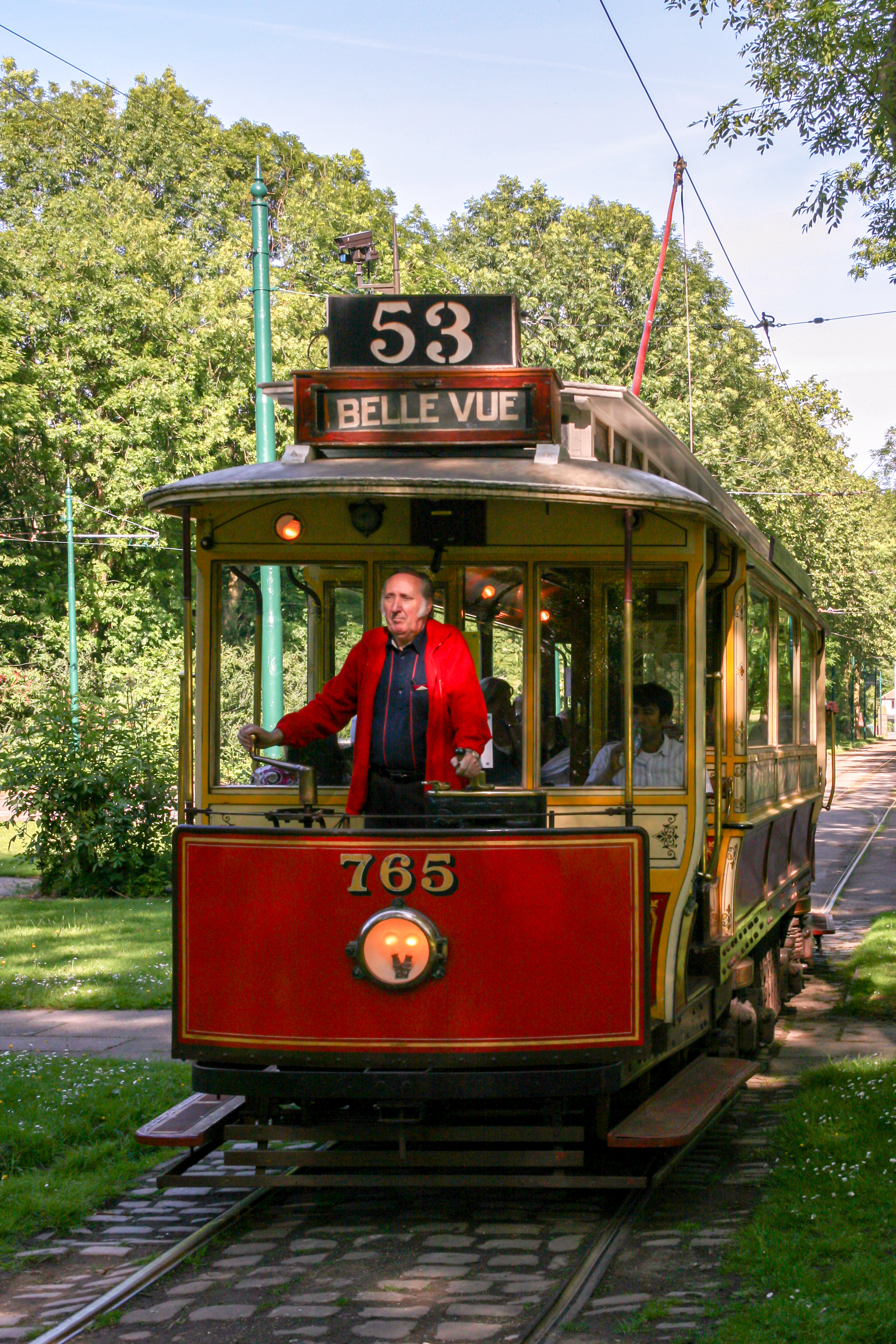
Tram number 765 in Heaton Park

Manchester Corporation Tramways 765 is the only remaining electric tramcar from Manchester Corporation Tramways in regular operation. It is at Heaton Park, Manchester, UK.

== History ==
No. 765 was built in 1914 and was one of a series of bogie cars, with a central saloon and open smoking compartments at the ends, built for routes such as the No. 53 route with low bridges. This design, whilst unusual in the UK, was commonly used on streetcar lines in California, and the design is often known as a California or combination car. The '53' route ran from Brooks's Bar to Cheetham Hill Road, via Belle Vue, forming an angular shape; two low bridges at Pottery Lane and Stanley Grove made running double-deckers impossible. The first batch of these trams made their appearance in Manchester in 1903 and over 60 were in the fleet. The first batch of these trams made their appearance in Manchester in 1903. The bogies were constructed by G. F. Milnes with car 765 being finally erected at the Hyde Road Car Works of MCT in Ardwick. Their route, the 53 was converted from trams to buses in 1930 and most of the combination cars were disposed of then.

== Restoration ==
No 765 is the only surviving Manchester combination car; having been stored in Yorkshire at Pioneer Farm, Blackmoorfoot, near Huddersfield. Members of the then Manchester Transport Historical Collection (MTHC) (later to become the Manchester Transport Museum Society (MTMS)) set about preserving the tram in 1960. For a period the tram was stored at the National Tramway Museum, Crich but was moved to the Birchfields Road depot in Rusholme, Manchester for restoration. After restoration it returned to Crich for a couple of years before returning to Manchester in 1979. Since then it has operated on the Heaton Park Tramway. Its bogies (trucks) are not the originals and are regauged ones from the Hill of Howth Tramway in Dublin, Ireland.

== Details ==
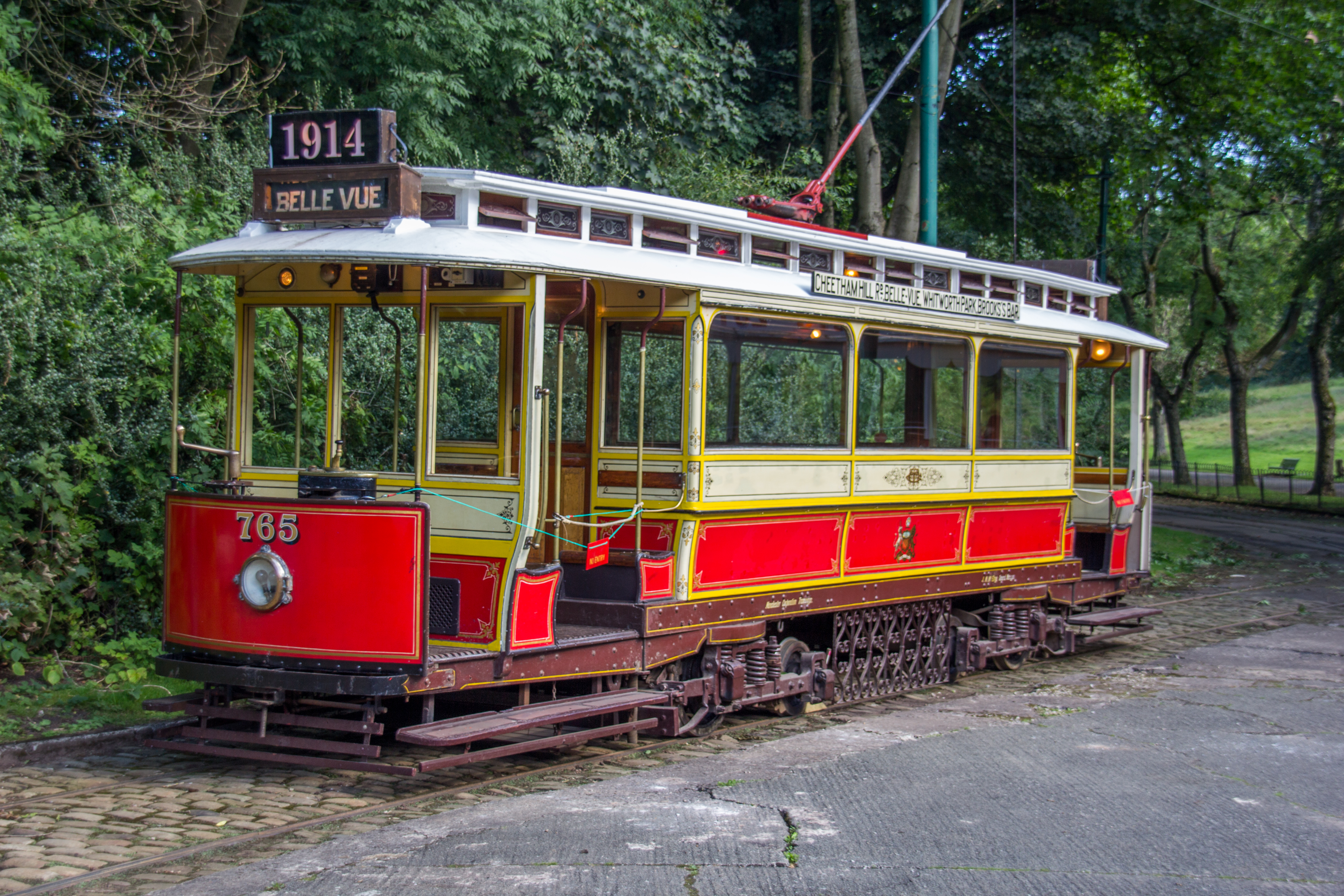
Tram number 765 in Heaton Park

Owners: Manchester Transport Museum Society, Heaton Park Tramway.

Type: Bogie combination single decker with open ends and central saloon

Body: United Electric Car Company, MCTD

Trucks: Brill 22E

Controllers: Dick Kerr DB1

Motors: BTH GE200, 2 × 35 horsepower (26 kW)

Seating: 40

Built: 1914

== Recent events ==
In June 2010 No. 765 was the first of many historic tramcars to go to Blackpool for Blackpool Tramway's 125th anniversary celebrations. No. 765 made several appearances in an episode (19 June 2009) on the Granada TV programme Coronation Street filmed in Heaton Park.

== Other sources ==
- Fisher, Jeffrey N. The Return of 765: the story of Heaton Park Tramway, Manchester Tramway Co.
- Heaton Park Tramway
