= Manchester Corporation Tramways =

Municipal operator of electric tram services in Manchester (1901-1949)

Overview
- Headquarters: Manchester
- Locale: England
- Dates of operation: 1901–1949
- Successor: Manchester Metrolink (in 1992)

Technical
- Track gauge: 4 ft 8 1/2 in (1,435 mm)
- Length: 292 miles (470 km) (peak); 163 miles (262 km) (route mile length)

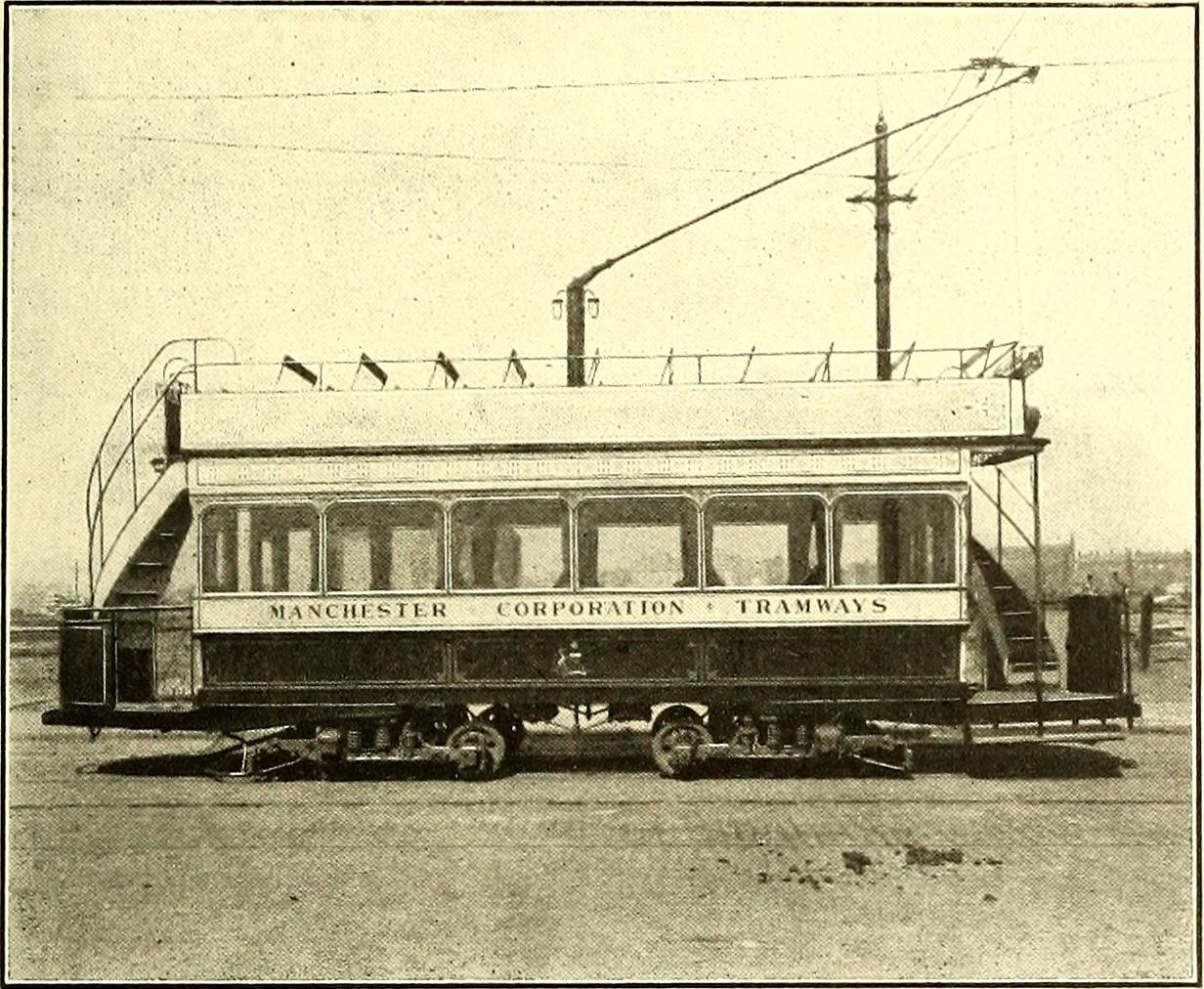
A Manchester tram, c. 1902

Between 1901 and 1949 Manchester Corporation Tramways (known as Manchester Corporation Transport Department from 1929 onwards) was the municipal operator of electric tram services in Manchester, England. At its peak in 1928, the organisation carried 328 million passengers on 953 trams, via 46 routes, along 292 miles (470 km) of track.

It was the United Kingdom's second-largest tram network after the services of 16 operators across the capital were combined in 1933 by the London Passenger Transport Board. Other large systems were in Glasgow (which had 100 miles of double track at its peak and Birmingham (80 miles).

The central and south-central Manchester area had one of the densest concentrations of tram services of any urban area in the UK. MCT services ran up to the edge of routes provided by other operators in (what is now) Greater Manchester, and in some instances had running rights over their lines and vice versa. There were extensive neighbouring systems in Salford, Oldham, Ashton, Hyde, Middleton, Rochdale, and elsewhere.

Services were withdrawn earlier than most other British cities to be replaced by trolleybus and motor buses. Trams did not return to the city until the modern light-rail system Manchester Metrolink opened in 1992.

== History ==
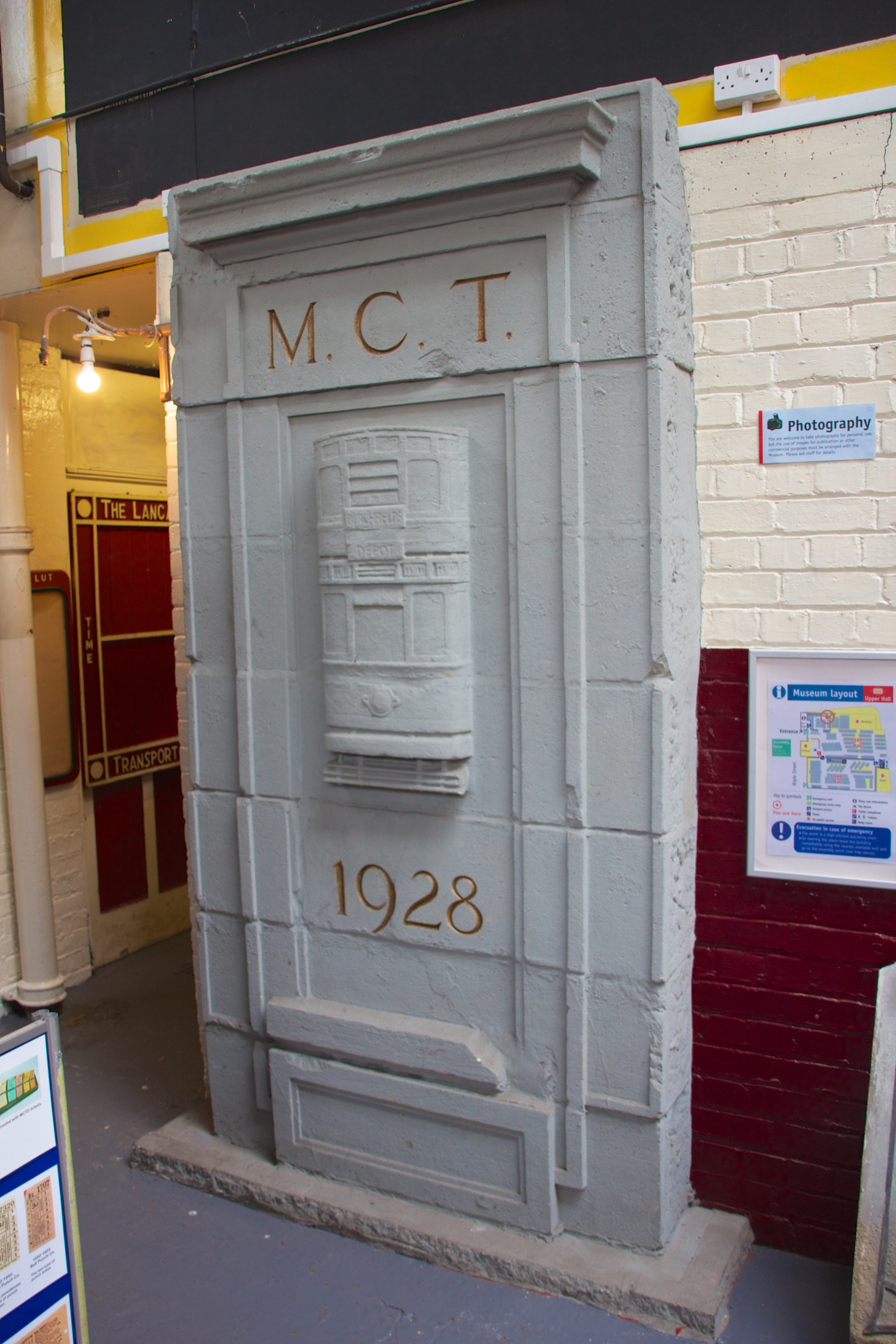
1928 facade at the Museum of Transport, Greater Manchester

Though horse-drawn omnibuses were first introduced in Manchester as early as 1824 (arguably the world's first bus service it was run by John Greenwood and ran between Market Street and Piccadilly and Pendleton toll gate in Salford). In the subsequent years, other companies joined the rush to provide services culminating by 1850 in 64 omnibuses serving the centre of Manchester from outlying areas. Passenger carrying trams had first began urban operation in Birkenhead in 1860. By 1865 Greenwood merged with the other operators to become the Manchester Carriage Company. The earliest proposals for the construction of rails on the streets of Manchester were made by Henry Osborn O'Hagan in 1872. Though these were resisted (partly because raised tram tracks had been the source of many accidents elsewhere), by 1875, road congestion was so great that the 'tramway' could not be delayed much longer. Working with the Corporation of Salford, Manchester successfully gained orders under the Tramways Act 1870 (33 & 34 Vict. c. 78), which permitted them to build and lease, but expressly not to operate, tramways. The first tracks, therefore, were built to allow the already existing lines from neighbouring Salford to run into the city along Deansgate.

As extensions and new lines were agreed, the Manchester Suburban Tramways Company was formed in 1877 to operate horse-drawn trams on the lines constructed by both local authorities. The company had a total fleet of more than 90 horse-drawn vehicles, and, in 1877, it was they who gained the concession to operate the tramway, using the name 'Manchester & Salford Tramways'. By 1901 this company used 5,000 horses to pull 515 tramcars over 140 route miles. Their first service, therefore, began on 17 May 1877, between Deansgate and Grove Inn on the Bury New Road. Just three years later a new organisation was formed called the Manchester Carriage and Tramways Company that continued with the expansion. By the 1890s it had turned itself into the most important transit operator in Lancashire. At their height, the company had 5,300 horses, pulling 515 tram cars on almost 90 miles of route using 515 cars. By 1896 outlying areas served included; Ashton-under-Lyne, Audenshaw, Droylsden, Failsworth, Gorton & Denton, Heaton Norris, Kersal, Levenshulme, Lower Broughton, Moss Side, Peel Green, Stalybridge, Stockport, Stretford, Swinton, Waterhead and Withington. There were also other horse-drawn tram services operating independently in some of the other settlements surrounding Manchester – notably Bolton and Stockport.

Another company which had been set up by Henry O'Hagan proposed a tram network for all the urban areas east of Manchester, from Bacup in the north via Rochdale, Oldham and Ashton to Hyde. The first Manchester, Bury, Rochdale and Oldham Steam Tramways Company line opened in 1883, though by 1887 the company was declared bankrupt. A new company with almost the same name was begun in 1888 (simply by deleting the word "Manchester" from its name) and successfully ran steam tramways until the municipalities began building and operating routes at the turn of the 20th century. The Wigan and District Tramways Company ran tram services between 1880 and 1902. On the other side of Manchester, the Trafford family sold their land following the opening of the Manchester Ship Canal in 1894, creating the Trafford Park Estates Company, which built a gas-powered tramway to serve the new factories in 1897. It was replaced by an electric-powered tram line within the industrial estate from July 1903. The idea of local authorities running tram systems was developed locally in both Bolton and Wigan when in 1899 the corporations bought the routes of the E. Holden & Company. This enabled investment and conversion of the Bolton lines to electric traction during December of that year (followed in 1901 by Wigan). In 1900 the South Lancashire Tramways Company was formed (later renamed Lancashire United Tramways and again Lancashire United Transport in 1905), which ran an extensive inter-urban system from Atherton.

== Birth of Manchester Corporation Tramways ==
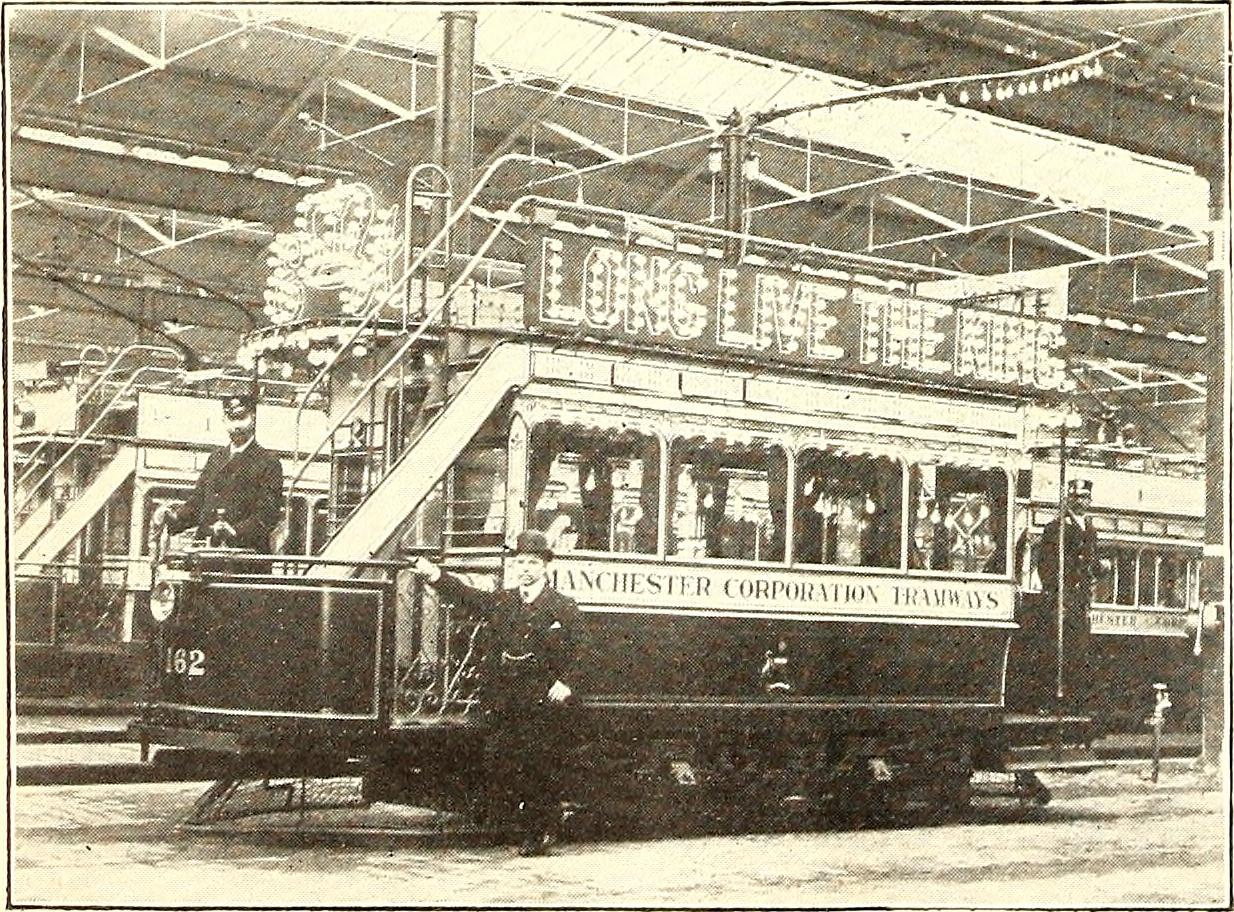
A Manchester tram in June 1902

The Manchester Carriage and Tramways Company leases were due to expire between 1898 and 1901, so the Corporation of Manchester agreed in 1895 to take over and modernise the existing tramways themselves. They sent inspectors to view the systems operated elsewhere in order to assess the best means of traction power and delivery for Manchester. The systems examined were: underground conduit, storage batteries, cable-hauled (used in Edinburgh), steam-powered (used by Leeds trams), oil, gas (used in Lytham St Annes), and a delegation was even sent to Paris to examine their compressed air system. The decision was then taken to use electrical power carried overhead but the track itself needed a complete overhaul from the horse-drawn days and at some junctions the track needed was to be so complex it even had to be ordered from the United States. It was thought that the initial requirement would be for as many as 600 electric cars but although this estimate was revised down to 400 it was still such a large number that it was beyond the manufacturing capacity of the period. Instead of having the entire network and fleet ready for the proposed opening in 1901, the Corporation gradually replaced the old Manchester & Salford Tramway routes as vehicles became available. Notwithstanding, over one hundred cars were delivered before the system opened from 1899 onwards.

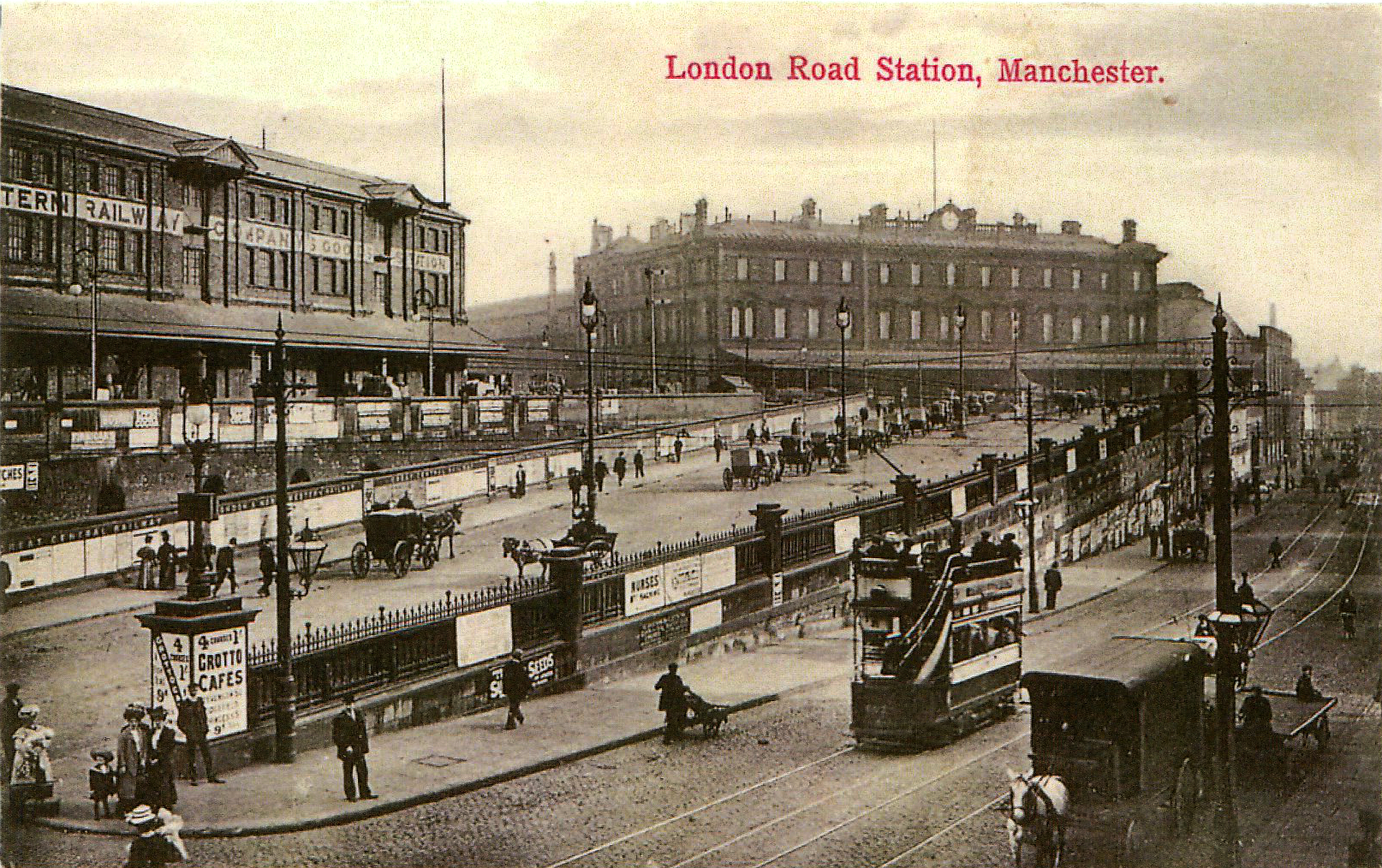
An MCT tram in front of Manchester London Road station in the 1900s.

The location for a new electrically equipped depot needed to be accessible to the first route so land on Queen's Road, Cheetham (part of a later extension to that depot is now home to the Greater Manchester's Museum of Transport) was purchased and on 12 June 1900, the foundation stone was laid. Following the installation of power lines between Albert Square and Cheetham Hill, this first part of the new operation was inaugurated on 6 June 1901 with public services starting the next day. It took £1,500,000 and until 1903 to rebuild and re-equip the rest of the then 140-mile network, and to receive delivery of the full set of new tram cars (mainly double-deck but with some single decks (known as California cars)—mainly used on the L-shaped route 53—were also ordered), but on 13 April that year, horses pulled their last trams within Manchester. Horse-drawn trams in London by comparison continued until 1915. By the end of 1901, further sections had been opened between Cheetham Hill Road and Rochdale Road; Deansgate and Hightown; High Street and Blackley; High Street and Moston Lane; and High Street and Queens Park. Only 252 cars could be housed at the Queen's Road depot so a further depot was constructed at Devonshire Street / Hyde Road in Ardwick—and it was opened at the end of 1902.

== Expansion and peak ==
Tram lines in central Manchester and Salford, ca. 1933

=== 1901–1910 ===
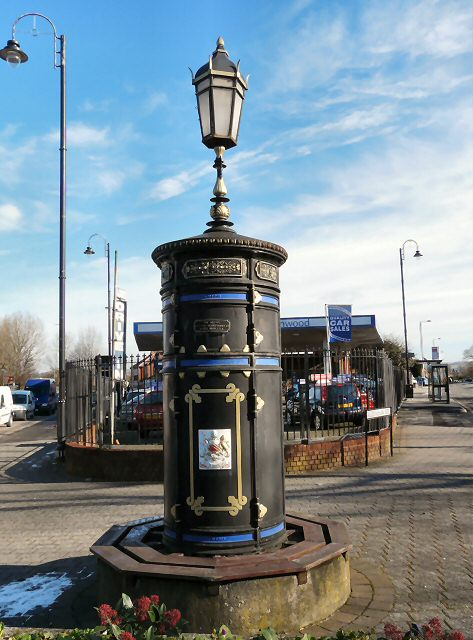
The Audenshaw transformer pillar

From 1902 onwards both Salford and Manchester tram systems, uniquely in Britain, employed uniformed "trolley boys" – over a thousand at their peak (Jan 1930) – whose job it was to assist guards on double-truck trams by giving the driver a bell signal at the stops and helping passengers on and off. Because by the early 1900s multiple organisations were owning various sections of tramways in Manchester and surrounding areas, Manchester took the lead in rebuilding and electrifying their routes so that they could be leased back for operational services. The largest boroughs (Ashton-under-Lyne, Oldham, and Salford) continued to operate their own lines and began their own modernisation. At Bury, Oldham, and Rochdale, the steam services were also brought under the control of the local municipalities. In 1904 the Glossop Urban District Supply Company was set up to provide electric trams to Dukinfield, Glossop, Hyde, Mossley, and Stalybridge. The short 2.5 mile run in Trafford Park came under the joint control of the Corporations of Manchester and Salford.

The tracks arrived in Piccadilly, home of the Corporation Tramway offices, on 1 June 1902. By the end of the following year services from Piccadilly reached: Alexandra Park, Audenshaw, Denton, Hollinwood, Moss Side, Old Trafford, Openshaw, Newton Heath, St. Peter's Square and Stretford. By 1903 Manchester Corporation had just over 300 cars. The trams were also used to carry parcels from 1905. As late as winter 1905, horse-drawn buses still ran between Palatine Road and Cheadle and on down to Northenden, as well as on the route between Chorlton-cum-Hardy and Hulme. Manchester Corporation Tramways proposed an experimental motor bus to replace them from 1906, effectively and portentously becoming both a tram and bus operator. By 1910, the 582 cars in service running over 100 route miles were generating a profit of £150,000. Yet another depot was needed and Princess Road in Moss Side was opened on 9 June 1909 which would house nearly 300 tram cars.

=== 1911–1920 ===
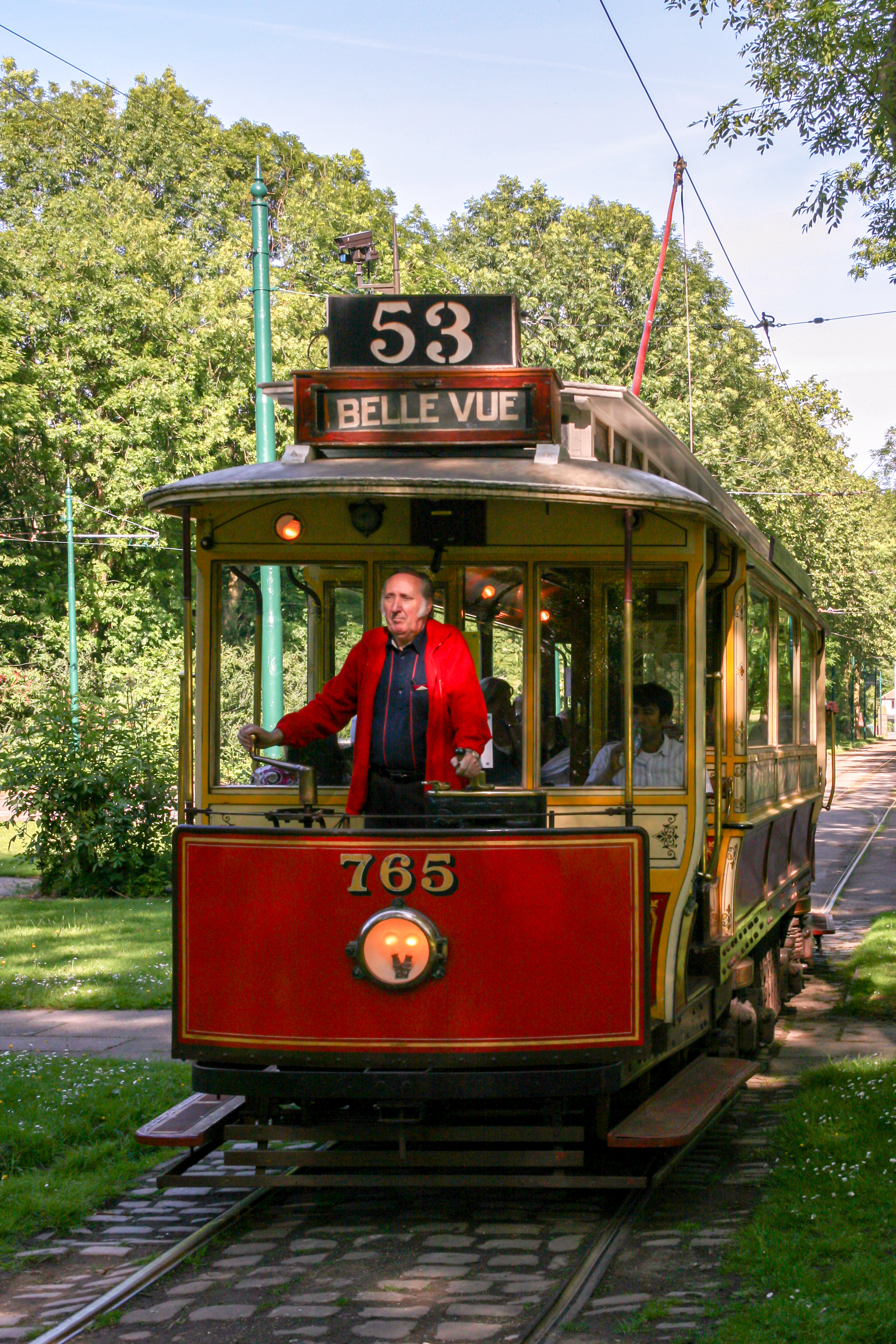
Manchester Corporation Tramways 765 in Heaton Park (formerly used on service 53 through Moss Side)

In the run-up to the start of the First World War, there was an enormous expansion and consolidation of tram services to the extent that by 1915 trams were the most popular form of transit; the Manchester system was carrying 200 million passenger journeys a year on 662 vehicles (there were only a handful of buses at this time). It was then possible to traverse by tram the entire urban area now known as Greater Manchester, and far into the surrounding towns of Lancashire and Cheshire, many of which had their independent services. The extent of this inter-urban tram running compares with that found in parts of Belgium. Many of these services were also amalgamating or joint running. Stockport trams ran directly into Manchester with routes to Cheadle, Hazel Grove and Hyde. By 1913 there were so many services running in and out of Manchester city centre that the route names had to be replaced with route numbers – up to 46 MCT numbered routes are known though there were also some sub-sets of these routes. Despite the arrest of development and damage of the war years between 1914–1918 transport expansion was quick to be re-established. Women had been employed during the war as tram guards but there were shortages of materials and maintenance staff that led to the deterioration of both the track and the vehicle fleet. In 1918 the city's Medical Officer of Health closed the tram network to help stop the spread of Spanish flu.

=== 1921–1930 ===
In 1921 the Manchester Corporation formed a new body with Ashton Corporation and Stalybridge Joint Board which took over the Oldham, Ashton, and Hyde Tramway allowing Manchester trams to run on the Ashton via Guide Bridge section. Due to price rises after the war, operational costs rose from £681,000 in 1919 to £1,520,000 by 1922. This led to calls from some quarters for tram expansion to be halted. Middleton Electric Traction Company was jointly taken over by Middleton, Chadderton and Rochdale authorities in 1923. Middleton then granted Manchester a lease to operate on their former tracks in exchange for allowing them to run Corporation trams right into Rochdale. Buses became one of the fastest-growing areas (Manchester Corporation went from 16 vehicles in 1923 to 51 in 1926). However new tram lines were still being commissioned especially on the south side of the city (serving Anson Rd, Birchfields Rd, Kingsway, Platt Lane, Princess Road, Seymour Grove) and also in the north (at Heywood, Middleton and on Victoria Avenue). A final addition to the tram system came in 1928 when it was connected with the Bury Corporation system from the Middleton line to Hopwood in Heywood. This expansion signalled the maximum extent the MCT system reached in 1929–30 with 123 route miles (292 track miles) and 953 electric cars, making it the third-largest system in the country. Only the tram networks serving (what became Greater) London (around 400 route miles) and Glasgow (about 170 route miles) were bigger.

== Decline and replacement ==
In spring 1929 a decision was needed to replace the track on the circular 53 route. Because the tracks passed beneath a number of low bridges, running double-deck trams had been impossible. In order to increase capacity, it would have been necessary to increase the bridge height and that was seen as prohibitively expensive so the decision was taken by the new general manager Mr. Stuart Pilcher, to replace the trams with motorbuses between Stretford Road and Cheetham Hill. The effect was to increase passenger numbers by 11 per cent and the route became profitable to operate; thus commencing the start of tramway abandonment. In recognition of the growing importance of bus services, Pilcher managed to get the company name changed to Manchester Corporation Transport this year.

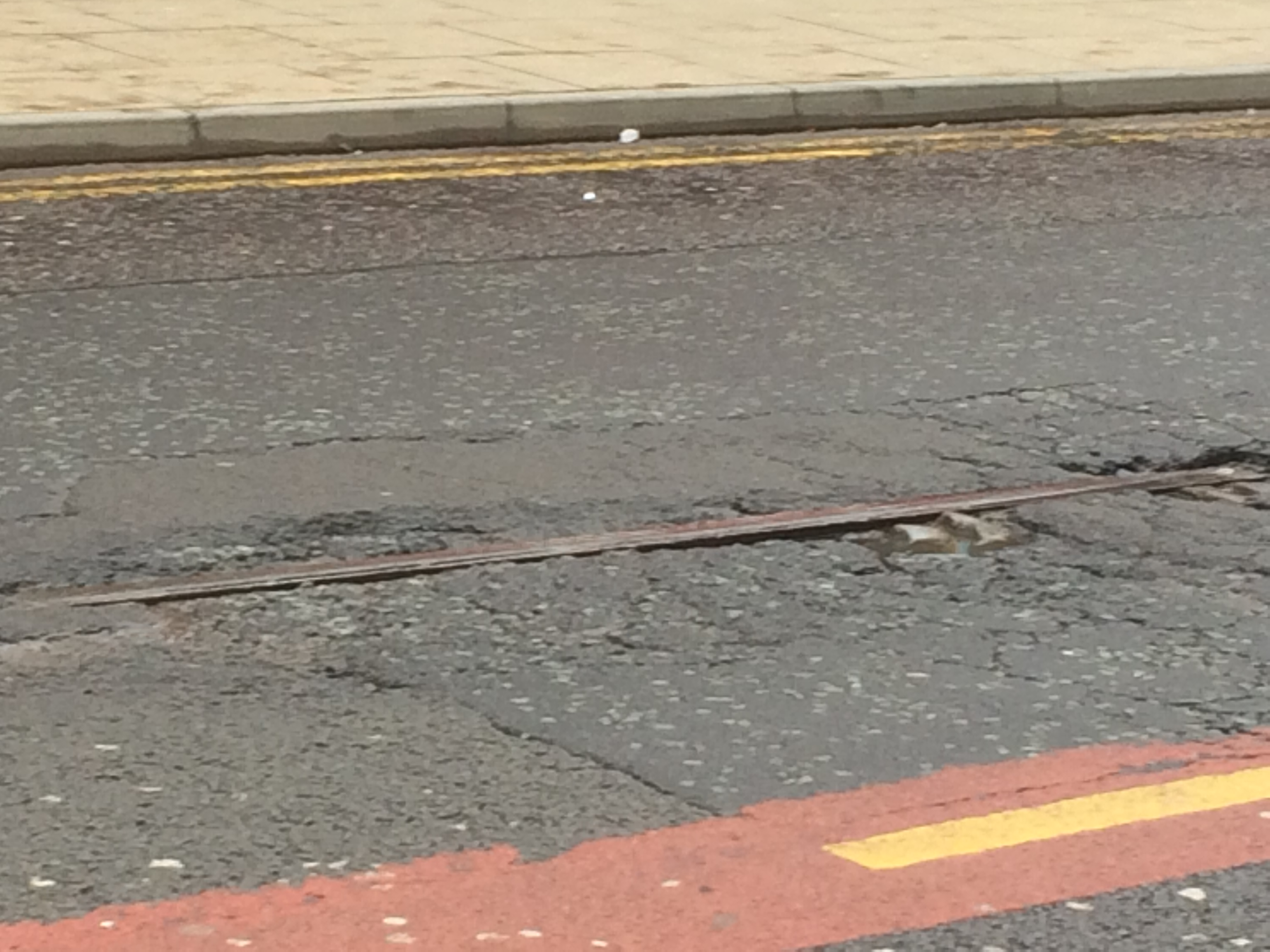
A pothole reveals old tram tracks under Lever Street, Manchester

Elsewhere profits were being made on Express bus services, 27 in all, many running on the same routes as trams. In the early 1930s, tramcar revenue was lower than operating costs on some services and yet more replacement work was due and more buses were introduced. The city council decided to abandon plans to extend the tramway to the new and rapidly expanding large council housing estate of Wythenshawe and to withdraw the trolley boys. No more new trams were ordered. Pilcher organised the UK's first major conversion of an intensively used tram route to buses in the United Kingdom when on 6 April 1930 the service from Cheetham Hill to Stretford Road was abandoned to the motorbus. Manchester's bus fleet then numbered over 100, and with lower overheads and profits increasing after conversion, Pilcher was seen as the man who persuaded some cynics that trams were outdated for British cities and that buses were the future. Thirty years after their initial opening, the old tram routes were showing the need for capital expenditure on new infrastructure – Pilcher used this as one of the main reasons to push ahead with conversion to buses.

Major investment was needed for bridge widening on the long route to Altrincham, therefore in June 1931, the trams were replaced by buses. It was followed a month later by the line to Sale Moor and in 1932 the long run-up to Middleton got the chop. 12 November 1932 saw the Rochdale to Manchester trams being pulled out of service by Rochdale Corporation. In 1936 the council decided to replace the old trams on Ashton Old Road with new trolleybuses. A depot for the Manchester trolleybus system was opened on Rochdale Road in 1936. By March 1938, 75 miles of single track tramway had been abandoned and 21 tram routes converted to motor or trolleybus. In 1939, 351 new motor buses and 77 trolleybuses were ordered (although 236 of the motor buses arrived before the start of the Second World War).

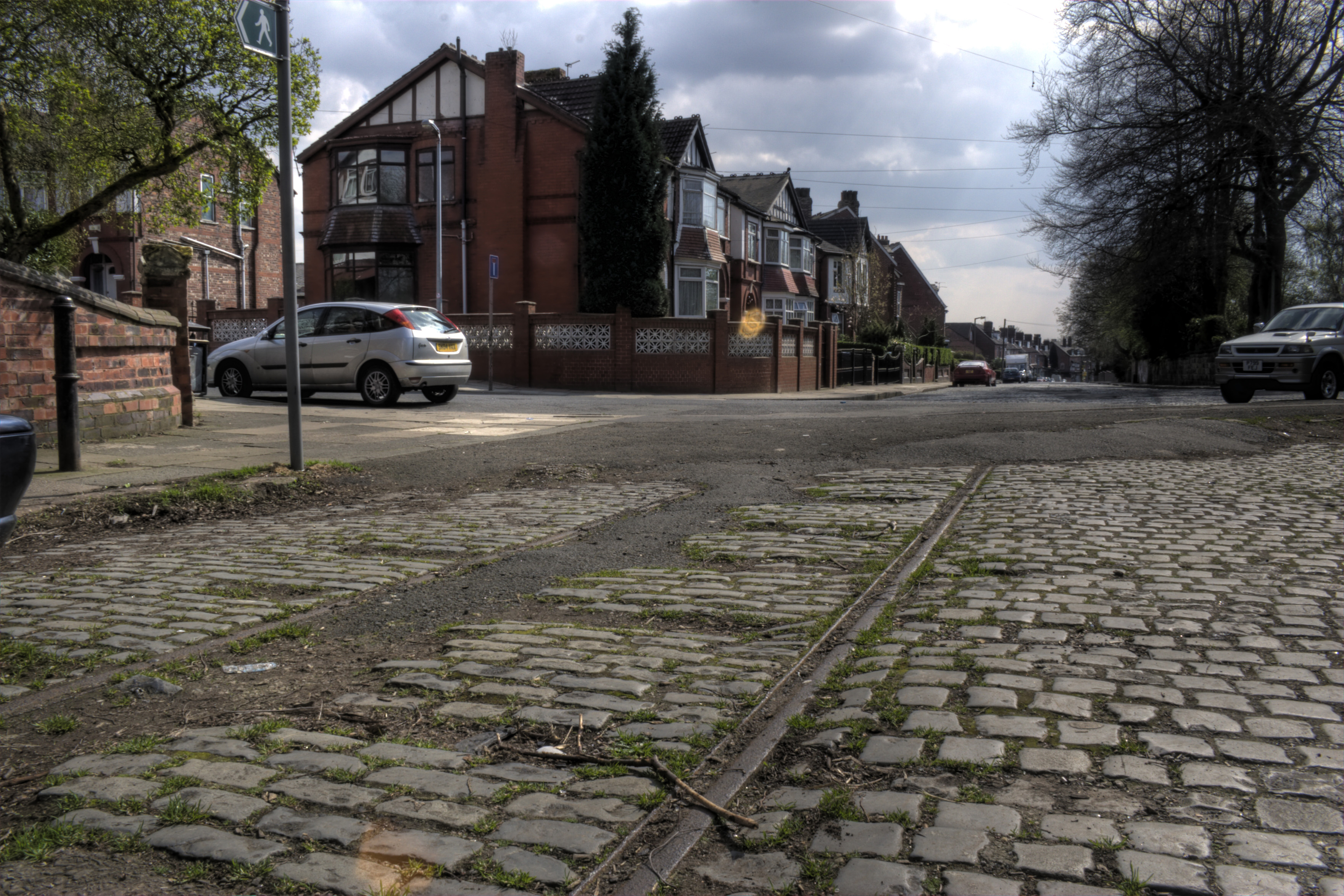
Intact tram lines near the end of Great Clowes Street in Salford

The final decision to completely abandon the tram system in favour of trolleybuses and motor buses was taken on 7 July 1937 but the onset of war delayed some of this. However, during the war 4917 tons of steel were turned over to the war effort by removing abandoned tram tracks. In 1945 the final SHMD Joint Board tramcar ran, the last tram in Oldham followed in 1946, and those in Bolton and Salford ended in 1947. By 1949 just a few miles of track were left in Manchester and the last tram ran on 10 January of that year. The last of the old tram cars were stored at Hyde Road depot until on 16 March they were set ablaze in a huge bonfire, permanently signifying an end to what was once the third-largest tramway system in the country. A few trams were sold to other operators: the last of these in public service were in Aberdeen, in 1956. The trams continued in Bury for a further month and the last tram ran in Stockport during 1951. The trolley bus routes remained until they were also abandoned by December 1966.

== Museums ==
A short line in Heaton Park has been restored to occasional service, and currently has an operating fleet of 3 electric trams and one horse tram. One of these, tramcar, No 765, was used as a chicken coop for many years before being restored in the 1960s by a group of enthusiasts working under the guidance of retired tramways employees at MCTD's Birchfields depot. Once work had been completed it was stored at the museum at Crich in Derbyshire, before permanently moving to Heaton Park in 1979.

== See also ==
- Transport in Manchester
- Daniel Boyle (politician)
