= California car (streetcar) =

Type of tram or street car with both open sided and enclosed sections

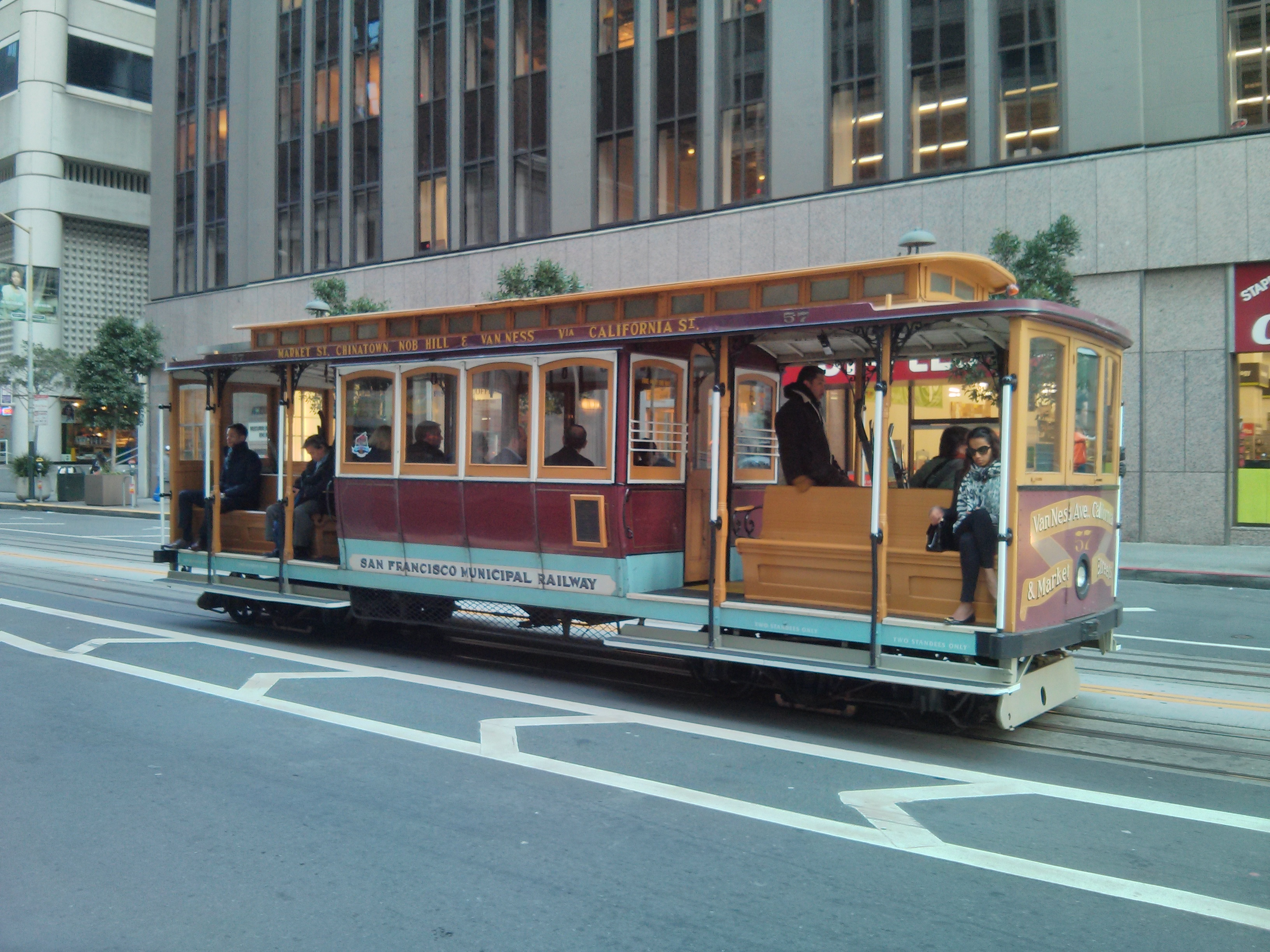
This San Francisco cable car illustrates the typical California car arrangement of an enclosed central seating compartment with open seating on either end of the car.

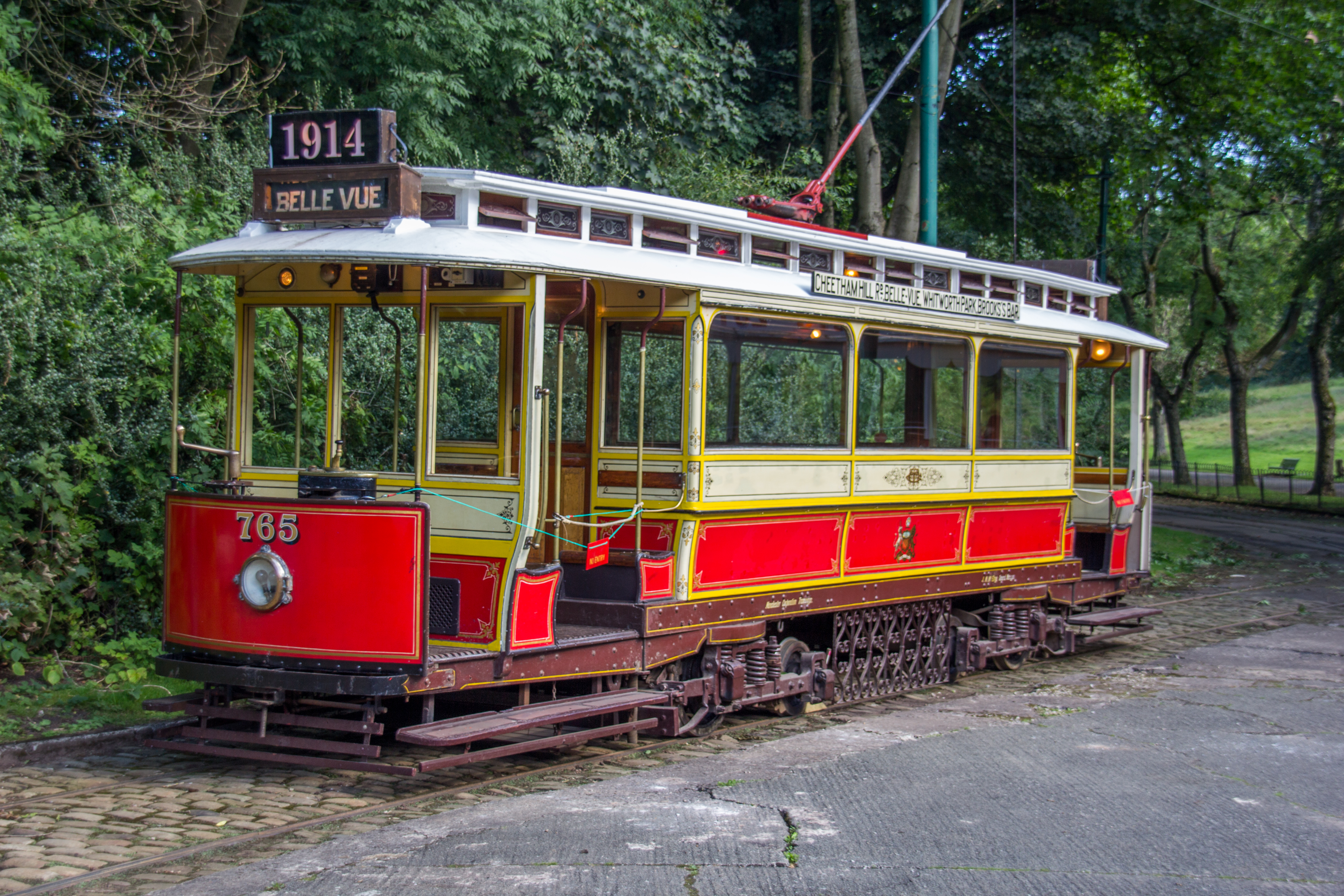
Manchester Corporation Tramways 765

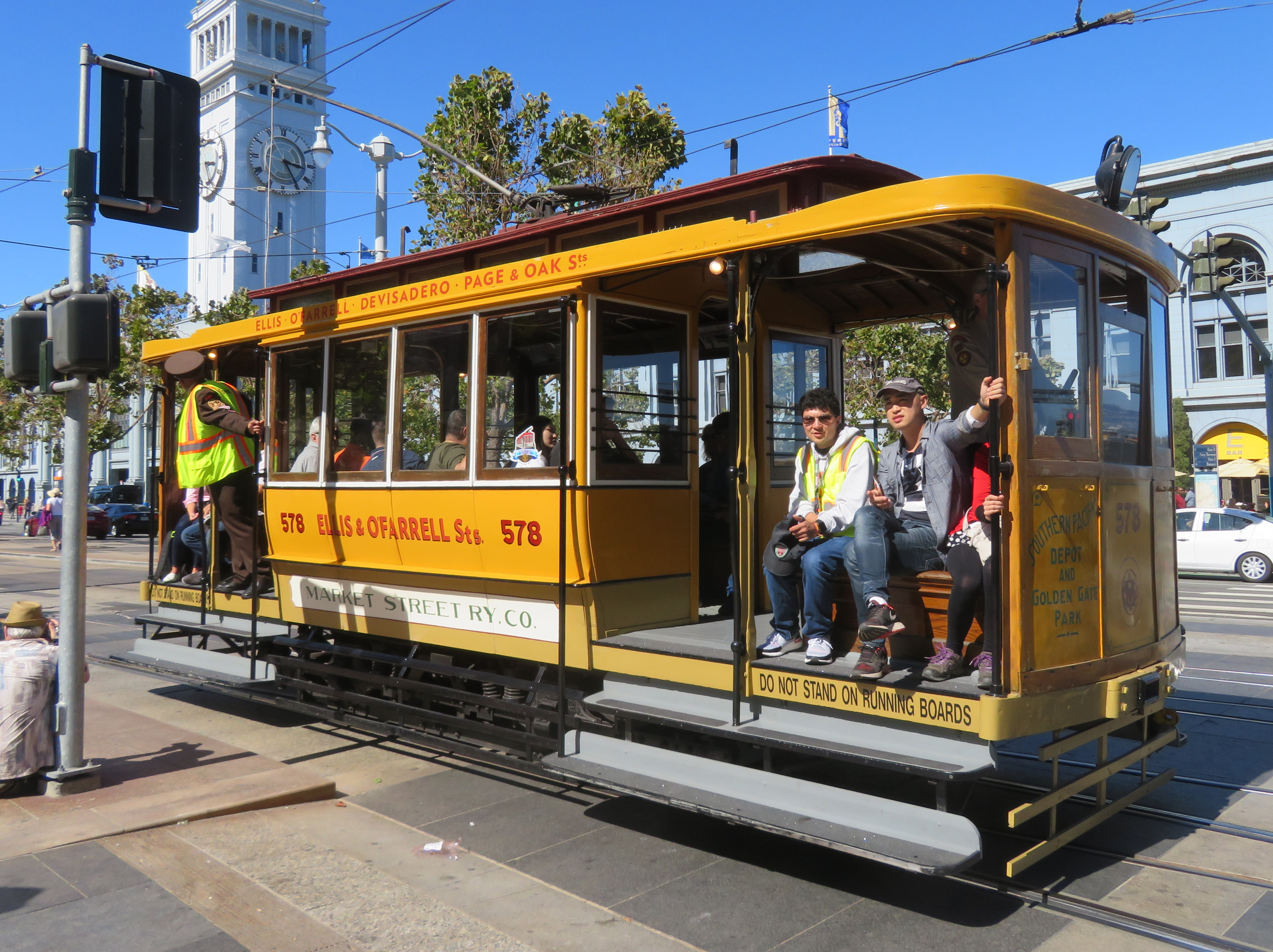
San Francisco electric streetcar 578

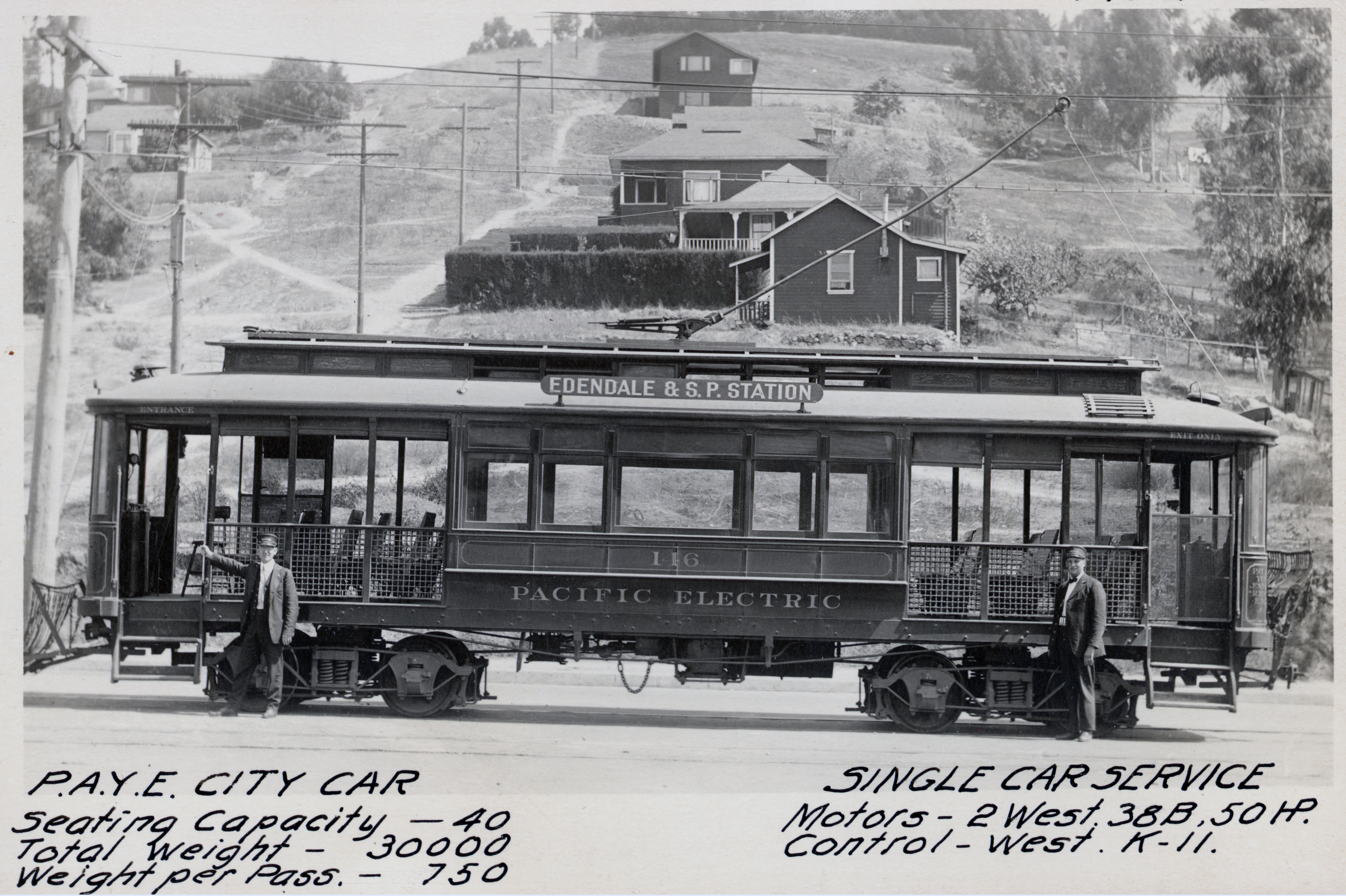
Pacific Electric 146 – a California car example

A California car is a type of single-deck tramcar or streetcar that features a center, enclosed seating compartment and roofed seating areas without sides on either end. These cars were popular in California's mild Mediterranean climate offering passengers a choice of shaded outdoor seating during hot weather, or more protected seating during cool or rainy weather. They were also used in other climates to provide separate outdoor smoking and enclosed non-smoking areas. Some very early motor buses also used the combination car design.

Early San Francisco cable car lines used two cars: a grip car (or "dummy") which contained the grip mechanism and a brake, and the trailer which carried passengers. A new car, called a combination car, was eventually developed which combined the trailer and the grip car into one vehicle. The combination car had one enclosed end and an open end with seats and the grip.

In 1888, the California Street Cable Railroad Company commissioned a new car from John L. Hammond and Co., with two open ends and a center enclosed section. Placed in service in 1889, this double-ended combination car, dubbed a “California Type” car, could be operated from either end, which eliminated the need for a turntable at the ends of the lines.

The design was also applied to many electric streetcars in the late 1890s and 1900s. Henry Huntington’s engineers developed a standard streetcar design in the California car style in 1902 for his Los Angeles Railway (LARy). Called the “Huntington Standard”, it featured a center enclosed section, open sections on either end with wire sides rather than solid sides, and a distinctive five-window front and rear. Eventually, LARy had 747 of these cars in service. The cars were featured in early silent movies, becoming indelibly linked in moviegoers’ minds with southern California. Other railways that adopted the design included the Pacific Electric Railway, the San Francisco, Napa and Calistoga Railway, The Key System’s East Shore and Suburban Railway .

California cars are still operational on the San Francisco cable car system. Both the single-ended cars on the Powell–Hyde and Powell–Mason lines, and the double-ended cars on the California Street line, are of this type. The single-ended type has a single open section at the front of the car, with a closed compartment at the rear, whilst the double-ended type has a central closed compartment with an open area at each end.

Several California cars are now preserved and/or used on heritage operations. These include:

- Los Angeles Railway 521, an electric streetcar now preserved by the Seashore Trolley Museum
- Manchester Corporation Tramways 765, an electric tram now preserved and operated on its home city's Heaton Park Tramway
- San Francisco Muni 578, an electric streetcar of similar design to that city's cable cars, now preserved by the Market Street Railway and occasionally operated
