= Bury Transport Museum =

Coordinates: 53.5946°N 2.3007°W

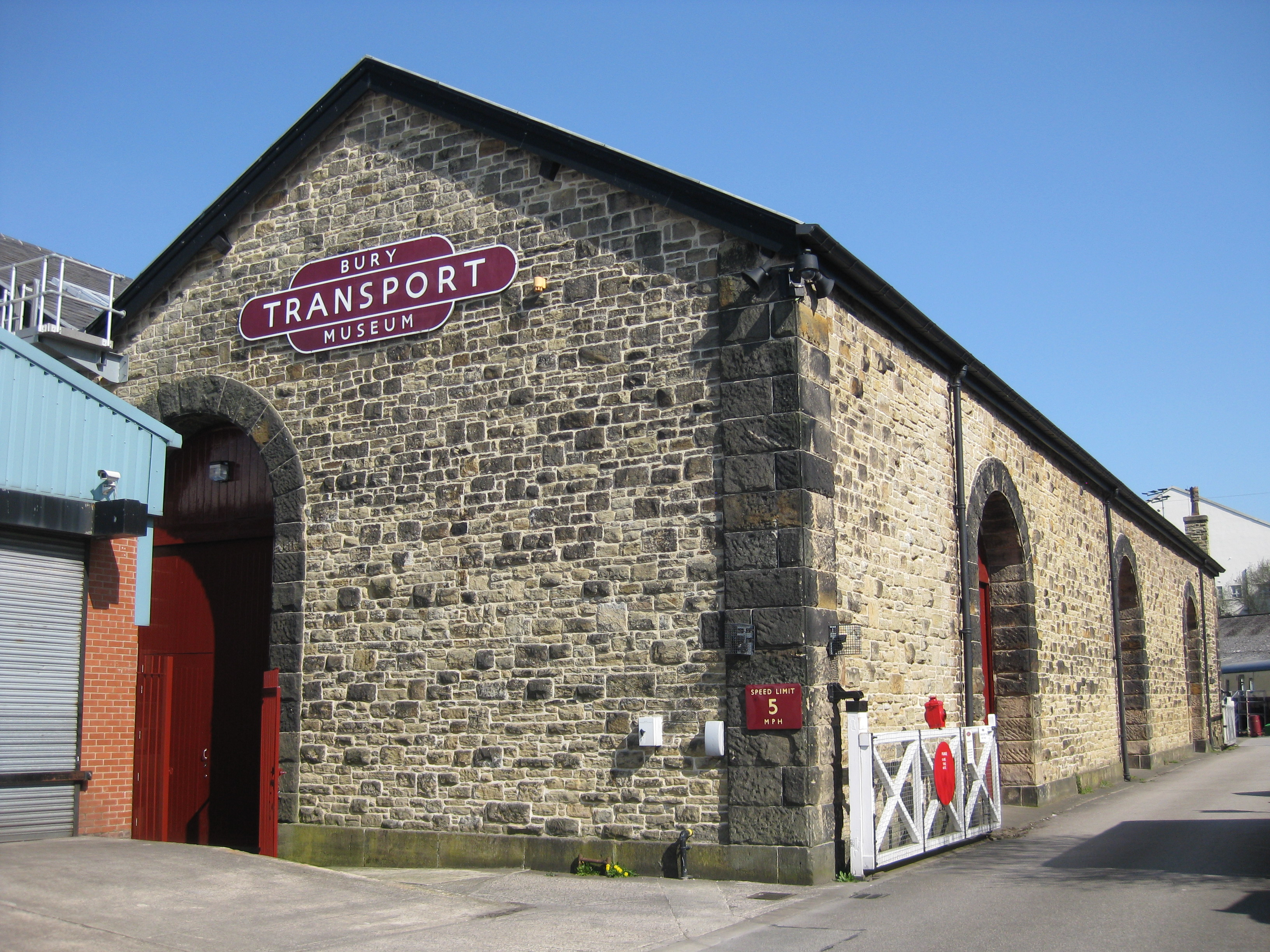
- Established: 1973; 53 years ago
- Location: Bolton Street, Bury BL9 0EY
- Type: Transport museum
- Owner: East Lancashire Railway
- Website: http://www.eastlancsrailway.org.uk/plan-your-day-out/bury-transport-museum.aspx

Bury Transport Museum is a transport museum in Bury, Greater Manchester, situated in the former Castlecroft Goods Warehouse, a Grade II listed building from 1846, on Castlecroft Road, with the main entrance from Bolton Street, BL9 0EY.

It was started in 1973 by volunteers of the East Lancashire Railway, had to close in 2003 because of roof problems but opened again in 2010. Between May 2022 and early 2023 the museum had LNER Class A4 4488 Union of South Africa on static display. The locomotive was removed on 21 April 2023.

In December 2023 LMS 3-Cylindered Stanier 2-6-4T No. 2500 was loaned to the museum from the National Railway Museum. In March 2025 a World War one Memorial to the men of the Lancashire and Yorkshire Railway who died in military service was moved to the museum from Newton Heath Train Care Centre.

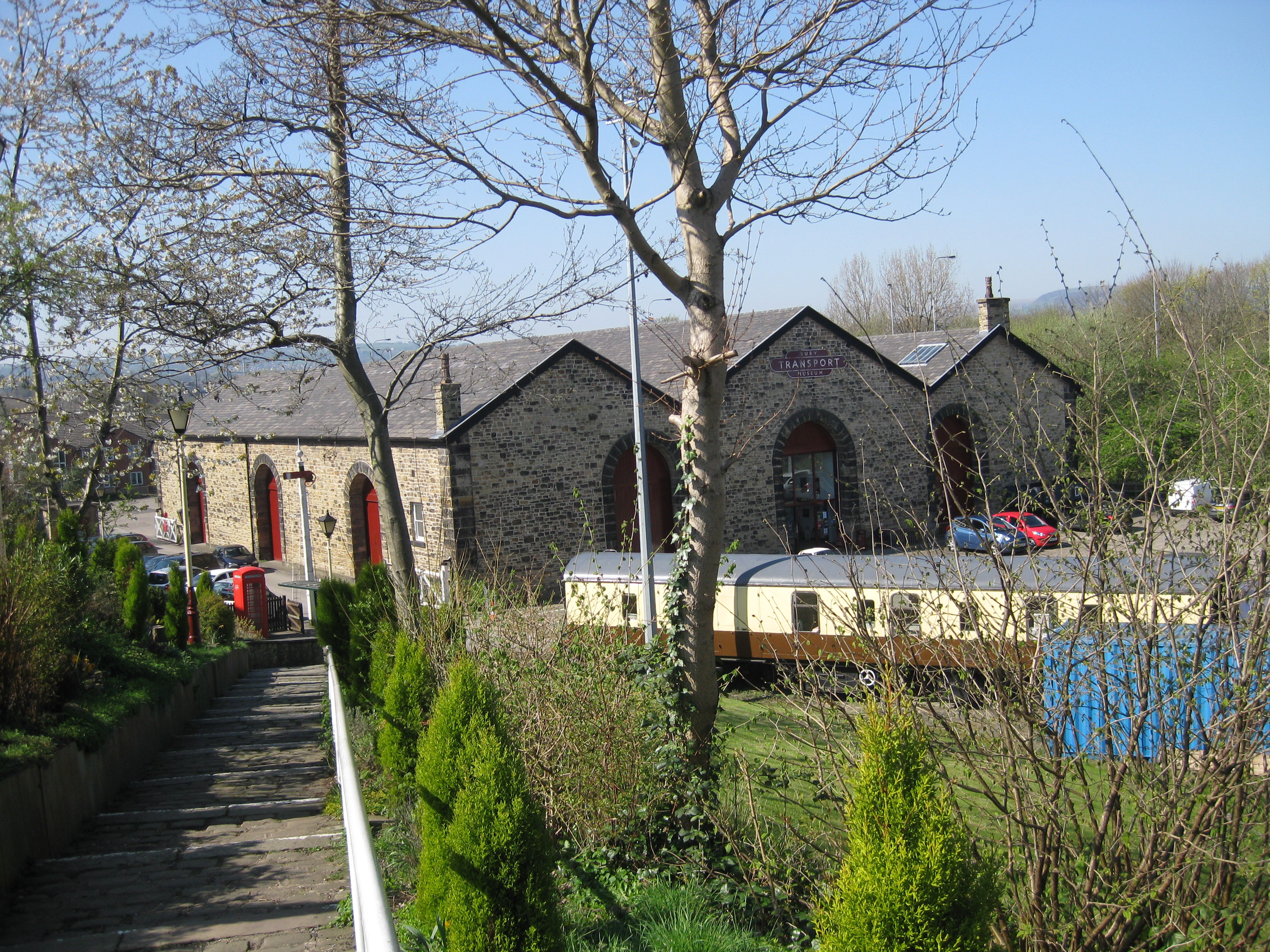
East Exterior

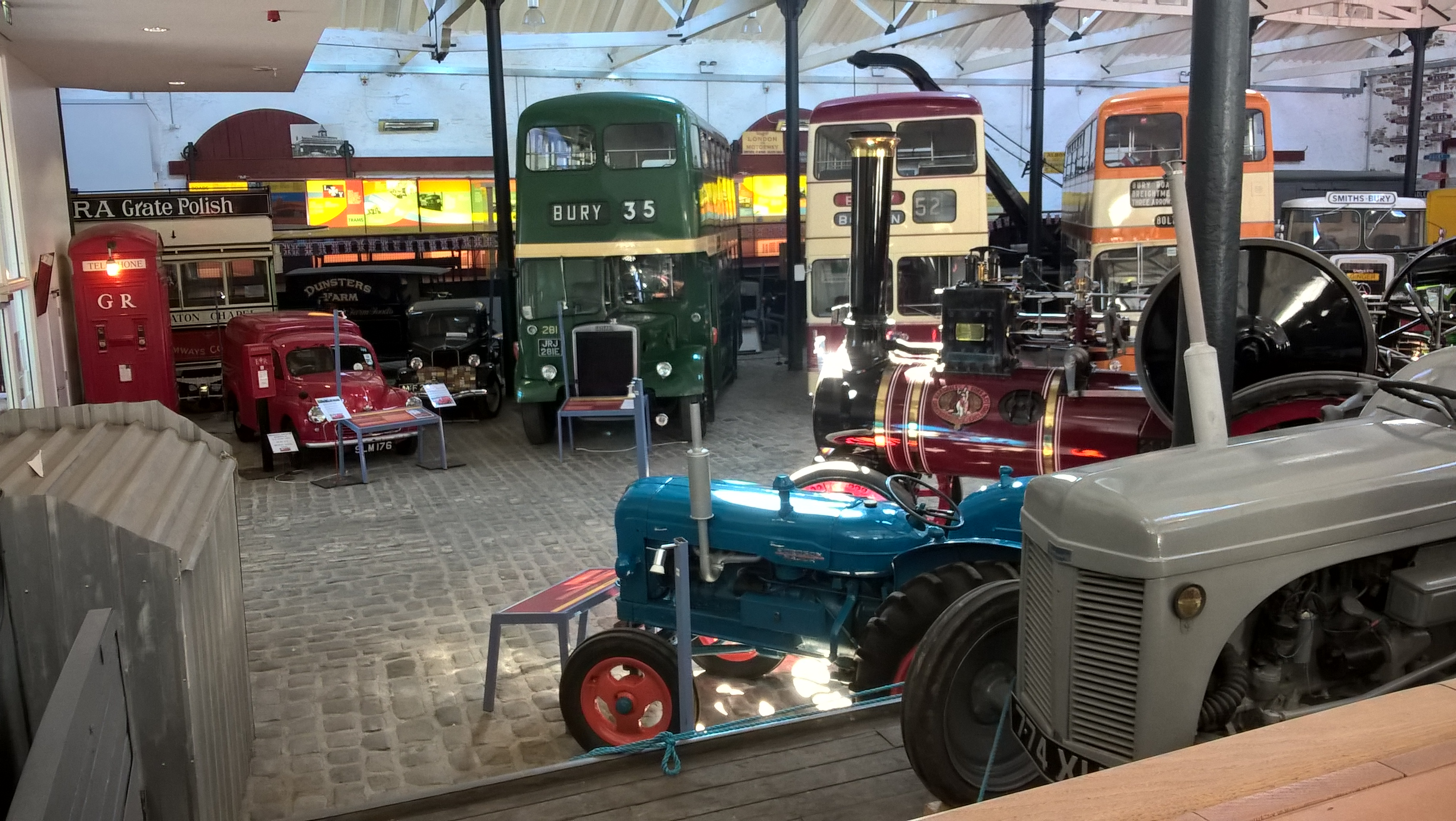
Part of vehicles display

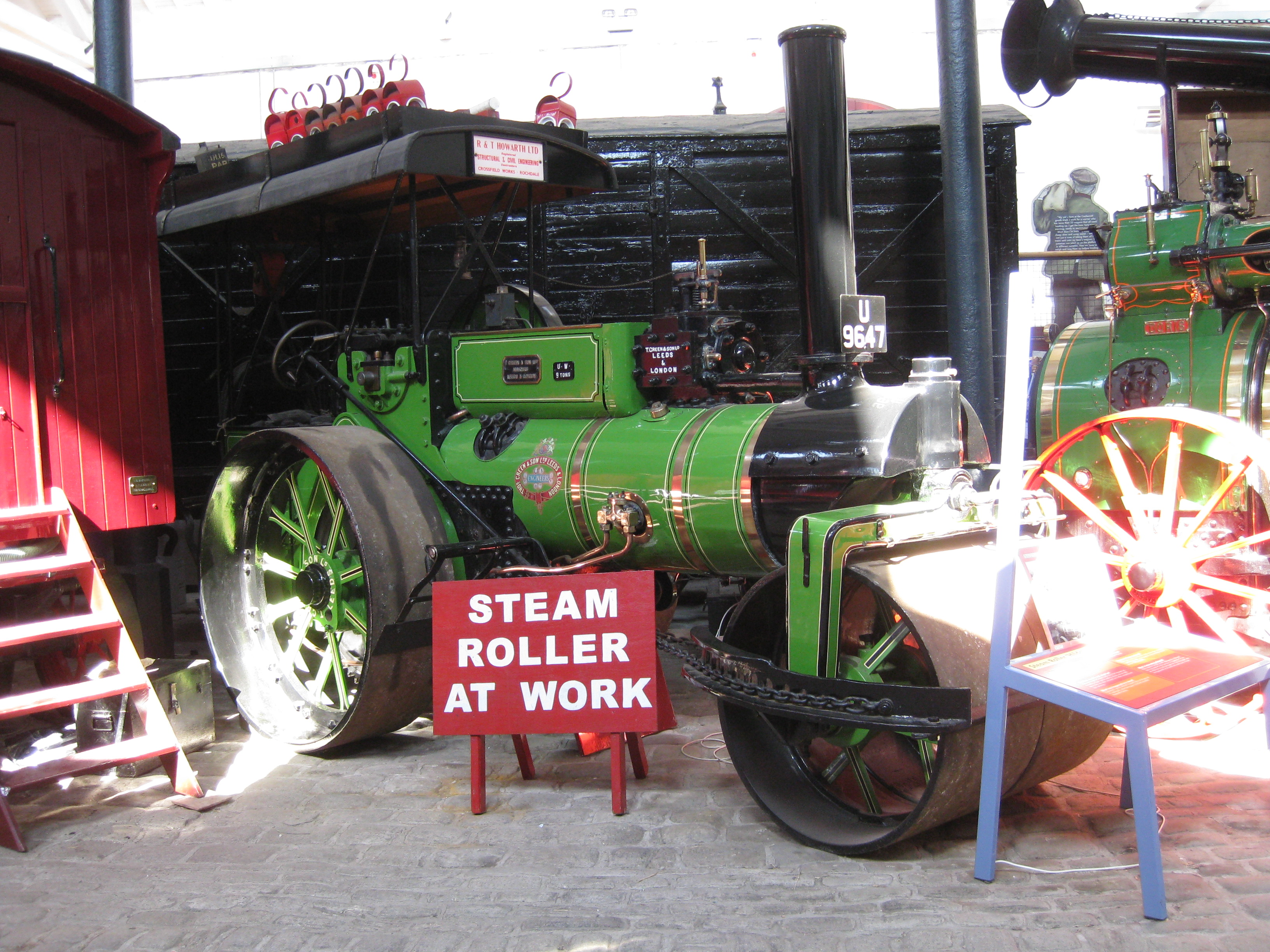
Steam roller 'Hilda'

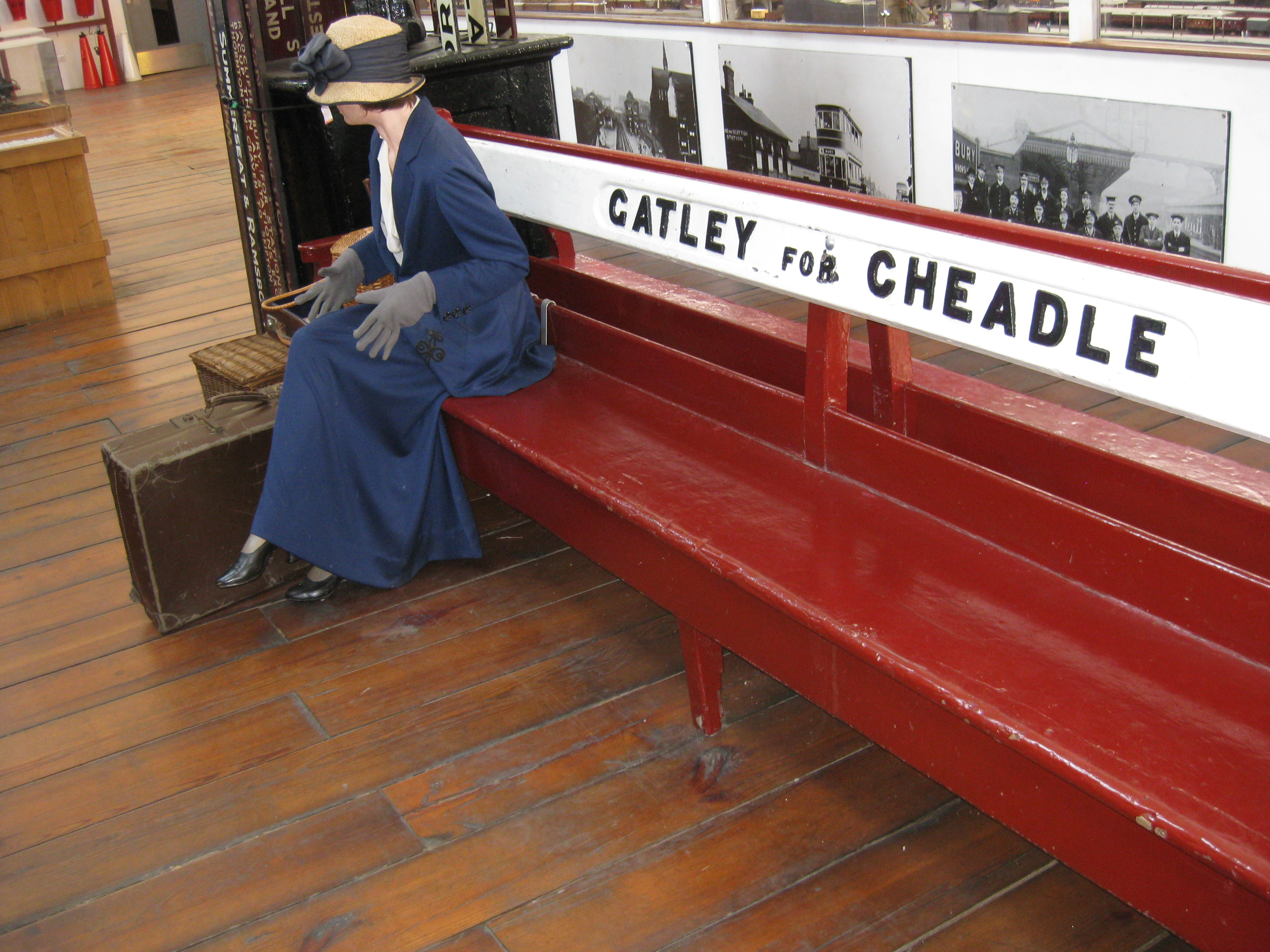
Model of woman sitting on a station bench where visitors can also sit

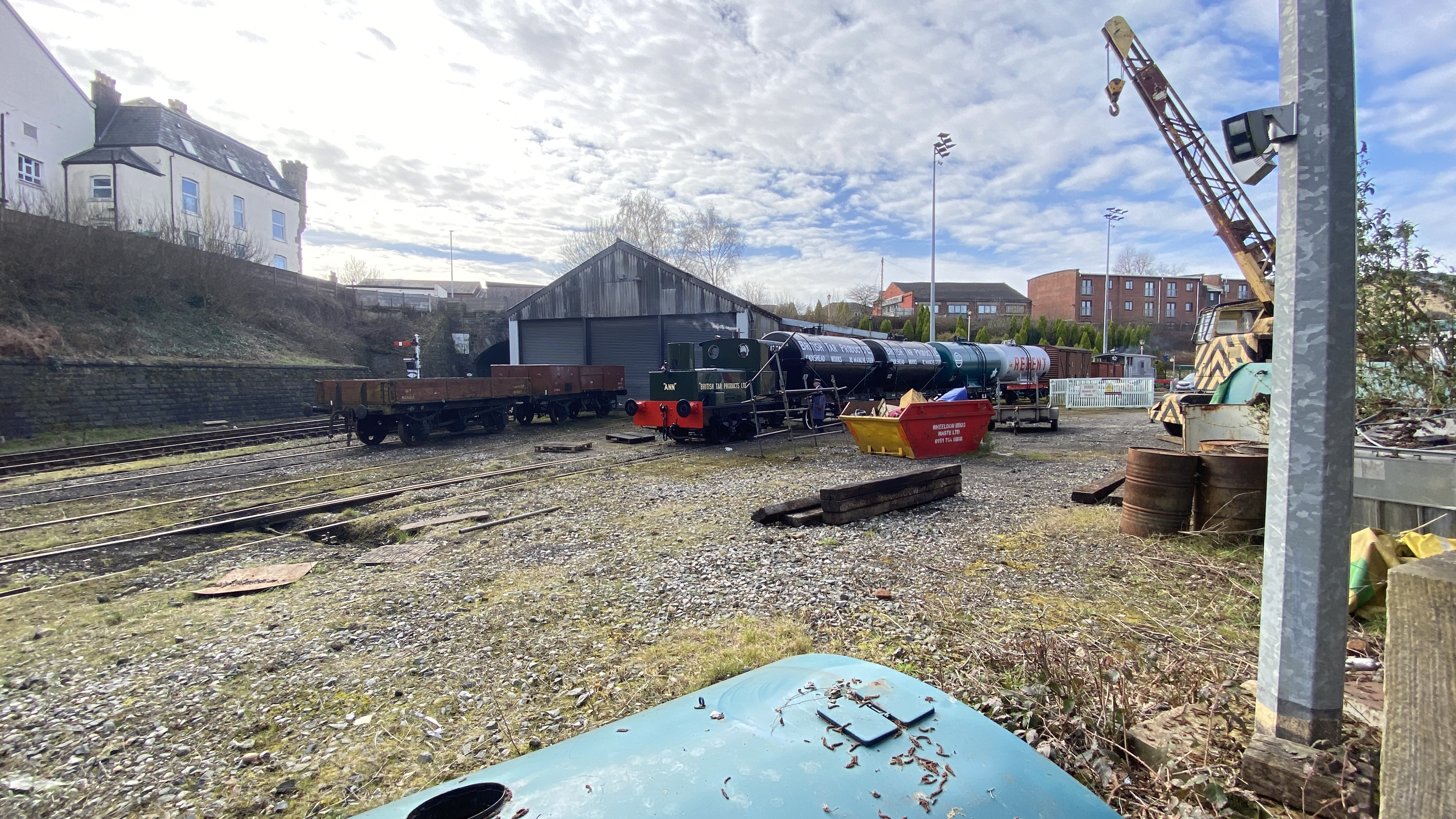
"Ann" taking part in Demonstration Shunting

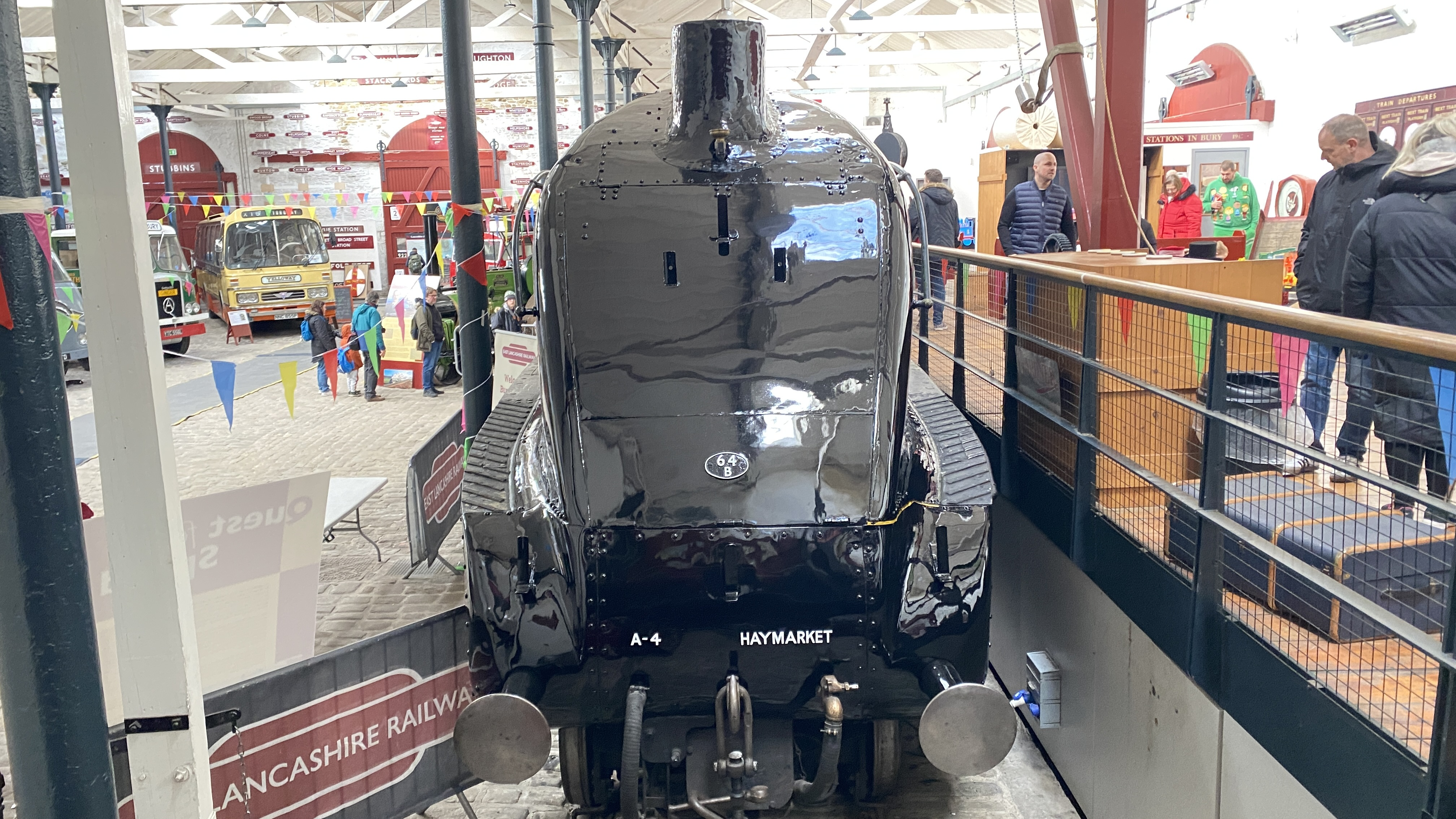
60009 In the museum during being repainted

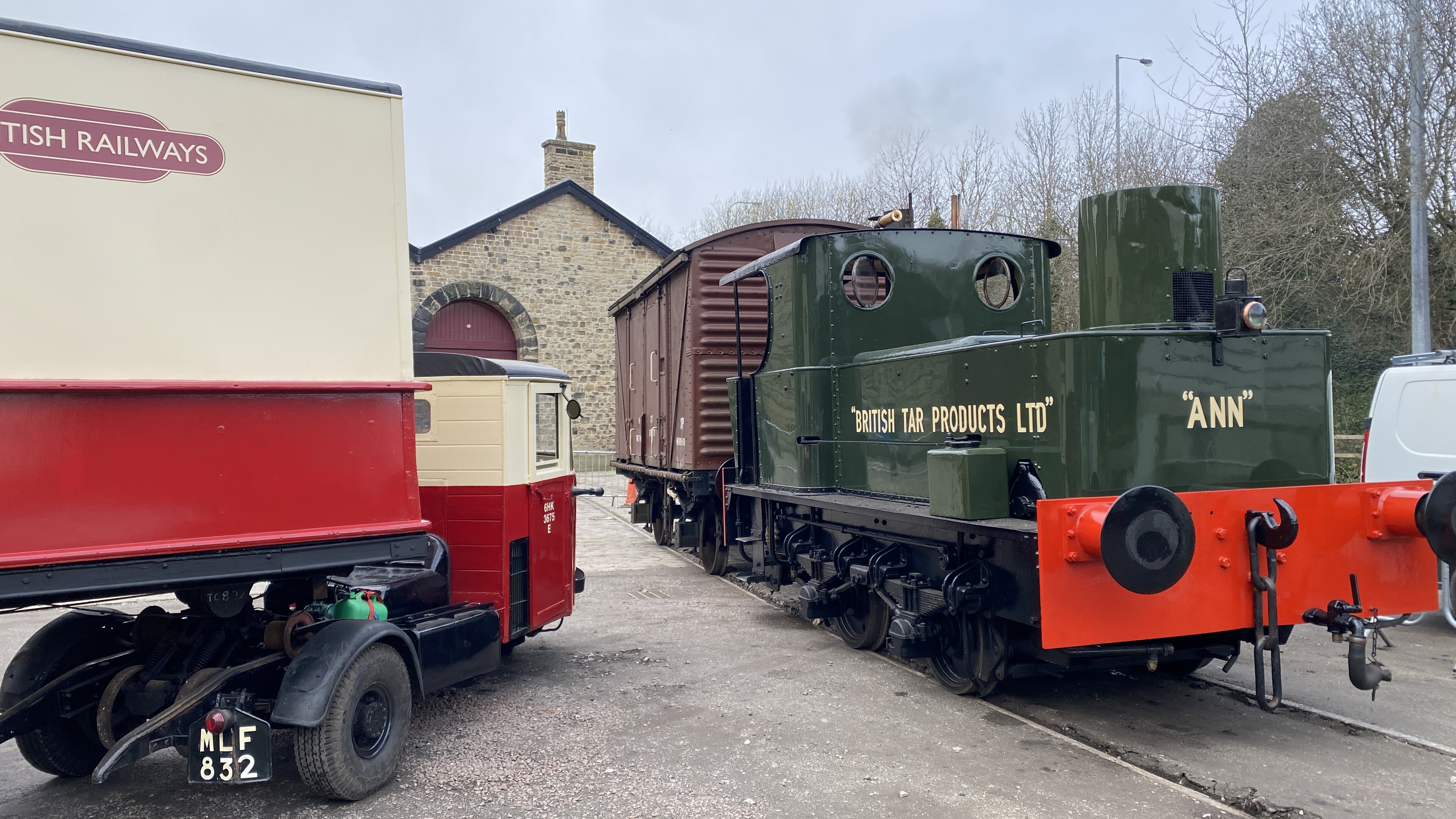
Scammell Scarab next to Ann

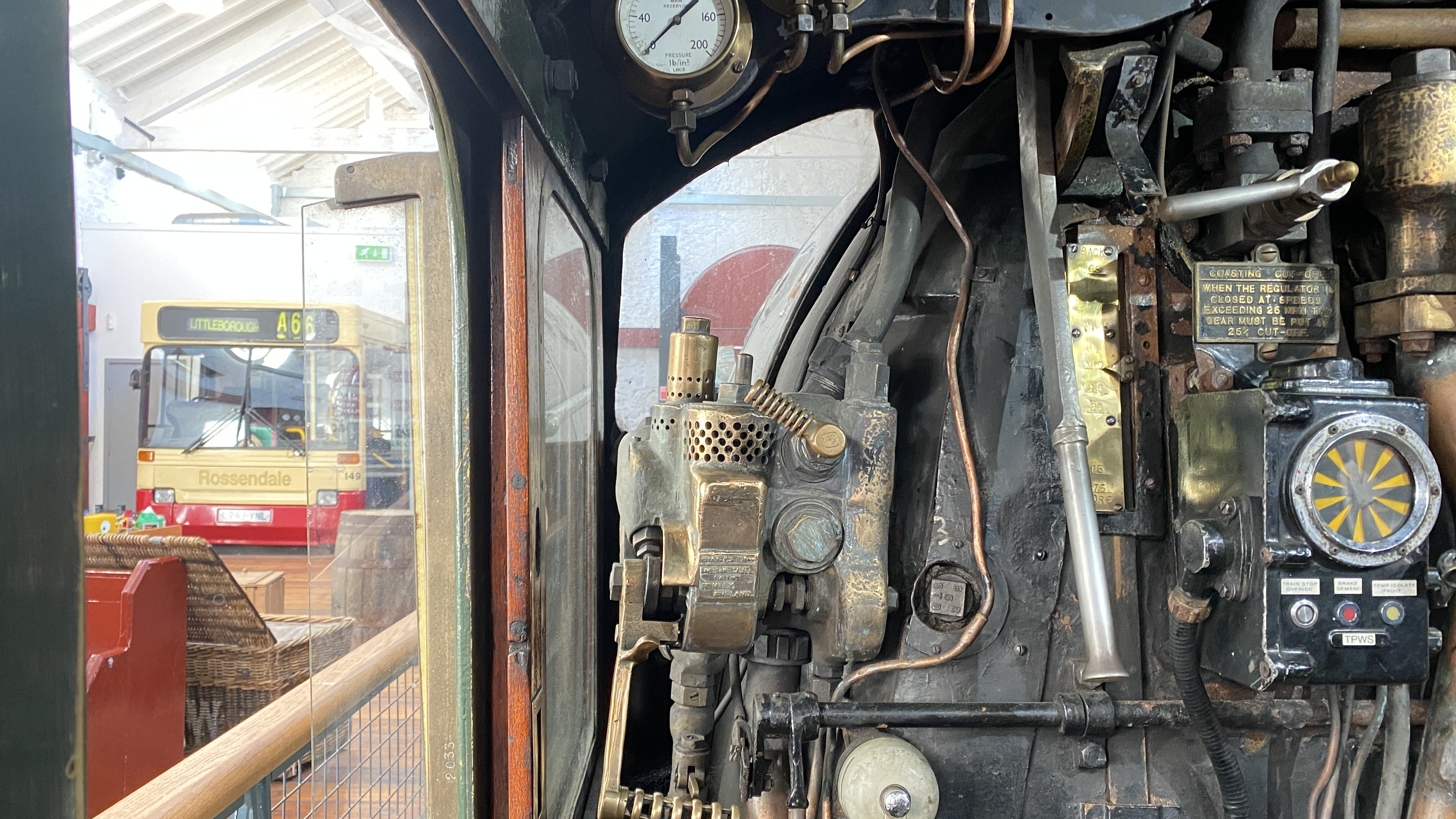
Footplate of "Union of South Africa"

== See also ==
- Listed buildings in Bury
