= List of Shanghai Jiao Tong University alumni =

This is a list of notable alumni of Jiaotong University before 1955 (simplified Chinese: 交通大学; traditional Chinese: 交通大學) and Shanghai Jiao Tong University (SJTU) after 1955.

== Government and politics ==
Name	Chinese	Graduated in	Profile
Cai E	蔡锷	1898	famous general, founder of the Republican Protection Army against Yuan Shikai
Huang Yanpei	黃炎培	1902	politician, industrialist, educator, and one of the founding pioneers of the China Democratic League
Shao Lizi	邵力子	1905	politician, educator, former president of Shanghai University and teacher of Chinese literature in Fudan University
Chen Yibai	陈一白	1922	Minister of Department of Communications in the government of Republic of China
Lu Dingyi	陆定一	1926	politician, former head of Propaganda Department
Wang Daohan	汪道涵	1933	former mayor of Shanghai, paramount politician who held the famous Wang-Koo summits together with Koo Chen-fu
Jiang Zemin	江泽民	1947	politician, former CPC General Secretary, President of China and Chairman of the Central Military Commission
Ding Guangen	丁关根	1951	politician, former Minister of Railways, Head of Propaganda Department
Chen Minzhang	陈敏章	1955	former Minister of Health, President of Red Cross Society of China, President of Chinese Medical Association
Ye Liansong	叶连松	1960	politician, former governor of Hebei Province
Chen Mingyi	陈明义	1962	politician, Secretary of Party Committee of Fujian Province
Wan Xueyuan	万学远	1964	former governor of Zhejiang Province, Vice Minister of Personnel of P.R. China
Yan Junqi	严隽琪	1967	politician, chairperson of China Association of Promoting Democracy
Chen Zhu	陈竺	1981	Minister of Health of P.R. China

== Natural sciences and mathematics ==
Name	Chinese name	Graduated in/ Served on faculty during	Profile	Academicianship
Qian Xuesen	钱学森	1934	missile and space program chief scientist, Two-Bombs-One-Satellite medalist, National Exceptional Contribution Scientist awardee (only one in history so far); Co-founder of Jet Propulsion Laboratory	Member of the Chinese Academy of Sciences, Member of the Chinese Academy of Engineering
Wu Wenjun	吴文俊	1940	mathematician, State Preeminent Science and Technology Award winner, Shaw Prize winner	Member of the Chinese Academy of Sciences, Fellow of the TWAS
Xu Guangxian	徐光宪	1944	chemist, State Preeminent Science and Technology Award winner	Member of the Chinese Academy of Sciences
Hu Hesheng	胡和生	1945–1948	mathematician	Member of the Chinese Academy of Sciences
Wu Youxun/ Y.H. Woo	吴有训	1949	physicist; educator	Member of the Chinese Academy of Sciences, Member of the German Academy of Sciences Leopoldina
He Zuoxiu	何祚庥	1949	physicist	Member of the Chinese Academy of Sciences
Gu Min/ Min Gu	顾敏	1982	scientist in micro-photonics	Fellow of Australian Academy of Science, Fellow of the Australian Academy of Technological Sciences and Engineering
Zhang Jie	张杰	2006–present	physicist in x-ray lasers, high field and laser-plasma physics	Member of the Chinese Academy of Sciences, Member of the German Academy of Sciences Leopoldina, International Fellow of the Royal Academy of Engineering, Fellow of the TWAS
Yao Tongbin	zh:姚桐斌	1945	missile and space program scientist, Two-Bombs-One-Satellite medalist	
Jun Ye	叶军	1989	physicist	Member of the US National Academy of Sciences Member of the Chinese Academy of Sciences

Information science, system science and electrical engineering

English name	Chinese name	Graduated in/ Served on faculty during	Profile	Academicianship
Zhu Wuhua	朱物华	1923/1945-1998	scientist in electronics; educator	Member of the Chinese Academy of Sciences
Cai Jintao	蔡金涛	1930	scientist in electronics	Member of the Chinese Academy of Sciences
Chu Yinghuang	褚应璜	1931	specialist in power engineering	Member of the Chinese Academy of Sciences
Qian Zhonghan	钱钟韩	1933	scientist in power engineering	Member of the Chinese Academy of Sciences
Zhang Zhongjun/ T.T. Chang	张仲俊	1934/1940-1995	scientist in electrical systems and automatic control	Member of the Chinese Academy of Sciences
Wang An/ An Wang	王安	1940	computer scientist and inventor, founder of Wang Laboratories	Member of the U.S. National Academy of Engineering
Zhou Wenjun/ Wen Tsing Chow	周文俊	1940	missile guidance scientist and digital computer pioneer	
Cao Jianyou	曹建猷	1940	scientist in electrical power systems	Member of the Chinese Academy of Sciences
Yang Jiachi	杨嘉墀	1941	scientist in automatic control, satellite control specialist, Two-Bombs-One-Satellite medalist	Member of the Chinese Academy of Sciences
Tian Binggeng/ Ping King Tien	田炳耕	1941	scientist in microwave electronics, optical electronics and materials science	Member of the U.S. National Academy of Sciences, Member of the U.S. National Academy of Engineering, Foreign Member of the Chinese Academy of Engineering, Academician of the Academia Sinica, Fellow of the TWAS
Li Tianhe/ Thomas H. Lee	李天和	1946	specialist in power engineering	Member of the U.S. National Academy of Engineering, Foreign Member of the Chinese Academy of Engineering
Tong Zhipeng	童志鵬	1946	scientist in telecommunications	Member of the Chinese Academy of Engineering
Gu Yuxiu/ Y.H. Ku	顾毓琇	1945-1947 (as faculty)	scientist in electrical machinery, system and control; educator; writer, playwright and poet	
Ge Shouren/ Ernest S. Kuh	葛守仁	1945-1947 (as student)	scientist in circuit theory and electronic design automation	Member of the U.S. National Academy of Engineering, Foreign Member of the Chinese Academy of Sciences, Academician of the Academia Sinica
Xia Peisu	夏培肃	1947	computer scientist	Member of the Chinese Academy of Sciences
Wang Geng	汪耕	1949	specialist in electrical power transmission	Member of the Chinese Academy of Sciences
Chen Jingxiong	陈敬熊	1950	scientist in electromagnetics, microwave and antennas	Member of the Chinese Academy of Engineering
Kuang Dingbo	匡定波	1952	scientist in infrared and remote sensing	Member of the Chinese Academy of Sciences
Li Lemin	李乐民	1952	scientist in telecommunications	Member of the Chinese Academy of Engineering
Tang Renyuan	唐任远	1952	scientist in electric motor engineering	Member of the Chinese Academy of Engineering
Zhu Yinghao	朱英浩	1952	scientist in electric power transformers	Member of the Chinese Academy of Engineering
Zhao Zisen	赵梓森	1953	specialist in telecommunications	Member of the Chinese Academy of Engineering
Chen Junliang	陈俊亮	1955	scientist in telecommunications	Member of the Chinese Academy of Sciences, Member of the Chinese Academy of Engineering
Jiang Xinsong	蒋新松	1956	scientist in robotics and automation	Member of the Chinese Academy of Engineering
Yao Xi	姚熹	1957	scientist in materials and devices	Member of the Chinese Academy of Sciences, Foreign Associate of U.S. National Academy of Engineering
Chen Yazhu	陈亚珠	1962	scientist in power electronics and biomedical engineering	Member of the Chinese Academy of Engineering
Teng Shanghua (Shang-Hua Teng)	滕尚华	1985	computer scientist, Gödel Prize winner	

== Engineering and technological sciences ==
- Chow Wen Tsing/Wen Tsing Chow (周文俊) - missile guidance scientist and digital computer pioneer
- Qian Xuesen (钱学森) - missile and space program chief scientist, Two-Bombs-One-Satellite medalist, National Exceptional Contribution Scientist awardee
- Xu Xueyan (许学彦) - famous ship designer
- Yang Jiachi (杨嘉墀) - space program scientist, specialist of automatic control, Two-Bombs-One-Satellite medalist
- Zhang Guangdou (张光斗) - world-renowned specialist in hydraulic engineering
- James S. C. Chao (趙錫成) - the founder of the Foremost Group, a New York-based shipping, trading, and finance enterprise.

== Life sciences and medicine ==
- Chen Zhu (陈竺) - hematologist, molecular biologist, and current minister of Ministry of Health
- Luc Montagnier (吕克·蒙塔尼耶) - Nobel Prize laureate for the discovery of HIV
- Wang Zhenyi/Zhen-yi Wang (王振义) - hematologist, State Preeminent Science and Technology Award winner
- Harry Warner - Fictional New Zealand surgeon and doctor of medical drama Shortland Street

== Humanities and social sciences ==
- Cai Yuanpei (蔡元培) - famous educator, esperantist and the president of Peking University
- Hong Yi (李叔同) - master painter, musician, dramatist, calligrapher, seal cutter, poet, and Buddhist monk
- Lisa Lu (卢燕) - Chinese-American actress and documentary producer
- Mao Yushi (茅于轼) - economist
- Wu Youxun (吴有训) - educator

== Business ==
- Jiang Jianqing (姜建清) - president and chairman of the Industrial and Commercial Bank of China
- Mao Daolin (茅道林) - CEO of Sina
- Wang Shizhen (王世帧) - founder of China Merchants Bank
- Yang Yuanqing (杨元庆) - chairman of the Lenovo Group Limited
- Zhu Jun (朱骏) - founder of The9 Limited, chairman of football club Shanghai Shenhua F.C.
- Beini Da (达贝妮) - founder of SohoNow, chairman of Eurasian Science Village and Children's Museum China.
- Neil Shen (沈南鹏) - founding managing partner, Sequoia Capital China
- Xu Xinlu (徐新六) a.k.a. Singloh Hsu - banker and general manager of the National Commercial Bank, attended Nanyang Public School

== Sports ==
- Ding Junhui (丁俊晖) - Professional snooker player
- Wang Liqin (王励勤) - Professional table tennis player, World and Olympic multi medalist, one of best players in history
- Liu Guoliang (刘国梁) - Olympic gold medalist, chief manager of China's table tennis national team
- Yao Ming (姚明) - Professional basketball player
- Sui Lu (眭禄) - Olympic Silver Medalist gymnast
- Xu Jiayu (徐嘉余) - Professional backstroke swimmer, Olympic Silver Medalist and World multi medalist
- Fan Zhendong (樊振东) - Professional table tennis player, World multi medalist, one of best players in history
