= Public transport bus service =

Road transport using buses

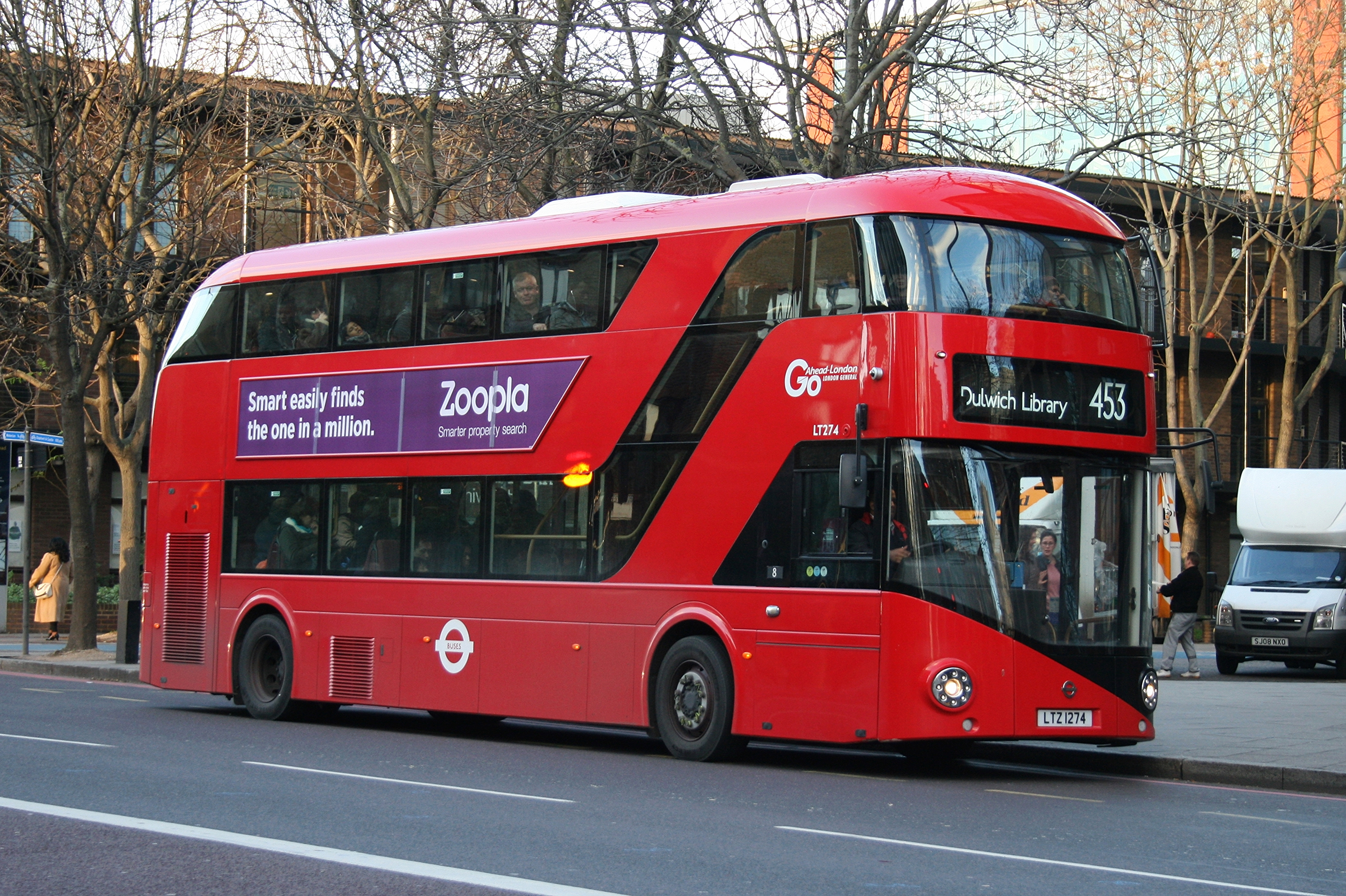
New Routemaster operating in London

Public transport bus services are generally based on regular operation of transit buses along a route calling at agreed bus stops according to a published public transport timetable.

== History of buses ==
=== Origins ===
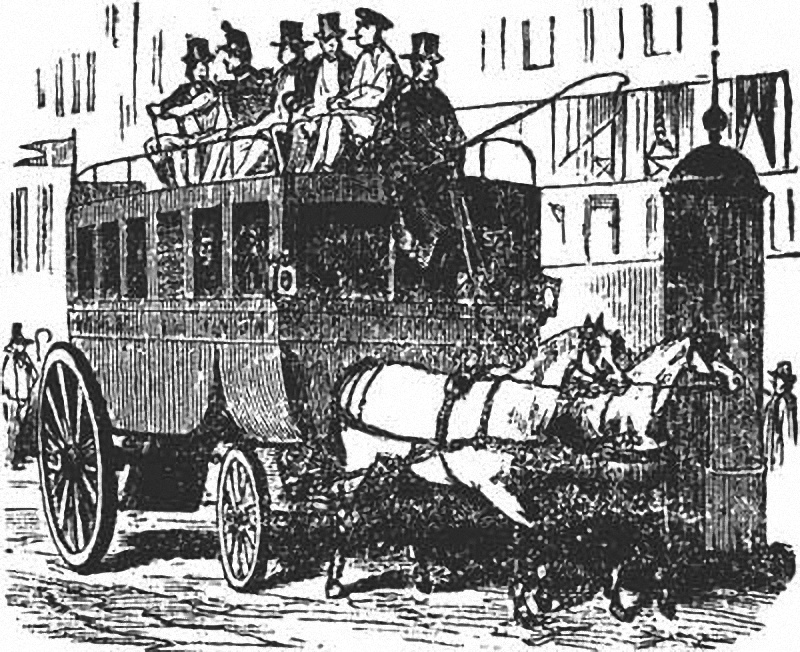
Parisian Omnibus, late nineteenth century

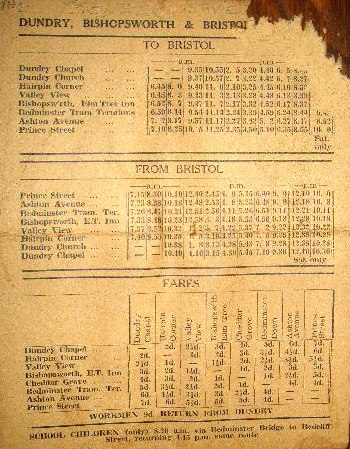
A public transport timetable for bus services in England in the 1940s and 1950s

While there are indications of experiments with public transport in Paris as early as 1662, there is evidence of a scheduled "bus route" from Market Street in Manchester to Pendleton in Salford UK, started by John Greenwood in 1824.

Another claim for the first public transport system for general use originated in Nantes, France, in 1826. Stanislas Baudry, a retired army officer who had built public baths using the surplus heat from his flour mill on the city's edge, set up a short route between the center of town and his baths. The service started on the Place du Commerce, outside the hat shop of a M. Omnès, who displayed the motto Omnès Omnibus (Latin for "everything for everybody" or "all for all") on his shopfront. When Baudry discovered that passengers were just as interested in getting off at intermediate points as in patronizing his baths, he changed the route's focus. His new voiture omnibus ("carriage for all") combined the functions of the hired hackney carriage with a stagecoach that travelled a predetermined route from inn to inn, carrying passengers and mail. His omnibus had wooden benches that ran down the sides of the vehicle; Passengers entered from the rear.

In 1828, Baudry went to Paris, where he founded a company under the name Entreprise générale des omnibus de Paris, while his son Edmond Baudry founded two similar companies in Bordeaux and in Lyon.

A London newspaper reported on July 4, 1829, that "the new vehicle, called the omnibus, commenced running this morning from Paddington to the City", operated by George Shillibeer.

The first omnibus service in New York began in 1829, when Abraham Brower, an entrepreneur who had organized volunteer fire companies, established a route along Broadway starting at Bowling Green. Other American cities soon followed suit: Philadelphia in 1831, Boston in 1835 and Baltimore in 1844. In most cases, the city governments granted a private company—generally a small stableman already in the livery or freight-hauling business—an exclusive franchise to operate public coaches along a specified route. In return, the company agreed to maintain certain minimum levels of service.

In 1832, the New York omnibus had a rival when the first trams, or streetcars started operation along Bowery, which offered an excellent improvement in amenity of riding on smooth iron rails rather than clattering over granite setts, called "Belgian blocks". The streetcars were financed by John Mason, a wealthy banker, and built by an Irish-American contractor, John Stephenson. The Fifth Avenue Coach Company introduced electric buses to Fifth Avenue in New York in 1898.

In 1831, New Yorker Washington Irving remarked of Britain's Reform Act (finally passed in 1832): "The great reform omnibus moves but slowly." Steam buses emerged in the 1830s as competition to the horse-drawn buses.

The omnibus extended the reach of the emerging cities. The walk from the former village of Paddington to the business heart of London in the City was a long one, even for a young man in good condition. The omnibus thus offered the suburbs more access to the inner city. The omnibus encouraged urbanization. Socially, the omnibus put city-dwellers, even if for only half an hour, into previously-unheard-of physical intimacy with strangers, squeezing them together knee-to-knee. Only the very poor remained excluded. A new division in urban society now came to the fore, dividing those who kept carriages from those who did not. The idea of the "carriage trade", the folk who never set foot in the streets, who had goods brought out from the shops for their appraisal, has its origins in the omnibus crush.

=== Motorbus ===
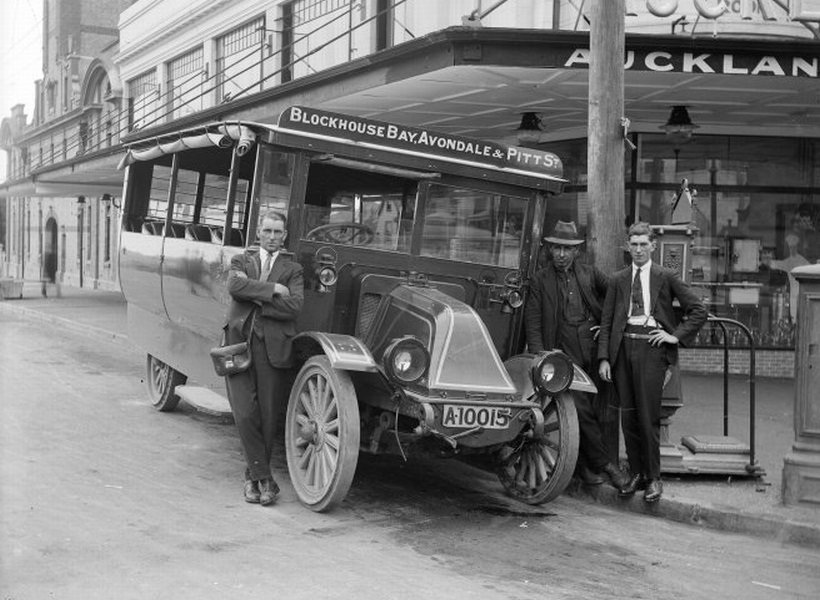
Public transport bus in Auckland, New Zealand in the 1920s

John D. Hertz founded the Yellow Coach Manufacturing Company in 1923 and then sold a majority of shares to General Motors in 1925.

From the 1920s, General Motors and others started buying up streetcar systems across the United States with a view to replacing them with buses in what became known as the Great American Streetcar Scandal. This was accompanied by a continuing series of technical improvements: pneumatic "balloon" tires during the early 1920s, monocoque body construction in 1931, automatic transmission in 1936, diesel engines in 1936, 50+ passengers in 1948, and air suspension in 1953.

The arrest of Rosa Parks in 1955 for not giving up her seat to a white man on a public bus is considered one of the catalysts of the Civil Rights Movement within the United States.

== Types of services ==
The names of different types of bus services vary according to local tradition or marketing, although services can be classified into basic types based on route length, frequency, the purpose of use and type of bus used.

=== Urban transport or regional ===
- Transit bus is the most common type of public transport bus service and is used to transport large numbers of people in urban areas, or to and from the suburbs to population centres. These buses normally run on fixed routes within an urban area.
- Park and ride bus services are designed to provide an onward passenger journey from a parking lot. These may be branded as shuttle or express services, or part of the standard bus network.
- Share taxi bus services are designed to run as flexible high capacity vehicles usually using minibuses to any point of a person's wish instead of a fixed route. Most common examples of share taxis include public light buses in Hong Kong where the red topped ones act as a share taxi as opposed to green topped ones which are on fixed routes.
- Feeder bus services are designed to pick up passengers in a certain locality and take them to a transfer point where they make an onward journey on a trunk service. This can be another bus, or a rail-based service such as a tram, rapid transit or train. Feeder buses may act as part of a wider local network, or a regional coach network.
- Bus rapid transit (BRT) is the application of a range of infrastructure and marketing measures to produce public transport bus services that approach the operating characteristics and capacity of rapid transit systems.
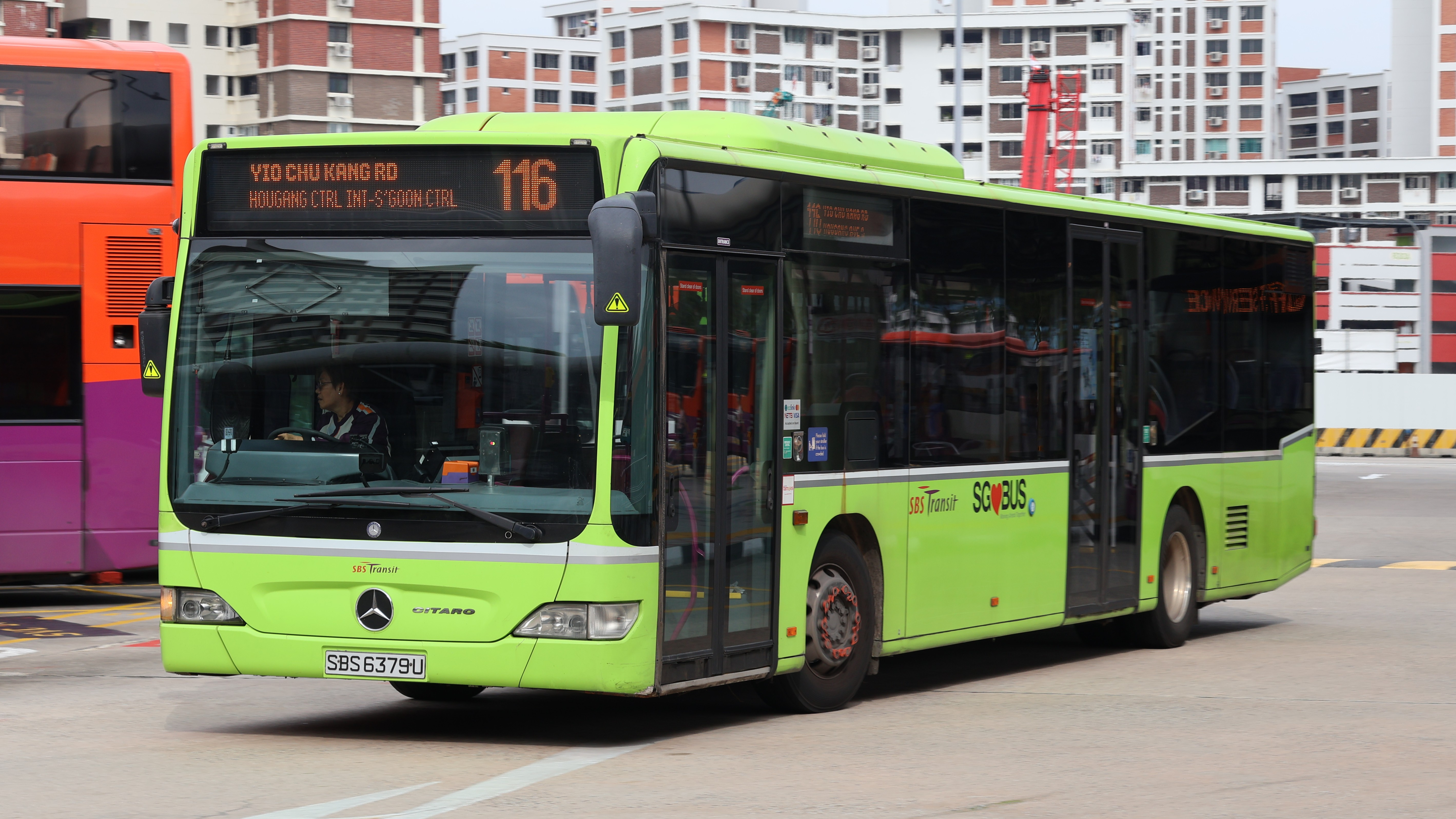
Transit bus

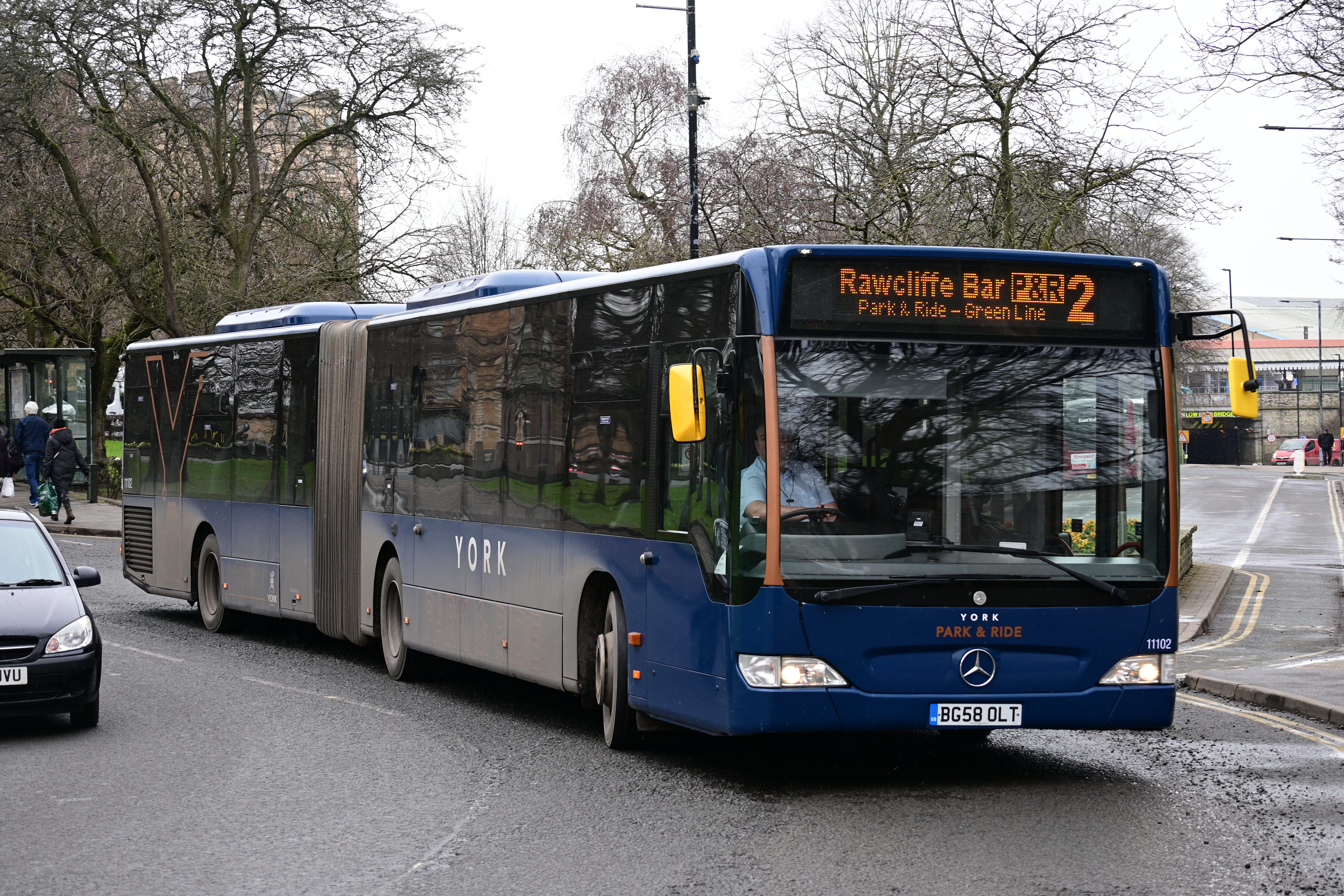
Park and ride

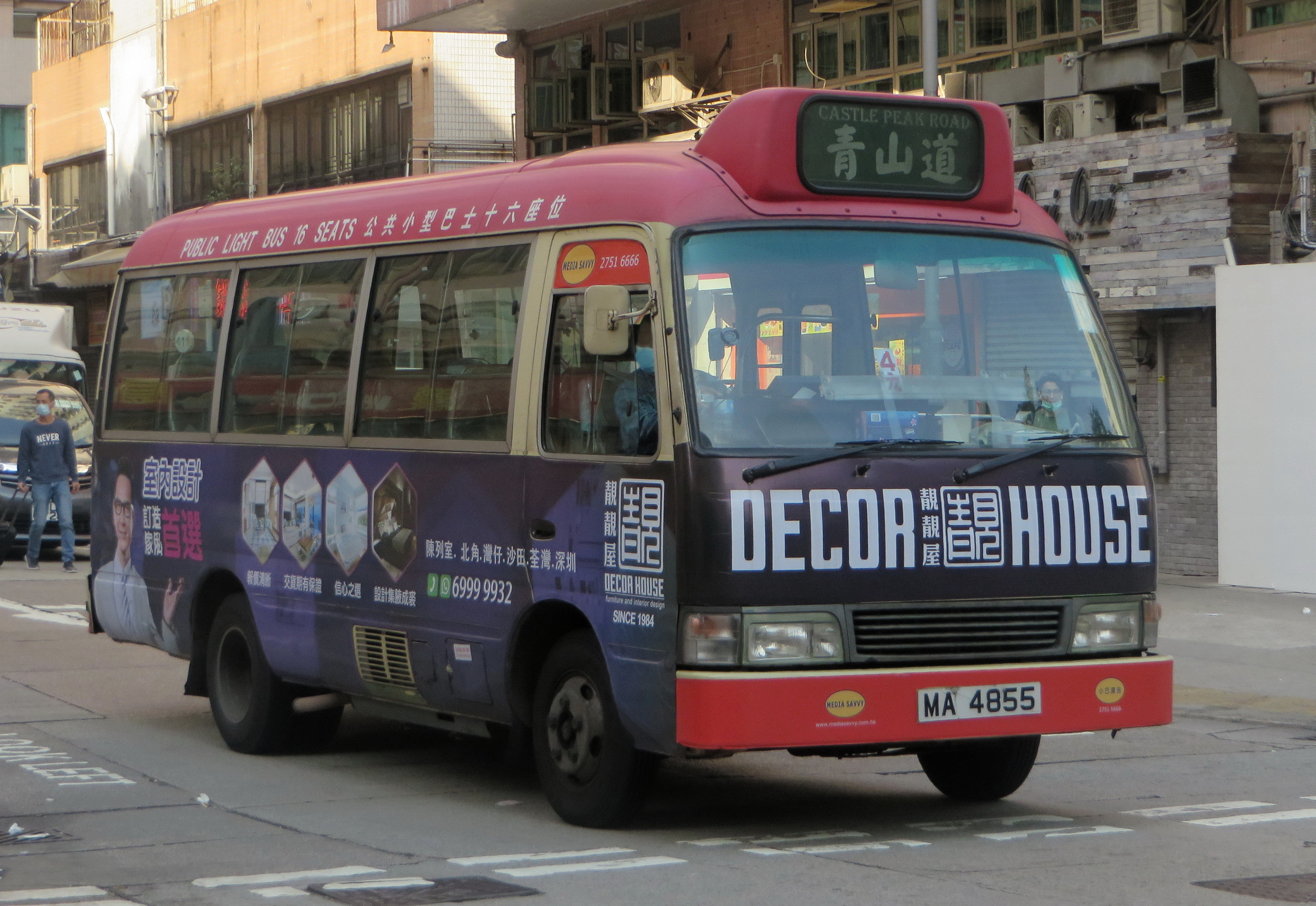
Share taxi bus service

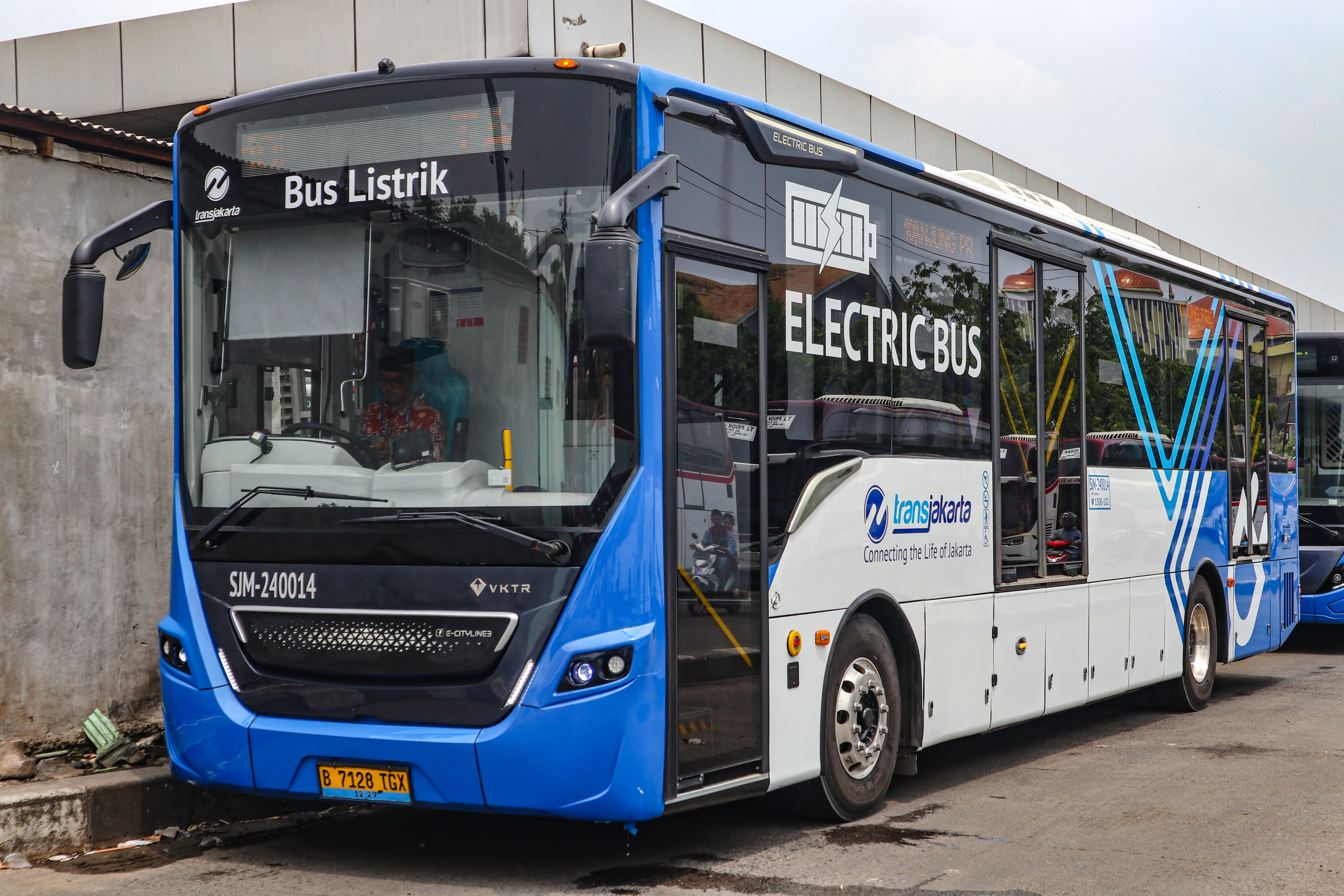
Bus rapid transit

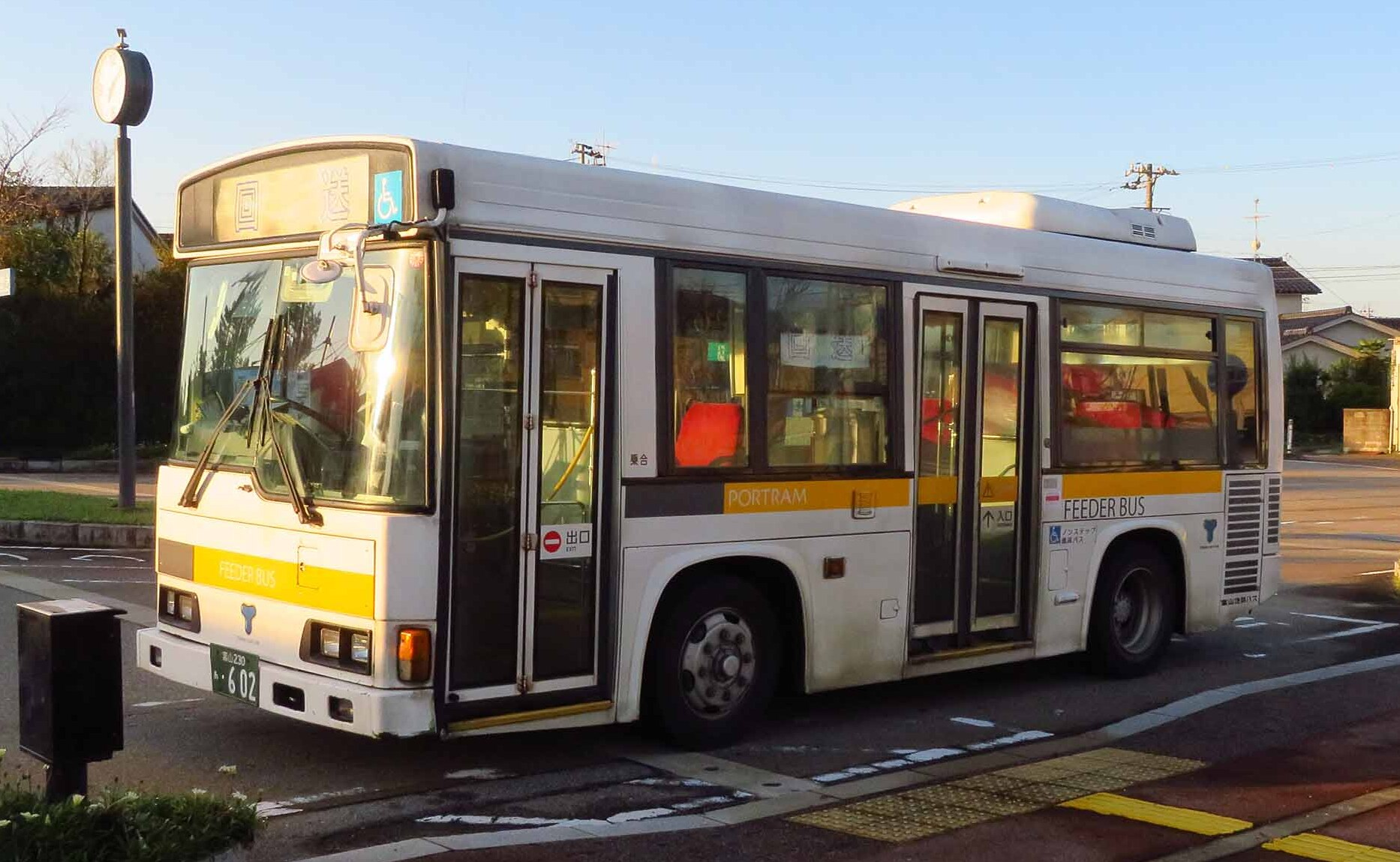
Feeder bus service

==== Express bus service ====
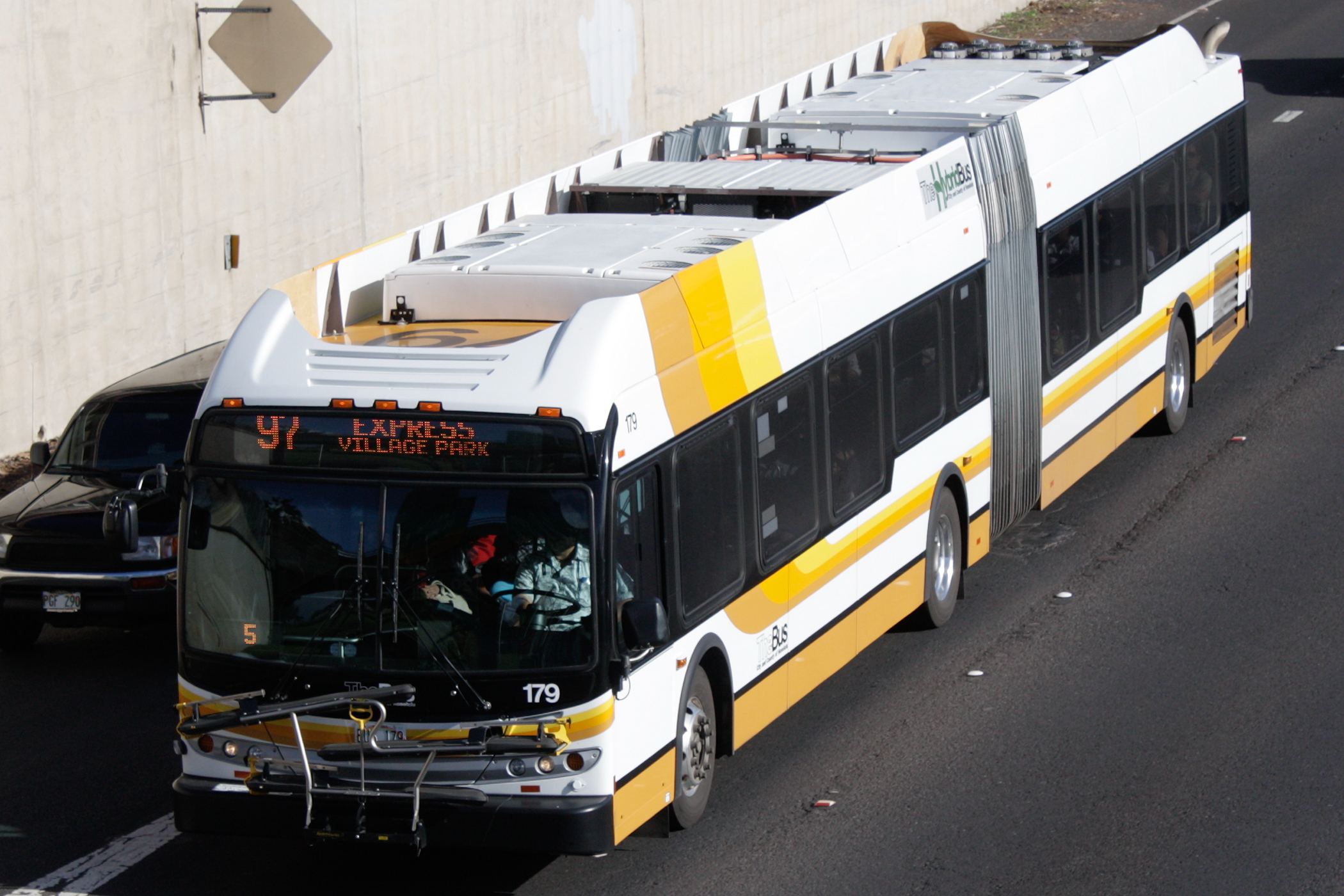
A TheBus with destination marquee indicating "Express" service to Village Park on the H-1 Freeway.

An express bus service (also known as express commuter service, commuter bus service, or suburban bus service) is a fixed-route bus service that is intended to run faster than normal bus services between the same two commuter or destination points, typically on longer-distance routes.

Express buses operate on a faster schedule by not making as many stops as normal bus services and often taking quicker routes, such as along freeways, or by using dedicated lanes or roadways. Express buses may also operate out of park and rides, in some cases only during rush hour in the peak direction.

Fares on express bus services may be higher than normal parallel services. Many express buses act as precursors to bus rapid transit lines and employ a proof-of-payment scheme, requiring passengers to purchase tickets before boarding the bus, speeding up the service. These services may also use suburban coaches that feature amenities like comfortable seating and wireless Internet service, particularly on routes that travel long distances at higher speeds without stopping.

In many cases, an express bus service is identified by a letter before or after the regular route number. For example, in Sydney, the letters L (as in L90), E (as in E70) and X (as in 610X or X84). L indicates that the bus runs along the normal route, while E and X indicate that the bus runs along a more direct route. In New York City, express buses operate using coaches from Motor Coach Industries and Prevost Car, and all except the BxM4 operate along highways, sometimes for a large portion of the route. For example, the QM8, QM5 and QM2 Super Expresses, the SIM26, SIM22, SIM25, BxM11 and X38 all operate on highways for most of their route. Many transit systems may also use a specific number before or after the regular route number. For example, in Toronto, the number "9" (as in 995) goes before the regular route number to display an express bus service.

=== Long distance transport ===
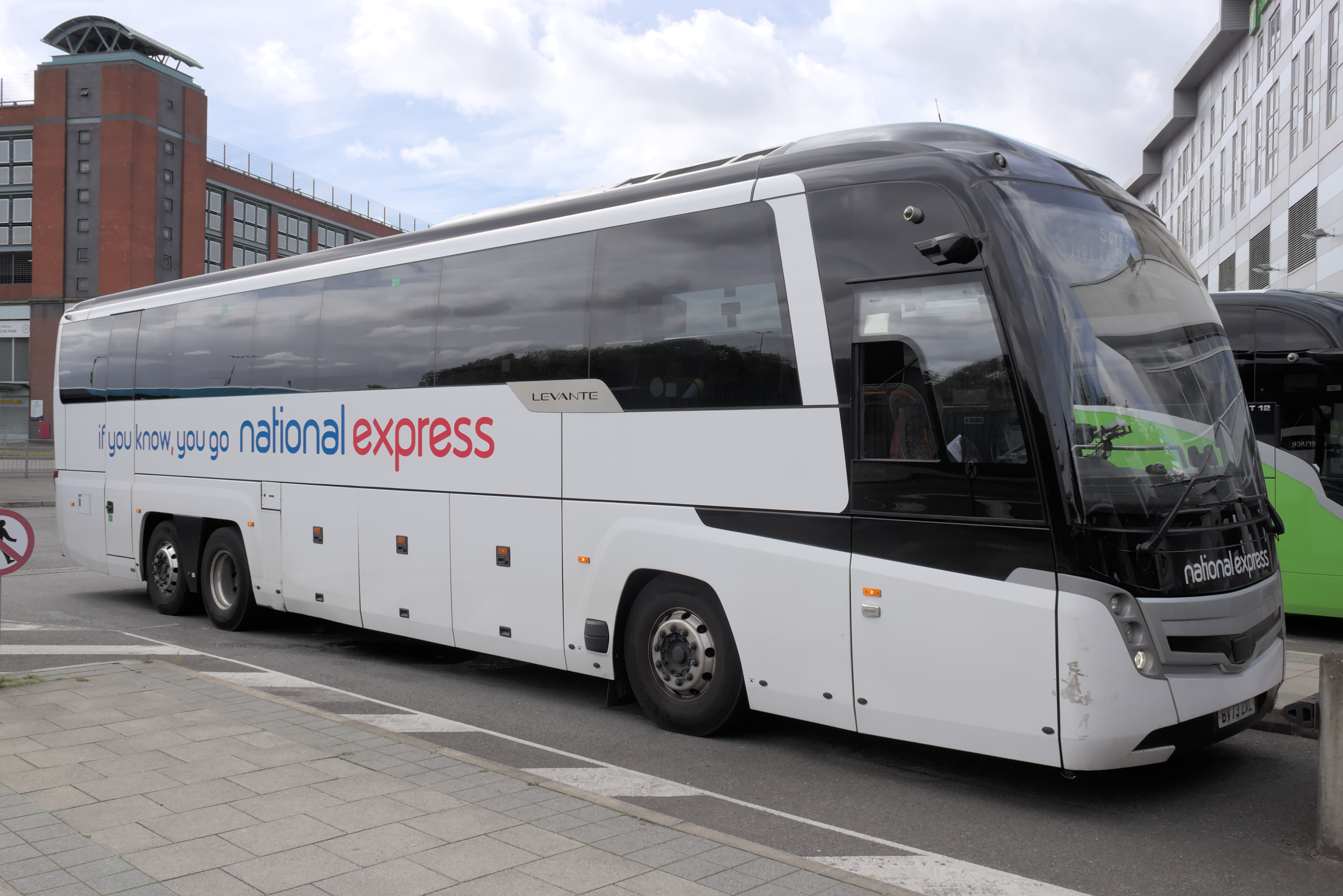
An intercity coach operated by Woods Coaches

Long-distance coach services (US: Intercity bus line) are bus services operated over long distances between cities. These services can form the mainstay of the travel network in countries with poor railway infrastructure. Different coach operators may band together on a franchise or connecting basis to offer a branded network that covers large distances, such as Trailways and National Express. These networks can even operate internationally, such as Eurolines of Europe. Interurban bus services are primarily aimed at linking together one or more urban centres, and as such are often run as express services while travelling in the intermediate rural areas, or even only call at two terminal points as a long distance shuttle service. Some interurban services may be operated as high specification luxury services, using coaches, in order to compete with railways, or link areas not rail connected. Interurban services may often terminate in central bus stations rather than on street stops. Other interurban services may specifically call at intermediate villages and may use slower transit buses or dual purpose buses.

=== Specialist services ===
- School buses transport children to and from school. While many countries and school districts organise their own services, as school buses or charter buses, in some areas school bus services are implemented as special journeys on the normal public timetable, specially timed and routed to arrive and depart in coordination with the school bell. Only the latter is commonly referred to as "public transport".
- Shuttle buses are any type of bus service intended primarily to shuttle passengers between two fixed points. These can be bus or coach operated, but are usually short or medium distance journeys taking less than an hour. Shuttle buses will usually link with other transport hubs, such as airport shuttle buses. A common use of a shuttle bus is in towns or cities with multiple terminal train stations or bus stations, for passenger interconnections. "Shuttle" as a brand name is applied variously across several types of service.
- Post bus services are services that also carry mail, often on rural routes.
- Rail replacement bus services are often chartered by railway companies as alternate means of transport for rail passengers. This can be pre-planned to cover for scheduled track maintenance or other planned closures, or to cover for unplanned closures such as derailments.
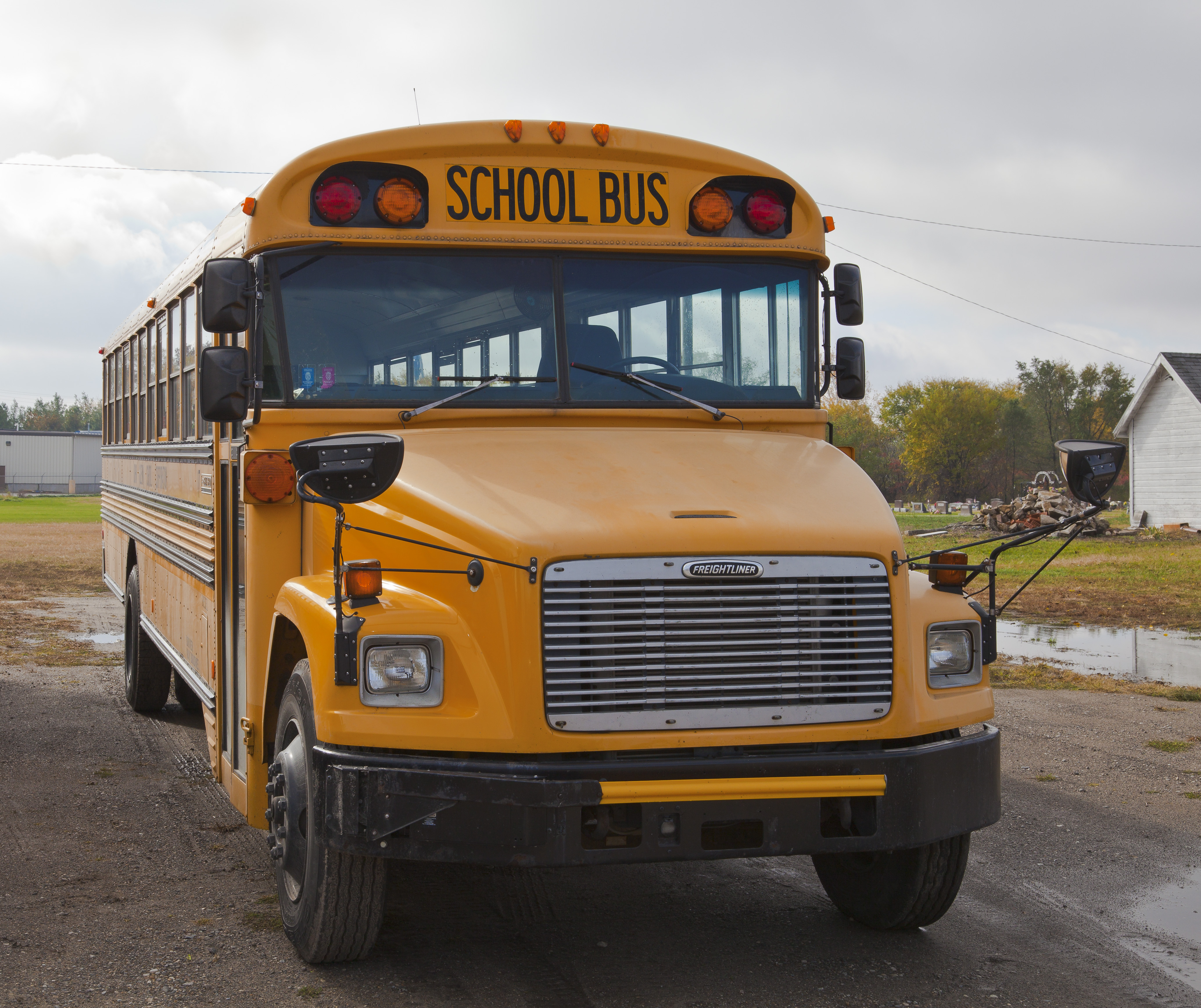
School bus

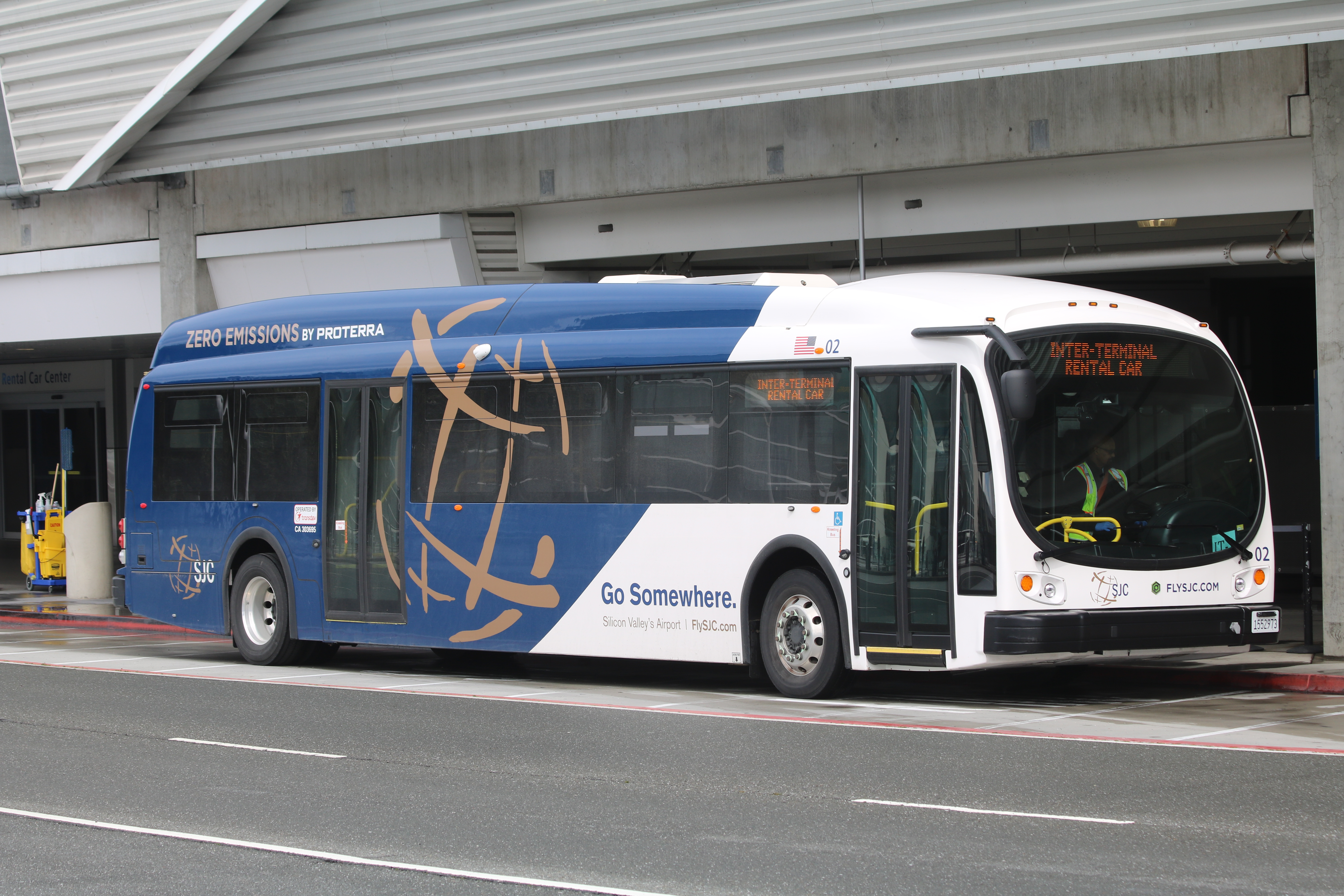
Shuttle bus

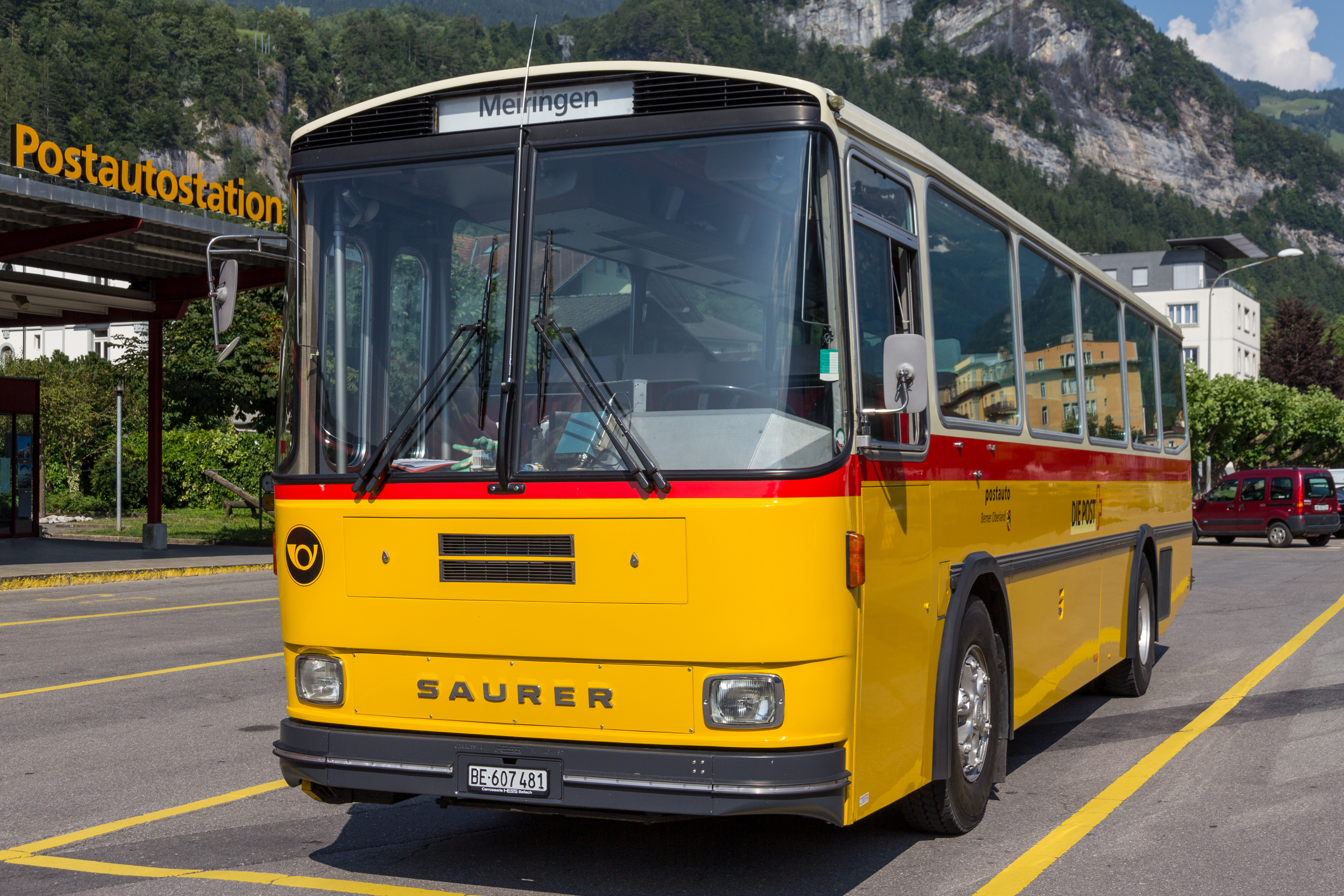
Post bus

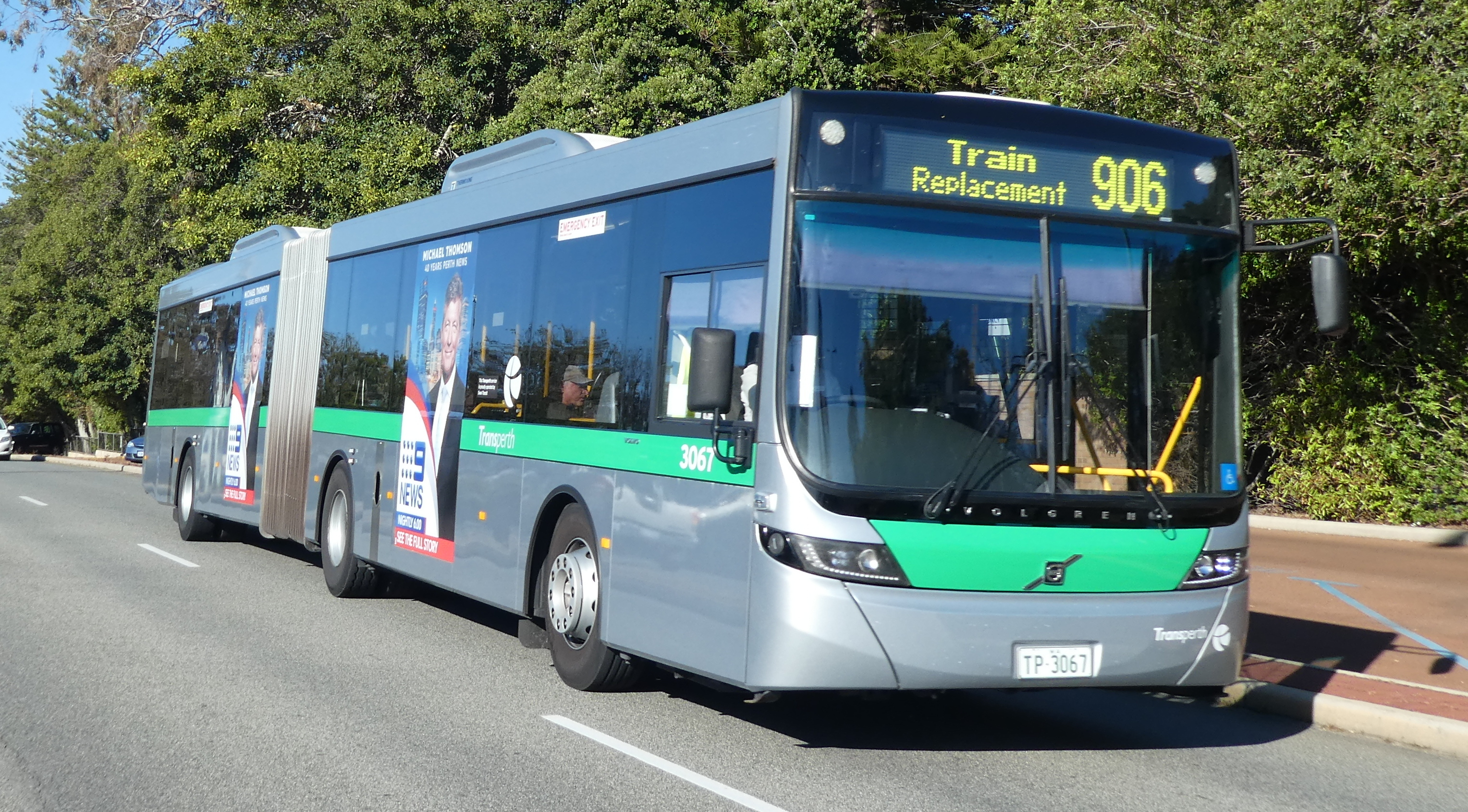
Rail replacement

== Operation ==
=== Scheduling ===
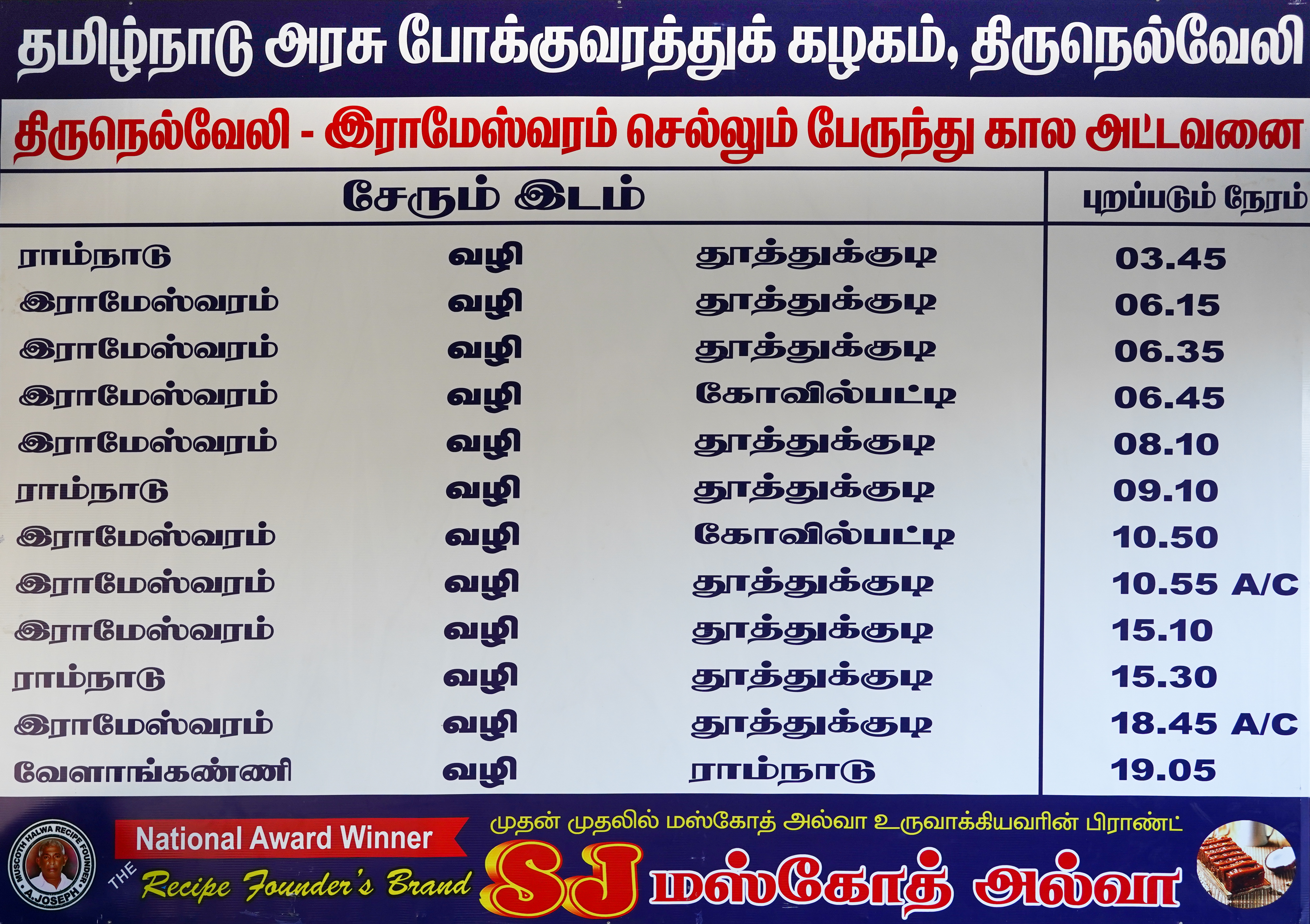
Bus timetable in Tamil Nadu, India.

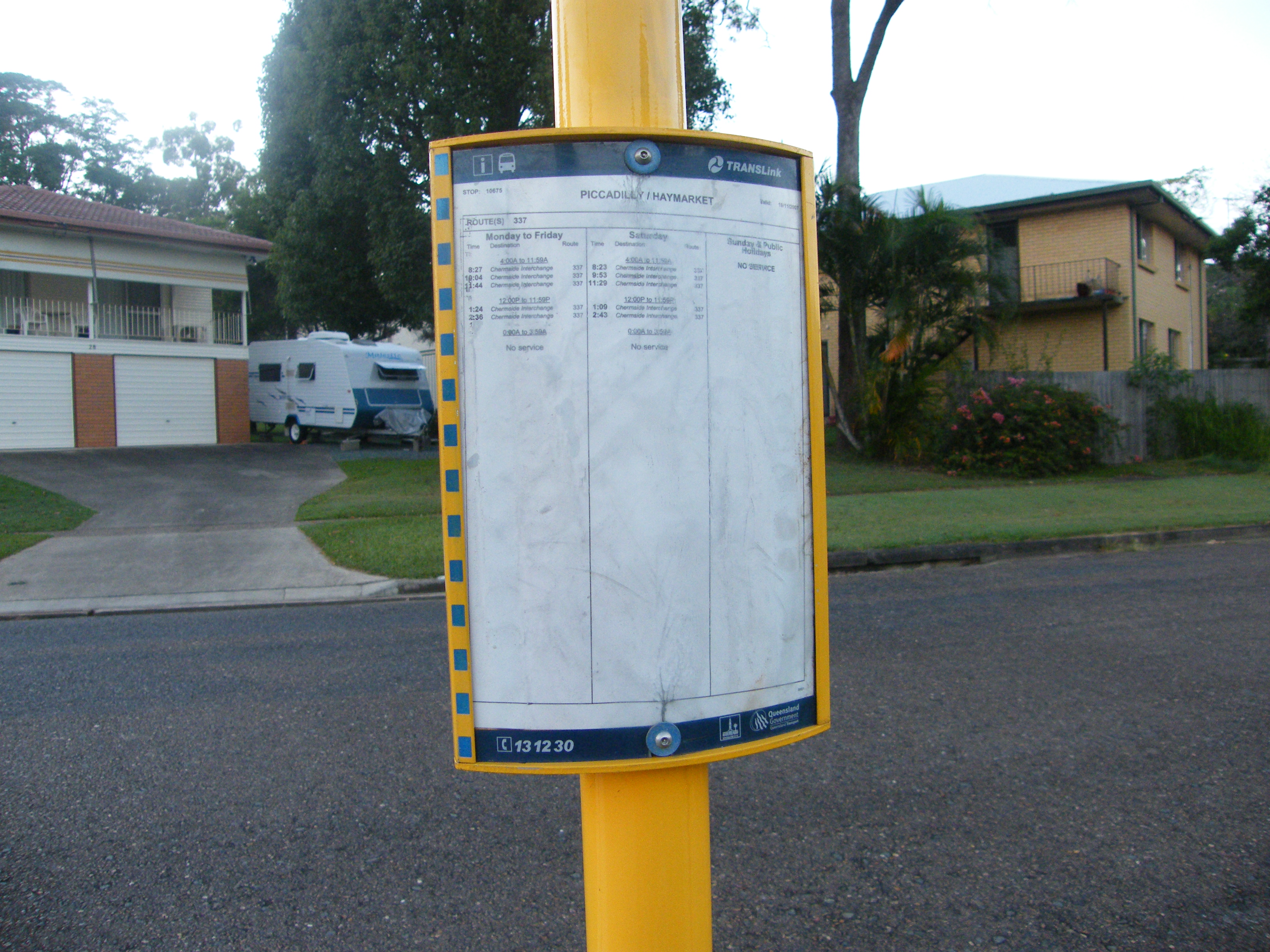
Bus stop with timetable attached

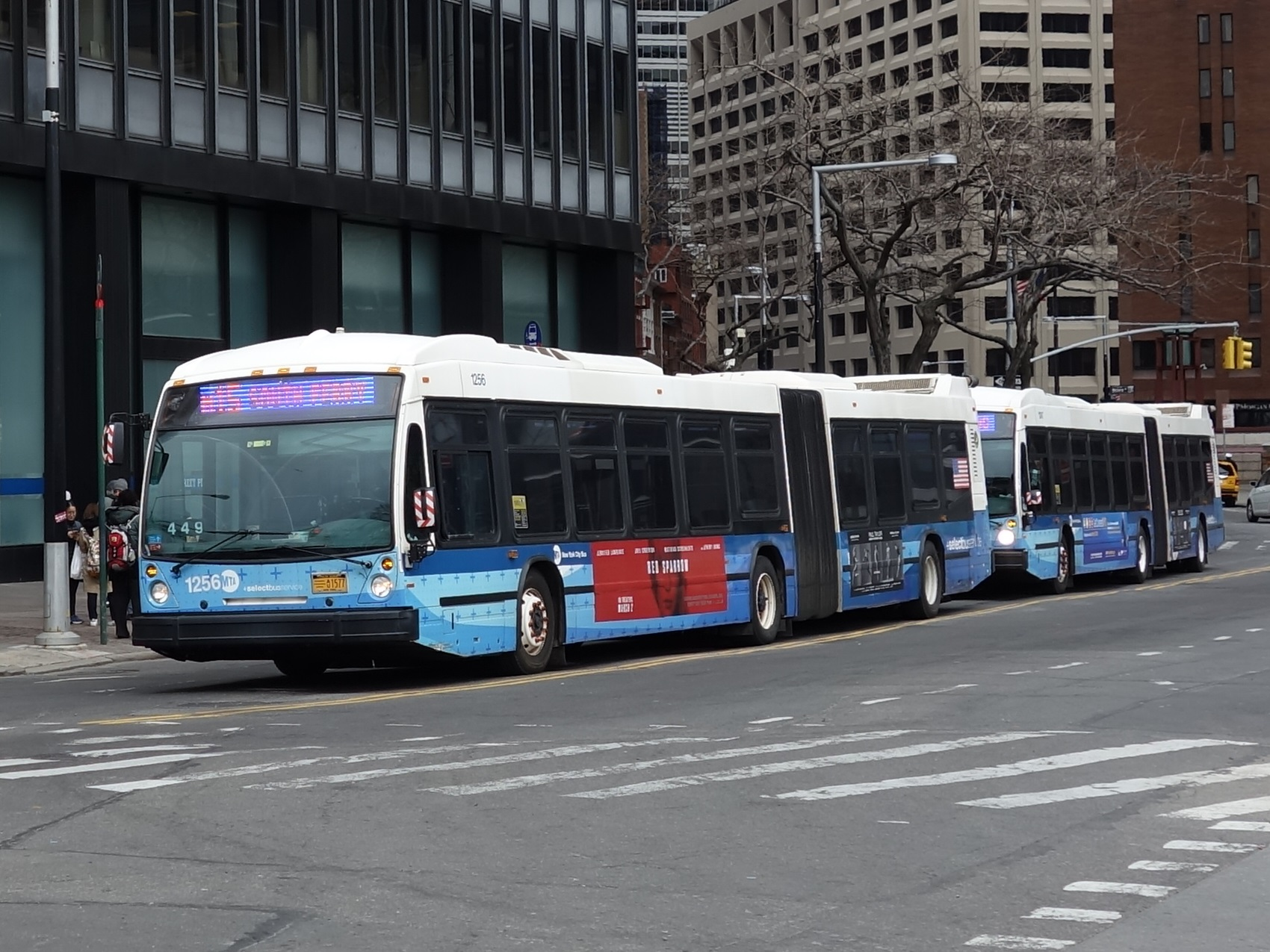
Bus bunching caused by misaligned bus timetables

Many public bus services are run to a specific timetable giving specific times of departure and arrival at waypoints along the route. These are often difficult to maintain in the event of traffic congestion, breakdowns, on/off bus incidents, road blockages or bad weather. Predictable effects such as morning and evening rush hour traffic are often accounted for in timetables using the past experience of the effects, although this then prevents the opportunity for drafting a 'clock face' timetable where the time of a bus is predictable at any time through the day. Predictable short term increases in passenger numbers may be dealt with by providing "duplicate" buses, where two or more buses operate the same slot in the timetable. Unpredictable problems resulting in delays and gaps in the timetabled service may be dealt with by 'turning' a bus early before it reaches it terminus, so that it can fill a gap in the opposite direction, meaning any passengers on the turned bus need to disembark and continue on a following bus. Also, depending on the location of the bus depot, replacement buses may be dispatched from the depot to fill in other gaps, starting the timetable part way along the route.

There is a common cliché that people "wait all day, and then three come along at once", in relation to a phenomenon where evenly timetabled bus services can develop a gap in service followed by buses turning up almost simultaneously. This occurs when the rush hour begins and numbers of passengers at a stop increases, increasing the loading time, and thus delay scheduled service. The following bus then catches up because it begins to be delayed less at stops due to fewer passengers waiting. This is called bus bunching. This is prevented in some cities such as Berlin by assigning every stop arrival times where scheduled buses should arrive no earlier than specified.

Some services may have no specific departure times, the timetable giving the frequency of service on a route at particular phases of the day. This may be specified with departure times, but the over-riding factor is ensuring the regularity of buses arriving at stops. These are often the more frequent services, up to the busiest bus rapid transit schemes. For headway-based schemes, problems can be managed by changing speed, delaying at stops and leap-frogging a bus boarding at a stop.

Services may be strictly regulated in terms of level of adherence to timetables, and how often timetables may be changed. Operators and authorities may employ on-street bus inspectors to monitor adherence in real time. Service operators often have a control room, or in the case of large operations, route controllers, who can monitor the level of service on routes and can take remedial action if problems occur. This was made easier with the technological advances of two way radio contact with drivers, and vehicle tracking systems.

Urban land-use planning policies are essential for the success of bus transit systems, particularly as mass transit is not feasible in low-density communities. Transportation planners estimate that to support local bus service every thirty minutes, there must be a residential housing density of seven dwelling units per acre.

=== Fixed infrastructure ===
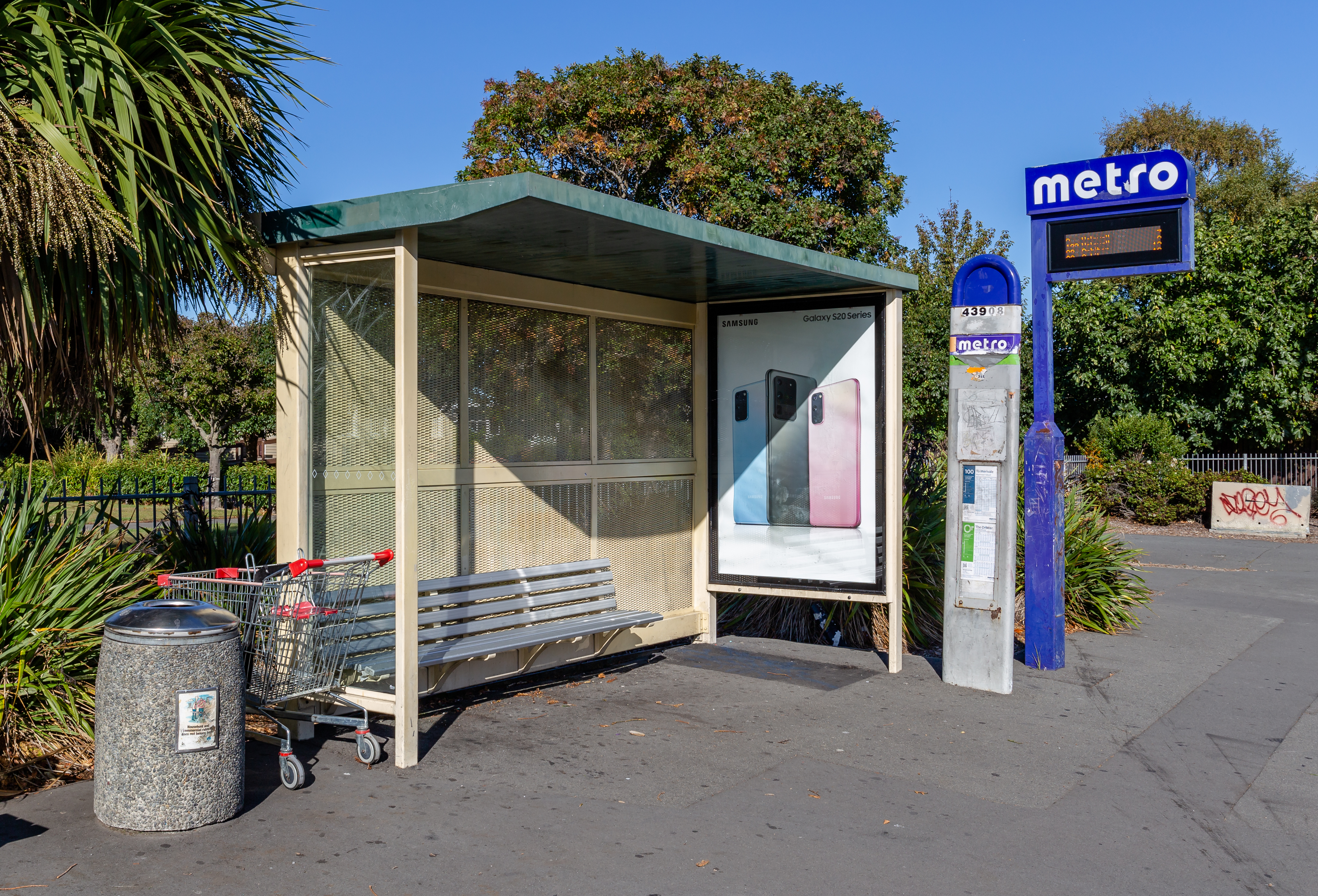
Bus stop in Shirley, New Zealand.

Bus services have led to the implementation of various types of infrastructure now common in many urban and suburban settings. The most prevalent example is the ubiquitous bus stop. Large interchanges have required the building of bus stations. In roads and streets, infrastructure for buses has resulted in modifications to the kerb line such as protrusions and indentations, and even special kerb stones. Entire lanes or roads have been reserved for buses in bus lanes or busways. Bus fleets require large storage premises often located in urban areas, and may also make use of central works facilities.

=== Management ===
The level and reliability of bus services are often dependent on the quality of the local road network and levels of traffic congestion, and the population density. Services may be organised on tightly regulated networks with restrictions on when and where services operate, while other services are operated on an ad hoc basis in the model of share taxis.

Increasingly, technology is being used to improve the information provided to bus users, with vehicle tracking technologies to assist with scheduling, and to achieve real-time integration with passenger information systems that display service information at stops, inside buses, and to waiting passengers through personal mobile devices or text messaging.

=== Fare models ===
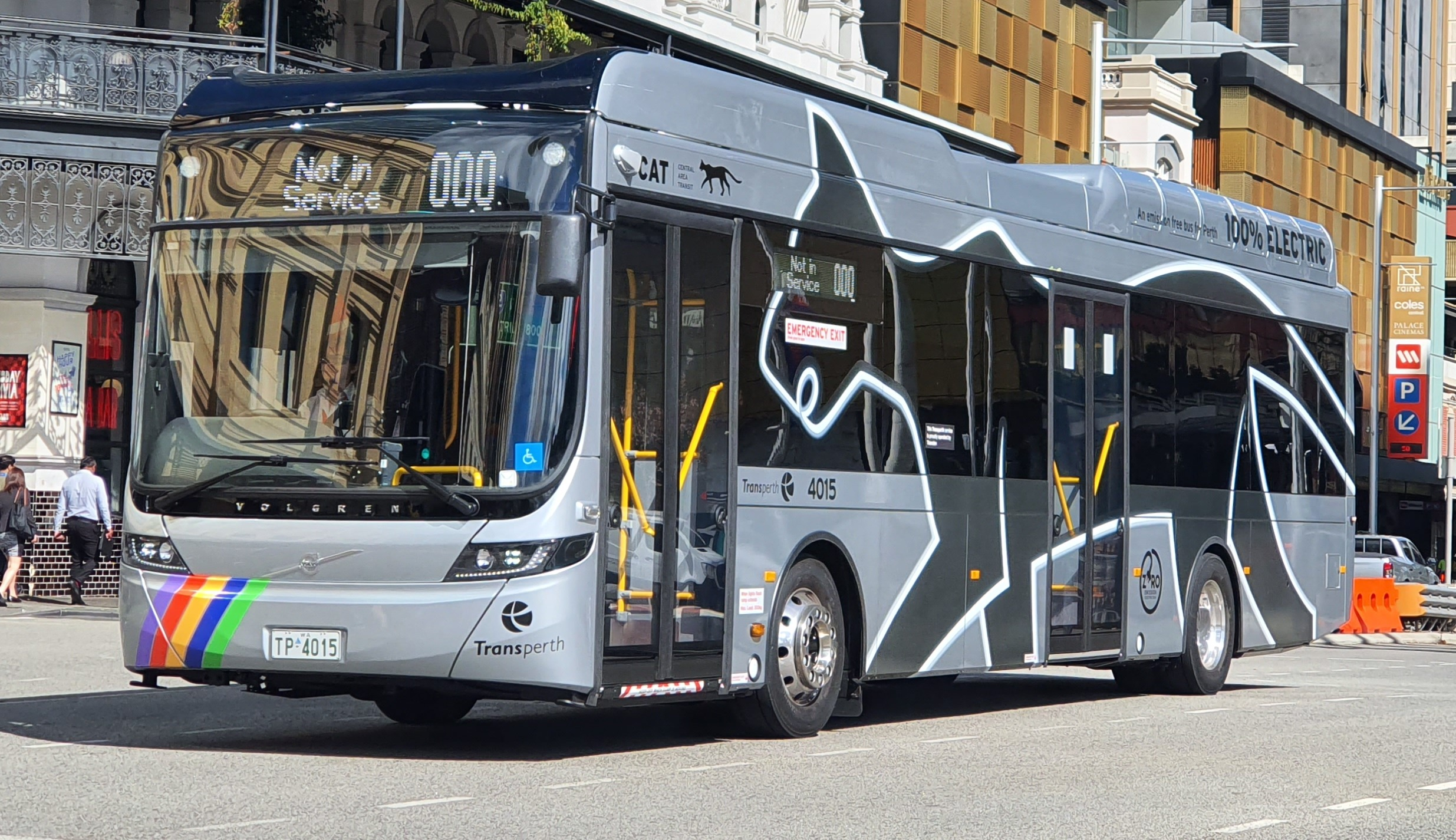
The Perth Central Area Transit operates as a zero-fare basis for passengers in the Perth central business district

Bus drivers may be required to conduct fare collection, inspect a travel pass or free travel pass, or oversee stored-value card debiting. This may require the fitting of equipment to the bus. Alternatively, this duty and equipment may be delegated to a conductor who rides on the bus. In other areas, public transport buses may operate on a zero-fare basis, or ticket validation may be through the use of on-board/off-board proof-of-payment systems, checked by roving ticket controllers who board and alight buses at random.

In some competitive systems, an incumbent operator may introduce a "low-cost unit" paying lower wages, in order to be able to offer lower fares, using older buses cascaded from a main fleet to also reduce costs. In some sectors, operators such as Megabus (both in the UK and in North America) have attempted to emulate the low-cost airlines model in order to attract passengers through low fares, by offering no-frills bus services.

=== Ownership ===
Public transport bus operation is differentiated from other bus operation by the fact the owner or driver of a bus is employed by or contracted to an organisation whose main public duty or commercial interest is to provide a public transport service for passengers to turn up and use, rather than fulfilling private contracts between the bus operator and user. Public transport buses are operated as a common carrier under a contract of carriage between the passenger and the operator.

The owners of public transport buses may be the municipal authority or transit authority that operates them, or they may be owned by individuals or private companies who operate them on behalf of the authorities on a franchise or contract basis. Other buses may be run entirely as private concerns, either on an owner-operator basis, or as multi-national transport groups. Some countries have specifically deregulated their bus services, allowing private operators to provide public bus services. In this case, an authority may make up the shortfall in levels of private service provision by funding or operating 'socially necessary' services, such as early or late services, on the weekends, or less busy routes. Ownership/operation of public transport buses can also take the form of a charitable operation or not for profit social enterprises.

Larger operations may have fleets of thousands of vehicles. At its peak in the 1950s, the London Transport Executive owned a bus fleet of 8,000 buses, the largest in the world. Many small operators have only a few vehicles or a single bus owned by an owner-driver. Andhra Pradesh State Road Transport Corporation holds the Guinness world record of having the largest fleet of buses with 22,555 buses.

=== Regulation ===
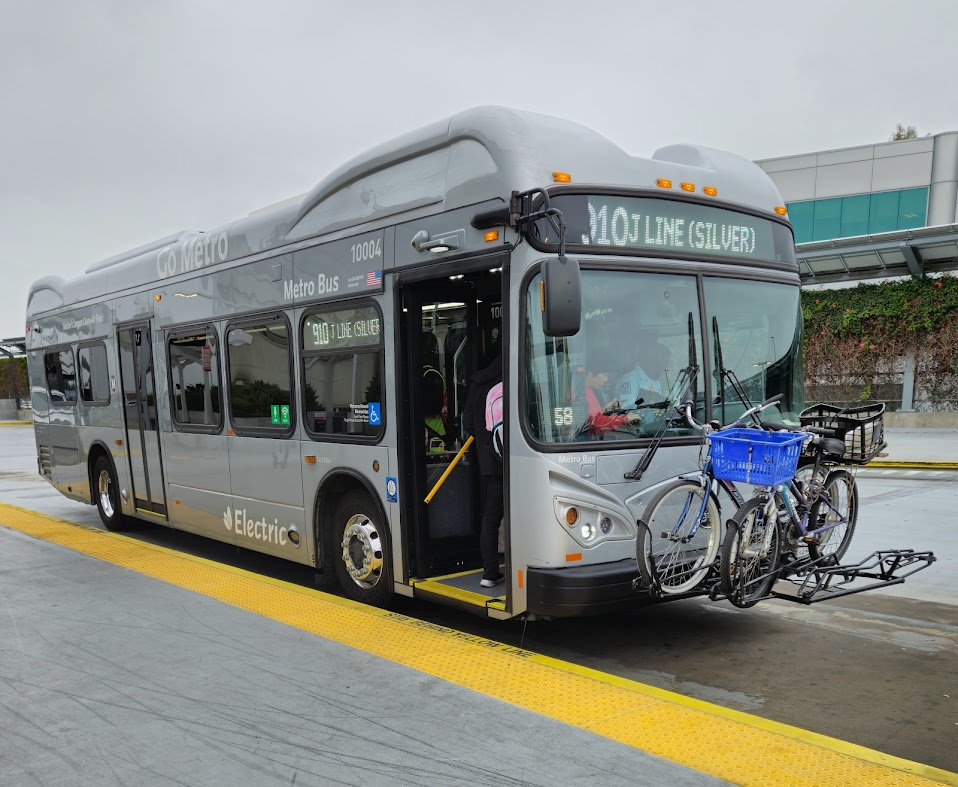
Los Angeles Metro bus with bike rack fitted to front of bus

In all cases in the developed world, public transport bus services are usually subject to some form of legal control in terms of vehicle safety standards and method of operation, and possibly the level of fares charged and routes operated.

Bus services are being made accessible, often in response to rules and regulations in disability discrimination laws. This has resulted in the introduction of paratransit services and low-floor buses to support passengers who are elderly, have a disability, or a medical condition.

Some transit agencies have also started to install bike racks in the front of buses that usually holds two bicycles. Passengers would be able to place their bicycle on the racks when riding to avoid taking up space during rush hour.

=== Safety ===
The research conducted in Montreal (Canada) showed that travelling by bus is safer than travelling by car, for vehicle occupants but also for pedestrians and cyclists. There were 16 times more injured car occupants than bus occupants. Most pedestrians (95%) and cyclists (96%) were injured by a car. Looking at major injuries only (excluding minor injuries), there were 28 times more injured car occupants than bus occupants. Cars were associated with three cyclist deaths and 42 pedestrian deaths while buses were associated with no cyclist deaths and four pedestrian deaths.

== See also ==
- Bus rapid transit
- Destination sign
- Express train
- Limited stop
- List of bus operating companies
- Straddling bus
- Trolleybus
