= Pingzhi Fan =

Chinese electrical engineer

Pingzhi Fan is an electrical engineer at Southwest Jiaotong University in Chengdu, China. He was named a Fellow of the Institute of Electrical and Electronics Engineers (IEEE) in 2015 for his contributions to signal design in wireless communications.
