= Zhou Wenjun (disambiguation) =

Zhou Wenjun may refer to:

- Zhou Wenjun (athlete) (born 1986), Paralympian athlete from China
- Wen Tsing Chow (1918–2001), or Zhou Wenjun, Chinese-born American missile guidance scientist
