= Fan Xuji =

Fan Xuji (Chinese: 范绪箕; pinyin: Fàn Xùjī; 5 January 1914 – 21 November 2015) was a Chinese engineer and academic who served as President of Shanghai Jiao Tong University.

== Biography ==
Fan was born on 5 January 1914 in Beijing. His father was among the first students sent to Russia by the Qing Dynasty and studied railway engineering. Fan completed his elementary education in Beijing, and moved with his family to Harbin in 1925. In 1929, Fan enrolled in Harbin Institute of Technology, majoring in mechanical engineering. He obtained a bachelor's degree and also mastered Russian language. In the following years, he went to study at the California Institute of Technology in the United States and obtained two master's degrees in mechanical engineering and aeronautic engineering. Fan became the vice president of SJTU in 1979, and the president in 1980. He retired in 1984 and turned 100 in January 2014. He died in Shanghai on 21 November 2015.

Academic offices
Preceded by Zhu Wuhua	President of Shanghai Jiao Tong University; 1979 – 1984	Succeeded by Weng Shilie
