= Tunnel bus =

Tunnel bus may refer to:

- Transit Elevated Bus, an experimental transit concept developed in China
- the Tunnel Bus, a public transit service between the US and Canada, formerly operated by Transit Windsor
- Cross Harbour Tunnel Bus, Hong Kong
