= Transit Elevated Bus =

Former proposed bus transit concept

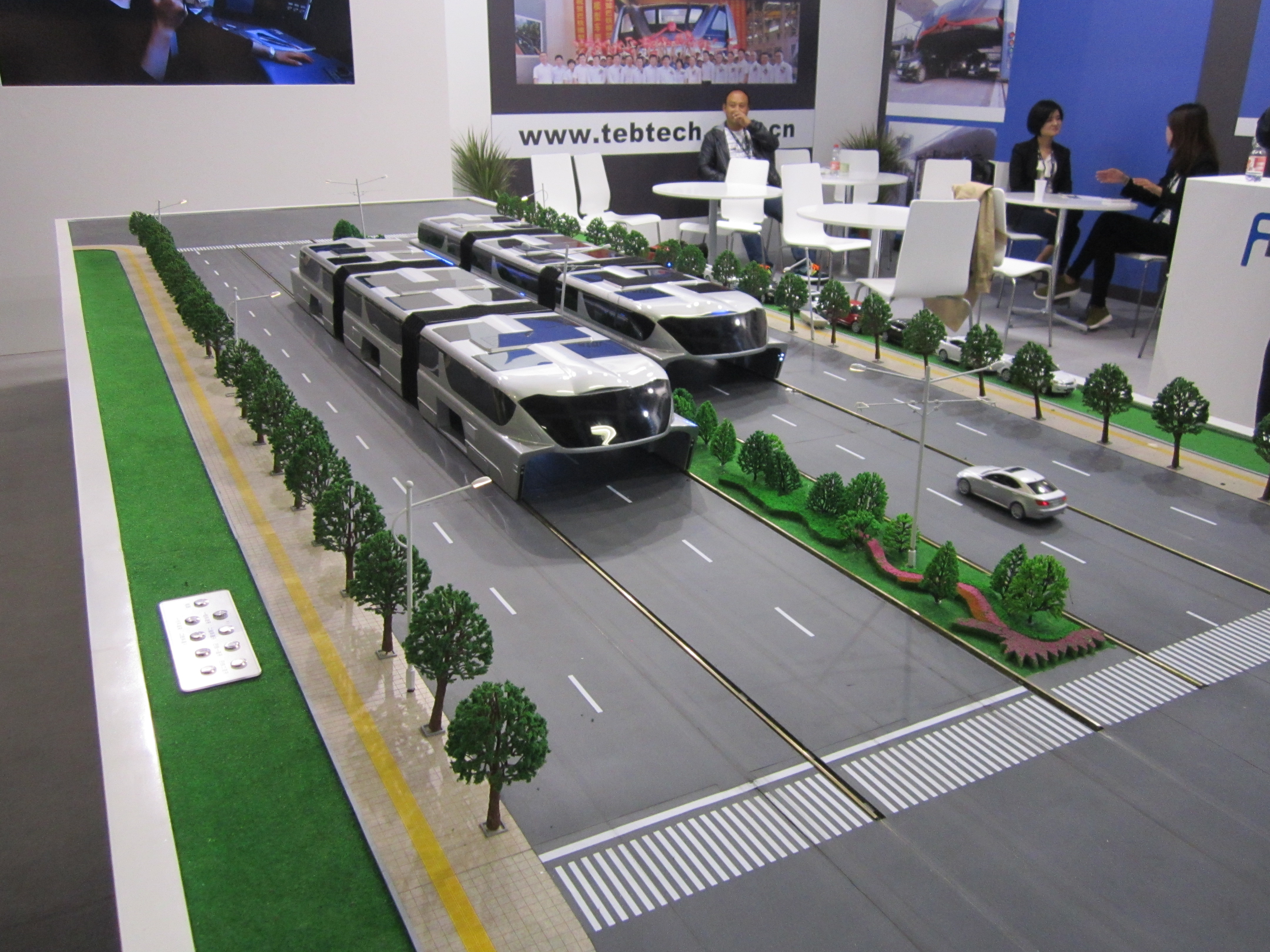
Model of the bus at InnoTrans 2016

The Transit Elevated Bus (TEB) (simplified Chinese: 巴铁; traditional Chinese: 巴鐵; pinyin: Bā Tiě) was a proposed new bus concept where a guided bus straddles above road traffic, giving it the alternative names such as straddling bus, straddle bus, land airbus, or tunnel bus by international media.

A trial was scheduled to begin in Beijing's Mentougou District by late 2010. However the project was not given authorization by the district authorities because the technology was considered to be too immature, and further trials were subject to the development of a concept to prove the system actually works. The city of Manaus, Brazil, has also evaluated the option of installing a straddle bus in its city streets. At the time of the 2016 unveiling of the scale model, it was reported that a prototype would be deployed by mid 2016 in Qinhuangdao. Four other Chinese cities, Nanyang, Shenyang, Tianjin, and Zhoukou, had also signed contracts for pilot projects involving the construction of test tracks beginning in 2016.

However a test of a prototype design was scrapped in June 2017 over concerns about its viability.

In July 2017, 32 people involved into the project were detained by Chinese authorities on suspicion of investment fraud. The prototype bus was removed from the test track in early July.

== History ==
The idea of Transit Elevated Bus was proposed in 1969 by two American architects, Craig Hodgetts and Lester Walker, as a public transport concept called the "Bos-Wash Landliner". Later, another version was designed by Shenzhen Hashi Future Parking Equipment Company (深圳華世未來泊車設備有限公司), and the concept, known as 3D Express Bus (立体快巴) at the time, was unveiled at the 13th Beijing International High-tech Expo in May 2010. A working scale model was showcased at the 2016 Beijing International High-Tech Expo.

== Description ==
In China there are four main modes of public transportation: subway, light rail, bus rapid transit (BRT), and normal buses. The express coach would be a substitute for BRT and augment its advantages. To modify the road for the bus, two options are available: rails can be laid on the edges of the lanes that the bus occupies, or two white lines can be painted on the road to facilitate use of autopilot technology. Rails would offer less wheel rolling resistance and better energy efficiency. For either option, it may be necessary to widen the lanes occupied by the bus to accommodate the bus wheels and undercarriage whilst allowing other vehicles to pass under the bus two abreast. Since the bus is no higher than a tractor-trailer, roadway overpasses will usually not be a problem.

The bus would run along a fixed route, its passenger compartment spanning the width of two traffic lanes. Its undercarriage rides along the edges of the two lanes it straddles and the overall height is 4,000 to 4,500 mm (13 ft 1 in to 14 ft 9 in). Vehicles lower than 2,000 mm (6 ft 7 in) high will be able to pass underneath the bus, reducing the number of traffic jams caused by ordinary buses loading and unloading at bus stops.

Passengers on board the bus are expected to experience a ride comparable to riding in the upper level of a double decker bus. They will board and alight at stations at the side of the road with platforms at the bus floor height similar to stations of an elevated railway, or via stairs descending through the roof of the bus from a station similar to a pedestrian overpass. The bus will be electrically powered using overhead lines or other roof electrical contact systems designed for it, supplemented with photovoltaic panels, batteries, or supercapacitors on board. It will travel at up to 60 km/h (37 mph). Different versions will carry up to 1,200 passengers, with the larger versions being articulated to facilitate going around curves. A working scale model of the now called Transit Explore Bus (TEB) was showcased at the 2016 Beijing International High-Tech Expo.

The bus would have alarms to warn cars traveling too close to it, and signals to warn other vehicles when it is about to turn. It would have inflatable evacuation slides similar to those of an aircraft. Optional features could include sensors to keep it from colliding with a person or object (such as an overheight vehicle in front), warning lights and safety curtains at the rear to keep drivers of overheight vehicles from going underneath, repeater traffic signals underneath to relay the indications of traffic signals up ahead, and animated light displays to simulate stationary objects to prevent disorientation of drivers underneath.

According to the 2010 proposal, it would cost about 500 million yuan (~US$74.5 million) to build the bus with a 40 km (25 mi) guideway. This is claimed to be at 10% of the cost of building an equivalent subway, and is estimated to reduce traffic congestion by 20–30%. The Chairman of the company has said that it would only take a year for one to be built.

At the 2016 unveiling of the Transit Explore Bus (TEB) scale model, Mr. Song claimed each bus will cost about 30 million renminbi, or about US$4.5 million, now estimated at one-sixteenth the price of a subway train. According to China's Xinhua News Agency, the bus can carry 300 people.

== Proposed and actual trials ==
The cities of Shijiazhuang, in Hebei Province, and Wuhu, in Anhui Province, had applied to obtain financing. A total of 185 km (115 mi) of track was set for construction in the Mentougou District of Beijing for late 2010. The trial run was cancelled due to doubts about the project.

The city of Manaus, Brazil signed a letter of intent with the Chinese developers to create a straddling bus system.

At the time of the 2016 unveiling of the scale model, it was reported that a prototype would be deployed by mid-2016 in Qinhuangdao, a coastal city about 300 km (190 mi) east of Beijing. Song Youzhou, the designer of the bus, said in an interview that other four Chinese cities, Nanyang, Shenyang, Tianjin, and Zhoukou, have also signed contracts with his company for pilot projects involving the construction of hundreds of kilometres of tracks beginning in 2016.

The inaugural test of such a bus was carried out on a 300 m (980 ft) track in the city of Qinhuangdao, Hebei in August 2016, using the Transit Explore Bus 1 (TEB-1) model which was 22 m (72 ft 2 in) long, 7.8 m (25 ft 7 in) wide and 4.8 m (15 ft 9 in) high, with a capacity of 300 passengers.

In August 2016, China's state media People's Daily Online labelled the tested Transit Elevated Bus a complete scam after Qinghuangdao government officials said that they were unaware of the test.

On 9 December 2016, it was reported after the unveiling in August, investors withdrew, and the TEB "has been left in a rusted-out barn — in the middle of a major road".

== Recognition ==
The Straddling Bus was selected by Time magazine as one of the "50 Best Inventions of the Year 2010".

== Criticism and controversies ==
Critics of the project when the concept was unveiled in 2010 have questioned whether the hovering bus could interact safely with other vehicles, particularly when drivers manoeuvre to change lanes. Critics had also argued that the tracks would require relatively straight roads not found in many older urban areas, and that the overhead boarding stations that the bus needed would take up too much space.

According to Song Youzhou, the project's chief engineer, guardrails would be constructed between the bus tracks and the car lanes that pass through the elevated bus to prevent traffic accidents. The rails would be able to absorb at least 70% of a collision's impact to reduce damage to the bus and other vehicles. Lanes for the elevated bus would be limited to passenger vehicles no higher than 2.2 m (7 ft 3 in), and the buses are designed to meet zoning and bridge height regulations in each city. He also said that the buses were fully capable of turning corners, though the cars underneath must wait until the buses have passed before turning themselves.

In 2016 Mr. Song said to Chinese media that he had arranged to have Shanghai Jiao Tong University's Institute of Automotive Engineering to assess the feasibility of the TEB design. However, the institute’s director denied that he had any involvement with Mr. Song. The institute's vice director and two professors said in the same report that they had conducted a design analysis, but that it was a personal initiative. Based on their assessment, the professors said, the design was "basically feasible" but "not perfect". Southwest Jiaotong University also denied the involvement of technical research and development. "It is true that two researchers from Laboratory of Traction Power had a feasibility meeting with the company", the deputy director of the lab Wang Kaiyun said, "but the comment on it was 'suspicious' (悬)."

In July 2017 the track was demolished after Qinghuangdao refused to extend the TEB developer's land contract which was scheduled to expire in July. In July the bus was removed and police arrested 32 individuals for "illegally raising funds to finance the TEB" after complaints from 72 investors were filed with them.

== See also ==
- Monorail
- Dahir Insaat
- Autonomous Rapid Transit (ART)
