= Weng Shilie =

Weng Shilie (Chinese: 翁史烈; pinyin: Wēng Shǐliè; born 1932) is a Chinese scientist and an expert in thermo-engine. He formerly served as the president of Shanghai Jiao Tong University and was elected a member of Chinese Academy of Engineering (CAE) in 1995.

== Biography ==
Born in Ningbo, Zhejiang Province, Weng graduated from the ship building department of Shanghai Jiao Tong University in 1952. He obtained a Soviet doctor's degree (Candidate of Sciences) at the institute of ship building in Leningrad of USSR in 1962. He served as the chairman of Shanghai Science and Technology Association.

Weng is a professor of SJTU and served as president of the University. He is one of the main founders of China's new generation of thermo-turbines.

Academic offices
Preceded by Fan Xuji	President of Shanghai Jiao Tong University; 1984 – 1997	Succeeded by Xie Shengwu
