= Xie Shengwu =

Chinese physicist

Xie Shengwu (Chinese: 谢绳武; born November 22, 1943) is a Chinese physicist who served as President of Shanghai Jiao Tong University from 1997 to 2006.

Xie was born in Shaoxing, Zhejiang Province. From 1960 to 1966, he studied in the department of engineering physics at SJTU, majoring in nuclear reactors. From 1966 to 1970, he was a teaching assistant in the physics teaching office at SJTU. Xie later became a teaching assistant and vice director of the laser research lab. From 1978 to 1981, he studied optics in the department of applied physics at SJTU and obtained a master's degree. From 1981 to 1991, Xie was elevated to a full professor of physics, and later served as the chair of the physics department. From 1991, he served as the vice president of SJTU and a member of the University's CPC standing committee. He became the dean of the graduate school and a doctor's supervisor in 1994.

From July 1997, Xie served as the president of SJTU until his retirement on November 27, 2006.

Academic offices
Preceded by Weng Shilie	President of Shanghai Jiao Tong University; 1997 – 2006	Succeeded by Zhang Jie
