= Cao Jianyou =

Chinese electrical engineer

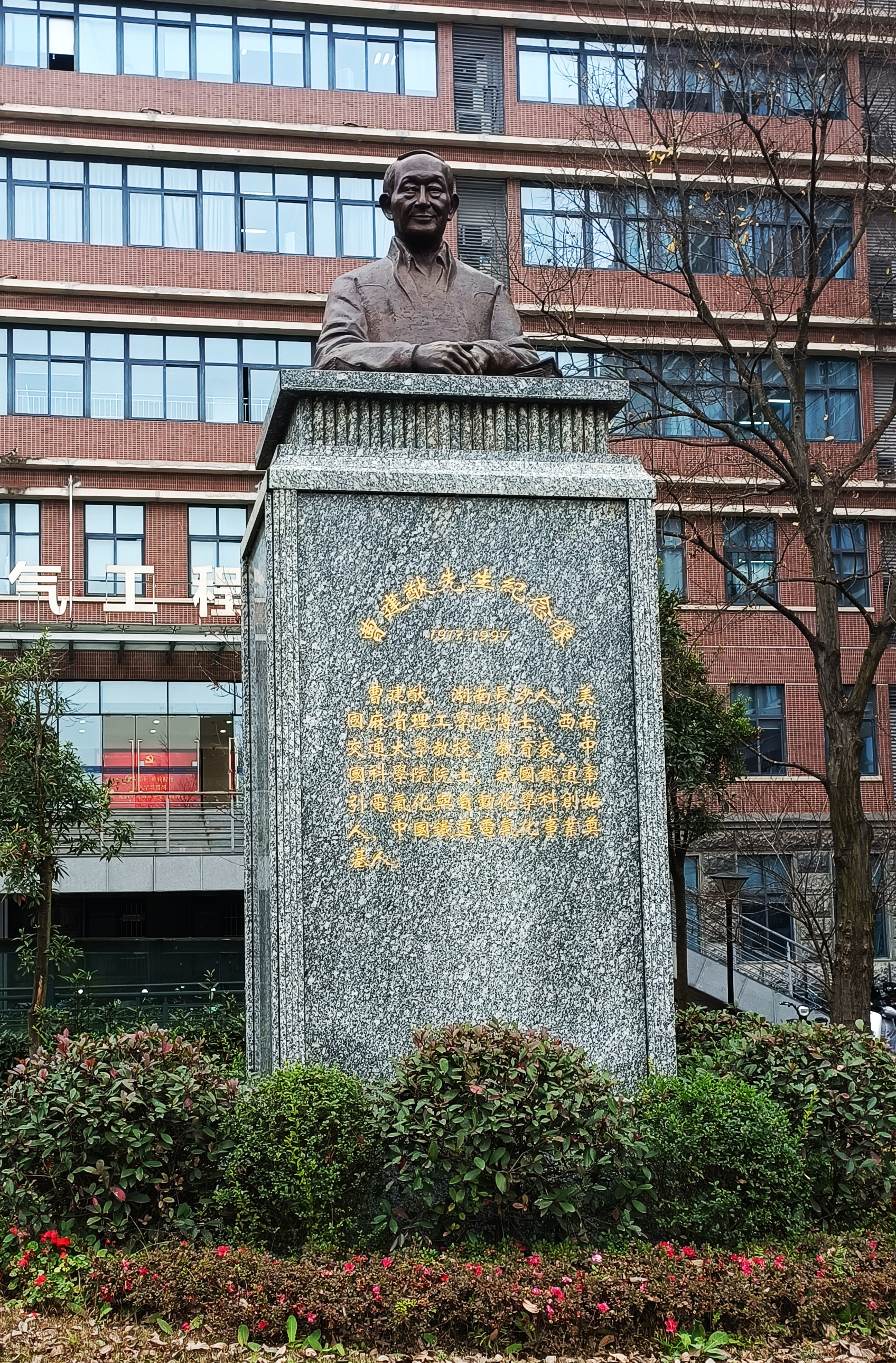
Cao Jianyou memorial statue (2016) in front of the Electrical Engineering Building/Teaching Building No. 10 on the Xipu Campus of Southwest Jiaotong University.

Cao Jianyou (Chinese: 曹建猷; pinyin: Cáo Jiànyóu; July 19, 1917 – September 19, 1997) was a Chinese electrical engineer. He was one of the earliest contributors to Chinese railway electrification, a member of Chinese Academy of Sciences, and an expert in electric power system.

== Biography ==
Cao Jianyou was born on July 19, 1917, in Changsha, Hunan, Republic of China. He was admitted to the Department of Electrical Engineering of Shanghai Jiaotong University in 1936. After graduation in 1940, he joined the School of Engineering of Southwest Associated University as a faculty member. In 1945 he went to the U.S. to further his study, and got his Ph.D. degree from Massachusetts Institute of Technology in 1950 with his graduation paper Betatron characteristics of the MIT Synchrotron. He joined City College of New York after graduation, as a guest lecturer. After returning to China in 1951, he joined Department of Electrical Engineering of Tangshan Institute of Technology (now Southwest Jiaotong University), where he became the dean of department later. In 1978, he was appointed as Vice Chancellor of Southwest Jiaotong University. In 1980, he was elected to be a member of Chinese Academy of Sciences.
