= Zhang Jie (physicist) =

Chinese academic and administrator (born 1958)

Zhang Jie (Chinese: 张杰; born January 31, 1958) is a Chinese physicist. He served as President of Shanghai Jiao Tong University from November 2006 to February 2017.

== Upbringing and education ==
Zhang Jie was born in 1958 in Taiyuan, Shanxi, China. He received both his bachelor's degree and master's degree from Inner Mongolia University, and his Ph.D. degree from the Institute of Physics, Chinese Academy of Sciences (CAS) in 1988.

== Career ==
From 1988 to 1998, he was a visiting scholar at the Max Planck Society in Germany and at Rutherford Appleton Laboratory in the United Kingdom. In 1999, he returned to China and worked as a research scientist at the CAS. He was appointed head of Bureau of Fundamental Science at the CAS in 2003. On November 27, 2006, Zhang replaced Xie Shengwu as President of Shanghai Jiao Tong University.

Zhang Jie is a member of the Board of Trustees of King Abdullah University of Science and Technology (KAUST).

Zhang Jie was an alternate of the 17th and 18th Central Committee of the Chinese Communist Party.

== Awards and honors ==
He was elected a member of the Chinese Academy of Sciences in 2003. He was elected to the German Academy of Sciences Leopoldina on March 28, 2007. He was elected as foreign associate of the US National Academy of Sciences in 2012. In 2022, he became a laureate of the Asian Scientist 100 by the Asian Scientist.

Academic offices
Preceded by Xie Shengwu	President of Shanghai Jiao Tong University; 2006–2017	Succeeded by Lin Zhongqin
