= Dahir Insaat =

Russian–Turkish design company

Dahir İnşaat
- Industry: Research and development Architecture
- Founder: Dahir Kurmanbievich Semenov
- Headquarters: Istanbul, Turkey
- Website: www.dahirinsaat.com

Dahir İnşaat (Turkish for "Dahir Construction"), often written without Turkish letters as Dahir Insaat, is a company founded in Istanbul by Russian engineer and inventor Dahir Kurmanbievich Semenov (Russian: Дахир Курманбиевич Семенов). It is known for its futuristic design concepts, including concepts for large quadcopters, automation, and prefabrication. The designs are generally dismissed as wildly impractical, and the animated videos featuring them have frequently gone viral on the internet due to their absurd nature. Semenov has been compared to prolific inventor Buckminster Fuller.

One of Dahir Insaat's designs is for a bed that becomes a "fortress" in an earthquake. Critics have described it as a claustrophobic coffin.

Another design is for an aerial train. Insaat says it could travel at 400 mph with electricity supplied by a tether that is linked to an electrified rail. This rail runs on the ground between stations.

The firm's other designs include a drive-thru supermarket which would literally be driven through and a gyroscopic transport vehicle that would move above traffic. A writer for The Verge critically described the videos of the gyroscopic vehicle as designed for "virality" and as "futuristic transport porn."
