= Chen Junliang =

Chinese scientist

- Born: October 10, 1933 (age 92); Yinzhou District, Ningbo, Zhejiang, China
- Education: Shanghai Jiao Tong University
- Scientific career
- Fields: Switching technology Telecommunications network
- Workplaces: Beijing University of Posts and Telecommunications

Chinese name
- Traditional Chinese: 陳俊亮
- Simplified Chinese: 陈俊亮
Transcriptions
Standard Mandarin
- Hanyu Pinyin: Chén Jùnliàng

Chen Junliang (Chinese: 陈俊亮; born 10 October 1933) is a Chinese scientist specializing in switching technology and telecommunications network. He is an academician of the Chinese Academy of Sciences (CAS) and the Chinese Academy of Engineering (CAE). He is one of the founders of China's SPC switching system and pioneer of China's intelligent network (IN).

== Biography ==
Chen was born in Yinzhou District, Ningbo, Zhejiang, on October 10, 1933, during the Republic of China. His father was a small merchant. When the Marco Polo Bridge Incident broke out, his family moved to Shanghai. He elementary studied at a missionary school. In September 1951 he was accepted to Shanghai Jiao Tong University, majoring in the Telecommunication Department, where he graduated in July 1955. He worked briefly at Beijing University of Posts and Telecommunications. After a year of studying at Beijing Russian Institute (now Beijing Foreign Studies University), he entered the Moscow Institute of Telecommunication Engineering, where he graduated in June 1961. He returned to China in 1961 and joined the faculty of Beijing University of Posts and Telecommunications. He was a visiting scholar at the University of California, Berkeley and University of California, Los Angeles between December 1978 and February 1981. He is one of the first 50 Chinese scholars to visit the United States after the reform and opening up. He was president of China Institute of Communications (CIC).

He was a delegate to the 8th and 9th National People's Congress. He was a member of the 10th Standing Committee of the Chinese People's Political Consultative Conference.

== Contributions ==
At the beginning of 1967, he took part in the research and development of Dong Fang Hong I space satellite, heading the wireless data transportation system, which won him the National Science Congress Award in 1978. In the 1980s, he participated in the development of DS-2000 SPC digital switching system in the 6th Five-year Plan and the DS-30 SPC digital switching system in the 7th Five-year Plan. In the 1990s, he was engaged in the network intelligence research and developed China's first IN system.

== Honours and awards ==
- 1978 National Science Congress Award
- 1988 State Science and Technology Progress Award (First Class)
- November 1991 Member of the Chinese Academy of Sciences (CAS)
- November 1994 Member of the Chinese Academy of Engineering (CAE)
- 1999 State Science and Technology Progress Award (Third Class)
- 2004 State Science and Technology Progress Award (Second Class)
- 2009 State Science and Technology Progress Award (Second Class)
- 2013 Lifetime Achievement Award of the China Computer Federation (CCF)
