= Southwest Jiaotong University =

Public research university in Chengdu, Sichuan, China

- 西南交通大学
- Former name: National Jiaotong University
- Motto: "Diligence, Ambition, Decisiveness, Loyalty"
- Type: Public research university
- Established: 1896; 130 years ago
- Affiliations: Double First Class University, 211 Project, Association of MBAs
- President: Xuedong Yan
- Academic staff: 2,612
- Students: 43,503
- Undergraduates: 38,132
- Postgraduates: 11,356
- Location: Chengdu, Sichuan, China; 30°46′10″N 103°59′05″E
- Campus: Urban
- Language: Chinese
- Mascot: 火车侠
- Website: swjtu.edu.cn

Chinese name
- Simplified Chinese: 西南交通大学
- Traditional Chinese: 西南交通大學
- Literal meaning: Southwest Transport University
Transcriptions
Standard Mandarin
- Hanyu Pinyin: Xīnán Jiāotōng Dàxué

Southwest Jiaotong University (SWJTU; 西南交通大学) is a national public science and engineering university in Chengdu, Sichuan, China. The university is affiliated with the Ministry of Education. It is a national key university co-sponsored by the Ministry of Education, China Railway Corporation, the Sichuan Provincial Government, and the Chengdu Municipal Government. The university is part of Project 211 and the Double First-Class Construction.

SWJTU was founded in 1896 and is one of China's leading engineering universities. Known as the cradle of China's railway engineers, SWJTU is the birthplace of China's modern education in transportation, mining and metallurgy, and civil engineering. Through its history, the university has adopted different names such as "Imperial Chinese Railway College," "Tangshan Jiaotong University," and "Tangshan Institute of Railway."

SWJTU is consistently ranked as one of the top universities in China, placing 181-190 in The Times Higher Education Asia University Rankings 2016 and ranking 161 in The Times Higher Education BRICS & Emerging Economies 2016. It was included as one of the first universities into Double First Class University Plan and former Project 211. To date, SWJTU faculty and alumni have won 57 fellowships to the United States and China National Academy of Sciences. It is a Chinese state Double First Class University.

== Notable alumni ==
- Mao Yisheng: an expert on bridge construction and social activist.
- Tung-Yen Lin: structural engineer best known as the pioneer of standardizing the use of prestressed concrete.
- Jianyou Cao: One of the earliest contributors to Chinese railway electrification, a member of Chinese Academy of Sciences, and an expert in electric power system; the founder of the school of electrical engineering of Southwest Jiaotong University.
