= Wen Tsing Chow =

Wen Tsing Chow (Chinese: 周文俊; pinyin: Zhōu Wénjùn; 1918–2001), was a Chinese-born American missile guidance scientist and a digital computer pioneer, known for the invention of programmable read-only memory or PROM.

== Biography ==
Chow was born in Taiyuan, Shanxi in 1918. He received a B.S. in Electrical Engineering from National Chiao Tung University (now Shanghai Jiao Tong University) in 1940 and an M.S. in EE from the Massachusetts Institute of Technology in 1942.

Chow, working for the Arma Division of the American Bosch Arma Corporation, pioneered the use of digital computers in missile, satellite and spacecraft guidance systems, leading the design of the United States Air Force Atlas E/F ICBM (Inter-Continental Ballistic Missile) all-inertial guidance system and guidance computer, the first production airborne digital computer. Mr. Chow personally formulated the design of the first all solid state, high reliability, space-borne digital computer and established the basic systems approach and mechanization of America's ICBM guidance systems.

Chow invented and holds a fundamental patent on what is now commonly known as programmable read-only memory or PROM. PROM, in the late 1950s called a "constants storage matrix," was invented for the Atlas E/F ICBM airborne digital computer.

He would continue working throughout the 1960s and early 1970s to develop and advance missile and spacecraft digital computers and guidance systems technology beyond the state of the art - working at the Aerospace Corporation in the Gemini and Minuteman programs and at IBM in the B-1, B-52, Saturn V and Skylab programs, and of course, in the development of the AP-101 digital computer used in the Space Shuttle Computer Complex.

Chow, uniquely, worked on the guidance computers and guidance systems for every major United States Air Force ICBM and NASA crewed space program from the very beginning with the Atlas, through Titan, Gemini, Saturn, and Skylab, to missiles and spacecraft still in service today, Minuteman and the Space Shuttle.

In 2004, the United States Air Force posthumously awarded Mr. Chow one of their highest awards, the Air Force Space and Missiles Pioneers Award, previously held by only 30 individuals. Chow is one of only a handful of civilians to receive this award and along with John von Neumann, one of only two computer scientists so honored.
