= Zhu Wuhua =

Chinese electronics engineer

Zhu Wuhua (Chinese: 朱物华; January 1902 – March 1998) was a Chinese electronics engineer. He was an acoustic expert and an academician of the Chinese Academy of Sciences.

== Biography ==
Zhu was born in Yangzhou, Jiangsu Province, and graduated from Shanghai Jiao Tong University in 1923. He obtained his master's degree from MIT in 1924, and his doctor's degree from Harvard University in 1926. Zhu was a professor and advisor of Shanghai Jiao Tong University and a former president of the institution. Zhu was a founding member of Chinese Academy of Sciences, elected in 1955.

Former Chinese leader Jiang Zemin is reported to have called Zhu his "second uncle" (二叔) and inscribed the title to a volume of essays commemorating his 65th anniversary as a teacher.
