= Piccadilly Gardens (painting) =

1954 painting by L. S. Lowry

- Artist: L. S. Lowry
- Year: 1954
- Medium: Oil on canvas
- Movement: Naïve art
- Dimensions: 76.2 cm × 101.6 cm (30 in × 40 in)
- Location: Manchester Art Gallery; Manchester

Piccadilly Gardens is a 1954 oil painting by the English artist L. S. Lowry. It depicts Piccadilly Gardens, a large garden square in Manchester city centre, north-west England. The painting hangs in the Manchester Art Gallery on nearby Mosley Street.

== Description ==
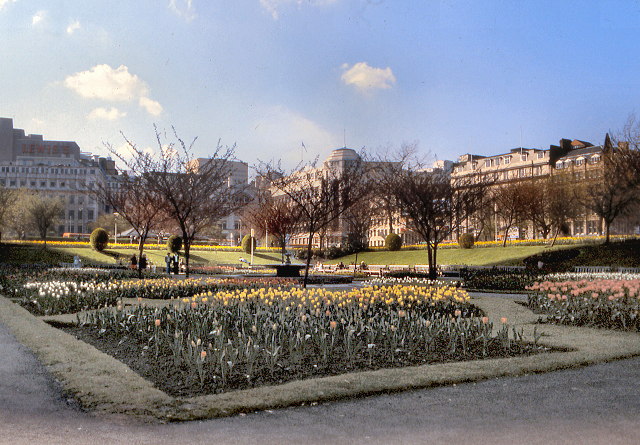
A 1979 photograph of Lowry's approximate viewpoint of Piccadilly Gardens, with the former sunken gardens (removed 2001)

The painting presents a view of Piccadilly Gardens from the south-east corner, next to Portland Street. Visible are the former sunken gardens, with people walking, sitting on benches, standing in groups, exercising dogs on leads, and pushing prams. In the centre of the gardens stands the Coronation Fountain, installed the year before Lowry painted this scene to commemorate the Coronation of Queen Elizabeth II.

In the distance can be seen tall white Rylands Building, an Art Deco warehouse on the corner of Mosley Street and Market Street. Red Manchester Corporation buses run along Piccadilly and Mosley Street.

The painting is signed in the bottom-right corner "L.S.LOWRY 1954".

Details visible in Lowry's painting

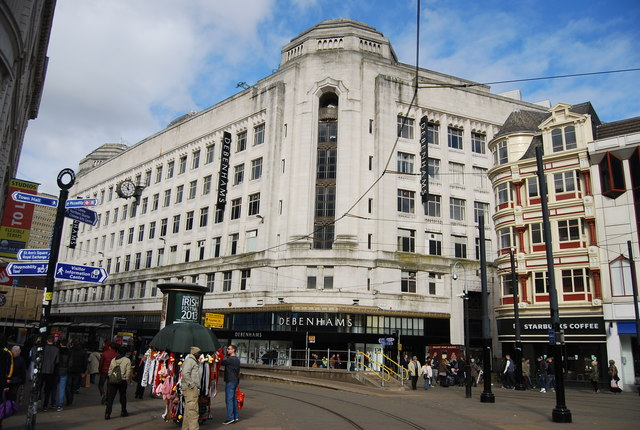
The distinctive Rylands Building (centre distance)

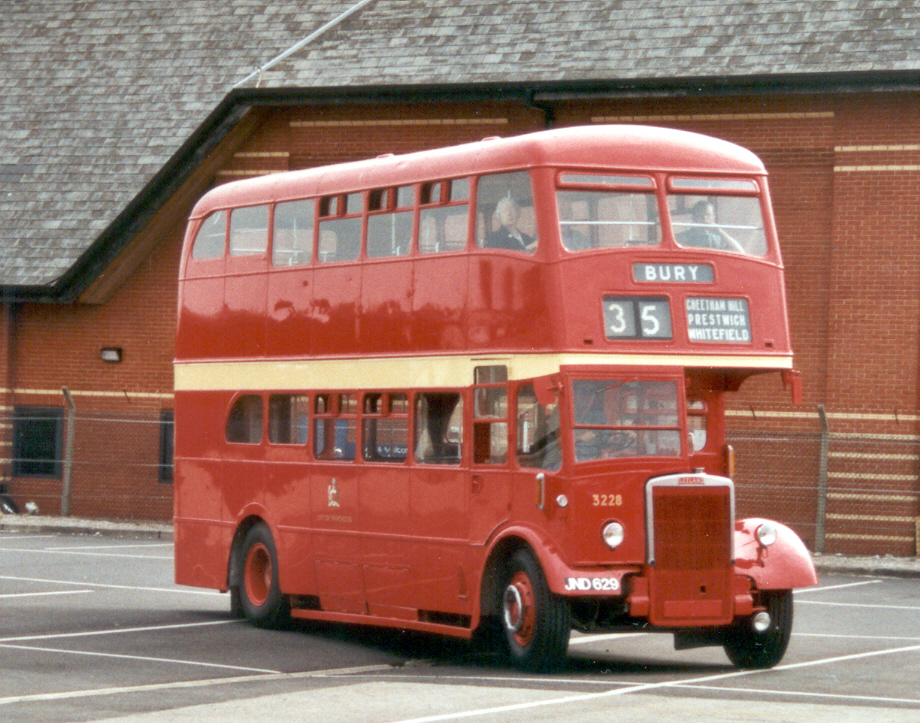
Manchester Corporation buses (distance)

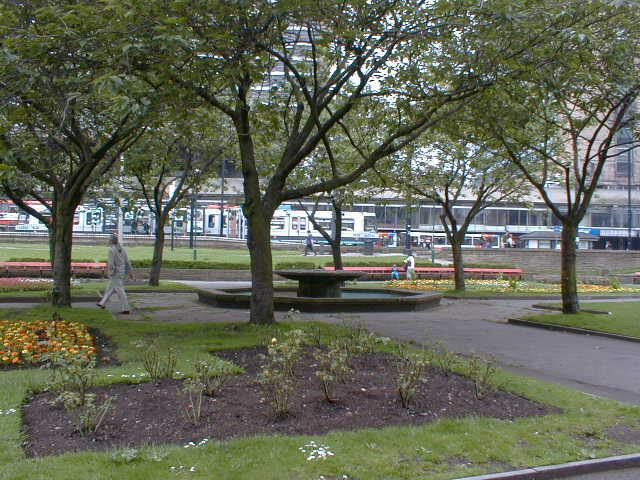
The Coronation Fountain (centre)

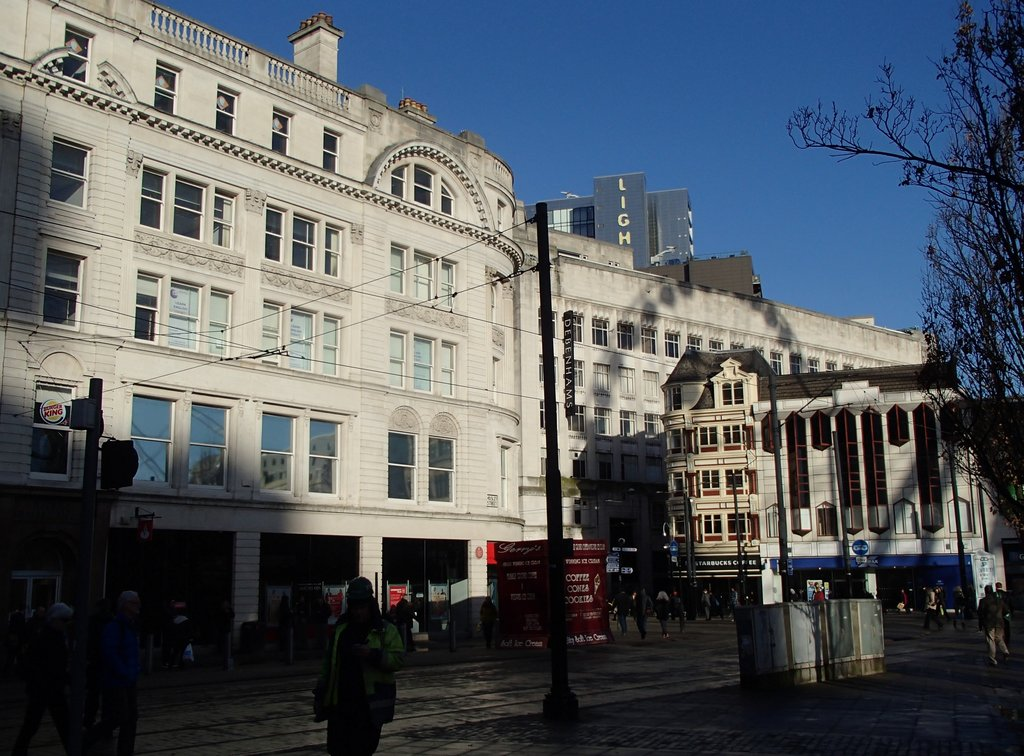
Mosley Street buildings (left distance)

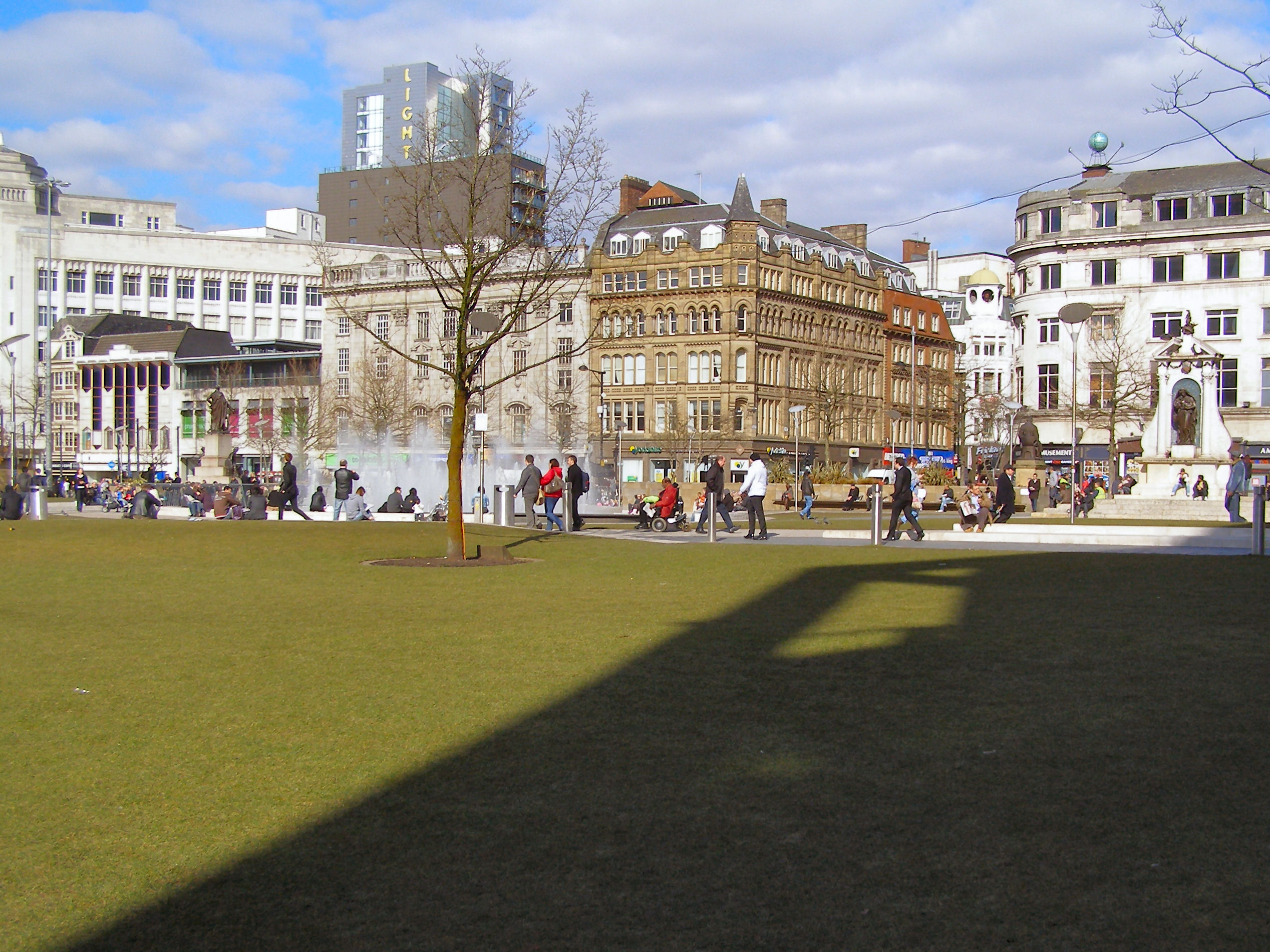
Buildings along Piccadilly (right distance)

== History ==
The area of Piccadilly Gardens in Manchester was laid out as a public garden in the 1930s on the former site of the Manchester Royal Infirmary. Lowry was familiar with the area and often visited the gardens, becoming acquainted with a range of unfortunate local people he met there, beggars and cripples, many of whom became subjects of his paintings. In 1930, Lawrence Haward, the then director of the Manchester City Art Gallery commissioned Lowry to produce studies of Piccadilly Gardens "as it is today with the sunken garden, the loafers, the rains and all the rest of the mess and muddle". Haward gave no other direction to Lowry, and when Lowry submitted his work to the gallery, Haward expressed dissatisfaction with the focus on individual figures. In an exchange of letters, Haward asked for another submission capturing a general view over the site, to which Lowry responded with annoyance, refusing to submit any more work: "Had you told me, when I asked you had you any special view in mind, I would have acted upon it... I am afraid that I cannot spend any more time on this subject."

In 1954, Leonard Cohen and Henry's Stores Ltd of Market Street commissioned a painting from Lowry, and it seems likely that Lowry used these initial sketches as a reference. In January 1956, Piccadilly Gardens was presented to the City Art Gallery as a gift from Henry's Stores to mark the 80th birthday of the company's co-founder, Mrs Henry Cohen.

The commemorative fountain depicted at the centre of the gardens was new at the time of Lowry's painting; it had replaced an earlier public sculpture entitled Adrift by John Cassidy, which was relocated to the south end of the gardens in 1953. In 2001-2003, Piccadilly Gardens were re-landscaped by Manchester City Council and the sunken garden seen in the painting was filled in. The Coronation Fountain has been relocated to Platt Fields Park in the southern suburb of Fallowfield, and Cassidy's sculpture is now situated in St Peter's Square. Following the 21st-century remodelling, Lowry's painting is noted as a historical record of the former layout of Piccadilly Gardens.

Piccadilly Gardens was included in several exhibitions of Lowry's work, and was exhibited at the Whitechapel Art Gallery in 1954 and the Manchester Academy of Fine Arts in 1955.
