= Manchester Carriage Company =

The Manchester Carriage Company was established on 1 March 1865 to provide horse-drawn bus services throughout Manchester and Salford, in England. The company was the result of a merger between the competing transport interests of local rivals John Greenwood, Robert and James Turner, and Alderman Ivie Mackie. It was merged with the Manchester Suburban Tramways Company in 1880 to form the Manchester Carriage and Tramways Company.

== See also ==
- History of public transport authorities in Manchester
