= Listed buildings in Manchester-M60 =

Manchester is a city in Northwest England. The M60 postcode area of the city is termed a non-geographic postcode area - that is, it does not correspond with a specific area. Buildings given an M60 postcode were historically very large receivers of mail, and were usually located in the city centre (postcode areas M1, 2, 3 or 4), although Great Universal Stores (located in M12) also used an M60 code. The postcode was created for internal Royal Mail reasons - it allowed for large amounts of mail to bypass the sorting processes within the city centre quickly and efficiently. The postcode contains 13 listed buildings that are recorded in the National Heritage List for England. Of these, one is listed at Grade I, the highest of the three grades, one is at Grade II*, the middle grade, and the others are at Grade II, the lowest grade. The area to the northwest contains HM Prison Manchester, and four structures associated with it are listed. The other listed buildings include two structures associated with Liverpool Road railway station, office buildings, a hotel, a department store, and a pair of bollards.

== Key ==
Grade	Criteria
I	Buildings of exceptional interest, sometimes considered to be internationally important
II*	Particularly important buildings of more than special interest
II	Buildings of national importance and special interest

== Buildings ==
Name and location	Photograph	Date	Notes	Grade
Two bollards 53.47832°N 2.25334°W		Late 18th or early 19th century	The two bollards at the west end of St John's Passage are in cast iron. They have fluted shafts and mushroom caps.	II
Railway warehouse 53.47747°N 2.25790°W		1830	The warehouse is to the north of Liverpool Road railway station, and has been converted to become part of the Museum of Science and Industry. It is in red brick with sandstone dressings and slate roofs. There are three storeys and 10 gabled bays. Loading from the rail was on the south front into the middle storey, and the road entrances were on the north side on the ground floor. The bays contain pilasters, a cornice, a lunette above the cornice in each bay, and coped gables. The openings have segmental heads, and on the north front are three-stage loading slots.	I
Former boys' prison block, HM Prison Manchester; 53.49350°N 2.24498°W	—	1866–1868	Originally a women's prison, it was designed by Alfred Waterhouse. The prison block is in red brick with stone dressings and a slate roof, and has a cruciform plan, the wings radiating from an octagonal concourse. The concourse has a clerestory with mullioned windows, a corbel table, tourelles at the corners, and a pointed roof, and the wings have four storeys.	II
Gatehouse, HM Prison Manchester; 53.49224°N 2.24564°W		1866–1868	The gatehouse to the prison was designed by Alfred Waterhouse in French Gothic style. It is in red brick with sandstone dressings and a slate roof. There are three storeys and three bays, and a two-storey two-bay wing to the left. In the centre of the main block is a round-headed archway with a fanlight, above which is a round-headed niche containing the Royal Arms. This is flanked by semi-octagonal turrets on sandstone plinths, with bands, single-light windows, and octagonal-conical roofs. The wing has a bay window and a gabled porch.	II
Main prison block, HM Prison Manchester; 53.49272°N 2.24639°W	—	1866–1868	The prison was designed by Alfred Waterhouse in Romanesque style, and built in red brick with sandstone dressings. It consists of a central hexagonal concourse and six radiating wings, a two-storey entrance wing incorporating a chapel, and five four-storey cell wings. The concourse has a clerestory with round-headed windows with pilasters, a corbel table, and a pointed roof. At the end of each cell block is a canted bay containing a staircase. The entrance wing has an arched entrance, an arcade of five windows, pilasters, and a gable.	II
Tower, HM Prison Manchester; 53.49309°N 2.24561°W		1866–1868	The tower, part of the heating and ventilation system of the prison, was designed by Alfred Waterhouse, and is in the form of a minaret. It is in red brick with sandstone dressings, it has an octagonal plan, and is 234 feet (71 m) tall. On the sides are arched recesses, and at the top is a perimeter gallery with a brick balustraded parapet on stone corbels, and a domed cupola with cast iron cresting.	II
Colonnaded railway viaduct 53.47765°N 2.25749°W		c. 1870	The viaduct was built to carry the line from the River Irwell into the goods yard of Liverpool Road railway station. It is in cast iron, and consists of a series of columns on stone bases.	II
95–103 Deansgate, 4–14 King Street, and 1–5 South King Street; 53.48122°N 2.24735°W		1875	A commercial and office block in sandstone on the fronts and brick at the rear, there is a cornice over the ground floor, sill bands, and a modillioned cornice. The building is on an island site, and has a trapezoidal plan. There are four storeys and a symmetrical front of five bays. On the ground floor are shop fronts, the windows on the first floor have round heads, on the second floor they have segmental heads, and on the top floor the heads are shouldered. At the top is a pedimented dormer with round-headed windows.	II
14 Byrom Street; 53.47820°N 2.25222°W		1896	A range of offices in red brick on a sandstone plinth, with sandstone dressings, a green slate roof, and two storeys. On the front facing Byrom Street is a round-headed doorway that has an architrave with banded Ionic pilasters, a pulvinated frieze with lettering, a dentilled cornice, and a pediment. Above it is a round-headed window with voussoirs and a shaped gable with a finial. To the left are three bays containing sash windows. The left corner is splayed and contains an oculus with a keystone. On the left return, facing St John's Churchyard, the first bay contains a Venetian window, and beyond that are six bays with sash windows.	II
Midland Hotel; 53.47732°N 2.24511°W		1898–1903	A hotel designed by Charles Trubshaw in elaborate Baroque style for the Midland Railway, it has a steel frame, and is clad in brown polished granite, red brick, and glazed buff and brown terracotta. The hotel is on an island site and has the plan of a large irregular pentagon. There are five storeys, basements and attics, and the main front on Peter Street is symmetrical with eight bays. The hotel has pilasters rising to turrets, elaborate gables, above the ground floor is a cornice and a balustraded parapet, the next three floors contain giant round-headed arches, on the fourth floor are smaller coupled round-headed arches, and at the top is a bracketed cornice, a pierced parapet, and gabled dormers in the attic.	II*
Cooperative Wholesale Society Building; 53.48698°N 2.24035°W		1928	Originally a bank, later offices and a warehouse, the building is in sandstone with a modillioned cornice, a parapet, and a mansard roof. It has a rectangular plan, and is in Classical style. There are five storeys and two attic storeys, and a symmetrical front. The ground and first floors are rusticated and above are giant pilasters. In the centre is a round-arched entrance, the ground floor window have round-heads, and above the windows are rectangular with small panes.	II
Rylands Building; 53.48220°N 2.23859°W		1932	A warehouse designed by Harry S. Fairhurst, later a department store. It has a steel frame clad in Portland stone, and an irregular quadrilateral plan. There are seven storeys and a front of 18 bays. Above the ground floor are chamfered piers, panels between the floors, six-pane windows, and a high parapet. On the front corners are canted turrets with arcaded drums and sloping roofs.	II
CIS Tower; 53.48649°N 2.23844°W		1959–1962	An office building for The Co-operative Banking Group. It has a five-storey podium built in reinforced concrete, a 26-storey main tower and a 28-storey service tower, both with a steel frame; the latter is 118 m (387 ft) tall. The podium and the main tower have glass curtain walls with black vitreous enamelled-steel panels between the floor levels, and anodised aluminium mullions. The service tower is clad with mosaic tiles; these were prone to falling off, and have been overlaid by photovoltaic panels.	II
