= Rylands Building =

Listed building in Manchester, England

Coordinates: 53.4823°N 2.2386°W

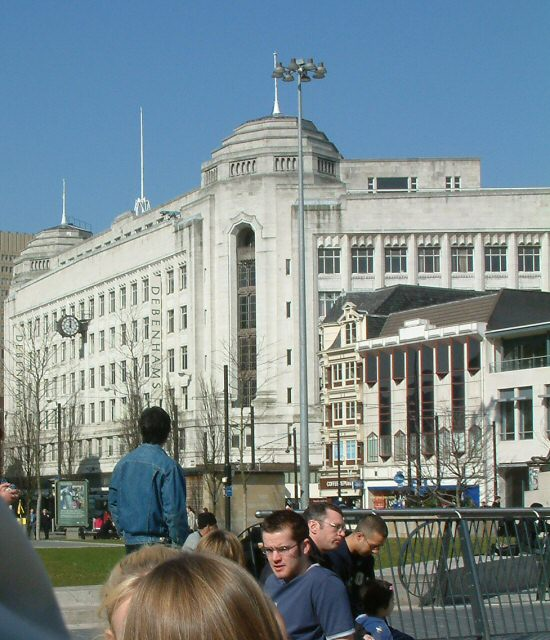
- The Rylands Building from Piccadilly Gardens
- Interactive map of the Rylands Building area

General information
- Type: Warehouse (1932–1957); Department store (1957–2021)
- Architectural style: Art Deco
- Location: Manchester, Greater Manchester, England, 109–127 Market Street, M60 1TA
- Completed: 1932

Technical details
- Floor count: 10
- Floor area: 500,000 sq ft (46,000 m^{2})

Design and construction
- Architects: Fairhursts (Harry S. & P. G. Fairhurst)
- Designations

Listed Building – Grade II
- Official name: Rylands Building (Debenhams)
- Designated: 5 June 1994
- Reference no.: 1219831

The Rylands Building is a Grade II listed building and former department store on Market Street in Manchester, England. It is situated in the Smithfield conservation area, which was known for its markets and textile warehouses, close to the Piccadilly area of Manchester city centre.

== History ==
=== Warehouse ===
The building was originally built as a warehouse by J. Gerrard & Sons of Swinton for the Rylands textile company (Rylands & Sons Ltd) which was founded by the entrepreneur John Rylands. That firm had occupied warehouses in High Street ever since 1822; its west-facing side is on High Street. The building was designed by the eminent Manchester architects, Fairhursts (Harry S. & P. G. Fairhurst), in an Art Deco style. It is clad in Portland stone and features a decorative corner tower and eclectic 'zig zag' window lintels. The work was completed in 1932.

=== Department store ===
Following a fire in 1957 which destroyed the premises of Paulden's Department Store in All Saints, the company acquired the Rylands warehouse building and converted it to a store. (However at that time the topmost floor remained in the possession of Rylands & Sons Ltd., which was sometime later acquired by Great Universal Stores.) This was then a direct rival to the Lewis's store, on the opposite side of Market Street. In 1973 Debenhams, the owner of Paulden's, rebranded the store in their name. It remained Debenhams until its closure in 2021, outlasting other Manchester department stores including Lewis's, Affleck & Brown and C&A.

=== Redevelopment ===
In 2023 the developer AM Alpha published plans to redevelop the Rylands Building to provide office, retail, and leisure spaces, as well as a four storey roof-top extension. The plans by Jeffrey Bell Architects were approved by Manchester City Council in May 2021 and the redevelopment is expected to be completed in planned phases from late 2026 onwards.

== In popular culture ==
The Rylands Building can be seen in the background of L. S. Lowry's 1954 painting, Piccadilly Gardens.

== See also ==
- Listed buildings in Manchester-M60
