= Market Street, Manchester =

Retail street in Manchester, England

Coordinates: 53°28′56.50″N 2°14′26″W

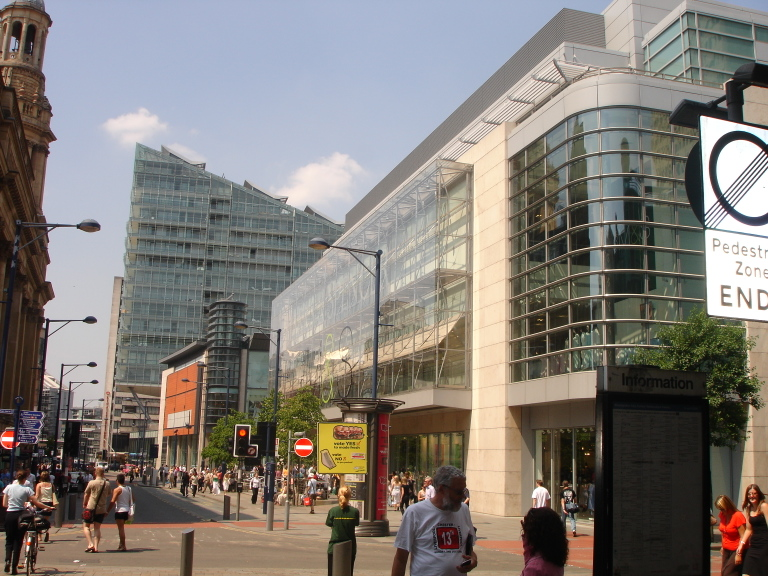
Looking down Market Street with No. 1 Deansgate in the background

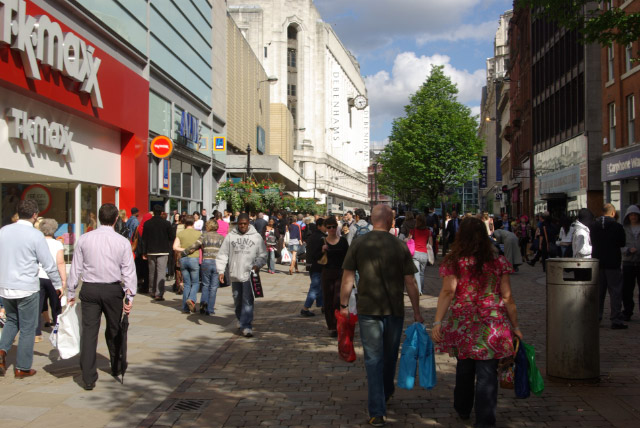
Market Street is one of Manchester's main shopping areas

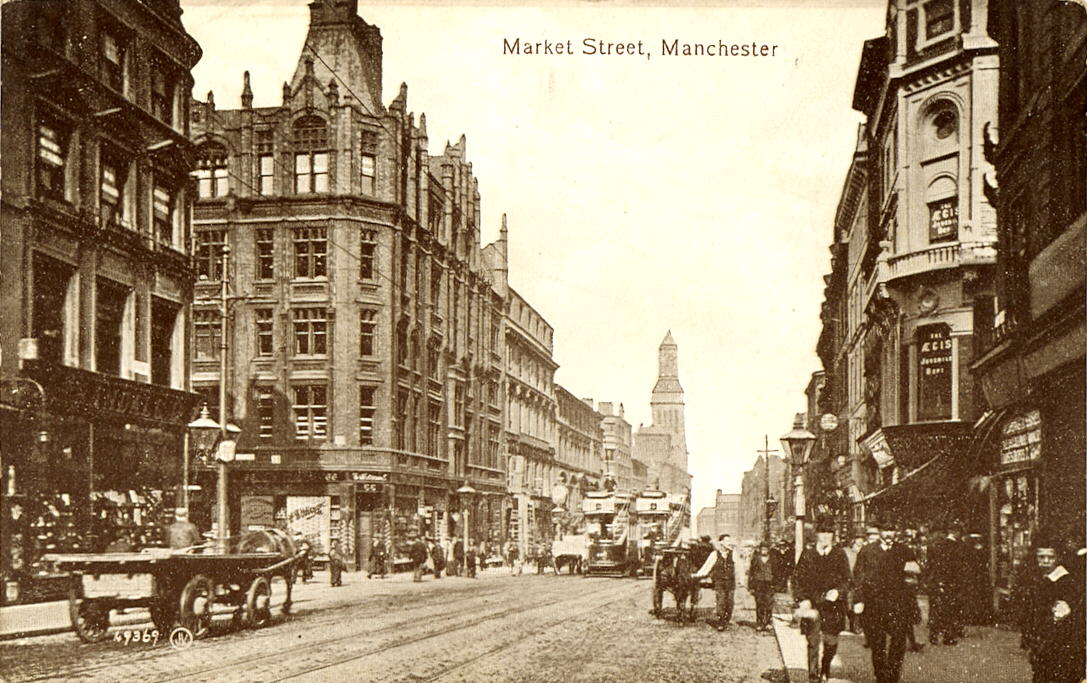
Market Street in the late 19th century (original date unknown)

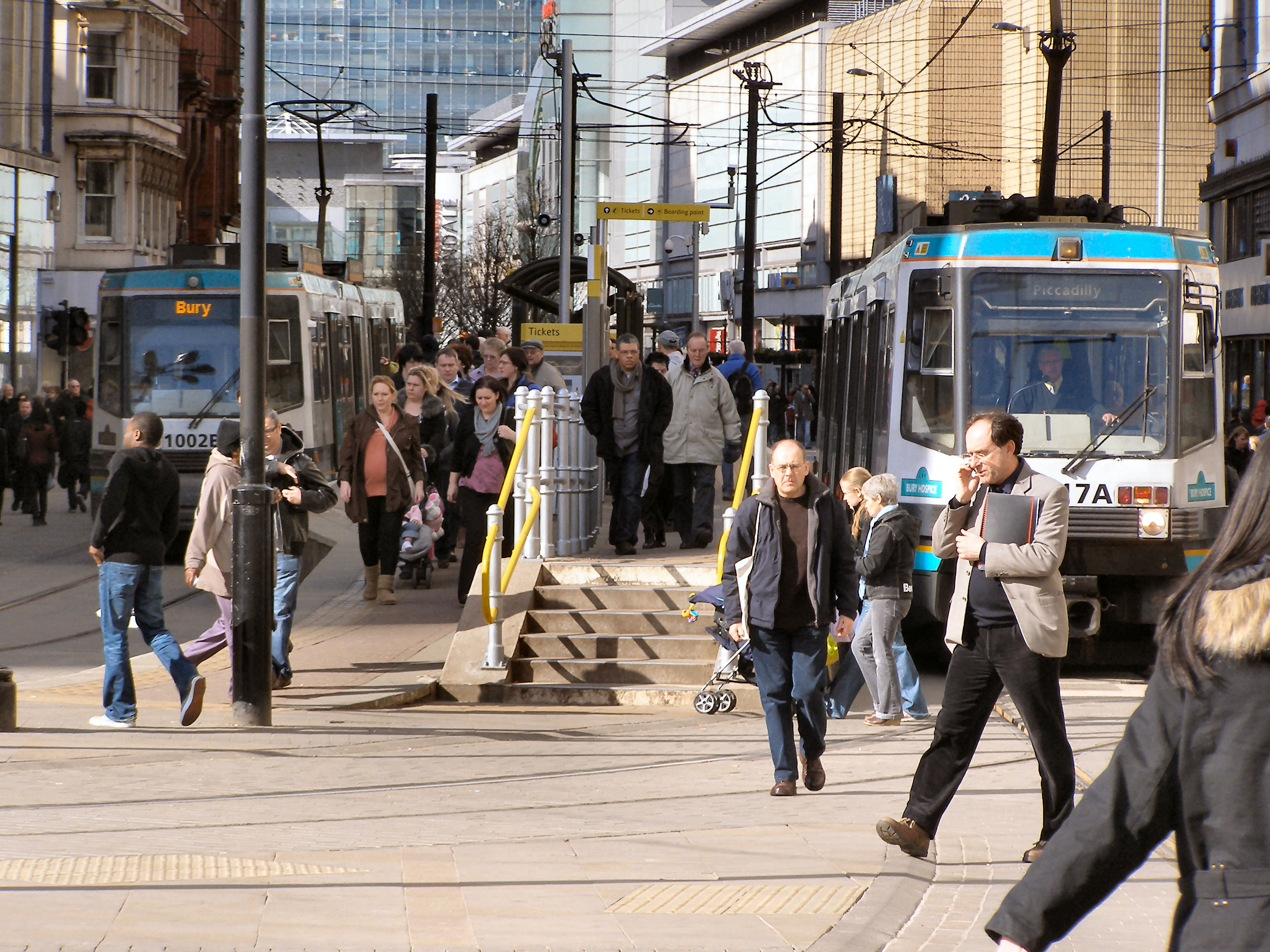
Market Street tram stop, with two T68 trams in the station

Market Street is one of the principal retail streets in Manchester, England. It runs from its junction with Piccadilly and Mosley Street, close to Piccadilly Gardens, in the east to where it meets St. Mary's Gate at the crossroads with Exchange Street and New Cathedral Street in the west. St Mary's Gate then continues to where it meets Deansgate (A56). Other major streets crossed are High Street, Corporation Street (on the north side), Cross Street and Fountain Street (on the south side).

== History ==
Market Street in Manchester, once known as Market Stead Lane, lies along the former route of the A6 road which runs from Luton in Bedfordshire, to Carlisle in Cumbria. The A6 arrives at Manchester city centre as London Road and formerly went north-west along Piccadilly, Market Street, St. Mary's Gate and Blackfriars Street and then over the River Irwell to Blackfriars Street, Salford. Since the pedestrianisation of Market Street, the A6 disappears at the junction of Piccadilly and Oldham Street to reemerge in Salford as Chapel Street.

Some of modern Market Street is a pedestrian zone with motor vehicle access limited to the emergency services, maintenance workers and deliveries to the adjacent shops. The pedestrianisation is broken by High Street, which is open to general traffic, and the south-eastern end of the street is open to trams at the Metrolink tram stop.

== Layout and shops ==
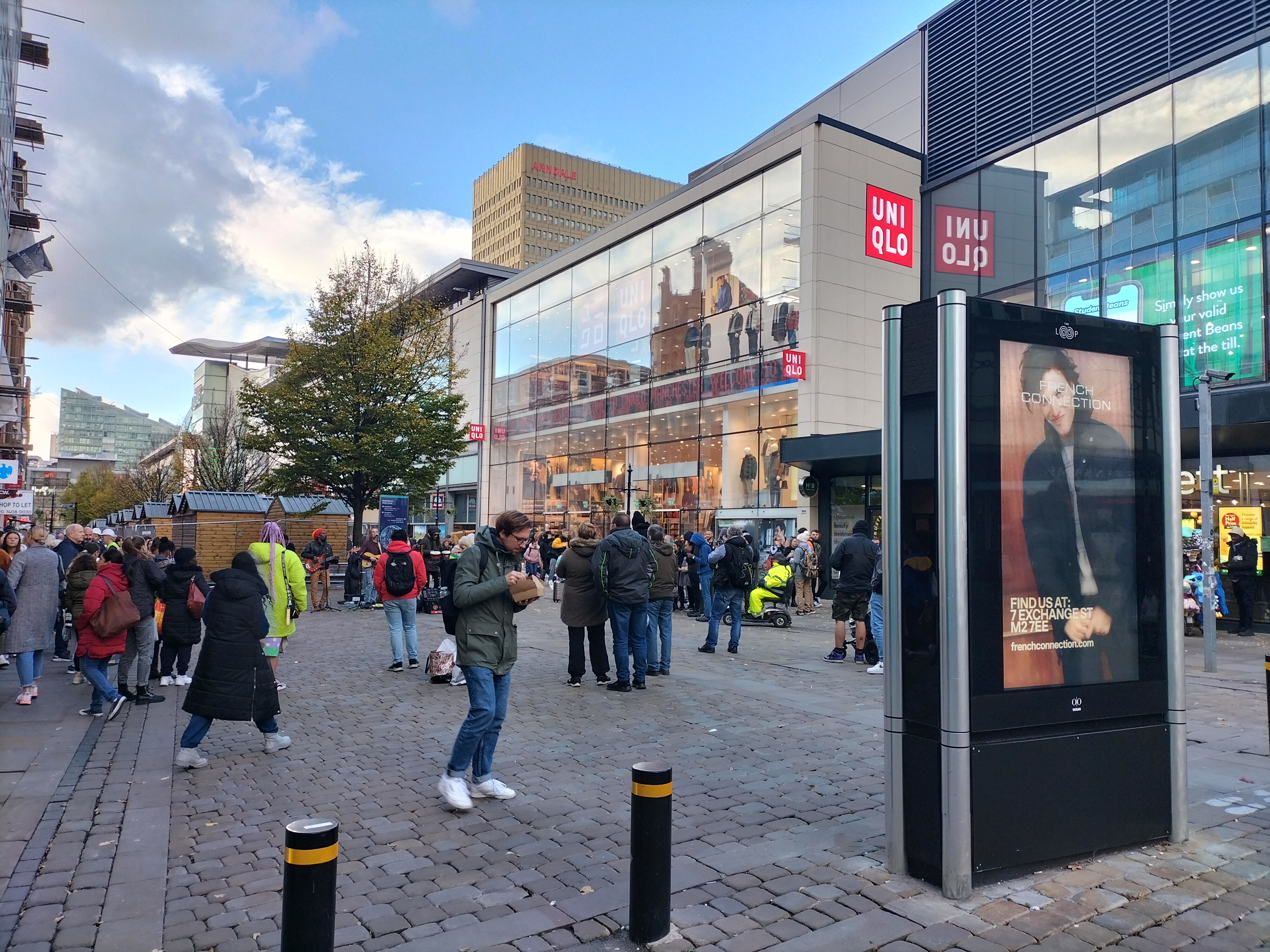
Market Street

Starting in the east at Piccadilly/Mosley Street, the street shares its space equally between pedestrian walkways and two Metrolink tram lines. Standing on opposite sides of the tram lines are two large buildings: the Rylands Building (formerly Debenhams 1973–2021, Paulden's 1957–1973, and Rylands 1932–1957) to the north and Primark (formerly Lewis's department store, 1877–2001) to the south. Moving west, the street crosses Fountain Street and High Street where the tram lines turn away towards the north.

With the removal of the tram lines, Market Street becomes an entirely pedestrian zone. Dominating the entire north side of this section is the Manchester Arndale Centre, an indoor shopping complex. A large variety of shops of various sizes line the south side of the street.

Throughout the pedestrian zone there can often be found a large number of street traders and entertainers. Such entertainers have in the past included traditional buskers, bagpipes players and string quartets.

Reaching the end of the Arndale Centre, the street crosses Corporation Street and Cross Street, ceasing to be a pedestrian zone and continues on to end where it meets St. Mary's Gate at the crossroads with Exchange Street and New Cathedral Street. This western section of Market Street is lined with a Marks & Spencer department store on its north side and another series of smaller shops to the south.

At its western end, Market Street meets St Mary's Gate, which then continues on to meet Deansgate, a former Roman road.

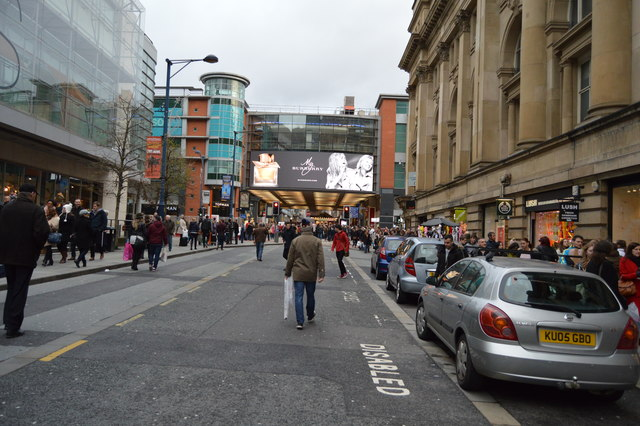
St Mary's Gate looking towards Market Street

=== Notable shops ===
List of notable stores:

==== North side ====
- Aldi
- AllSaints
- Ann Summers
- British Home Stores
- Clarks
- Debenhams (closed) (the Rylands Building)
- Marks & Spencer
- Nike
- Sports Direct
- Uniqlo
- Urban Outfitters
- Zara

==== South side ====
- Boots
- H&M
- HMV
- Mango
- Primark
- Tesco Express
- TK Maxx

N.B. Primark and TK Maxx occupy what was until 2001 the Manchester branch of Lewis's.

=== Demonstrations ===
In the 2000s, Market Street was the site of several demonstrations that attracted media attention, including a pro-Palestinian protest during the Christmas shopping period in 2004 and a large anti-war march held in Manchester ahead of the Labour Party conference in 2006. Demonstrations and protest-related vandalism have continued into the 2020s, with Greater Manchester Police involvement in several incidents. In May 2024, Palestine Action claimed responsibility for vandalising Barclays branches on Market Street and Mosley Street with red paint and smashed glass during a protest targeting the city and the bank.

=== Street performers ===
George Sampson, the 2008 winner of Britain's Got Talent, honed many of his street dancing skills on Market Street.
