= Manchester Carriage and Tramways Company =

- Type: Private
- Industry: Transport
- Founded: 1880
- Key people: John Greenwood

The Manchester Carriage and Tramways Company was incorporated in 1880, the result of a merger of the Manchester Suburban Tramways Company and the Manchester Carriage Company, to provide horse-drawn tram services throughout Manchester and Salford, England, and surrounding districts. Although the Tramways Act 1870 (33 & 34 Vict. c. 78) authorised local authorities to construct tramways, it prevented them from operating tram services, so the tramways were leased out to private companies who operated them on their behalf. Those companies also had the right to construct their own tramways.

At its greatest extent, in 1900, the Manchester Carriage and Tramways Company operated services over 140 route miles, using 515 trams and 5,244 horses housed in 19 depots across the region. The company continued to operate tram services until the end of March 1903, shortly after which it went into liquidation.

== History ==
The origins of local transport in Manchester and Salford can be traced back to John Greenwood (I) (1788–1851), who, in 1824, began what is believed to be the first omnibus service in the country, running between Pendleton, in Salford, to Manchester. It was such a success that within 25 years there were over 60 similar omnibuses vying for passengers on the main road into Manchester.

Greenwood's son, John Greenwood (II) (1818–1886), inherited the business on his father's death in 1851, by which time the business owned almost 200 horses. Mounting competition, led to negotiations between the main rivals and on 1 March 1865, the Manchester Carriage Company was formed, with John Greenwood (II) as its first managing director. The company brought together a number of coach and omnibus proprietors, of which the Greenwood family were the largest.

When the Tramways Act 1870 (33 & 34 Vict. c. 78) became law, the neighbouring councils of Manchester and Salford entered into negotiations for the provision of a tramway connecting the two towns. In 1875 powers were granted for construction to begin and, on Friday 18 May 1877 public services commenced. As the 1870 act precluded operation of tramways by local authorities, the services were operated on behalf of the two town councils by the Manchester Carriage Company. This restriction was later removed by the Tramways Act 1886, and both authorities made plans to seek powers to operate the tramways themselves. The Manchester Carriage Company's lease of the Salford lines expired in 1898, but they were granted an extension so that the lease expired at the same time as that of neighbouring Manchester, on 27 April 1901.

Manchester Carriage and Tramways Company Act 1880
- Act of Parliament
- Parliament of the United Kingdom
- Long title: An Act for dissolving the Manchester Carriage Company, Limited, and re-incorporating the Members thereof as a new Company, and for transferring to such new Company the powers conferred by the Manchester Suburban Tramways Acts, 1878 and 1879, and the Manchester Suburban Tramways Orders, 1877 and 1878; and for conferring further powers for the construction of new and the completion of authorised Tramways; and for other purposes.
- Citation: 43 & 44 Vict. c. cxii

Dates
- Royal assent: 2 August 1880

Other legislation
- Relates to: Manchester Suburban Tramways Act 1878; Manchester Suburban Tramways Act 1879

Text of statute as originally enacted

In 1880, a further consolidation took place, creating the Manchester Carriage and Tramways Company from a merger of the Manchester Carriage Company and the Manchester Suburban Tramways Company. Both companies had largely the same directors, so the merger allowed them to regularise their position. The enabling act of Parliament, the Manchester Carriage and Tramways Company Act 1880 (43 & 44 Vict. c. cxii) allowed the new company to construct new tramways in and around Manchester and Salford, and to operate the tramways built by the local authorities on their behalf. The company's first directors were the directors of the old Manchester Carriage Company: John Greenwood, Charles Sydney Grundy, Robert Neill, Benjamin Whitworth, James Holden, John Haworth, and Daniel Busby. Each was required to have a personal stake in the new company of at least £1,000 (about £100,000 as of 2025).

John Eades (designer of L53) was manager of the Manchester Carriage Company's coachbuilding works at Ford Lane, Pendleton, Salford from 1867 until 1903.

By 1882 the company was offering services on more than 75 miles (121 km) of track, 25 miles (40 km) of which it had built itself, 28 miles (45 km) leased from Manchester Corporation, 13 miles (21 km) from Salford, and 8 miles (13 km) from Oldham. For the lease of the Manchester tramways alone, the company paid Manchester Corporation £16,000 per annum (about £1.7 million as of 2014). At its greatest extent in 1900, the company operated services over 140 route miles in Manchester, Salford, Patricroft, Oldham, Stalybridge and Stockport, using 515 trams, 5,244 horses, and 19 depots organised into 8 operating divisions.

As the 19th century drew to a close, many corporations obtained permission to take over local tramways and run them as corporation transport. This coincided with the introduction of electricity, and the possibility of replacement of the horse-powered tramways.

In the event, due to a misunderstanding in the valuation of the company's assets, Salford Corporation was unable to conclude its takeover of services in its area, until 1 May 1901. The following day, the corporation acquired 94 of the company's horse-tramcars, along with 906 horses; the first Salford Corporation operated tramcar service left Pendleton at 4:30 am that morning.

The company continued to operate horse tram services from Manchester to Hollinwood, Ashton, and Stalybridge until 31 March 1903, the last horse-drawn tramcars in Manchester. The company was liquidated in 1903, and its assets, amounting to £1,167,965 (about £123 million as of 2025) were distributed to its shareholders. That same year a private vehicle hire operation, The Manchester Carriage Company (1903) was formed, led by John Greenwood (III). This company survived into the 1970s, based at one time in Middleton, and later in Rusholme.

== Depots and works ==
The company had 19 depots:

- Ford Lane Works & Head Office, Pendleton
- Church St, Pendleton
- Higher Broughton
- Bradford, Manchester
- Harpurhey, Manchester
- Newton Heath, Manchester
- Lower Broughton Road
- Crumpsall, Manchester
- Rusholme, Manchester (Moss Lane East)
- Hollinwood, Oldham
- Cowhill La, Ashton
- Stockport Road, Longsight
- Openshaw, Manchester
- Grey Street, Longsight
- Weaste, Salford
- Chorlton Road, Manchester (Hulme)
- Stretford, Manchester
- All Saints, Manchester
- Withington Road, Manchester (Range Road, Whalley Range)
- Collyhurst (Queens Park), Manchester

== Surviving vehicles ==
=== L2 ===
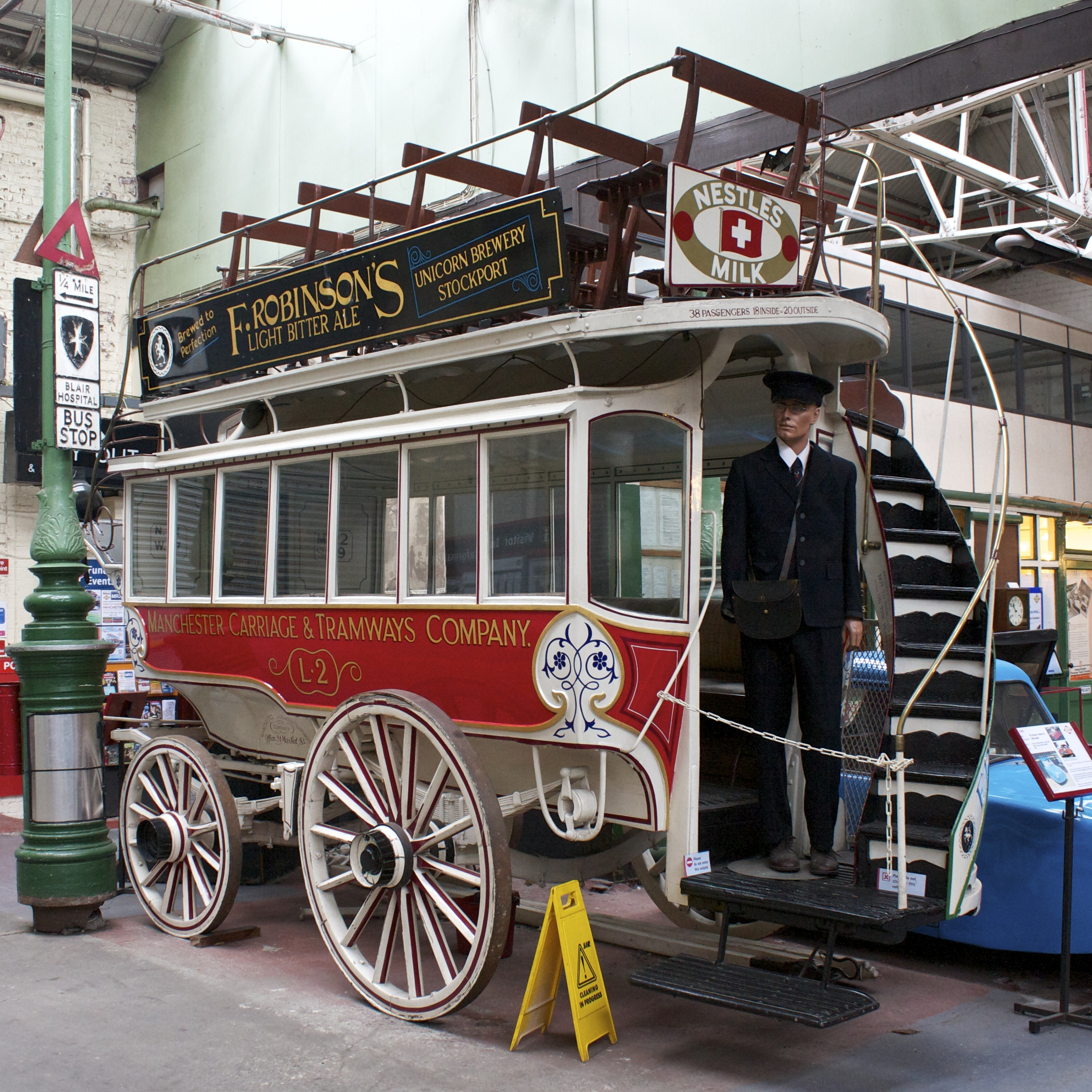
L2 at the Museum of Transport, Greater Manchester.

The company's only surviving horse-drawn omnibus, now to be found in the collection of the Manchester Museum of Transport. This particular example is believed to have been built in 1890, and finally withdrawn from service in 1914. It has undergone a number of refurbishments.

=== L53 ===
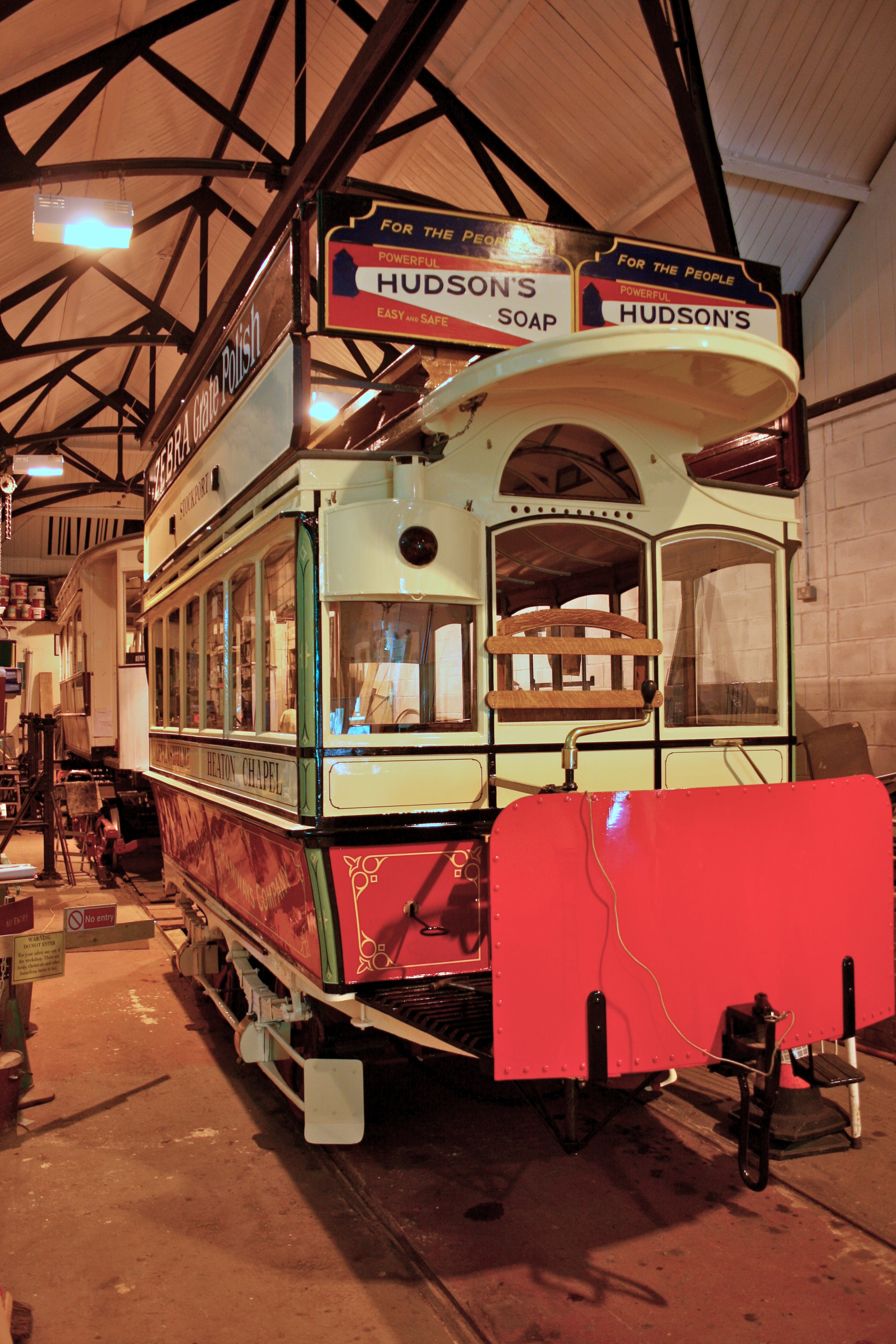
L53 at Heaton Park.

L53 is the only surviving complete horse tram, from over 500 designed by John Eades in 1877 and built by the Company to operate in and around the city until 1903. Built to the Eades patent Reversible type, the tram is unique among all surviving trams in that it uses the horses' own power to turn the body of the tram round on its underframe when reaching the end of the tracks. Rescued from a retirement near Glossop Derbyshire, that included use as a hairdresser's and a fish and chip shop, the tram was restored over a 25-year period by a team of skilled volunteers which included most of the side frames being made by one of the team as part of an 'A' Level woodwork exam.

=== 173 ===
Although not constructed by the company, this vehicle was built by Brush to the pattern of a prototype car constructed by the company, as part of a series of prototypes built by a number of different manufacturers to find the most suitable types for Manchester use.

== See also ==
- History of public transport authorities in Manchester
- Manchester Corporation Tramways
