= 1830 warehouse, Liverpool Road railway station =

Warehouse in Manchester, England

Coordinates: 53.4774°N 2.2578°W

1830 warehouse
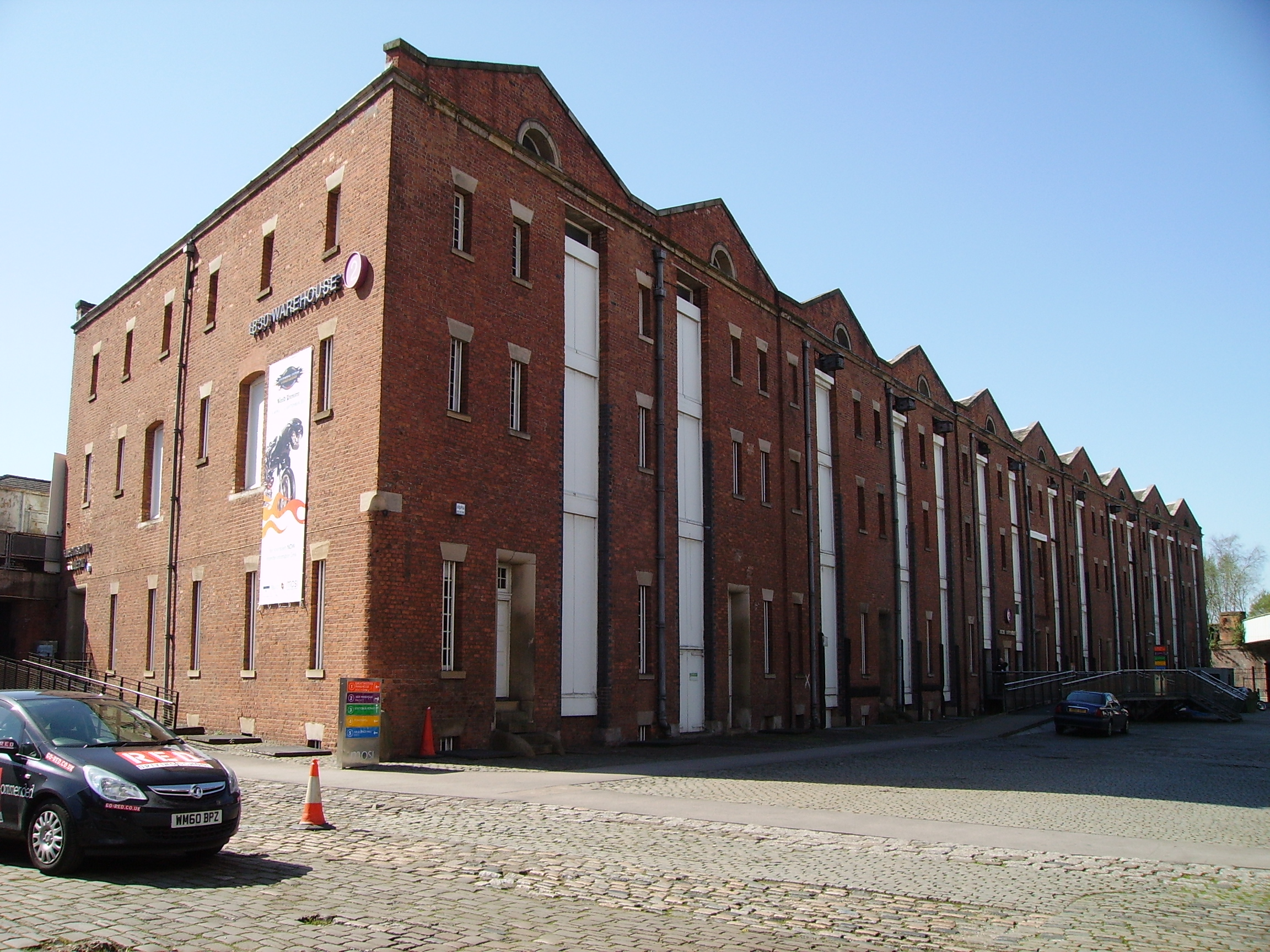
- 1830 warehouse, Liverpool Road
- Interactive map of the 1830 warehouse area

General information
- Location: Liverpool Road, Manchester, England
- Year built: 1830

Design and construction
- Designations

Listed Building – Grade I
- Official name: Old Warehouse to north of Former Liverpool Road railway station
- Designated: 7 May 1973
- Reference no.: 1282991

The 1830 warehouse, Liverpool Road, Manchester, England, is a 19th-century warehouse that forms part of the Liverpool Road railway station complex. It was built in five months between April and September 1830, "almost certainly [to the designs of] the Liverpool architect Thomas Haigh". The heritage listing report attributes the work to George Stephenson and his son, Robert. It has been listed Grade I on the National Heritage List for England since May 1973.

The warehouse is of "red brick in Flemish bond, with sandstone dressings and slate roofs". It is three storeys high, though only two storeys present to the level of the railway to allow for direct loading and unloading. At the ground floor at street level, carts could also gain direct access. "The internal structure is of timber, but with cast-iron columns in the basement."

The processing of goods within the warehouse was originally a manual operation but "steam-powered hoists [were] installed within a year as the manual system could not cope with the volume of goods". The steam system of 1831 was replaced with a hydraulic system between 1866 and 1880 to increase efficiency.

Restoration of the warehouse was undertaken in 1992–96 by the Building Design Partnership.

In 2012, the Science and Industry Museum became custodians of the warehouse. As of 2024, the museum is embarking on a phased programme of conservation work to the 1830 warehouse, having undertaken repairs to improve the structural integrity of the building and roof repairs.

== Gallery ==
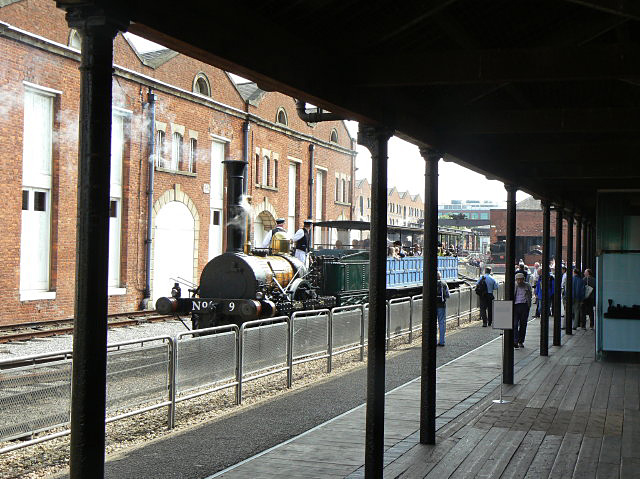
A view from the original 1830 platform of the Liverpool Road terminus, with the replica locomotive 'Planet' and carriages, and original 1830 warehouse behind, 2009

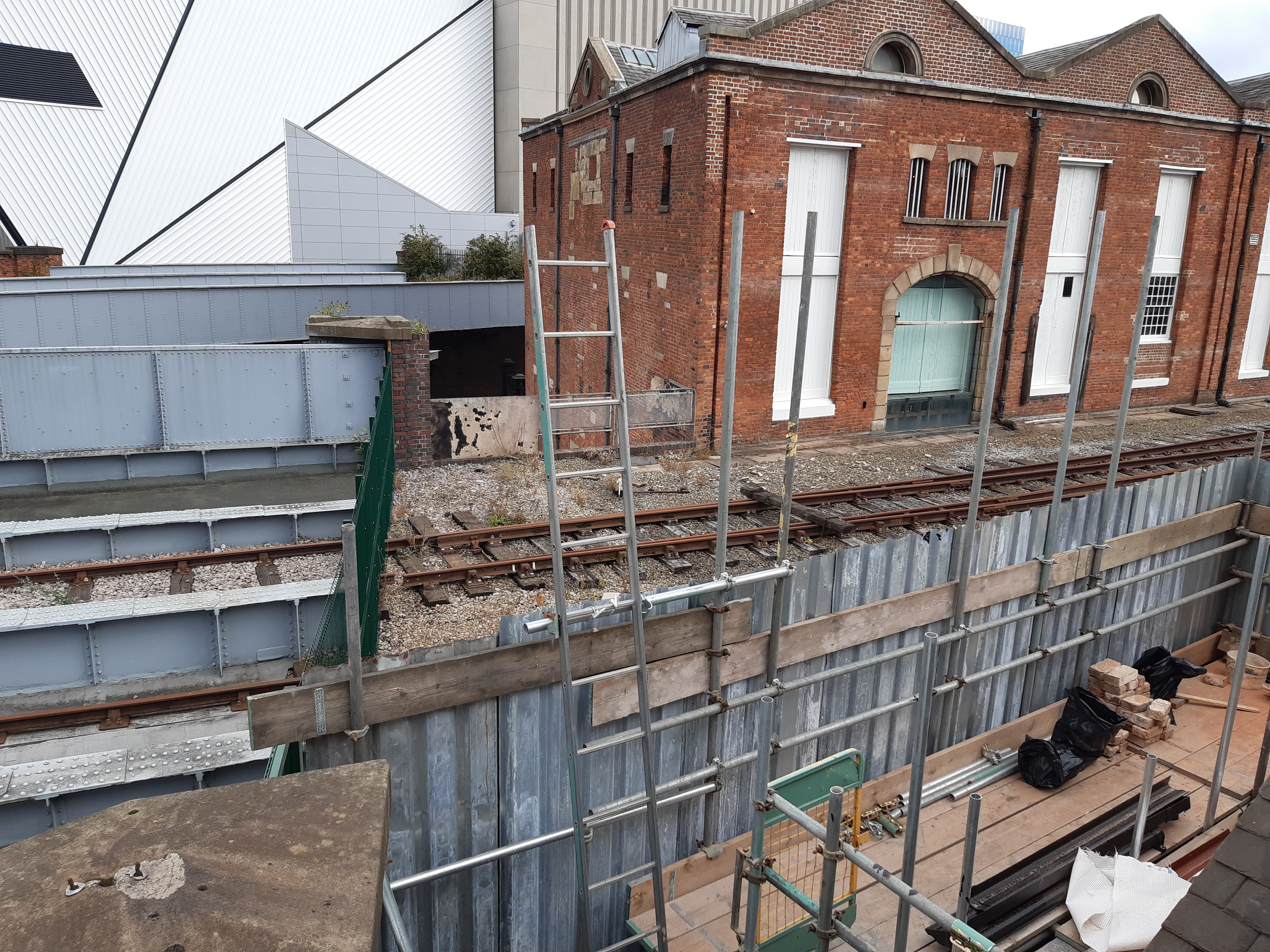
View of the western end of the warehouse, with a corner of Factory International in the background, 2023

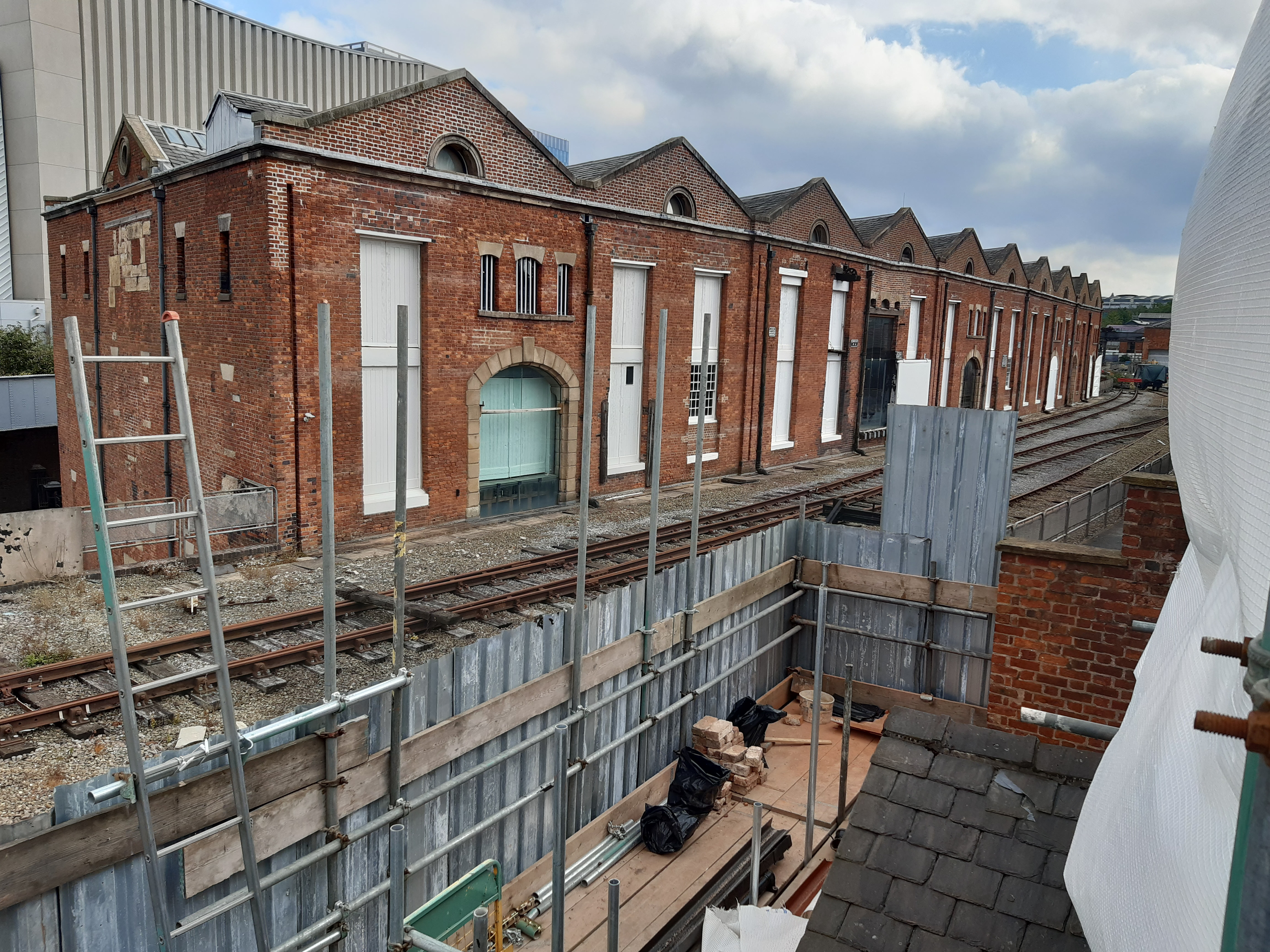
The warehouse fronting the railway, 2023

== See also ==
- Grade I listed buildings in Greater Manchester
- Listed buildings in Manchester-M60
