= Manchester Suburban Tramways Company =

The Manchester Suburban Tramways Company (MSTC) was set up in 1877 to provide horse-drawn tram services throughout Manchester and Salford, in England. The company's first tram service, which was also a first for Manchester, ran on 17 May 1877. The MSTC was merged with the Manchester Carriage Company in 1880 to form the Manchester Carriage and Tramways Company. The initial board of directors comprised Daniel Busby, William Turton, John Greenwood (1818–86), and Benjamin Whitworth.

== See also ==
- History of public transport authorities in Manchester
- Manchester Corporation Tramways
