= Manchester Liverpool Road railway station =

Former railway station in Manchester, England

Liverpool Road
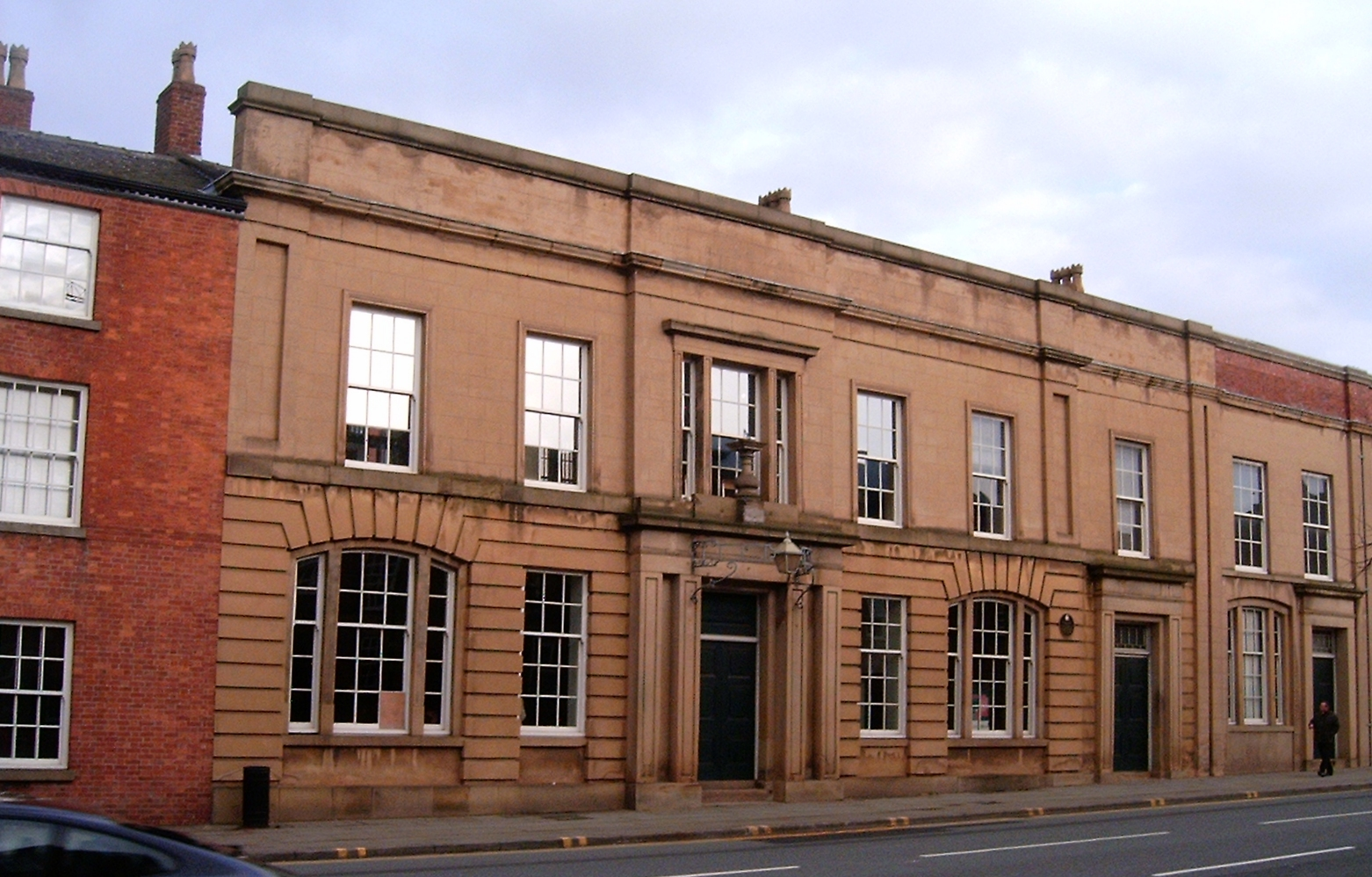
- The station frontage in 2008.

General information
- Location: Castlefield, Manchester; England
- Coordinates: 53.4772°N 2.2583°W
- Grid reference: SJ831978
- Platforms: 2

Other information
- Status: Disused

History
- Original company: Liverpool and Manchester Railway

Key dates
- 15 September 1830: Opened: passenger services
- 4 May 1844: Closed: passenger services
- 1975: Closed: goods yard

Listed Building – Grade I
- Official name: Former Liverpool Road Railway Station and Station Masters House
- Designated: 18 December 1963
- Reference no.: 1291477
Location

Liverpool Road is a former railway station on the Liverpool and Manchester Railway in Manchester, England. It is a Grade I listed building and is now part of the Science and Industry Museum. It is the world's oldest surviving terminal railway station. With tracks running at a first floor level behind the building, it could also be considered one of the world's first elevated railway stations.

Purpose-built to be the Manchester terminus for the world's first inter-city passenger railway using time-tabled steam locomotives, Liverpool Road opened on 15 September 1830. A warehouse exists on the opposite side of the tracks which was opened at the same time. Within weeks of opening, greater than anticipated demand from both passenger and freight users had saturated the station's capacity, leading to rapid growth of both the facility itself and adjacent warehousing. Additional passenger amenities were built during the late 1830s to accommodate services to Birmingham Curzon Street and London Euston via the Grand Junction Railway. Liverpool Road was perminantly closed to passenger services on 4 May 1844, when the line was extended to join the Manchester and Leeds Railway at Hunt's Bank. By this point, Liverpool Road was superseded by the larger and newer Manchester Victoria station for passenger services.

Despite the loss of passenger services, akin to its counterpart at Liverpool Crown Street, Liverpool Road was converted into a goods yard. Under the ownership of multiple companies, including the London and North Western Railway, London Midland and Scottish Railway, and British Railways, it continued to operate through to 1975. Three years later, the station building and adjacent historic railway warehouses were purchased by the Greater Manchester Council to house the Science and Industry Museum, which opened on the site on 15 September 1983. Since Liverpool Road ceased operation, the oldest railway station in use is Broad Green railway station in Liverpool which opened on 15 September 1830. The Liverpool and Manchester Railway opened starting from Liverpool Crown Street, hence the older stations start from Liverpool.

== Construction ==
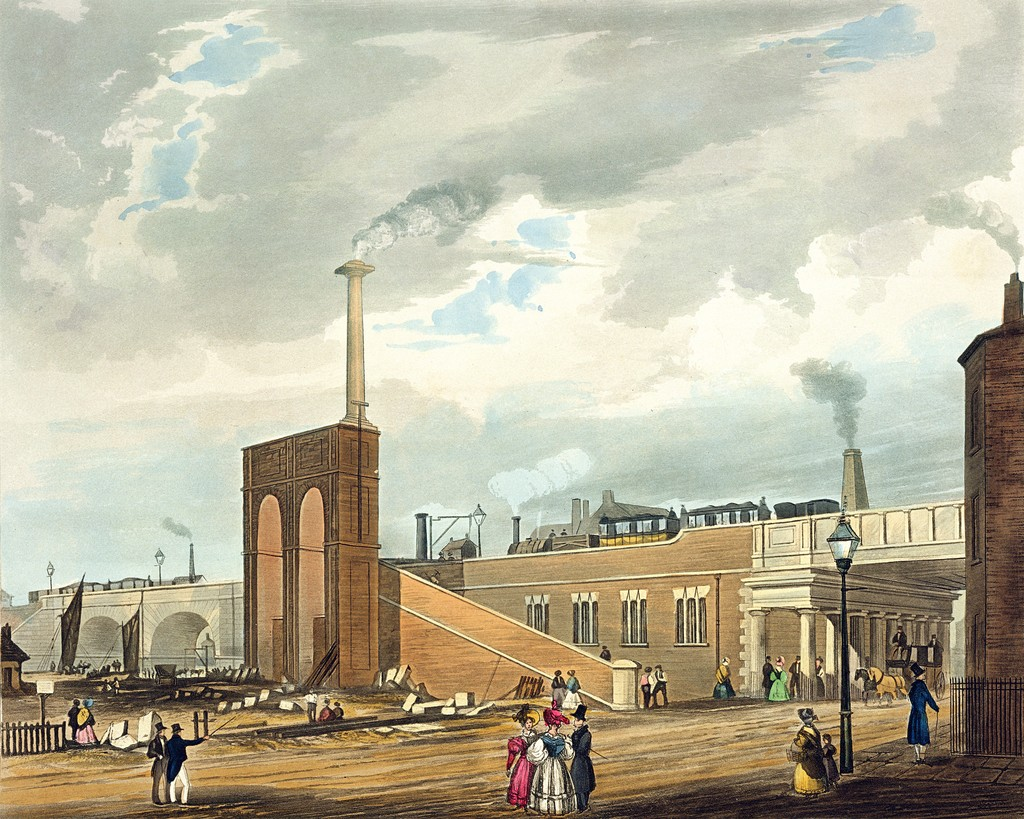
1833 view of the bridges over the Irwell and Water Street

As a consequence of opposition from the proprietors of the Mersey and Irwell Navigation, it had been intended to terminate the railway on the Salford side of the Irwell. A last minute agreement brought about a change in plan; the river would be spanned by a two arched stone bridge, incorporating a cart road for the use of the Navigation company. Another bridge was required to cross Water Street. However, the levels would not permit an arched bridge to the dimensions demanded by the Manchester Highway Commissioners. The only alternative was a flat span across a distance that was judged to be too wide. William Fairbairn, in the quest to perfect fireproof mill flooring, had developed a parabolic 'T' section girder that could span such a distance. Thus, the Water Street bridge might be said to be the first modern girder bridge.

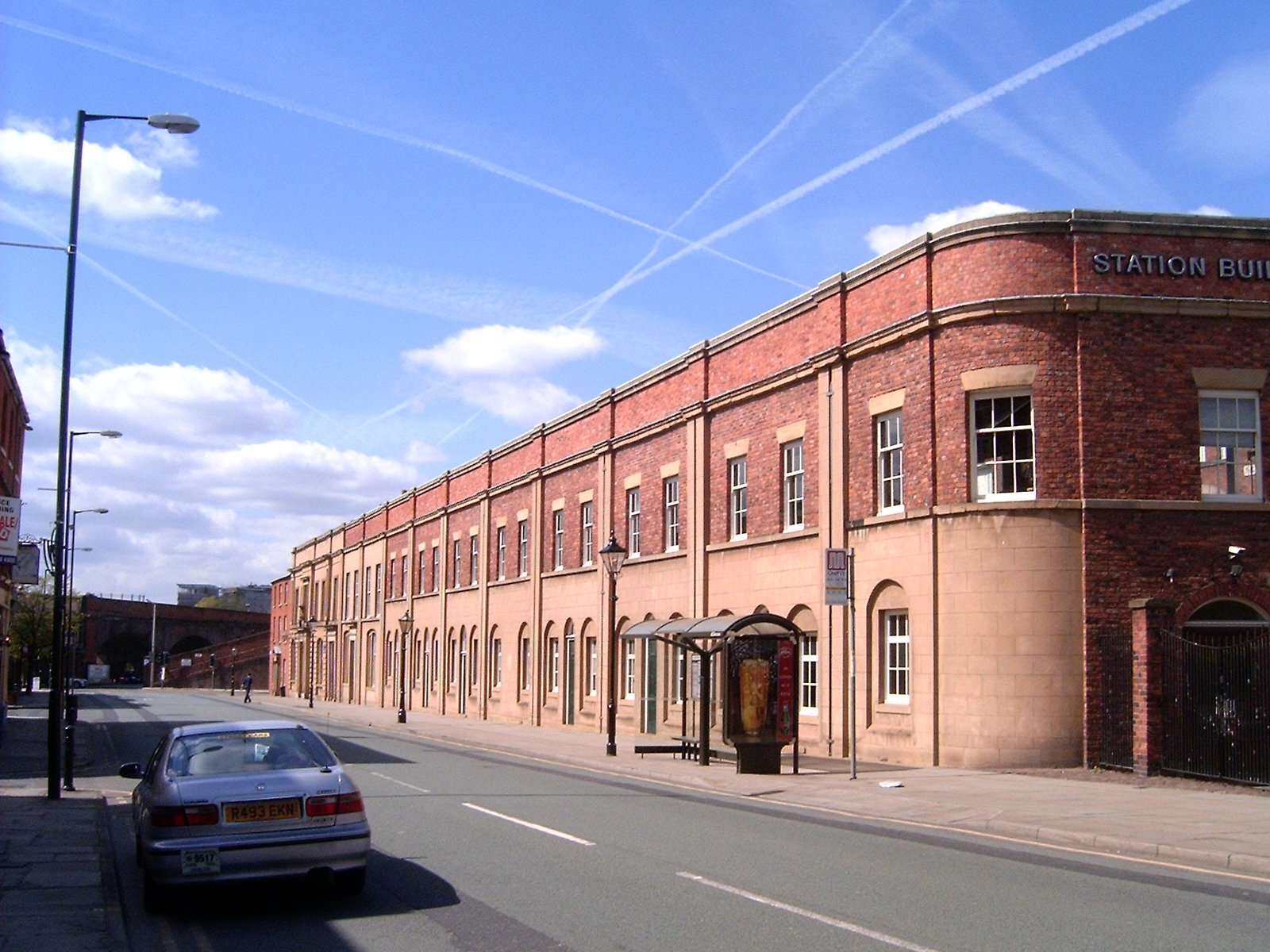
Liverpool Road railway station, Manchester

The station itself comprised a slightly curved brick viaduct that terminated in the slope that led up from Water Street to Deansgate, alongside Liverpool Road. The viaduct fronted a solid brick warehouse, a construction that owed much to canal warehouses, beyond which was a low-level yard that was excavated into the hillside. There was a wooden transit shed at the viaduct end, on the corner of Liverpool Road and Byrom Street and turnplates gave access to coal drops at the end of the yard. Of course, at that time, goods traffic was considered the most important potential source of income, and for this, the terminus was well placed in the midst of the Castlefield canal and warehousing complex.

Provision for the passengers was something of an afterthought. An existing house on the corner of Liverpool Road and Water Street was purchased for the use of the 'Station Agent'. A brick structure was erected next to it, incorporating elaborate door and window surrounds, the whole being finished in stucco rendering, scored to imitate stonework. To aid passengers in keeping track of the time, a sundial was built over the first class entrance.

== Passenger services ==
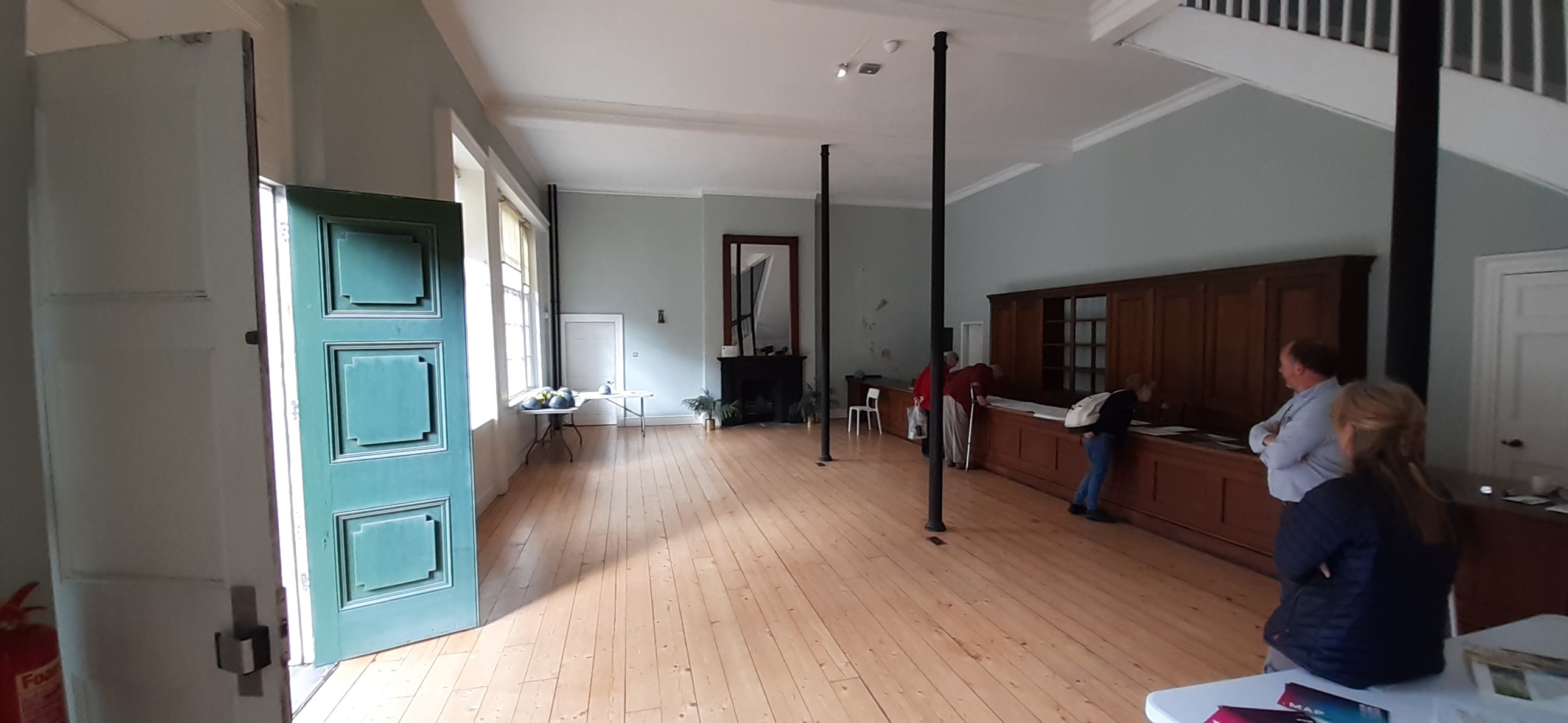
Ground floor interior of Liverpool Road railway station during a Heritage Open Day in 2023

The railway only carried first and second class passengers, and each class had its own booking hall and waiting room. As the station was some distance from the centre of Manchester, most passengers purchased a handwritten ticket from an agent at an inn or hotel. Several routes of horse-drawn omnibuses then conveyed them to the station. A clerk in the booking hall exchanged the ticket for a counterfoil, similar to a modern airline boarding pass, and made up a waybill from the ticket information for the train guard. The train guard thus had a passenger list indicating class of travel and destination, this was the only check against fraud.

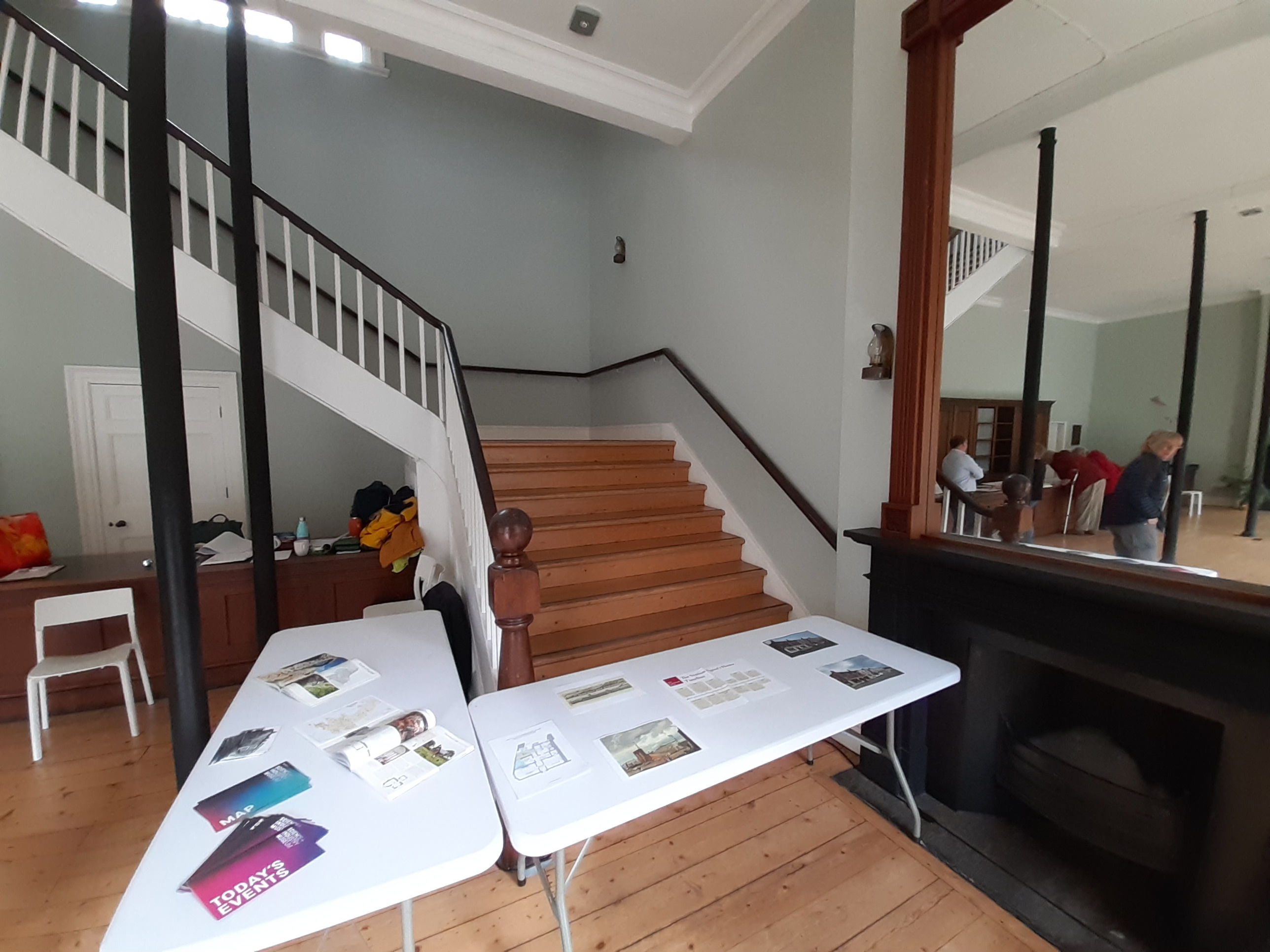
Staircase to the waiting room

The passengers proceeded upstairs to the waiting room, and licensed "outdoor porters" took charge of their luggage, being paid a set scale of fees. "Indoor porters" took charge of the luggage on the station platform and strapped it to the carriage roofs. The ringing of the station bell then announced that the passengers could go through the door on to the platform and board the train. The bell was also rung as a warning of departure, but the actual signal was given by the guard's trumpet or horn. The original bell is still exhibited in the station building. The planning of railway stations was clearly not so advanced at this time as supporting pillars of the building prevented certain carriage doors from opening fully.

== Early usage and growth ==
Within weeks of opening, nearly 800 passengers were using the railway each day, which was well in excess of expectations; furthermore, up to 2,500 travellers were passing through Liverpool Road on some days. This was partially attributable to its speed advantage, taking only one hour and 46 minutes by train to Liverpool against, a three hour stagecoach journey or 12 hours by canal. Not only was the railway faster, but it was also half the price of the stagecoach. These advantages proved to be attractive to freight operations as well; this included large amounts of cotton coming from the Liverpool Docks to Manchester's textile mills while finished textiles travelled back to Liverpool to be exported abroad. These combined demands quickly exceeded to the capacity of Liverpool Road's facilities to accommodate.

In 1831, the station buildings were extended via the construction of a simple two-road carriage shed on top of a range of rooms along Liverpool Road. These were used as a mixture of both workshops and offices. That same year, two new warehouses specifically for handling the cotton traffic were also constructed. Also in 1831, a steam engine was installed to assist workers in transferring goods around the station; prior to this, manual labour been relied upon, making use of carts and 24 gravity-assisted hoists. Hydraulic power would further aid in the movement of goods, but this would not be installed until the 1860s. Another feature was a gate and a ramp leading to viaduct level, which was used to load and unload gentlemen's carriages, which were conveyed on flat wagons, a popular form of travel for those who could afford it.

The Grand Junction Railway, Britain's first trunk line, was completed between Curzon Street railway station in Birmingham and Warrington Bank Quay railway station, Warrington, on 4 July 1837. Through trains began to convey passengers from the station to Birmingham, and a separate booking office and waiting room were provided. From 17 September 1838, there were through carriages to London Euston by some trains after completion of the London and Birmingham Railway in that year. This increase in long-distance services resulted in one of the first private railway hotels opening in Liverpool Road. Congestion required the opening of a separate arrival station across Water Street, on the site of a former dyeworks. Further goods warehouses were also erected.

== As a goods yard ==
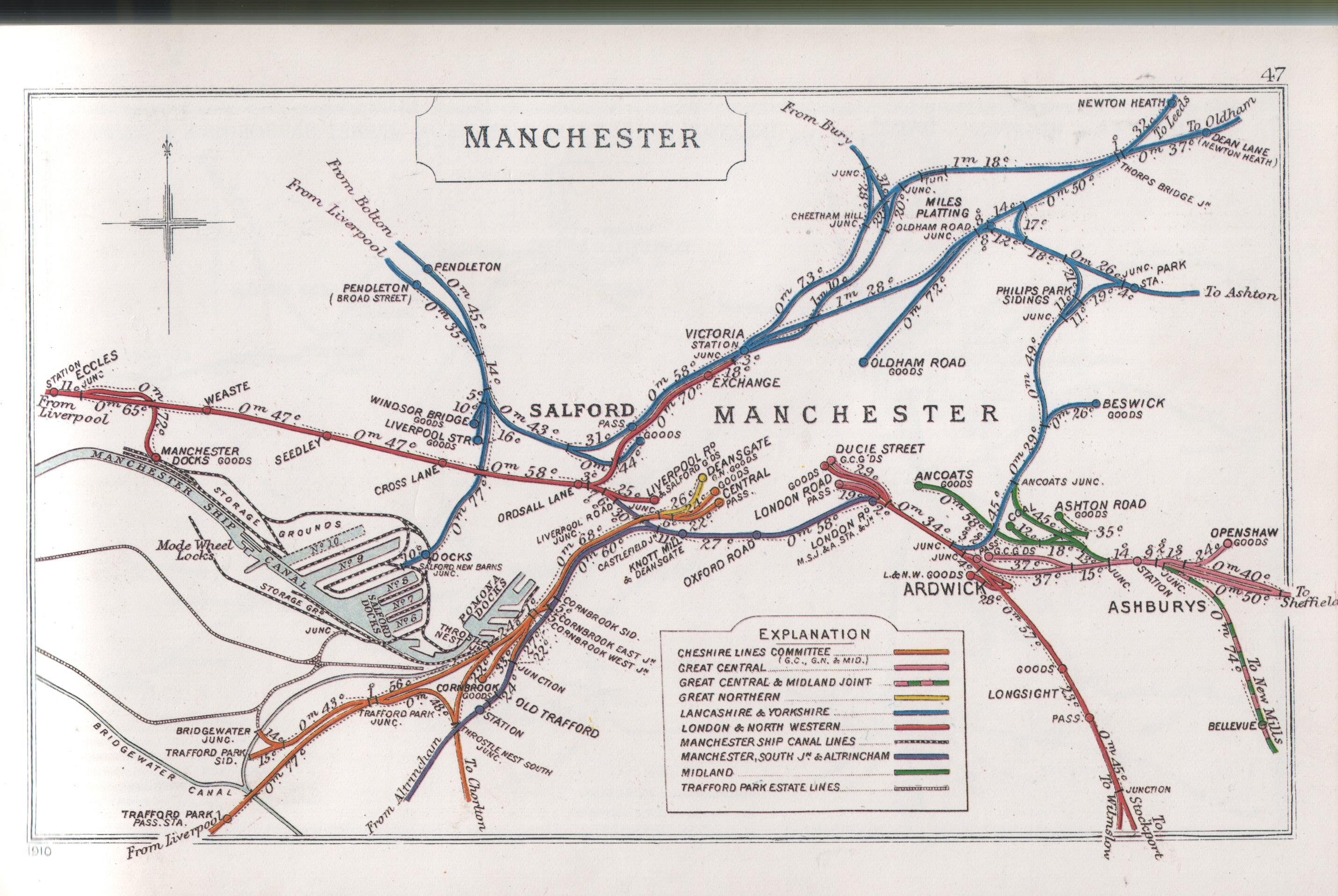
A 1910 Railway Clearing House of central Manchester showing Liverpool Road goods station served by the London & North Western Railway. The 1844 line from Ordsall to Victoria is shown in red.

Passenger services ended with the opening of an extension of the L&M line from Ordsall Lane to Hunt's Bank. From 4 May 1844, all passenger services were transferred to the new Victoria Station; thereafter, freight services continued to use Liverpool Road.

Under the ownership of the London and North Western Railway, Liverpool Road continued to be developed as a goods yard. An iron viaduct (an early girder-frame structure) was constructed to provide access to Byrom Street Warehouse; it was soon followed by the Grape Street Warehouse. In the 1880s, to accelerate transshipping operations, a steam-powered gantry crane system was installed; it was converted to electric power in the 1920s.

The goods complex remained in operation post grouping under the London Midland and Scottish Railway from 1923 to 1948. In addition to LMS goods trains, Great Western Railway locomotives worked their goods trains to Liverpool Road from Chester via Warrington. In 1948, the site was taken over by British Railways (BR) following the nationalisation of the UK railway system.

== Closure and redevelopment ==
During 1975, BR ceased all use of both the station and the associated warehouses. Shortly thereafter, the Grape Street Warehouse and surroundings buildings were purchased by Granada Television. Part of it was used for the Granada Studios Tour theme attraction, and other parts were used for the set of long-running British TV soap Coronation Street.

In 1978, the Greater Manchester Council purchased the earliest part of the former Liverpool Road station from BR in exchange for the nominal sum of £1. The Museum of Science and Industry in Manchester opened at this site on 15 September 1983. Accordingly, both the station building itself and several of the adjacent historic railway warehouses presently form part of the museum, the wider area for which is now known as the Castlefield Urban Heritage Park.

== Mainline connection ==
Throughout its history, Liverpool Road station had retained a working rail connection to the operational mainline, allowing heritage trains to be run directly from the Manchester to Preston Line into the museum station. However, the Ordsall Chord rail link — a Network Rail project to create a new connection between Piccadilly and Victoria stations — involved the construction of a new bridge over the River Irwell which severed the 180-year-old link to Liverpool Road station. After this project was completed, it was no longer possible to run trains into or out of Liverpool Road station.

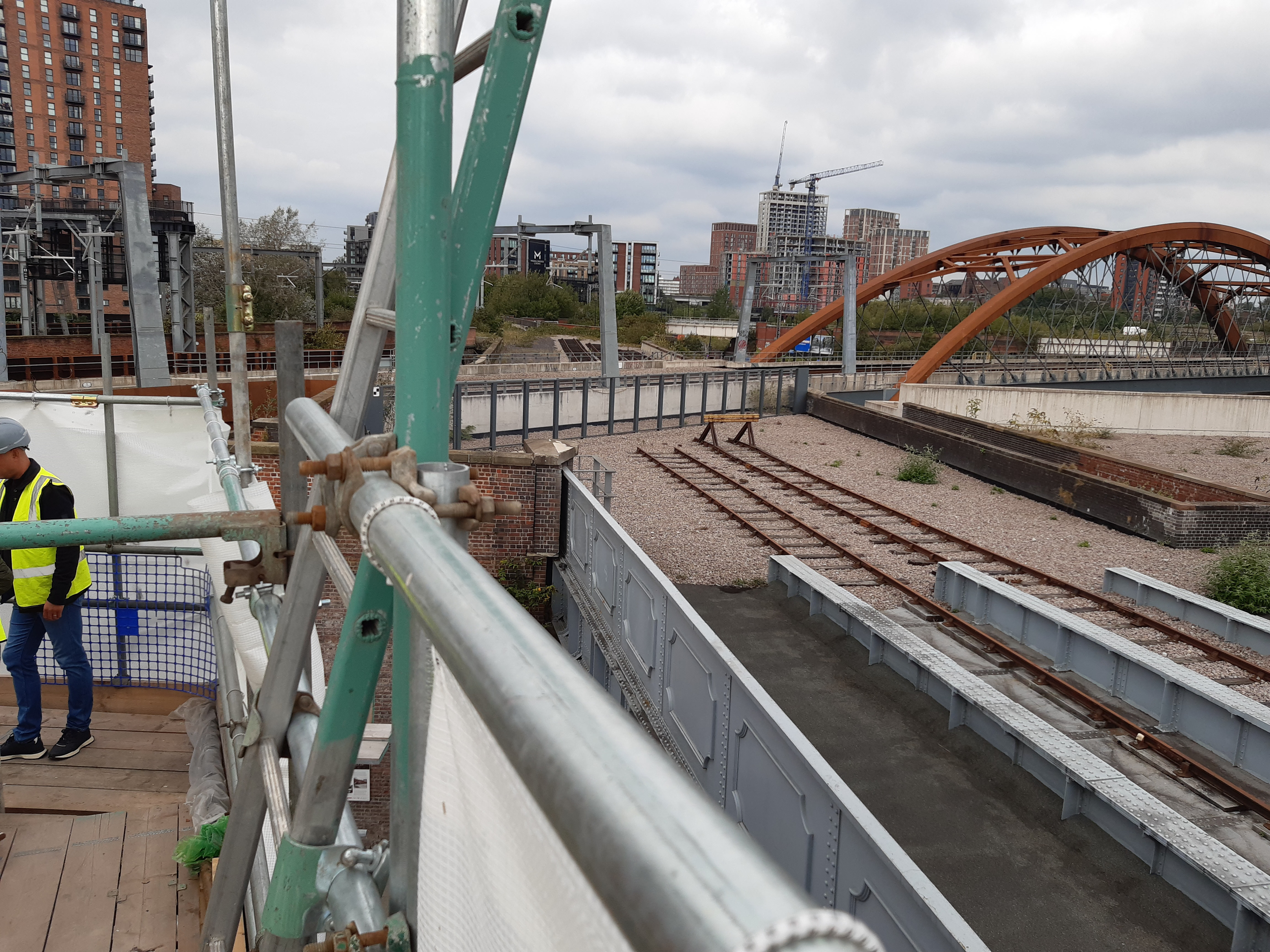
View from atop a building at Liverpool Road station, showing how the Ordsall Chord rail line (metal arch) cuts across the original track, 2023

The MOSI management had initially objected to the scheme and an inquiry was set up in 2014 to investigate the potential damage to the historic structure. In May 2014, Network Rail reached an agreement with MOSI, in which the museum was to receive an undisclosed sum in compensation, and the objection was dropped. In March 2015, Patrick McLoughlin, Secretary of State for Transport, announced that the Ordsall Chord project was to go ahead with an estimated completion date of 2017. It was confirmed that the operational rail link into Liverpool Road station would be severed as a result of this project, and later in 2015 the main line connection was removed.

== See also ==
- Grade I listed buildings in Greater Manchester
- Listed buildings in Manchester-M3

Preceding station	Disused railways	Following station
Ordsall Lane	London and North Western Railway; Liverpool and Manchester Railway	Terminus
