= John Greenwood (bus operator) =

John Greenwood (born 1788, died 1851), transport entrepreneur, was the keeper of a toll-gate in Pendleton on the Manchester to Liverpool turnpike. In 1824 he purchased a horse and a cart with several seats and began an omnibus service, probably the first one in the United Kingdom, between Pendleton and Manchester. His pioneering idea was to offer a service where, unlike with a stagecoach, no prior booking was necessary and the driver would pick up or set down passengers anywhere on request. Later on he added daily services to Buxton, Chester, and Sheffield.

John Greenwood, and a number of competitors, created a network of omnibus services, often acting as feeders to the railways. When he died in 1851 he left a flourishing business to his son, also named John (II) (b. 12 May 1818, d. 21 March 1886), which in that year became the Manchester Carriage Company.

By gestation, and amalgamation, in 1880, this became the Manchester Carriage and Tramways Company, led by John Greenwood (II). Following the council taking control of passenger transport services, in 1903, the residuary operations became The Manchester Carriage Co. (1903) Ltd, led by John Greenwood (III) (b. 1856).

For how this initial service developed, see Timeline of public passenger transport operations in Manchester.
