= History of public transport authorities in Manchester =

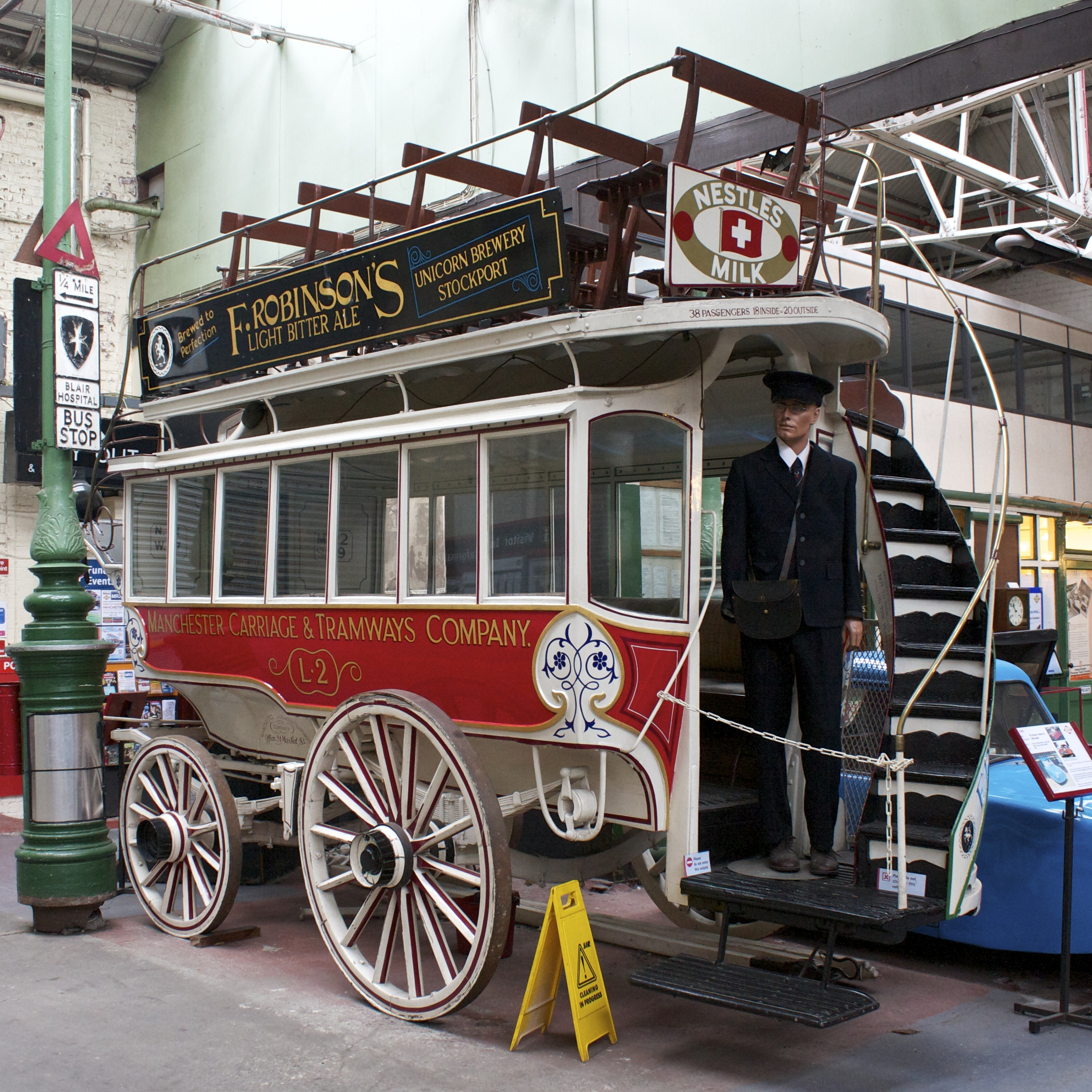
Horse-drawn omnibus operated by Manchester Carriage and Tramways Company

The history of public transport authorities in Manchester details the various organisations that have been responsible for the public transport network in and around Manchester, England, since 1824.

== Timeline ==
- On 1 January 1824, the first horse-drawn omnibus service started by John Greenwood, the proprietor of the Pendleton Toll Gates
- On 1 March 1865, the Manchester Carriage Company was formed which brought together a number of omnibus operators in the Manchester area.
- In 1880 this became the Manchester Carriage and Tramways Company with some further consolidation, including the Manchester Suburban Tramways Company.
- On 7 June 1901, Manchester Corporation Tramways Department started electric tram operations, as the public operation. The former Carriage Company was wound up in 1903
- In 1906 the first motor buses were bought.
- In 1929 the name was changed to Manchester Corporation Transport Department to reflect the changing to motor buses
- In 1938 the first trolleybus routes are opened, replacing trams
- In 1949, the last tram routes (to Stockport) were closed
- In mid-1966 the name of this public operation was changed to Manchester City Transport.
- At the end of 1966, the last trolleybus routes (to Ashton-under-Lyne) were turned over to motor bus operation
- The 24 hour clock was adopted in 1967.
- On 1 November 1969, control of Manchester City Transport and other surrounding council transport departments were transferred to South East Lancashire North East Cheshire Passenger Transport Executive (SELNEC PTE).
- On 1 April 1974, SELNEC'S operating name became Greater Manchester Transport, and its coverage was expanded. Its operations were directed from three divisional offices (central east, central north west and central south); and eight district offices: Bolton, Bury, Leigh, Oldham, Rochdale, Stockport, Tameside and Wigan.
- During 1974 Greater Manchester Transport was rebranded as the Greater Manchester Passenger Transport Executive (GMPTE). This lasted until 2011.
  - On 27 February 1986, Greater Manchester Transport's bus operation was transferred to a separate entity, Greater Manchester Buses Limited, to comply with the Transport Act 1985, adopting the GM Buses trading name.
  - On 13 December 1993, GM Buses was further split into GMB North and GMB South on an approximate geographic basis. Just under four months later they were sold to employee buy out teams.
  - In February 1996, GMB South was sold to Stagecoach Group, becoming Stagecoach Manchester.
  - In March 1996, GMB North was sold to First Bus, eventually becoming First Greater Manchester.
- In April 2011. GMPTE became Transport for Greater Manchester (TfGM).
