= Manchester =

City and metropolitan borough in England

- City and metropolitan borough
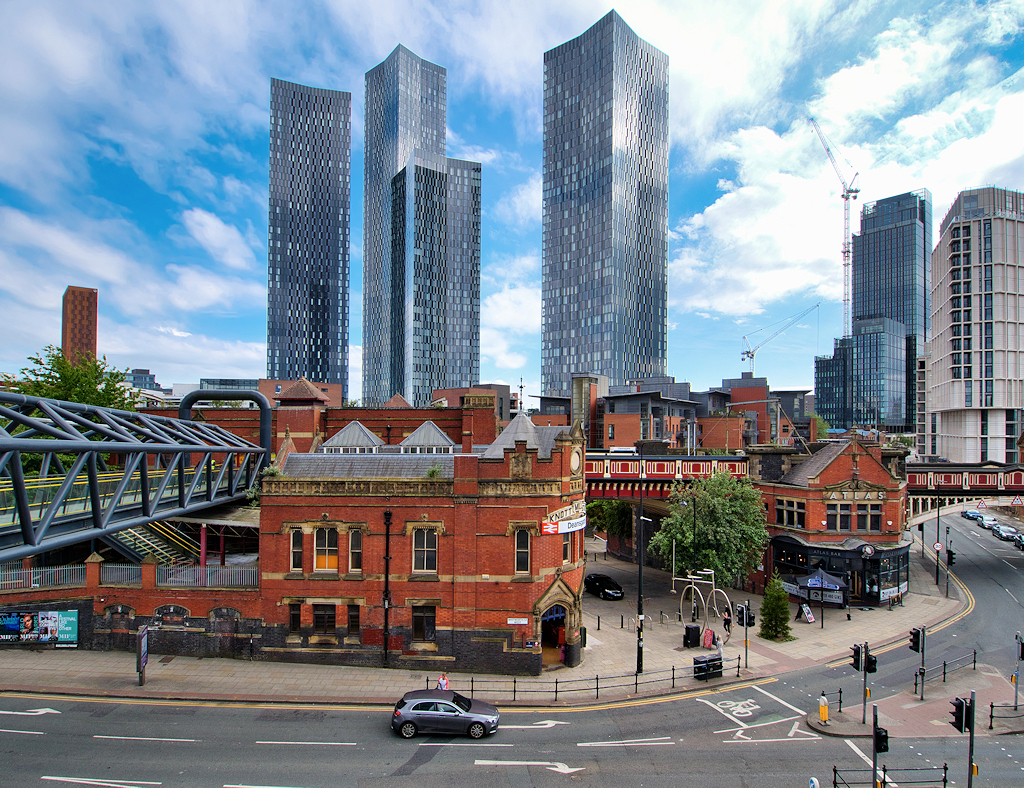
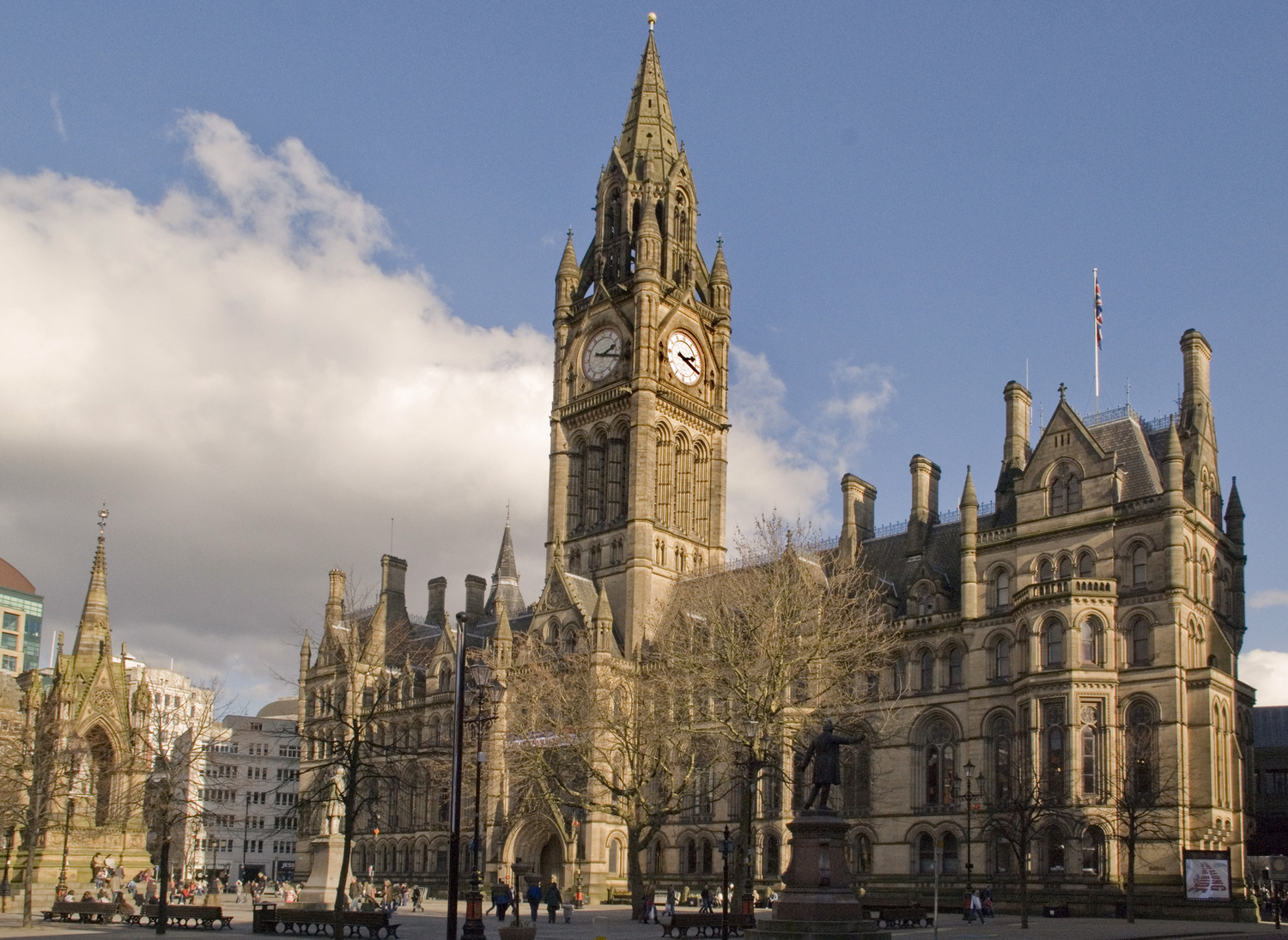
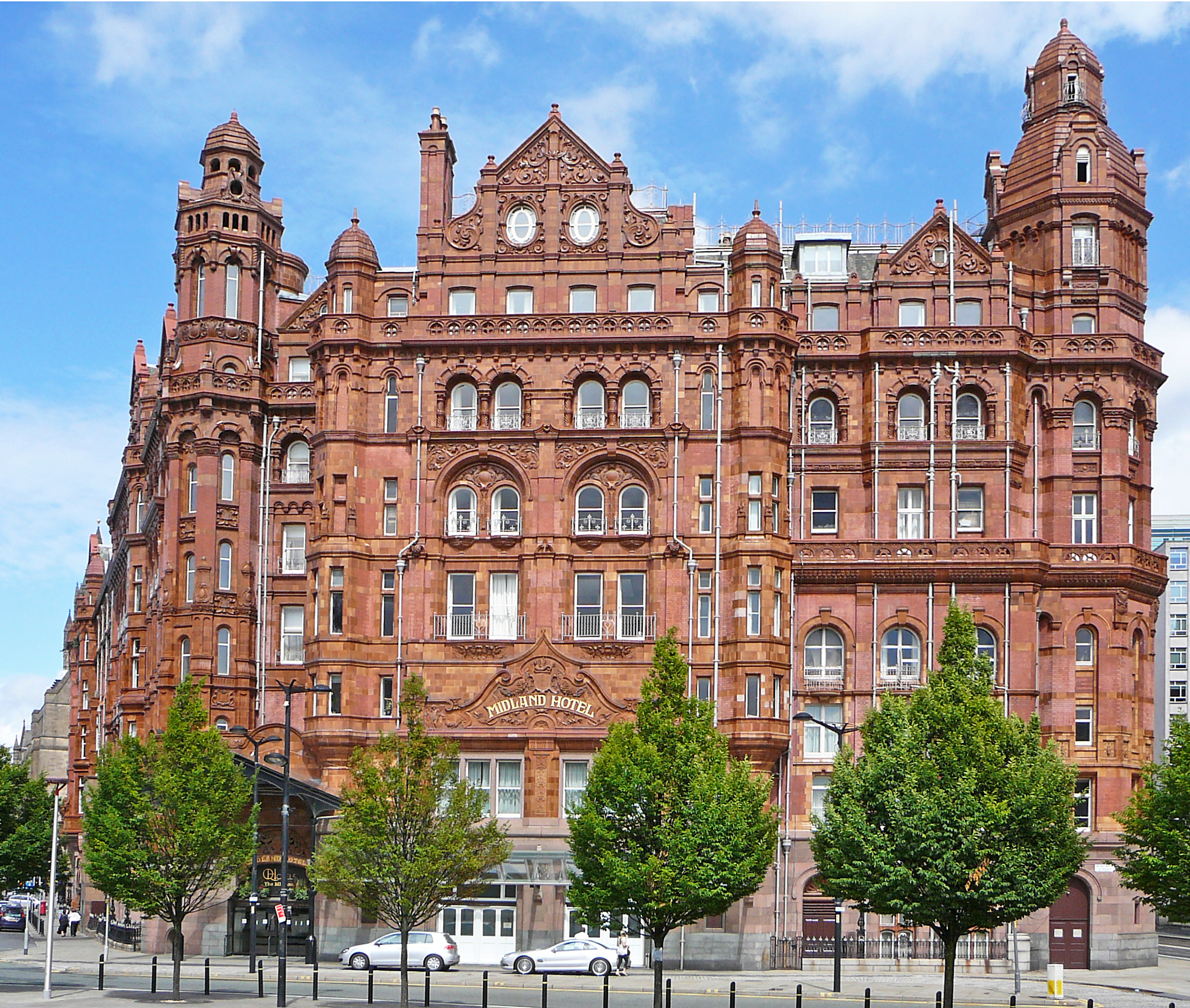
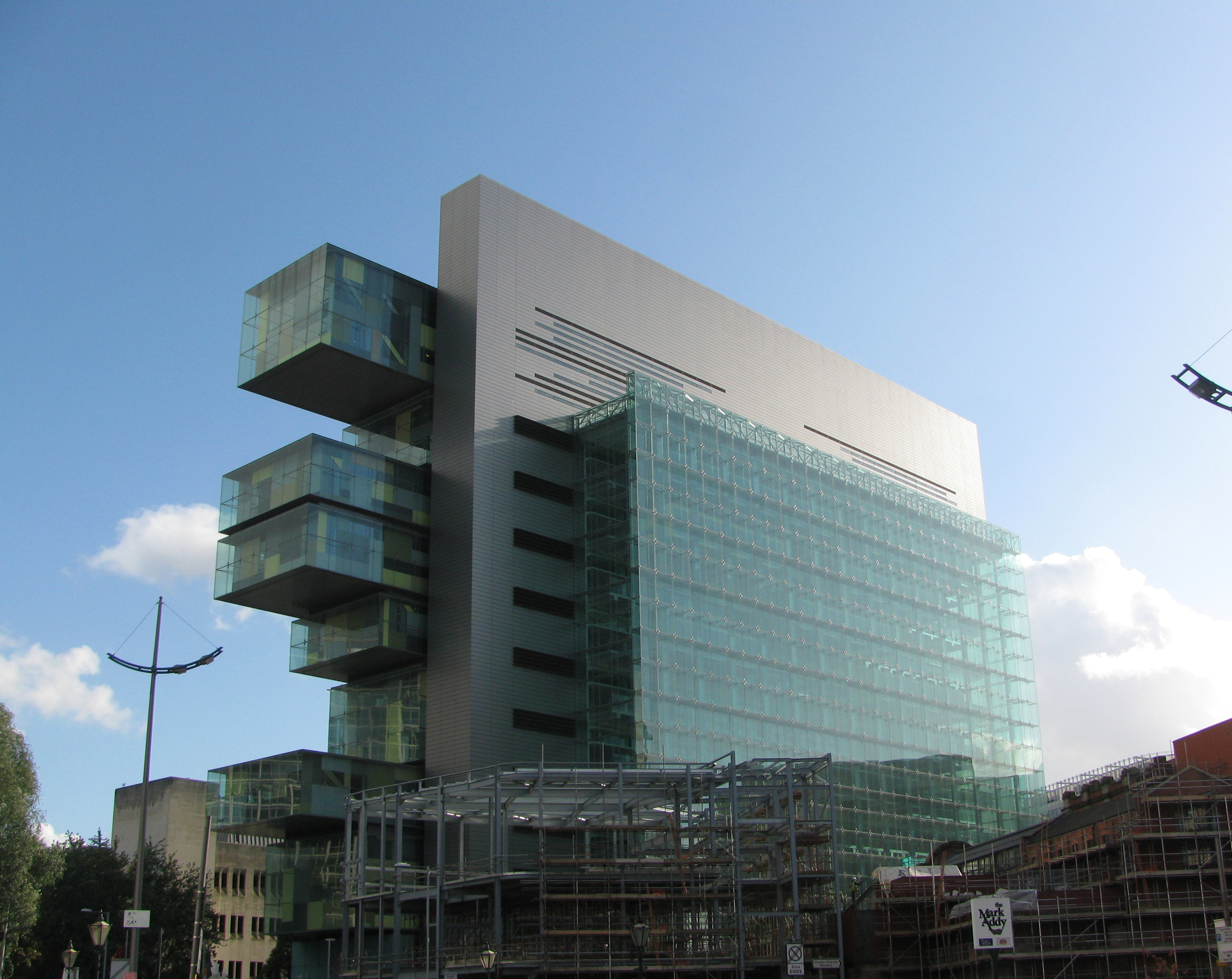
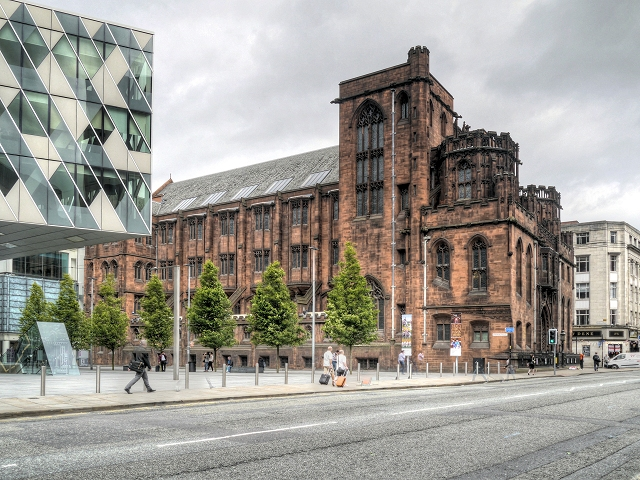
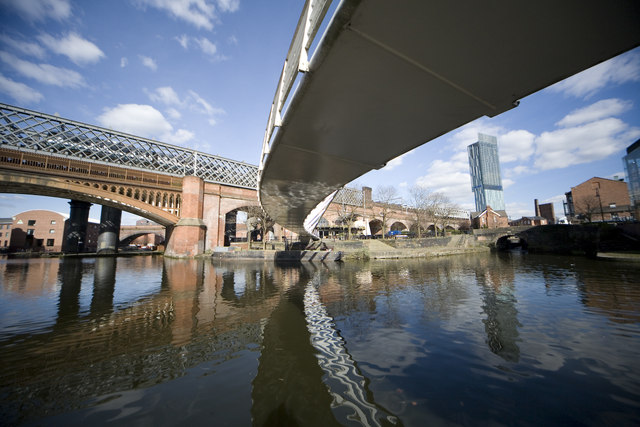
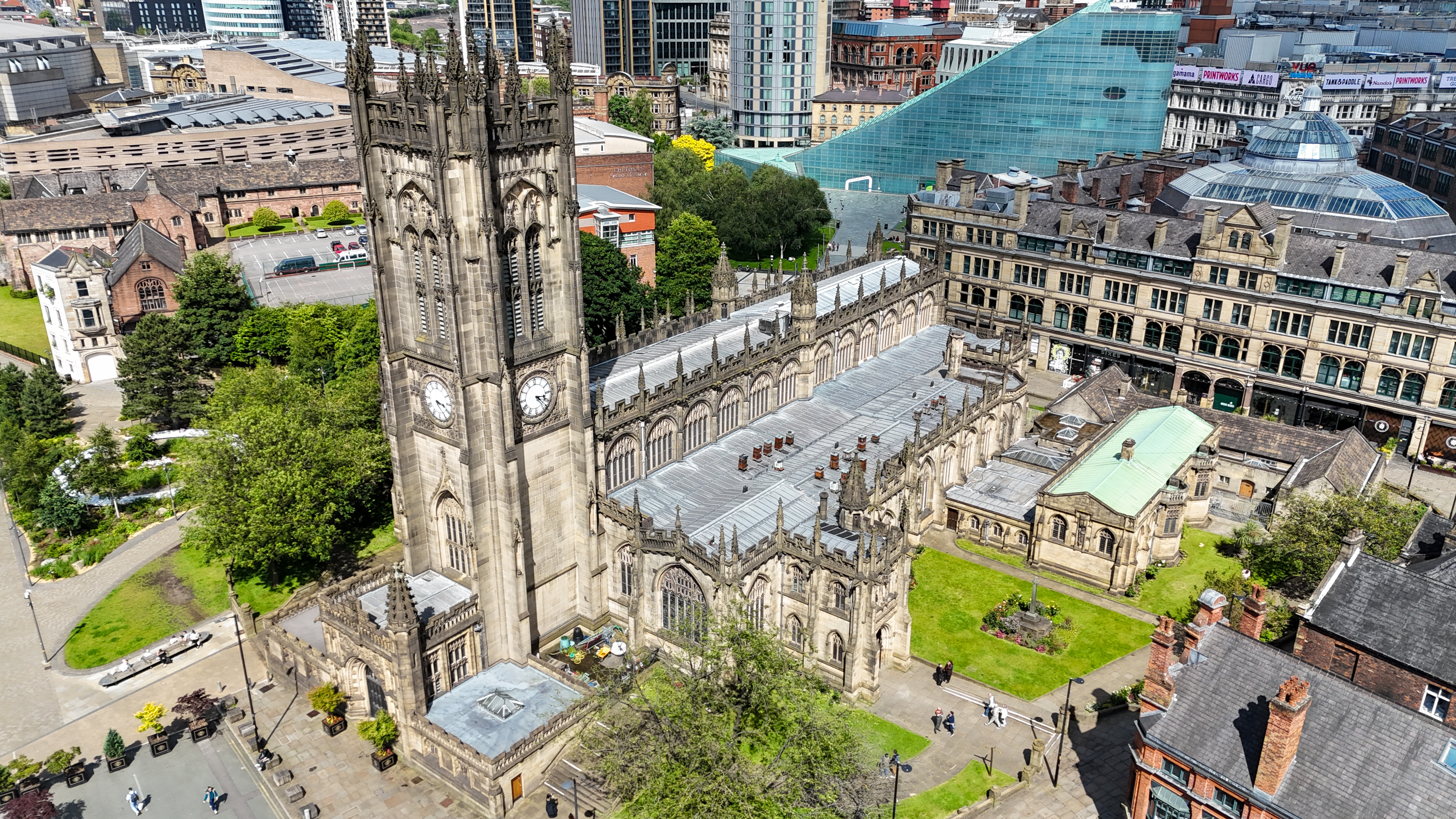
- Deansgate Square Town Hall Midland Hotel Civil Justice Centre John Rylands Library Castlefield Cathedral

- Coat of arms Worker bee
- Nicknames: Mancs; Cottonopolis (historic)
- Motto(s): Latin: Concilio Et Labore, lit. 'By Counsel and Work'
- Manchester shown within Greater Manchester
- Coordinates: 53°28′46″N 2°14′43″W
- Sovereign state: United Kingdom
- Country: England
- Region: North West
- Ceremonial county and city region: Greater Manchester
- Founded: 1st century AD
- Town charter: 1301
- City status: 29 March 1853
- Metropolitan borough: 1 April 1974
- Administrative HQ: Manchester Town Hall

Government
  - Type: Metropolitan borough
  - Body: Manchester City Council
  - Executive: Leader and cabinet
  - Control: Labour
  - Leader: Garry Bridges
  - Lord Mayor: Shaukat Ali
  - MPs: 6 MPs: Hannah Spencer (G); Mike Kane (L); Afzal Khan (L); Lucy Powell (L); Jeff Smith (L); Graham Stringer (L)

Area
  - Total: 45 sq mi (116 km^{2})
  - Rank: 181st

Population (2025)
  - Total: 588,256
  - Rank: 6th
  - Density: 13,170/sq mi (5,086/km^{2})
- Demonyms: Mancunian; Manc (colloq.)

Ethnicity (2021)
  - Ethnic groups: List: 56.8% White; 20.9% Asian; 11.9% Black; 5.3% Mixed; 5.1% other

Religion (2021)
  - Religion: List: 36.2% Christianity; 32.4% no religion; 22.3% Islam; 1.1% Hinduism; 0.6% Buddhism; 0.5% Sikhism; 0.5% Judaism; 0.5% other; 5.9% not stated
- Time zone: UTC+0 (GMT)
  - Summer (DST): UTC+1 (BST)
- Postcode area: M; WA
- Dialling code: 0161
- ISO 3166 code: GB-MAN
- GSS code: E08000003
- Website: manchester.gov.uk

Manchester (Note: Pronounced /ˈmæntʃɪstər, -tʃɛs-/) is a city and metropolitan borough in North West England, at the centre of the eponymous county of Greater Manchester. It had a population of over 589,000 in 2024. It borders the Cheshire Plain to the south, the Pennines to the north and east, and the city of Salford to the west. The two cities and the surrounding towns form one of the United Kingdom's most populous conurbations, the Greater Manchester Built-up Area, which has a population of 2.87 million.

The history of Manchester began with the civilian settlement associated with the Roman fort of Mamucium or Mancunium, established around AD 79 on a sandstone bluff near the confluence of the rivers Medlock and Irwell. Historically part of Lancashire, areas of Cheshire south of the River Mersey were incorporated into Manchester in the 20th century. Throughout the Middle Ages Manchester remained a manorial township, but began to expand significantly with a boom in textile manufacture during the Industrial Revolution, which resulted in it becoming the world's first industrialised city. Manchester attained city status in 1853. The Manchester Ship Canal opened in 1894, creating the Port of Manchester and linking the city to the Irish Sea, 36 miles (58 km) to the west. Its fortune declined after the Second World War, owing to deindustrialisation, and the 1996 Manchester bombing led to extensive investment and regeneration.

Following considerable redevelopment, Manchester was the host city for the 2002 Commonwealth Games. The city is notable for its architecture, musical exports, links to media, links to science and engineering, sports clubs and its transport connections.

== Toponymy ==
The name Manchester originates from Mamucium, the Latin name for the city, or its variant Mancunio; its citizens are still referred to as Mancunians. (Note: Pronounced /mænˈkjuːniən/) These names are generally thought to represent a Latinised version of an older Brittonic name. It is generally accepted that the etymology of the Brittonic name is from *mamm-, which means 'breast', in reference to a breast-shaped hill on which the city was built. More recent research suggests that the name could have instead come from the Brittonic *mamma, which means 'mother', in reference to a local river goddess. (Note: Both possible roots remain extant in Celtic languages today, with mam meaning 'breast' in Irish but the same word meaning 'mother' in Welsh.) The suffix -chester is from Old English ceaster ('Roman fortification', itself a loanword from Latin castrum, 'fort; fortified town'), and was first used after the end of Roman rule in Britain to describe places with former links to the Roman army.

Nicknames for the city that originated from its role in the Industrial Revolution include "warehouse city" and "cottonopolis". The city is widely known as 'the capital of the North' and is part of an ongoing dispute with the larger city of Birmingham to be the unofficial second city of the United Kingdom. The city is also infrequently referred to as 'Manny', especially by non-Mancunians, which is considered offensive by some residents. The phrase was particularly popularised by rapper Bugzy Malone's use of the phrase "putting Manny on the map".

Although the name Manchester only officially applies to the metropolitan borough within the metropolitan county of Greater Manchester, it has been informally applied to various other areas over the years; examples include the "Manchester City Zone", "Manchester post town", and the "Manchester Congestion Charge", none of which simply cover the official confines of the city: the Manchester City zone only includes a handful of stations in the city centre; the Manchester Post town covers Manchester, Sale, and Salford; and the proposed boundary of the Manchester congestion charge was the M60, not the city itself.

== History ==
=== Before 1066: Early history ===
The first major Celtic tribe in what is now Northern England were the Brigantes; they had a stronghold in the locality at a sandstone outcrop on which Manchester Cathedral now stands, opposite the River Irwell. Their territory extended across the fertile lowland of what is now Salford and Stretford. In 79 AD, following their conquest of Britain, the Roman general Agricola ordered the construction of a fort named Mamucium to protect Roman interests in Deva Victrix (now Chester) and Eboracum (now York). Central Manchester has remained a continuously populated settlement since.

Fragments of the Mamucium fort remain visible in Castlefield. The Roman habitation of Manchester probably ended around the 3rd century; its civilian settlement appears to have been abandoned by the mid-3rd century, although the fort may have supported a small garrison until the late 3rd or early 4th century. The fort was first investigated by archaeologists in 1906, and opened to the public in 1984.

=== 1066–1800: Before industrialisation ===
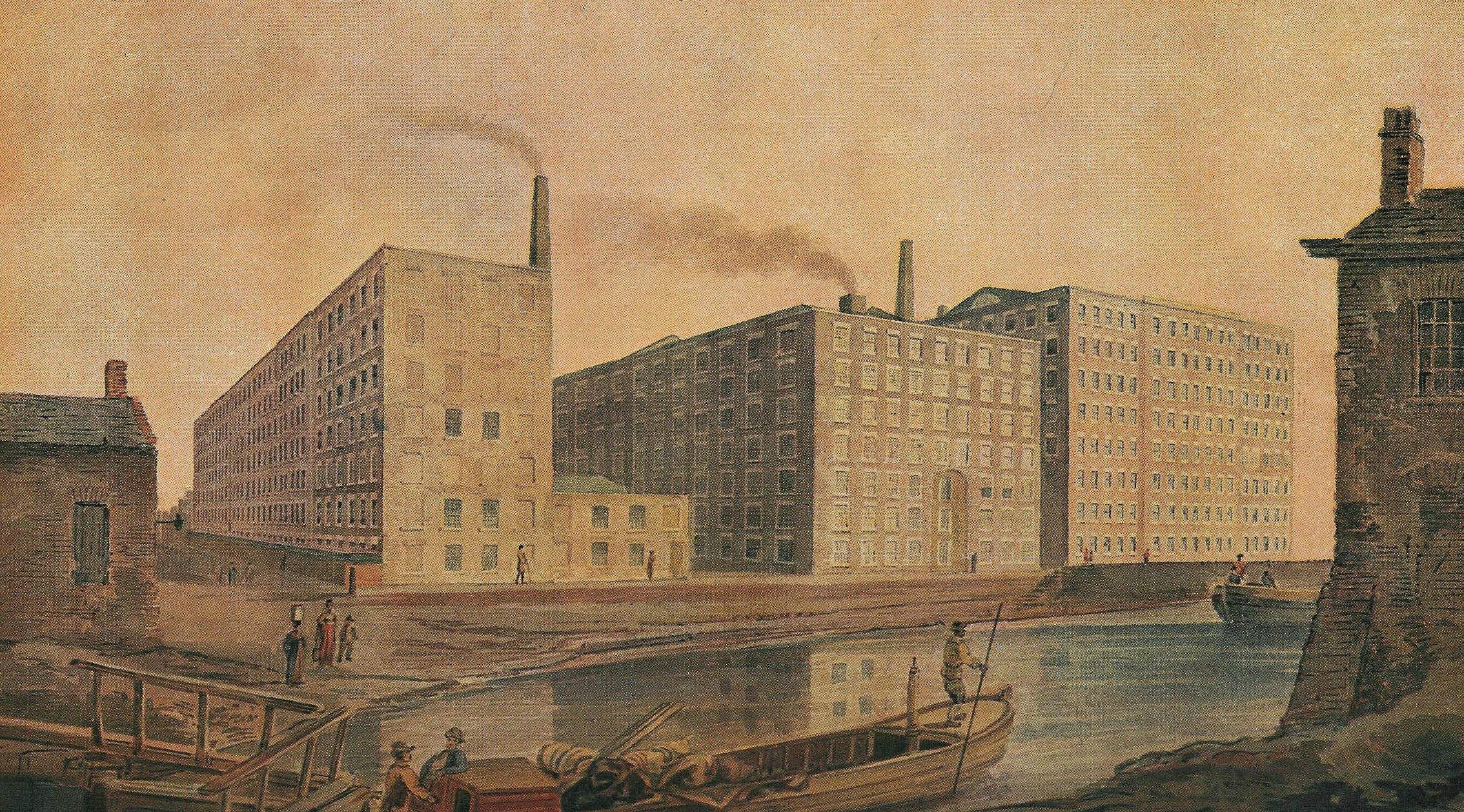
McConnel & Company's cotton mills in Ancoats, c. 1820

After the Roman withdrawal and subsequent Anglo-Saxon settlement, the centre of the town moved to the confluence of the rivers Irwell and Irk. In the Normans' Harrying of the North, much of the area surrounding Manchester was laid waste. The Domesday Book (1086) records Manchester within the hundred of Salford and held as tenant in chief by a Norman named Roger of Poitou. The town was later held by the Grelley family, who were the lords of the manor and residents of Manchester Castle. By 1421, Thomas de la Warre had founded a collegiate church for the parish, which would later become Manchester Cathedral; other church buildings have since become Chetham's School of Music and Chetham's Library. The latter opened in 1653 and remains open to the public, the oldest free public reference library in the UK.

Manchester is recorded as a market in 1282. Around the 14th century, Manchester received an influx of Flemish weavers, which has sometimes been credited as the foundation of the region's textile industry. The town became an important centre for the manufacture and trade of woollens and linen, and by 1540 had expanded to become, in the words of John Leland, "the fairest, best builded, quickest, and most populous town of all Lancashire". The cathedral and Chetham's buildings are the only prominent survivors from that period.

During the English Civil War, Manchester strongly favoured the Parliamentarians who were led by Oliver Cromwell. He gave the town the right to elect its Member of Parliament; Charles Worsley was so elected and appointed as Major-General for Lancashire, Cheshire and Staffordshire during the Rule of the Major-Generals. A diligent puritan, he shut down ale houses in the town and banned the celebration of Christmas.

Large quantities of cotton were used after about 1600, firstly in linen and cotton fustians; by around 1750, pure cotton fabrics were produced and cotton had overtaken wool in importance. The Irwell and Mersey were made navigable by 1736, opening a route from Manchester to the sea docks on the Mersey. The Bridgewater Canal, Britain's first wholly artificial waterway, opened in 1761, bringing coal from mines at Worsley to central Manchester. The canal was extended to the Mersey by 1776. The combination of competition and improved efficiency halved the cost of coal and the transport cost of raw cotton. Manchester became the dominant marketplace for textiles produced in the surrounding towns. A commodities exchange, opened in 1729, and numerous large warehouses aided commerce. In 1780, Richard Arkwright began construction of Manchester's first cotton mill. Manchester exported its cotton goods to Africa as a way of paying for slaves to be purchased for the transatlantic slave trade; this supply line to Africa and its reliance on the British Empire supported Manchester's population and economic growth.

=== 1800–1880: Industrialisation ===
Manchester was one of the centres of textile manufacture during the Industrial Revolution. The majority of cotton spinning took place in the towns of south Lancashire and north Cheshire, and Manchester was for a time the most productive centre of cotton processing. This caused the rapid expansion of the town that would lead to it becoming the world's first industrialised city. Manchester also became known as the world's largest marketplace for cotton goods; it was dubbed "Cottonopolis" and "Warehouse City" during the Victorian era. Brought on by the Industrial Revolution, there was rapid, unplanned urban expansion of Manchester at the turn of the 19th century. Engineering firms made machines for the cotton trade, then diversified into general manufacture. The chemical industry started by producing bleaches and dyes, but expanded into other areas. Commerce was supported by financial service industries such as banking and insurance. In 1803, John Dalton formulated his atomic theory while teaching in the city.

Manchester was the scene of bread and labour riots, as well as calls for greater political recognition by the city's working class. On 16 August 1819, large crowds protested in St Peter's Square, Manchester; estimates of the crowd range between 30,000–150,000 contemporaneously and 50,000–80,000 by modern critics. When ordered to disperse the peaceful crowd, the soldiers charged them on horseback, killing at least 18 and injuring more than 700 in the Peterloo Massacre.

The political landscape of early industrial Manchester contained capitalist and communist schools of thought. The city was the home of Manchester Liberalism, and the centre of the Anti-Corn Law League after 1838. The city is the subject of Friedrich Engels's work The Condition of the Working Class in England in 1844, as Engels spent much of his life in and around Manchester and met with Karl Marx at Chetham's Library. The first Trades Union Congress was held at the Mechanics' Institute, Manchester in 1868 and Manchester was an important centre of the Labour Party, the Suffragette Movement, and the Chartist Movement.

Trade, and feeding the growing population, required a large transport and distribution infrastructure: the canal system was extended, and Manchester became one end of the world's first intercity passenger railway – the Liverpool and Manchester Railway – in 1830. The number of cotton mills in Manchester peaked at 108 in 1853; afterwards, the number declined and Manchester was surpassed as the largest centre of cotton spinning by Bolton by the 1850s and Oldham by the 1860s. This period of decline coincided with the rise of the city as the financial centre of the region. In 1878 the General Post Office (the forerunner of British Telecom) provided its first telephones to a firm in Manchester.

=== 1880–1939: Impacts of industrialisation ===
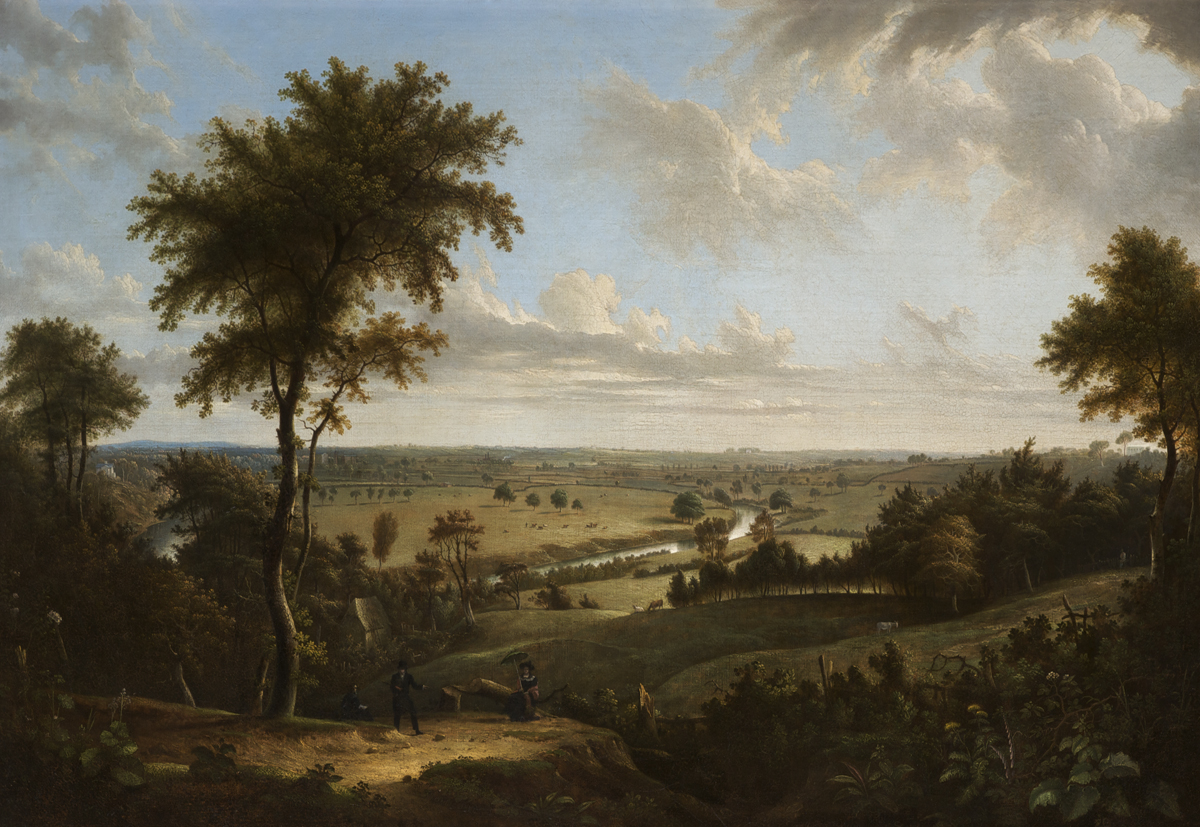
View from Kersal Moor towards Manchester by Sebastian Pether, c. 1820, then still a rural landscape. Note the River Irwell in both paintings.

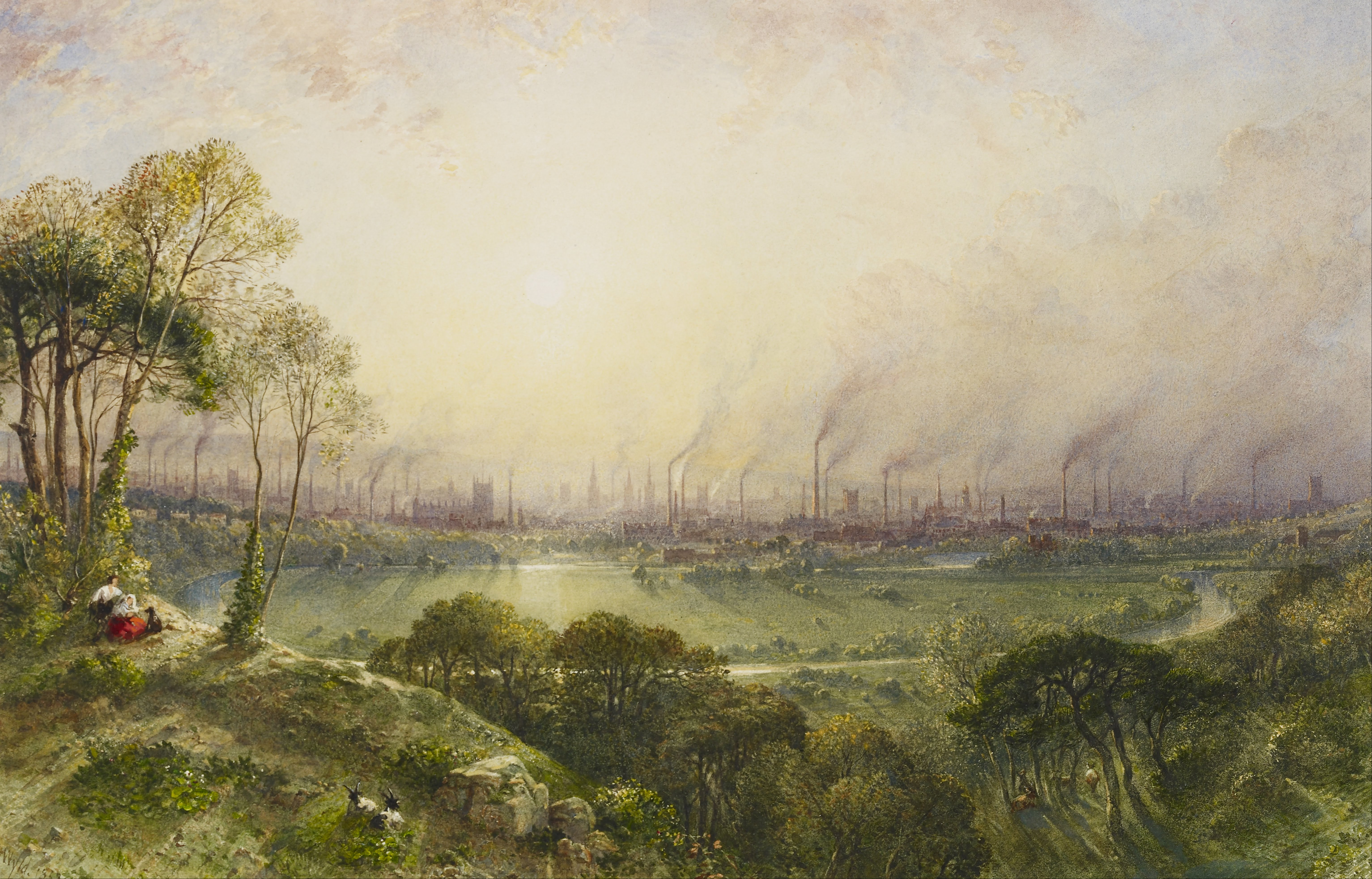
Manchester from Kersal Moor, by William Wyld in 1857, a view now dominated by chimney stacks as a consequence of the Industrial Revolution

New industrial processes were developed in the city, and the city had become known for its experimental ways of thinking: the Manchester School promoted free trade and laissez-faire, there was the advent of new classes or groups in society and new religious sects, and the city was experimenting with new forms of labour organisation. The period saw the construction of some of its finest public buildings, including Manchester Town Hall. It also enjoyed a vibrant culture, which included the Hallé Orchestra. In 1889, when county councils were created in England, the municipal borough became a county borough, giving it greater autonomy. Manchester was also a site of widespread poverty and squalor, with economic extremes on display throughout the city.

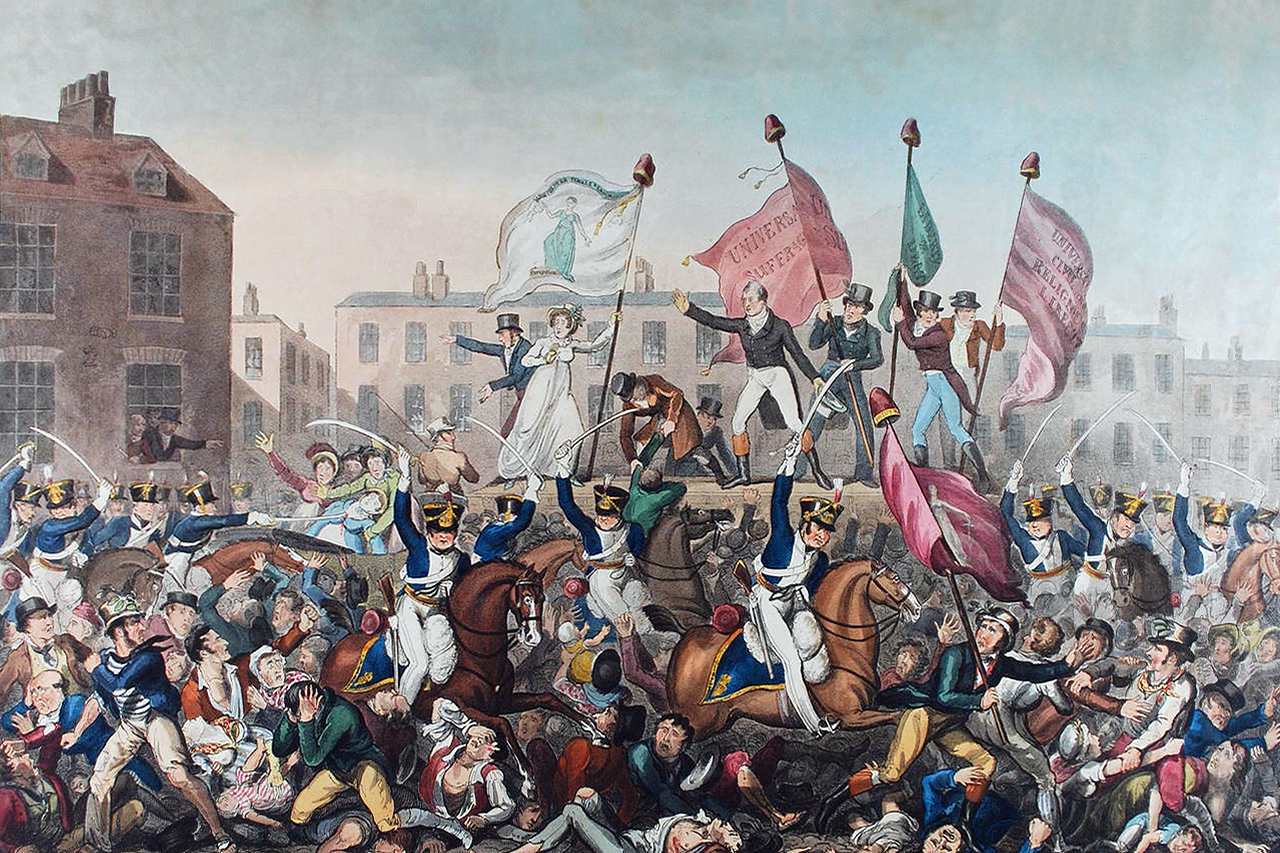
The Peterloo Massacre of 1819 resulted in 18 deaths and several hundred injured.

The Manchester Ship Canal was built between 1888 and 1894, in some sections by canalisation of the Rivers Irwell and Mersey, running 36 miles (58 km) from Salford to Eastham Locks on the tidal Mersey. This enabled oceangoing ships to sail into the Port of Manchester. On the canal's banks, just outside the borough, the world's first industrial estate was created at Trafford Park.

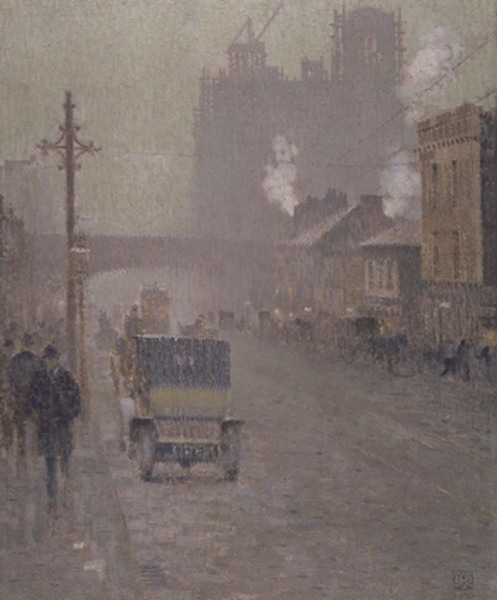
An oil painting of Oxford Road, Manchester, in 1910, by Valette

Manchester continued to process cotton, constituting 65% of the world's production in 1913. The First World War interrupted access to the export markets; combined with increased cotton processing in other parts of the world, this led to the rapid decline of the city's textile industry. Industry and employment suffered during the Great Depression, particularly due to its effect on the value of British exports. Manchester also saw a cultural revolution in the 1930s as locals tried greater creativity and local pride to counteract the effect of the status of the economy; this included the first formation of the British High Street, and embarking on infrastructure projects such as the Manchester Central Library.

=== 1939–1945: Second World War ===
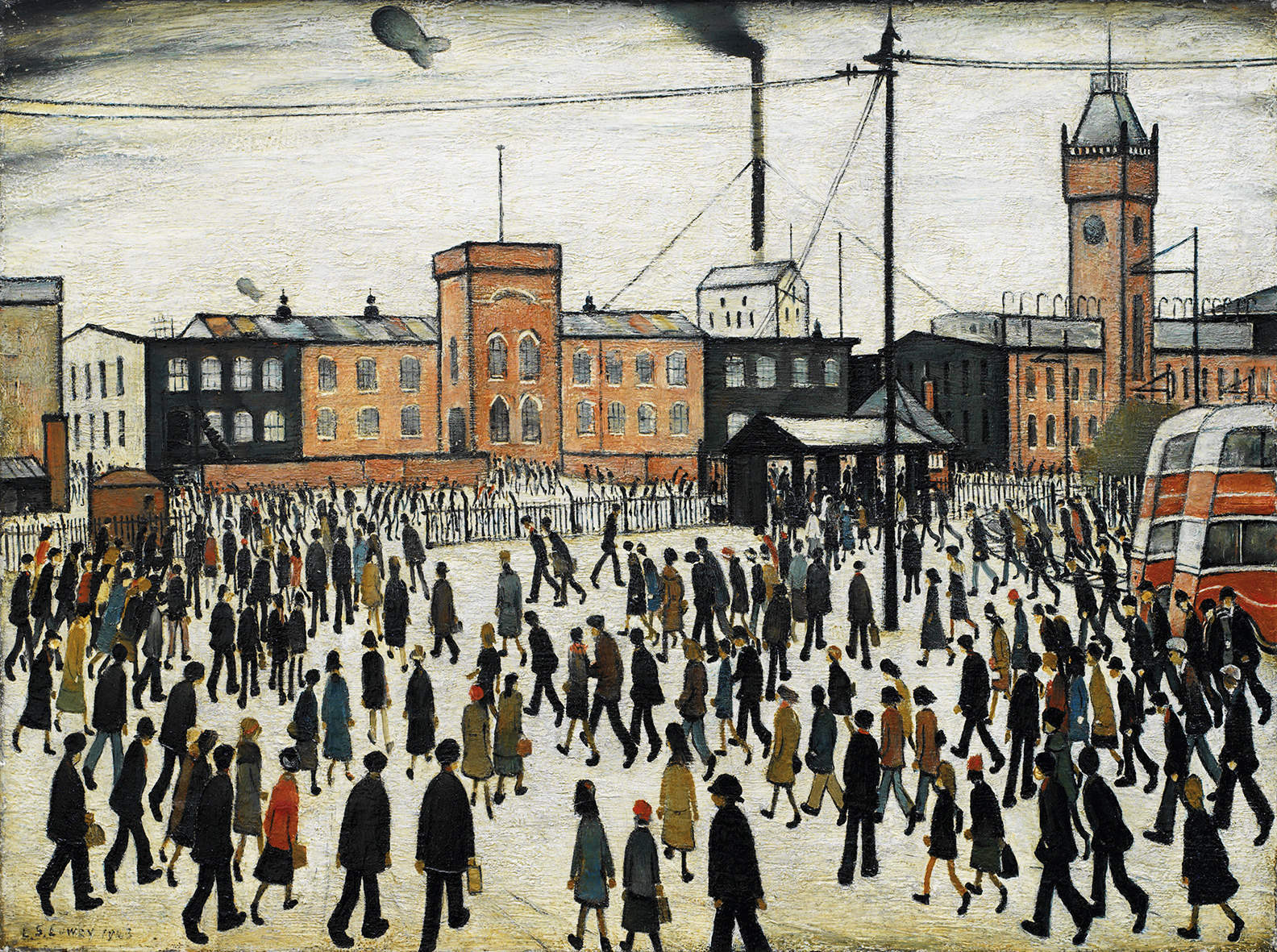
Going to Work by L.S. Lowry, commissioned by the War Artists' Advisory Committee in 1943

Manchester mobilised during the Second World War: casting and machining expertise at Beyer, Peacock & Company's locomotive works in Gorton was switched to bomb making, and Dunlop's rubber works in Chorlton-on-Medlock made barrage balloons. Manchester was the target of bombing by the Luftwaffe, and by late 1940 air raids were taking place against non-military targets.

The biggest air raids on the city during the war took place during the Manchester Blitz on the nights of 22–23 and 24–25 December 1940, when an estimated 474 tonnes (467 long tons) of high explosives and over 37,000 incendiary bombs were dropped. Much of the historic city centre was destroyed, including 165 warehouses, 200 business premises, and 150 offices. 376 were killed and 30,000 houses were damaged. Manchester Cathedral, Royal Exchange and Free Trade Hall were among the buildings seriously damaged, with the restoration of the cathedral taking 20 years. 589 civilians were recorded to have died as a result of enemy action within the Manchester County Borough.

=== 1945–2000: Decline and regeneration ===
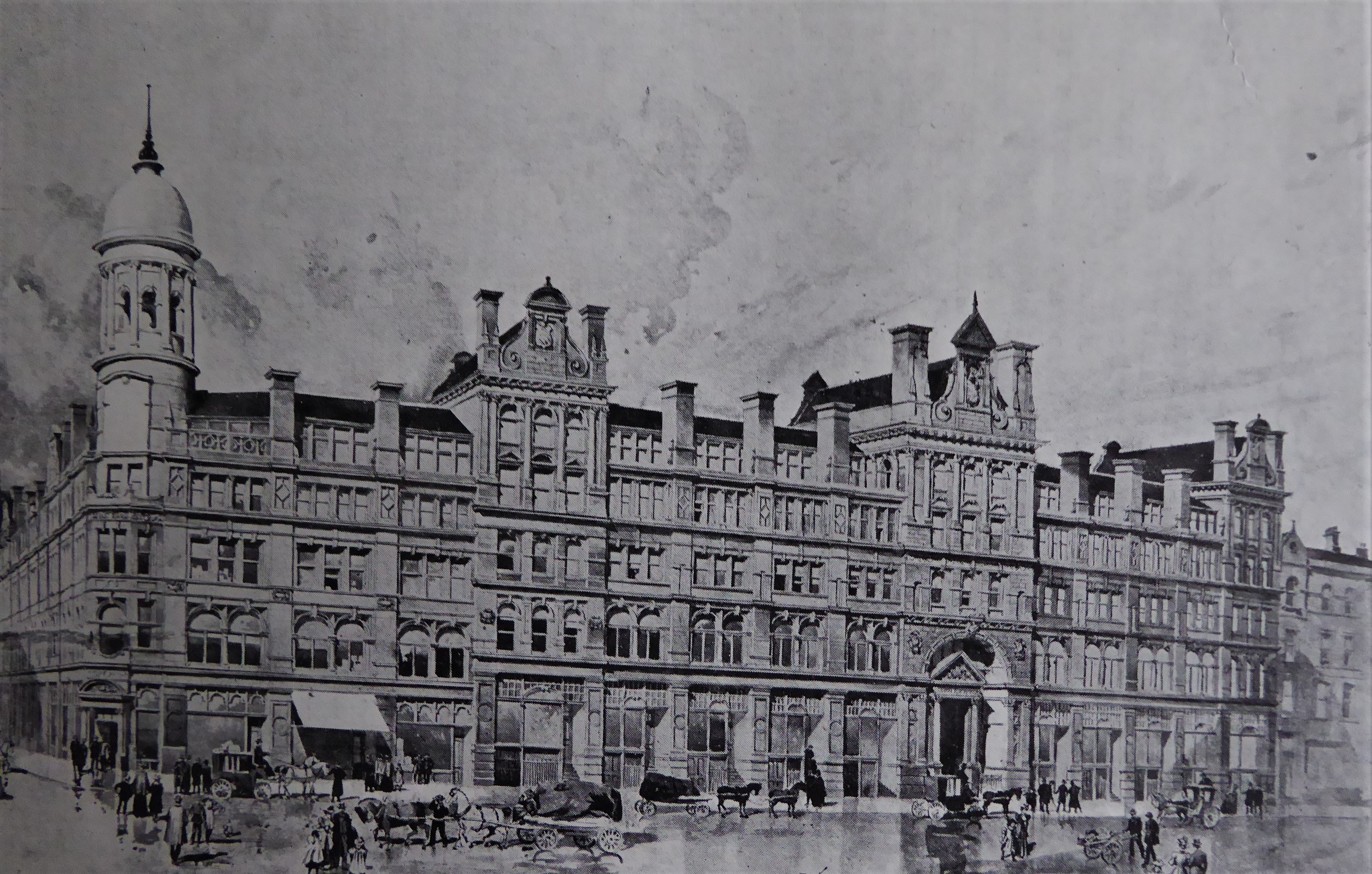
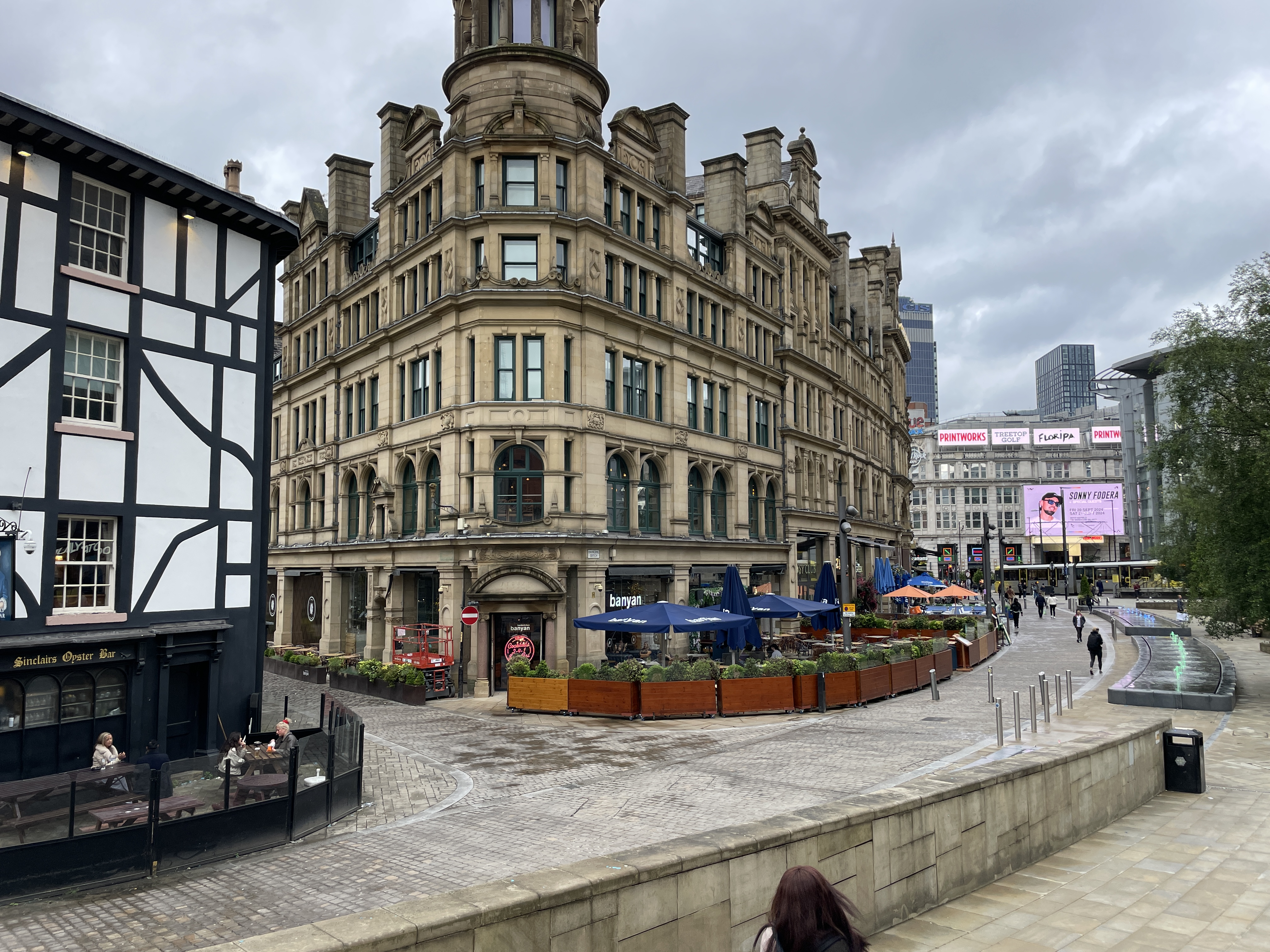
The Corn Exchange in 1902 (top), and in 2024 (bottom)

Cotton processing and trading continued to decline in peacetime, and the exchange closed in 1968. In 1963 the port of Manchester was the UK's third largest, and employed over 3,000 men, but the canal was unable to handle the increasingly large container ships. Traffic declined, and the port closed in 1982. Heavy industry suffered a downturn from the 1960s and was greatly reduced under the economic policies of Margaret Thatcher's government after 1979. Manchester lost 150,000 jobs in manufacturing between 1961 and 1983. Regeneration began in the late 1980s, with initiatives such as the Metrolink, the Bridgewater Concert Hall and the Manchester Arena. Two bids to host the Olympic Games in 1996 and 2000 were part of a process to raise the international profile of the city.

On 15 June 1996, the Provisional Irish Republican Army (IRA) set off a lorry bomb in Corporation Street in the city centre. The largest to be detonated on British soil, the bomb injured over 200 people, heavily damaged buildings, and broke windows 1/2 mile (800 m) away. It was one of the most costly man-made disasters in history: the immediate damage was initially estimated at £50 million (equivalent to £100,000,000 in 2025), but this was quickly revised upwards. The final insurance pay-out was over £400 million (equivalent to £803,000,000 in 2025); many affected businesses never recovered from the loss of trade but it is also credited with helping to drive the regeneration of the city.

=== 2000–present: Modern day ===
Corporation Street after the bombing in 1996

Spurred by the investment after the 1996 bombing and aided by the 2002 Commonwealth Games, the city centre underwent extensive regeneration. The Printworks was redeveloped by architects RTKL Associates and reopened as a leisure centre and cinema. The Corn Exchange reopened as the Triangle Shopping Centre and redeveloped in 2012. Manchester Arndale is the UK's largest city-centre shopping centre.

Large parts of the city have been demolished, re-developed or modernised with the use of glass and steel. Former mills have been converted into apartments. The 47-storey, 554-foot (169 m) Beetham Tower was the tallest UK building outside of London and the highest residential accommodation in Europe when completed in 2006. It was surpassed in 2018 by the 659-foot (201 m) South Tower of the Deansgate Square project, also in Manchester.

On 22 May 2017, an Islamist terrorist carried out a suicide bombing outside the Manchester Arena, shortly after an Ariana Grande concert. The explosion killed 23 people (including the perpetrator) and injured over 800. It was the deadliest terrorist attack and first suicide bombing in Britain since the 7 July 2005 London bombings and changed the UK's threat level to "critical" for the first time since 2007. On 2 October 2025, two Jewish people were killed in an Islamist terror attack outside the Heaton Park Hebrew Congregation synagogue.

== Government ==
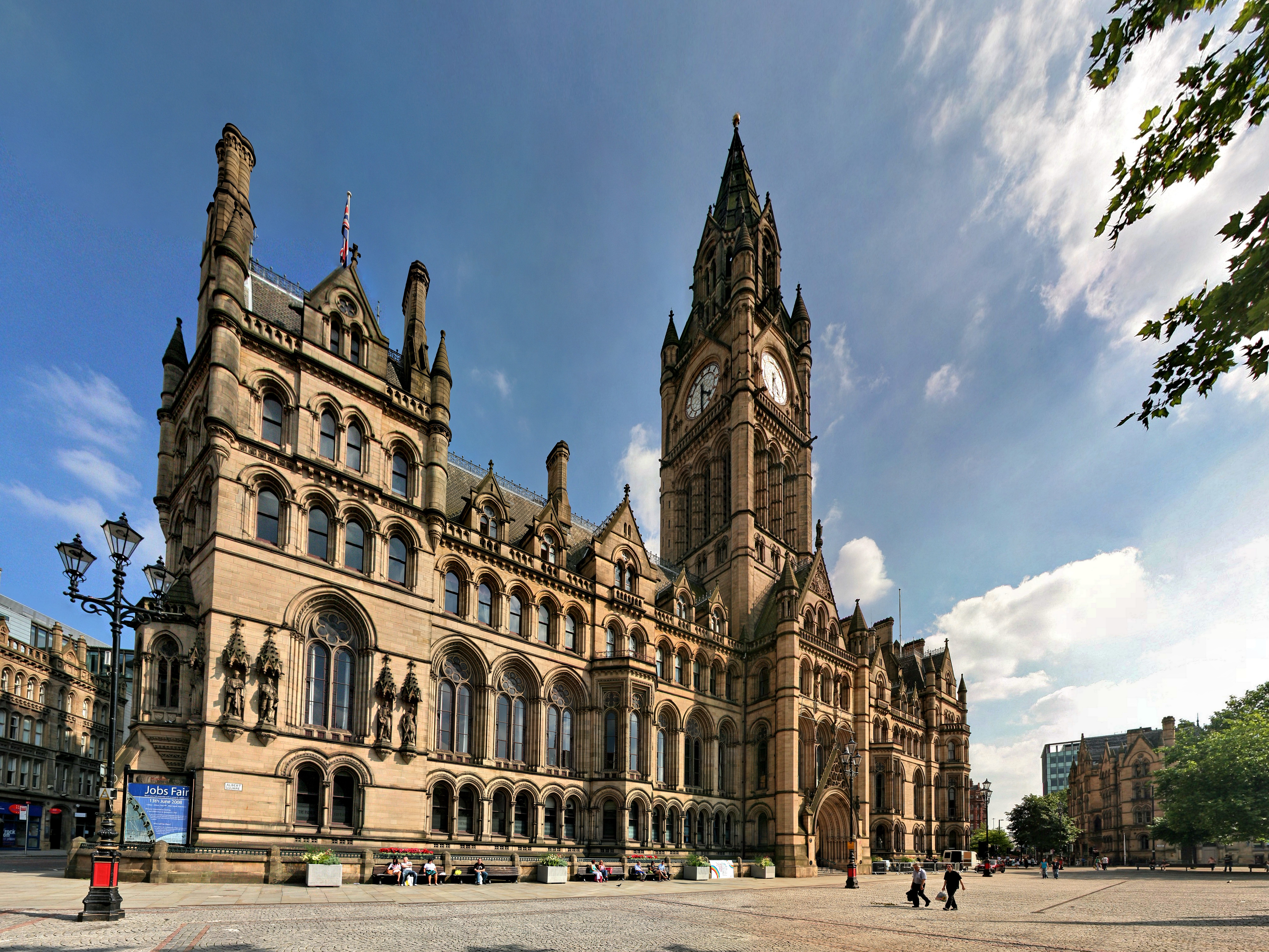
Manchester Town Hall in Albert Square, the seat of local government, is an example of Victorian-era Gothic Revival architecture.

The City of Manchester is governed by Manchester City Council. The Greater Manchester Combined Authority, with a directly elected mayor, has responsibilities for several areas such as economic strategy and transport on a Greater Manchester-wide basis. Manchester has been a member of the English Core Cities Group since its inception in 1995.

The town of Manchester was granted a charter in 1301 but lost its borough status in a court case of 1359. Until the 19th century, local government was largely controlled by manorial courts, the last of which was dissolved in 1846. In 1792, Police Commissioners were established for the social improvement of Manchester. It regained its borough status in 1838 and comprised the townships of Beswick, Cheetham Hill, Chorlton upon Medlock and Hulme. By 1846, with increasing population and greater industrialisation, the Borough Council had assumed the powers of the Police Commissioners. In 1853, Manchester was granted city status. Its boundaries have since been extended subsuming Harpurhey, Rusholme and parts of Moss Side and Withington in 1885; Burnage, Chorlton-cum-Hardy, Didsbury, Fallowfield, Levenshulme, Longsight, Withington, Baguley and Northenden between the 1880s and the 1930s; and Ringway in 1974.

In 2014, it was announced that Greater Manchester would have a directly elected mayor with fiscal control over health, transport, housing and police in ten local authorities which form the Greater Manchester Combined Authority. Andy Burnham, of the Labour and Co-operative Party, was elected as the first Mayor of Greater Manchester in the 2017 election, and was re-elected in 2021 and 2024. He resigned following his election to Parliament in 2026, and the current mayor of Greater Manchester is Bev Craig of the Labour and Co-operative Party, who was elected at the 2026 Greater Manchester mayoral by-election.

The mayor of Greater Manchester oversees a budget of £2.6bn in 2024, including £1.51bn which is spent on policing and transport, making this the most powerful mayoral role in the country. Craig is the police and crime commissioner for Greater Manchester ex officio and is responsible for some housing, education, and welfare policies.

Since May 2026 the Lord Mayor has been Shaukat Ali, replacing the outgoing Lord Mayor councillor Carmine Grimshaw.

== Geography ==
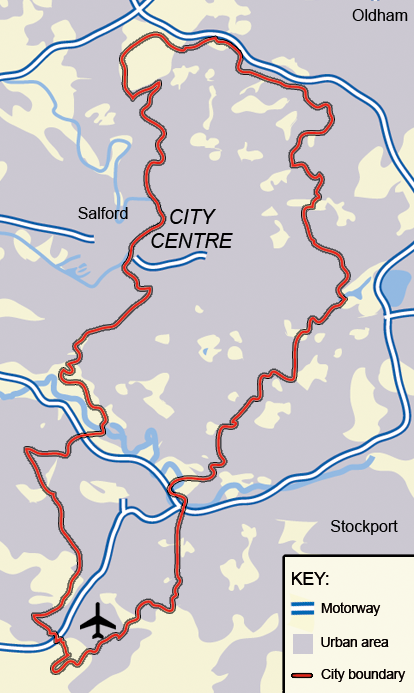
The City of Manchester. The land use is overwhelmingly urban.

At 53°28′0″N 2°14′0″W, 160 miles (260 km) northwest of London, Manchester lies in a bowl-shaped land area bordered to the north and east by the Pennines, an upland chain that runs the length of northern England, and to the south by the Cheshire Plain. Manchester is 35.0 miles (56.3 km) north-east of Liverpool and 35.0 miles (56.3 km) north-west of Sheffield, making the city the halfway point between the two. The city centre is on the east bank of the River Irwell, near its confluences with the Rivers Medlock and Irk, and is relatively low-lying, being between 35 and 42 metres (115 and 138 feet) above sea level.

The River Mersey flows through the south of Manchester. Much of the inner city, especially in the south, is flat, offering views from many highrise buildings in the city of the foothills and moors of the Pennines, which can often be capped with snow in the winter. Manchester's climate, its proximity to a seaport at Liverpool, the availability of waterpower from its rivers, and its nearby coal reserves were highly influential in its early development as an industrial city.

For purposes of the Office for National Statistics, Manchester forms the most populous settlement within the Greater Manchester Urban Area, the United Kingdom's second-largest conurbation. There is a mix of high-density urban and suburban locations. The largest open space in the city, at around 260 hectares (642 acres), is Heaton Park. Manchester is contiguous on all sides with several large settlements, except for a small section along its southern boundary with Cheshire. The M60 and M56 motorways pass through Northenden and Wythenshawe respectively in the south of Manchester. Heavy rail lines enter the city from all directions, the principal destination being Manchester Piccadilly station, the city's largest railway terminus, and the second-busiest in Great Britain outside of London.

Manchester lies at the centre of the North West Green Belt. This reduces urban sprawl, prevents towns in the conurbation from further convergence, protects the identity of outlying communities, and preserves nearby countryside. It is achieved by restricting inappropriate development within the designated areas and imposing stricter conditions on permitted building. Being highly urban, the borough contains limited protected greenfield land with minimal development opportunities.

=== Climate ===
Manchester

Climate chart (precipitation, max. and min. temperature)
J	F	M	A	M	J	J	A	S	O	N	D
67 7 2	61 8 2	51 10 4	61 13 5	59 16 8	63 19 10	60 21 13	73 21 13	71 18 10	95 14 7	86 10 4	84 7 2
- █ Average max. and min. temperatures in °C
- █ Precipitation totals in mm
- Source: Climate-Charts.com
Imperial conversion
J	F	M	A	M	J	J	A	S	O	N	D
2.6 45 35	2.4 47 36	2 51 38	2.4 55 41	2.3 61 46	2.5 65 51	2.4 69 55	2.9 69 55	2.8 64 51	3.7 57 45	3.4 50 40	3.3 45 35
- █ Average max. and min. temperatures in °F
- █ Precipitation totals in inches

Manchester has a temperate oceanic climate (Köppen: Cfb), like much of the British Isles, with warm summers and cold winters compared to other parts of the UK. Summer daytime temperatures regularly top 20 °C (68 °F). In recent years, temperatures have occasionally surpassed 30 °C (86 °F). There is regular but generally light precipitation throughout the year. The city's average annual rainfall is 806.6 mm (31.76 inches) compared to a UK average of 1,125.0 mm (44.29 inches). Its mean rain days are 140.4 per annum, compared to the UK average of 154.4.

Manchester has a relatively high humidity level; this, along with abundant soft water, was one factor that led to the advancement of the textile industry in the area. Snowfalls are not common in the city because of the urban warming effect. The West Pennine Moors to the north-west, South Pennines to the north-east, and Peak District to the east receive more snow, which can close roads leading out of the city. They include the A62 via Oldham and Standedge, the A57, Snake Pass, towards Sheffield, and the Pennine section of the M62. The lowest temperature ever recorded in Manchester was −17.6 °C (0.3 °F) on 7 January 2010. The highest was 38.0 °C (100.4 °F) on 19 July 2022, during the 2022 European Heatwave.

Climate data for Manchester (MAN), 69 m (226 ft) amsl, 1991–2020 normals, extremes 1949–2004, precipitation days 1981–2010
Month	Jan	Feb	Mar	Apr	May	Jun	Jul	Aug	Sep	Oct	Nov	Dec	Year
Record high °C (°F)	14.3 (57.7)	19.0 (66.2)	21.7 (71.1)	25.1 (77.2)	26.7 (80.1)	31.3 (88.3)	32.2 (90.0)	33.7 (92.7)	28.4 (83.1)	27.0 (80.6)	17.7 (63.9)	15.1 (59.2)	33.7 (92.7)
Mean daily maximum °C (°F)	7.3 (45.1)	8.2 (46.8)	10.4 (50.7)	12.7 (54.9)	16.3 (61.3)	18.5 (65.3)	20.6 (69.1)	20.8 (69.4)	17.8 (64.0)	13.7 (56.7)	10.2 (50.4)	7.4 (45.3)	13.7 (56.6)
Daily mean °C (°F)	4.5 (40.1)	5.1 (41.2)	7.0 (44.6)	8.9 (48.0)	12.1 (53.8)	14.5 (58.1)	16.6 (61.9)	16.7 (62.1)	14.1 (57.4)	10.4 (50.7)	7.3 (45.1)	4.6 (40.3)	10.2 (50.3)
Mean daily minimum °C (°F)	1.7 (35.1)	2.0 (35.6)	3.6 (38.5)	5.0 (41.0)	7.8 (46.0)	10.4 (50.7)	12.5 (54.5)	12.6 (54.7)	10.3 (50.5)	7.1 (44.8)	4.4 (39.9)	1.7 (35.1)	6.6 (43.9)
Record low °C (°F)	−17.6 (0.3)	−13.1 (8.4)	−9.7 (14.5)	−4.9 (23.2)	−1.7 (28.9)	0.8 (33.4)	5.4 (41.7)	3.6 (38.5)	0.0 (32.0)	−4.7 (23.5)	−10.0 (14.0)	−14.0 (6.8)	−17.6 (0.3)
Average precipitation mm (inches)	67.3 (2.65)	61.1 (2.41)	51.3 (2.02)	60.6 (2.39)	59.1 (2.33)	62.6 (2.46)	59.8 (2.35)	73.1 (2.88)	71.2 (2.80)	95.1 (3.74)	86.0 (3.39)	84.0 (3.31)	831.2 (32.73)
Average precipitation days (≥ 1.0 mm)	13.1	9.7	12.3	11.2	10.4	11.1	10.9	12.0	11.1	13.6	14.1	13.5	142.9
Average snowy days	6	5	3	2	0	0	0	0	0	0	1	3	20
Average relative humidity (%)	83	81	77	74	72	74	76	77	79	81	83	84	79
Average dew point °C (°F)	2 (36)	2 (36)	3 (37)	4 (39)	7 (45)	9 (48)	11 (52)	12 (54)	10 (50)	8 (46)	5 (41)	3 (37)	6 (43)
Mean monthly sunshine hours	51.4	72.7	100.7	139.7	184.5	173.6	179.0	173.6	131.6	101.9	54.8	47.5	1,411
Mean daily sunshine hours	1.7	2.6	3.2	4.7	6.0	5.8	5.8	5.6	4.4	3.3	1.8	1.5	3.9
Average ultraviolet index	0	1	2	4	5	6	6	5	4	2	1	0	3
Source 1: Starlings Roost Weather NOAA (relative humidity and snow days 1961–1990)
Source 2: Starlings Roost Weather Current Results - Weather and Science Meteo Climat Time and Date: Average dew point (1985–2015) WeatherAtlas

== Demographics ==
City of Manchester population pyramid in 2021

The UK- and foreign-born population pyramid of Manchester in 2021

In the 2021 United Kingdom census, the population of the City of Manchester was 552,000, an increase of 9.7% from the 2011 census. It was slower than the increase between 2001 and 2021 of 20.8%, which was the largest in the UK outside of London. The growth was higher than the forecasted rate of growth of 5.8%. 43.5% of people had never married, 37% were married, 12.24% were separated or divorced, and 7.26% were widowed.

Since 1991, the City of Manchester has grown by 36.3%, faster than other major cities in England. In 2012, 6,547,000 people lived within 30 miles (50 km) of Manchester and 11,694,000 within 50 miles (80 km). In 2011/2012, births exceeded deaths by 4,800. Manchester has a younger population than the average for England: nationally, 82.6% of people are below the age of 65 compared to 91.2% for the City of Manchester. Greater Manchester Combined Authority's analysis of the 2021 census noticed the rising number of 0–15 year olds was a large drive for the increasing population. The Manchester Larger Urban Zone, a Eurostat measure of the functional city-region approximated to local government districts, had a population of 2,539,100 in 2004. (Note: Since Brexit the UK has no longer provided data to Eurostat, and thus it no longer defines Manchester as a Large Urban Zone. In 2024 a partial deal for GDP data was reached between the Office for National Statistics and Eurostat, but the latter's website does not mention any plans for data sharing in regards to urban population.)

=== Religion ===
Religious beliefs, 2021 census.
1. Christian (36.2%)
2. No Religion (32.4%)
3. Muslim (22.3%)
4. Hindu (1.10%)
5. Buddhist (0.60%)
6. Jewish (0.50%)
7. Other (0.50%)
8. Religion Not Stated (5.90%)

The 2021 census identified major movements in the religious affiliations of the city's population. Those identifying as Christian continued to decline; from 62.4% in 2001, 48.7% in 2011, down to 36.2% in 2021. The percentage of the population professing no religion continued to increase; from 16% in 2001, 25.3% in 2011, to 32.4% in 2021, the largest rise of any faith-focused grouping. The second largest rise was seen in the proportion of Muslims; increasing from 9.1% in 2001, to 15.8% in 2011, to 22.38% in 2021. The size of the Jewish population in Greater Manchester is the largest in Britain outside London.

=== Ethnicity ===
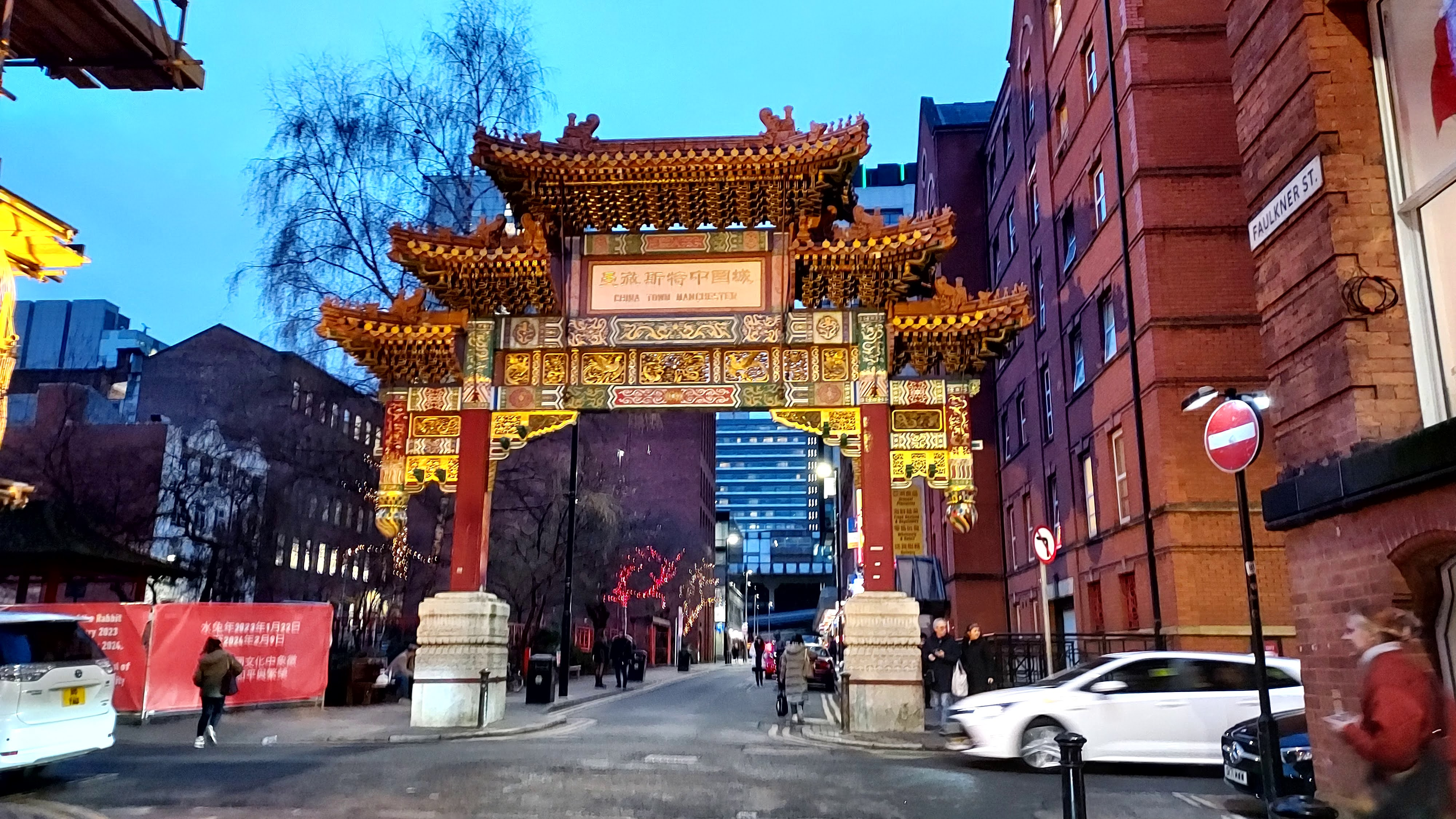
Manchester Chinatown's Paifang arch

The ethnic demography of Manchester from 1971 to 2021

The City of Manchester has the highest non-white proportion of any district in Greater Manchester. The 2021 census showed that 56.8% of the population was White. 48.7% were White British, 1.7% White Irish, 0.1% Gypsy or Irish Traveller, and 6.2% Other White. The size of mixed European and British ethnic groups is unclear. 5.2% were mixed race (1.8% White and Black Caribbean, 1.1% White and Black African, 1.1% White and Asian, 1.2% other mixed), 20.9% Asian (2.7% Indian, 11.9% Pakistani, 1.8% Bangladeshi, 2.3% Chinese, 2.2% other Asian), 12% Black (8.7% African, 1.9% Caribbean, 1.4% other Black), 2.7% Arab and 2.4% of other ethnic heritage.

Moss Side, Longsight, Cheetham Hill, and Rusholme are population centres for ethnic minorities. Manchester's Irish Festival, including a St Patrick's Day parade, is one of Europe's largest. There is a well-established Chinatown in the city, which attracts large numbers of Chinese university students who contribute to Manchester having the third-largest Chinese population in Europe.

Ethnicity of Manchester, from 1971 to 2021:

Ethnic group	Year											
Ethnic group	1971 estimations		1981 estimations		1991		2001		2011		2021	
Ethnic group	Number	%	Number	%	Number	%	Number	%	Number	%	Number	%
White: Total	512,936	95.8%	396,487	92.1%	353,685	87.4%	318,013	81%	335,109	66.6%	313,632	56.8%
White: British	–	–	–	–	–	–	292,498	74.5%	298,237	59.3%	268,572	48.7%
White: Irish	–	–	–	–	–	–	14,826	3.8%	11,843	2.4%	9,442	1.7%
White: Traveller of Irish heritage	–	–	–	–	–	–	–	–	509	0.1%	597	0.1%
White: Gypsy/Roma	–	–	–	–	–	–	–	–	–	–	883	0.2%
White: Other	–	–	–	–	–	–	10,689	2.7%	24,520	4.9%	34,138	6.2%
Asian / Asian British: Total	–	–	–	–	26,766	6.6%	41,003	10.4%	85,986	17.1%	115,109	20.9%
Asian / Asian British: Indian	–	–	–	–	4,404		5,817		11,417	2.3%	14,857	2.7%
Asian / Asian British: Pakistani	–	–	–	–	15,360	3.8%	23,104	5.9%	42,904	8.5%	65,875	11.9%
Asian / Asian British: Bangladeshi	–	–	–	–	2,000		3,654		6,437	1.3%	9,673	1.8%
Asian / Asian British: Chinese	–	–	–	–	3,103		5,126		13,539	2.7%	12,644	2.3%
Asian / Asian British: Other Asians	–	–	–	–	1,899		3,302		11,689	2.3%	12,060	2.2%
Black / Black British: Total	–	–	–	–	18,898	4.7%	17,739	4.5%	43,484	8.6%	65,893	12%
Black: African	–	–	–	–	3,465	0.9%	6,655	1.7%	25,718	5.1%	47,858	8.7%
Black: Caribbean	–	–	–	–	10,390	2.6%	9,044	2.3%	9,642	1.9%	10,472	1.9%
Black: Other Blacks	–	–	–	–	5,043		2,040		8,124	1.6%	7,563	1.4%
Mixed / British Mixed	–	–	–	–	–	–	12,673	3.2%	23,161	4.6%	29,026	5.2%
White and Black Caribbean	–	–	–	–	–	–	5,295		8,877	1.8%	9,987	1.8%
White and Black African	–	–	–	–	–	–	2,412		4,397	0.9%	5,992	1.1%
White and Asian	–	–	–	–	–	–	2,459		4,791	1%	6,149	1.1%
Any other mixed background	–	–	–	–	–	–	2,507		5,096	1%	6,898	1.2%
Other: Total	–	–	–	–	5,517	1.4%	3,391	0.9%	15,387	3.1%	28,278	5.1%
Other: Arab	–	–	–	–	5,517	1.4%	3,391	0.9%	9,503	1.9%	15,028	2.7%
Other: Any other ethnic group	–	–	–	–	–	–	–	–	5,884	1.2%	13,250	2.4%
Ethnic minority	22,484	4.2%	33,944	7.9%	51,181	12.6%	74,806	19%	168,018	33.4%	238,306	43.2%
Total:	535,420	100%	430,431	100%	404,866	100%	392,819	100%	503,127	100%	551,938	100%

Ethnicity of school pupils

Ethnic group	School year			
Ethnic group	2004/2005		2021/2022	
Ethnic group	Number	%	Number	%
White: Total	34,860	64%	34,609	37.6%
White: British	33,698	61.9%	29,591	32.2%
White: Irish	373		320	0.3%
White: Traveller of Irish heritage	106		87	0.1%
White: Gypsy/Roma	23		286	0.3%
White: Other	658		4,325	4.7%
Asian / Asian British: Total	8,893	16.3%	23,594	25.9%
Asian / Asian British: Indian	770		2,163	2.4%
Asian / Asian British: Pakistani	6,204		15,838	17.3%
Asian / Asian British: Bangladeshi	971		2,157	2.4%
Asian / Asian British: Chinese	390		1,073	1.2%
Asian / Asian British: Other Asians	558		2,363	2.6%
Black / Black British: Total	4,700	8.6%	15,699	17.1%
Black: Caribbean	1,517		1,324	1.4%
Black: African	2,618		11,014	12.0%
Black: Other Blacks	564		3,361	3.7%
Mixed / British Mixed	3,530	6.5%	8,808	9.5%
Other: Total	1,690	3.1%	7,448	8.1%
Unclassified	793	1.5%	1,628	1.8%
Total:	54,470	100%	91,786	100%

== Economy ==
=== Macroeconomic wealth ===
City of Manchester GVA (balanced) 2013–2023
Year	Manchester GVA per head (£ mn)	Manchester GVA growth	UK GVA per head (£ mn)	UK GVA growth
2013	£34,915	▲2.6%	£24,783	▲3.8%
2014	£35,718	▲3.2%	£25,694	▲4.5%
2015	£36,983	▲5.1%	£26,249	▲2.9%
2016	£38,612	▲6.4%	£27,037	▲3.8%
2017	£42,228	▲10.1%	£28,132	▲4.6%
2018	£43,423	▲3.5%	£28,949	▲3.4%
2019	£46,308	▲7.7%	£29,930	▲3.9%
2020	£45,482	▼ -1.5%	£28.402	▼ -4.9%
2021	£49,639	▲9.8%	£30,546	▲7.9%
2022	£56,943	▲18.1%	£33,521	▲10.7%
2023	£61,859	▲11.2%	£36,103	▲8.8%

The Office for National Statistics does not produce economic data for the City of Manchester alone; instead it groups the city with Salford, Stockport, Tameside, and Trafford in an area named Greater Manchester South. In 2023, the area had a Gross Value Added (GVA) of £34.8 billion. The economy grew relatively strongly between 2002 and 2012, when growth was 2.3% above the national average. The subsequent decade saw a further increase to 3.1% annual growth between 2015 and 2025, a rate double the UK national average.

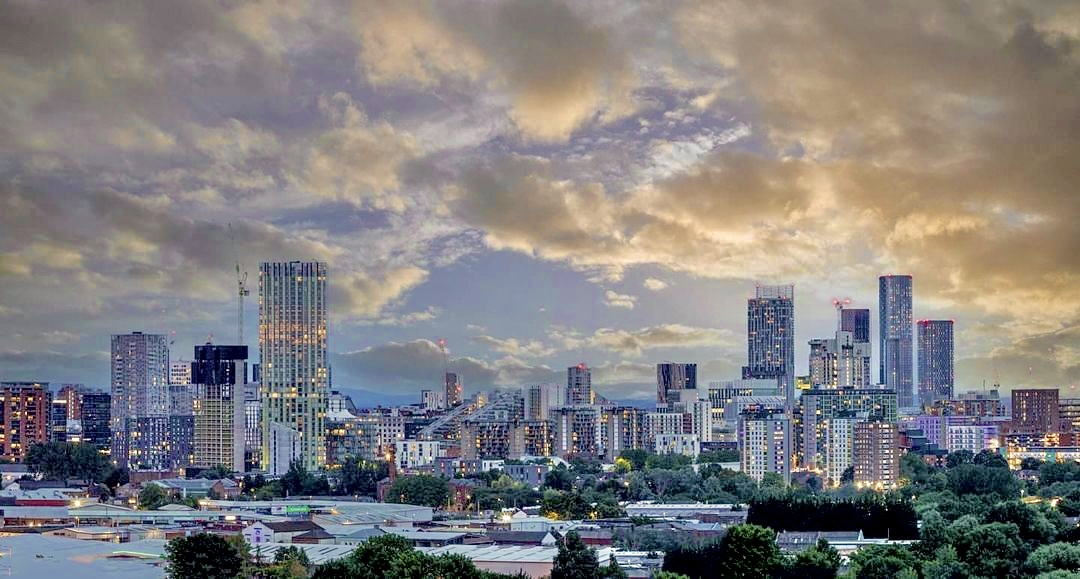
Manchester with Salford skyline

It is ranked as a Beta– (beta minus) city by the Globalization and World Cities Research Network in their 2024 rankings, placing it second for UK cities behind London, which is A++ (the highest ranking). As the UK economy continued to recover from its 2008–2010 downturn, Manchester compared favourably: in 2012 it showed the strongest annual growth in business stock (5%) of all core cities; while its GVA per head, recorded at £61,589 in 2023, had tripled since the start of the 21st century.

The decade between 2015 and 2025 saw the economy affected by the country's withdrawal from the European Union (Brexit) and by the COVID-19 pandemic. Estimates showed a decline in economic output from COVID in the region of 9–10%, and with only 1% of firms in the city reporting a positive impact from Brexit, with 60% reporting a neutral or negative impact. The years since 2021 have seen some recovery, with forecasts for 2025–28 suggesting that growth in the region will reach 2.4% annually, exceeding the expected national growth rate of 1.6%.

=== Individual wealth ===
Some of the country's most deprived and most affluent neighbourhoods are found in Manchester, making it the most unequal local authority in Britain. As of the 2019 Indices of Multiple Deprivation, Manchester is the second most deprived local authority by rank, the sixth by score, and fifth by the proportion of Lower Layer Super Output Areas (LLSOAs) that are deprived, with 43% of its LLOAs falling among the top 10% of areas nationally by the extent of deprivation. By final ranking it is only beaten by Blackpool. As of the 2021 census, 53.5% of the over-16 population is employed, 5.7% are unemployed while actively seeking work, and 40.8% are economically inactive.

Greater Manchester is home to more multi-millionaires than anywhere outside London, with the majority resident in the city. A Henley & Partners survey undertaken in 2024 ranked the city as the second wealthiest in the UK, after London, and the fiftieth richest in the world (London ranked fifth). Women fare better in Manchester than the rest of the country in comparative pay with men. The per hours-worked gender pay gap is 3.3% compared with 11.1% for Britain. 37% of the working-age population in Manchester have degree-level qualifications, as opposed to an average of 33% across other core cities, although its schools under-perform slightly compared with the national average.

In 2013 Manchester was ranked 6th in the UK for quality of life, according to a rating of the UK's 12 largest cities. In 2025, the city overlook London in the Global Liveability Index compiled by the Economist Intelligence Unit, receiving a score of 89.3, against London's 89.2, making it "the UK's most Liveable city".

=== Business wealth ===
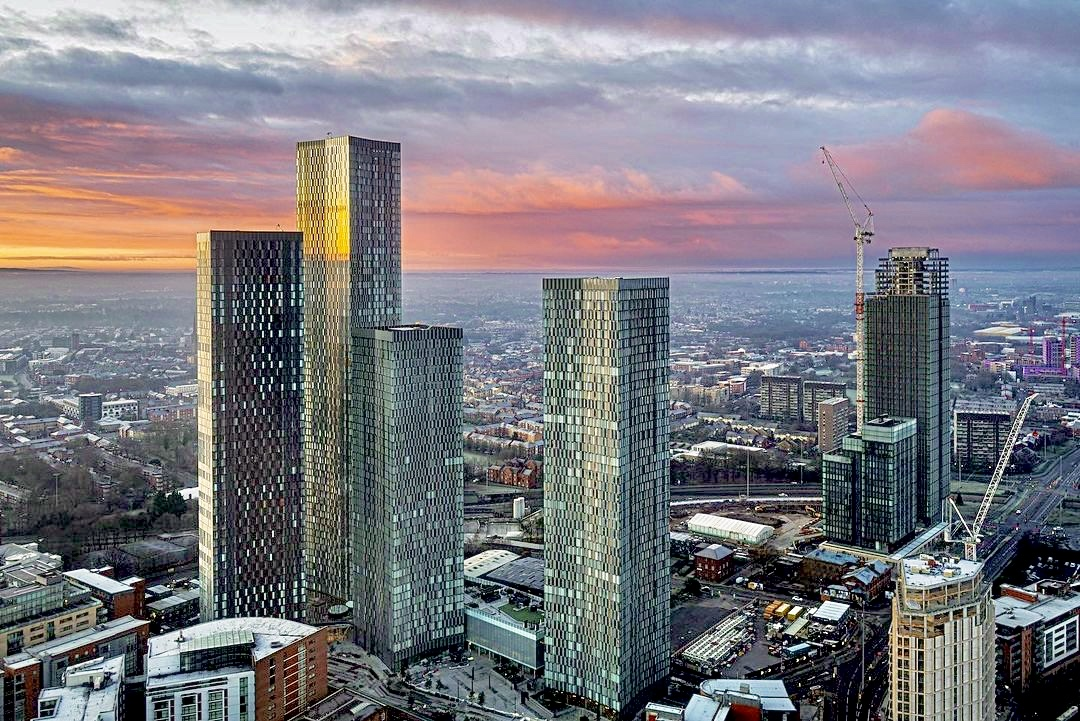
Deansgate Square and Elizabeth's Tower

Manchester's economy is primarily focussed on business, financial and professional services, cultural, creative and digital endeavours, advanced manufacturing and wholesale and retail. 80 of the listed companies on the FTSE 100 Index have representation in the city, and it receives a level of foreign direct investment second only to that of London. The Manchester Inward Investment Agency (MIDAS) suggests that collaboration between business, the public sector and the council, and academia (the city has the largest student population in Europe) has been central to the city's economic development. The city council's part-ownership of two of the UK's four busiest airports generates significant revenues which it deploys to fund local projects. An example is the development of the city's office accommodation market, now the UK's second largest outside London, with a quarterly office uptake (averaged over 2010–2014) of some 250,000 square feet (23,000 m^{2}) – 90,000 square feet (8,400 m^{2}) more than the nearest rival, Birmingham. By 2025 uptake had doubled to over 580,000 square feet (54,000 m^{2}). Other influencing factors include "northshoring" (from offshoring), which entails the relocation or alternative creation of jobs away from the South to areas where office space is possibly cheaper and the workforce market less saturated, and fiscal devolution, which came earlier to Manchester than to any other British city, enabling it to retain half the extra taxes it gains from transport investment.

== Architecture ==
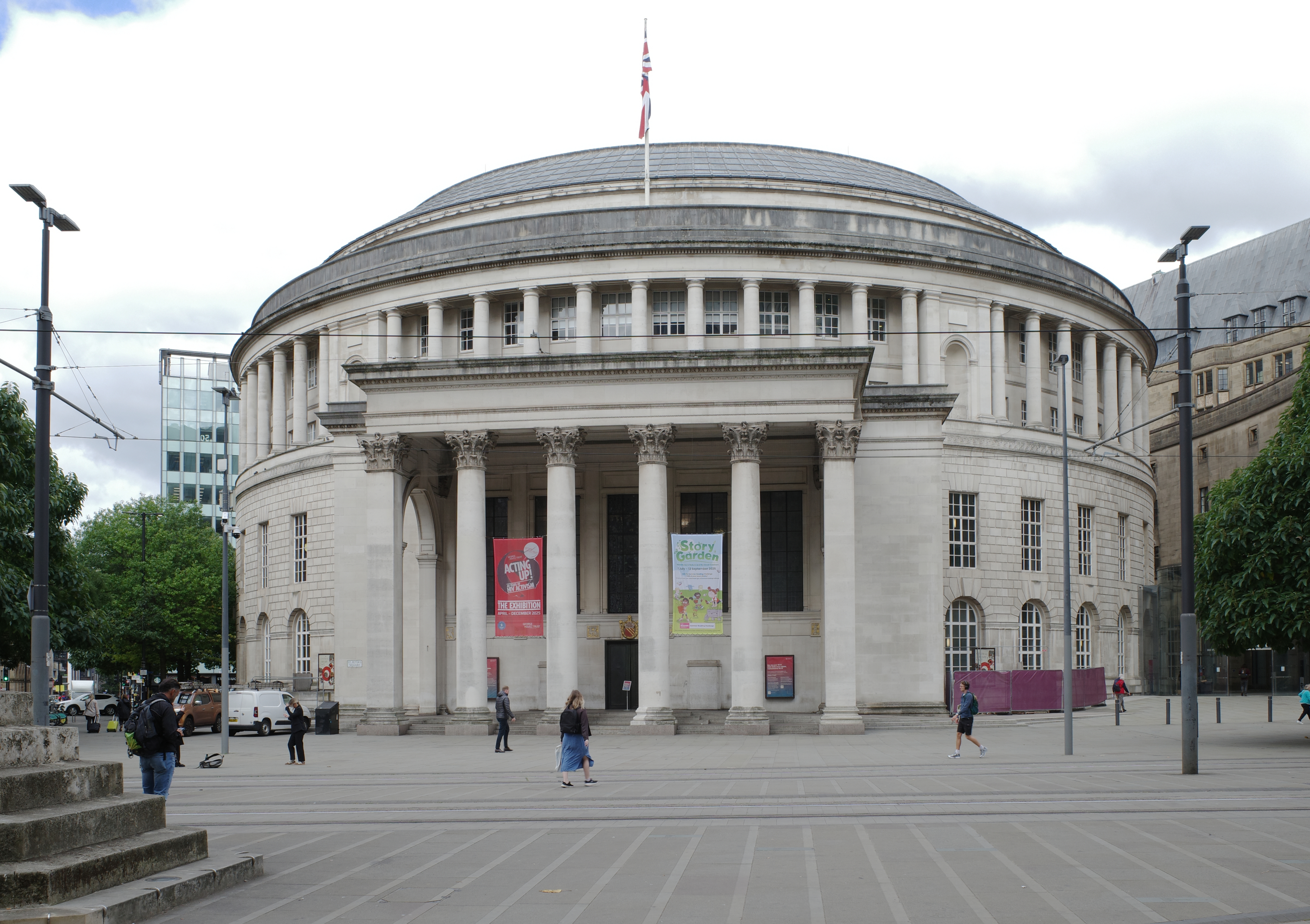
Central Library

Manchester's buildings display a variety of architectural styles, ranging from Victorian to contemporary architecture. The widespread use of red brick characterises the city, much of the architecture of which harks back to its days as a global centre for the cotton trade. Just outside the immediate city centre are a large number of former cotton mills, some of which have been left virtually untouched since their closure, while many have been redeveloped as apartment buildings and office space. Manchester Town Hall, in Albert Square, was built in the Gothic Revival style.

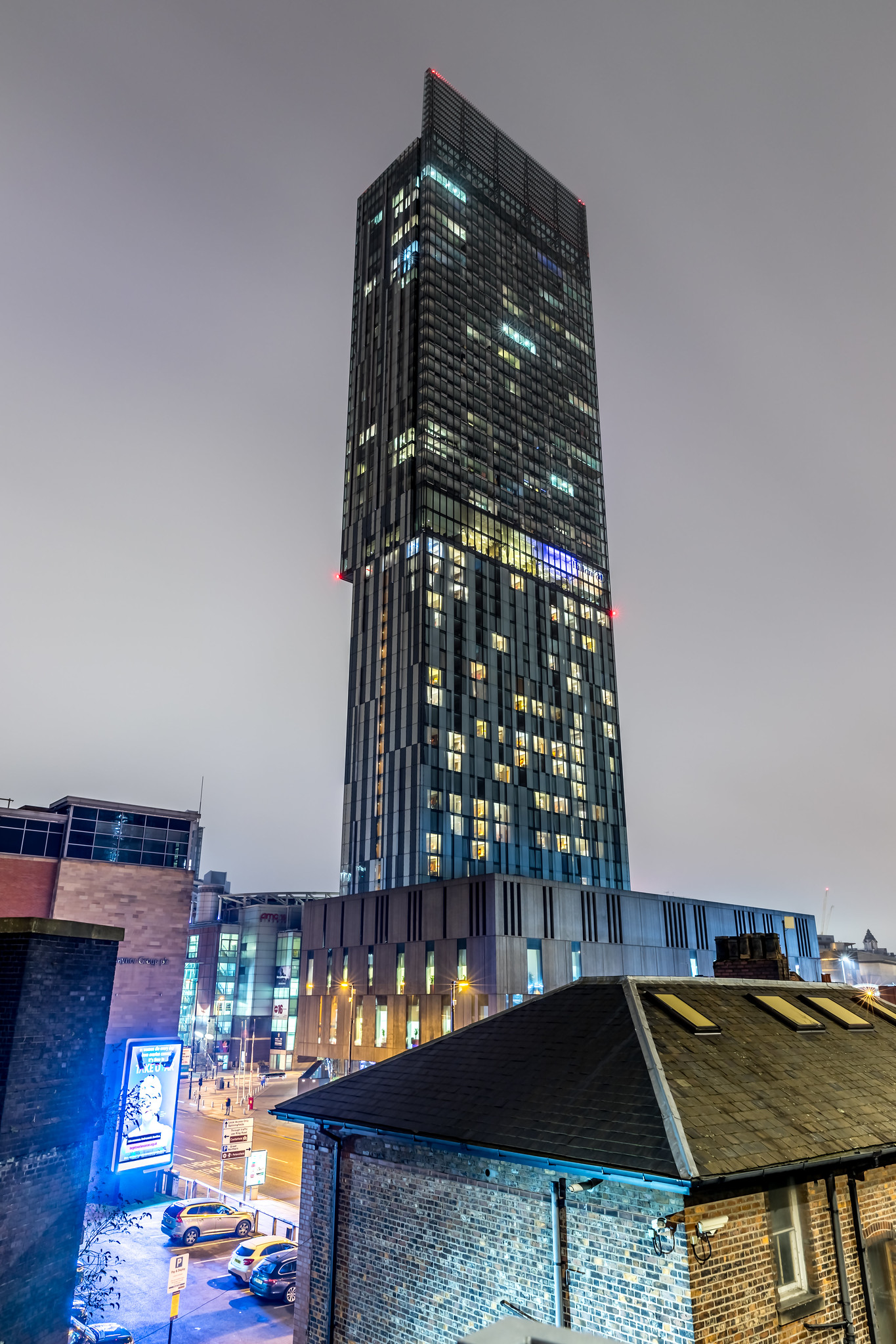
Beetham Tower

Manchester has several skyscrapers built in the 1960s and 1970s; the CIS Tower near Manchester Victoria station was the tallest until the Beetham Tower was completed in 2006. The latter exemplifies a new surge in high-rise building. It includes a Hilton hotel, a restaurant and apartments. The largest skyscraper is now Deansgate Square South Tower, at 201 m (659 ft). The Green Building, opposite Oxford Road station, is an eco-friendly housing project, while the recently completed One Angel Square is one of the most sustainable large buildings in the world.

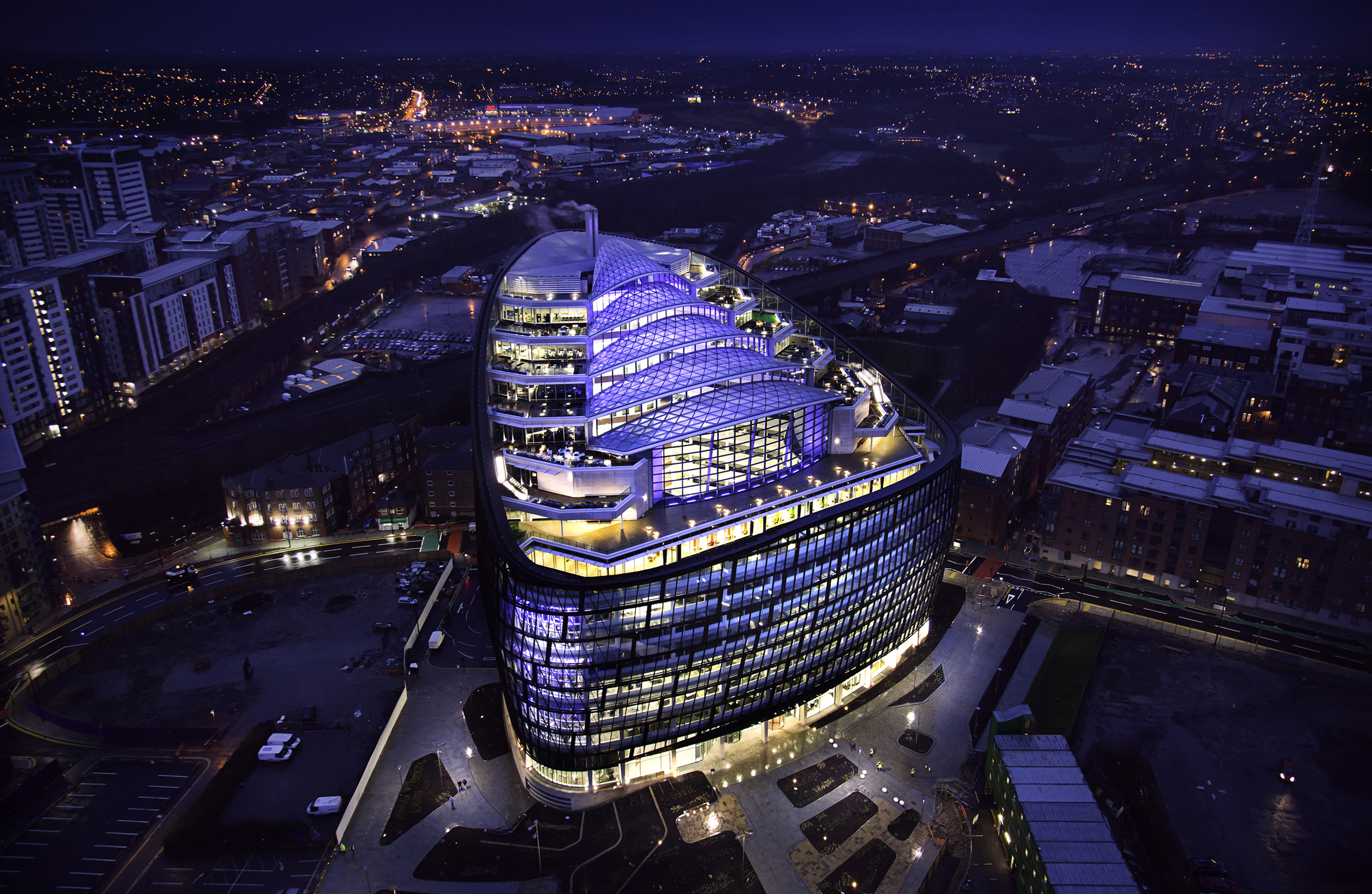
One Angel Square

=== Landmarks ===
Albert Square and St Peter's Square hold many of Manchester's public monuments. Albert Square has monuments to Prince Albert, Bishop James Fraser, Oliver Heywood, William Gladstone and John Bright. Piccadilly Gardens has monuments dedicated to Queen Victoria, Robert Peel, James Watt and the Duke of Wellington. The cenotaph in St Peter's Square is Manchester's main memorial to its war dead. Designed by Edwin Lutyens, it echoes the original on Whitehall in London. The Alan Turing Memorial in Sackville Park commemorates his role as the father of modern computing. A larger-than-life statue of Abraham Lincoln by George Gray Barnard in the eponymous Lincoln Square (having stood for many years in Platt Fields) was presented to the city by Charles Phelps Taft and Anna Sinton to mark the part Lancashire played in the cotton famine and American Civil War of 1861–1865.

Adjacent to Manchester Airport is the Runway Visitor Park, an aviation centre which is the site of G-BOAC, one of the twenty Concorde aircraft built. The aircraft was the flagship of British Airways's fleet because BOAC was the initials of the British Overseas Airways Corporation. Other aircraft on display at the park are a BAE Systems Nimrod MRA4, a Hawker Siddeley Trident, a McDonnell Douglas DC-10, and a British Aerospace 146.

Heaton Park in the north of the city borough is one of the largest municipal parks in Europe, covering 610 acres (250 ha) of parkland. The city has 135 parks, gardens, and open spaces. Manchester has six designated local nature reserves: Chorlton Water Park, Blackley Forest, Clayton Vale and Chorlton Ees, Ivy Green, Boggart Hole Clough and Highfield Country Park.

== Transport ==
=== Rail ===
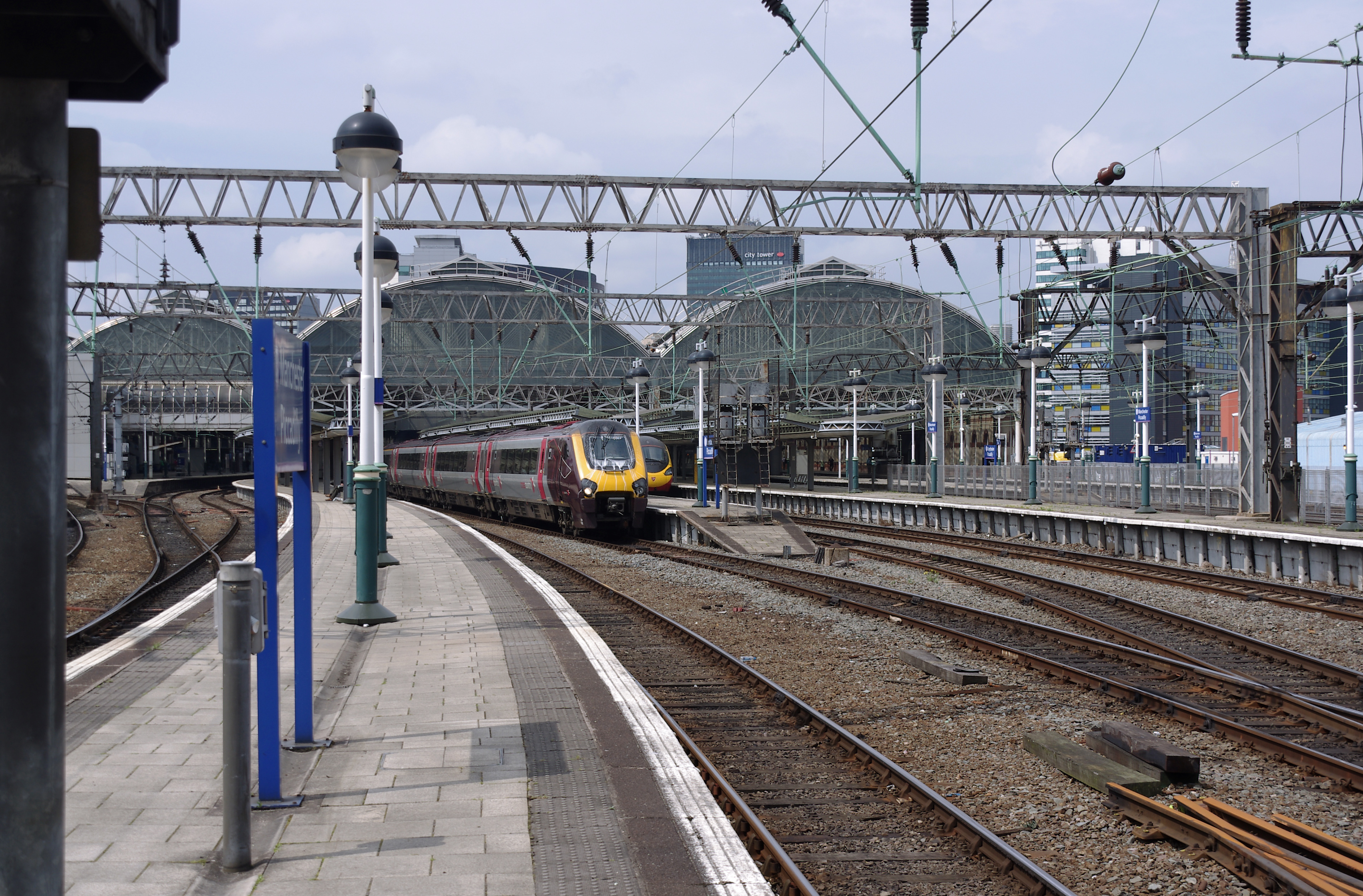
Manchester Piccadilly railway station, the busiest of the four major railway stations in the Manchester station group, with over 32 million passengers using the station in 2019/20

Manchester Liverpool Road was the world's first purpose-built passenger and goods railway station and served as the Manchester terminus on the Liverpool and Manchester Railway, the first inter-city passenger railway in the world. The station opened with the railway in 1830 and closed in 1975. Since 1983 they have been part of the site of the Science and Industry Museum.

Two of the city's four main line terminus stations, Manchester Central and Manchester Exchange, closed to passengers in 1969. Manchester Mayfield station closed to passenger services in 1960 and to freight in 1986. In 2025 Manchester City Council approved the redevelopment of the Mayfield site into a housing estate.

The Northern Hub improvement programme in the 2010s built electrification schemes into and through Manchester, organised redevelopment of Victoria station and led construction of the Ordsall Chord directly linking Victoria and Piccadilly. The city is served by its local rail network that is now working to capacity. It is also the centre of a county-wide railway network, including the West Coast Main Line, with two mainline stations: Manchester Piccadilly and Manchester Victoria. The Manchester station group – comprising Manchester Piccadilly, Manchester Victoria, Manchester Oxford Road and Deansgate – is the third busiest in the UK, with 25.8 million passengers recorded in 2023/2024. The city centre, specifically the Castlefield Corridor, suffers from constrained rail capacity causing delays and cancellations – a 2024 report on reliability and punctuality at the UK's 100 busiest stations placed Manchester Oxford Road as the fifth worst-performing station, with Manchester Piccadilly in twentieth place.

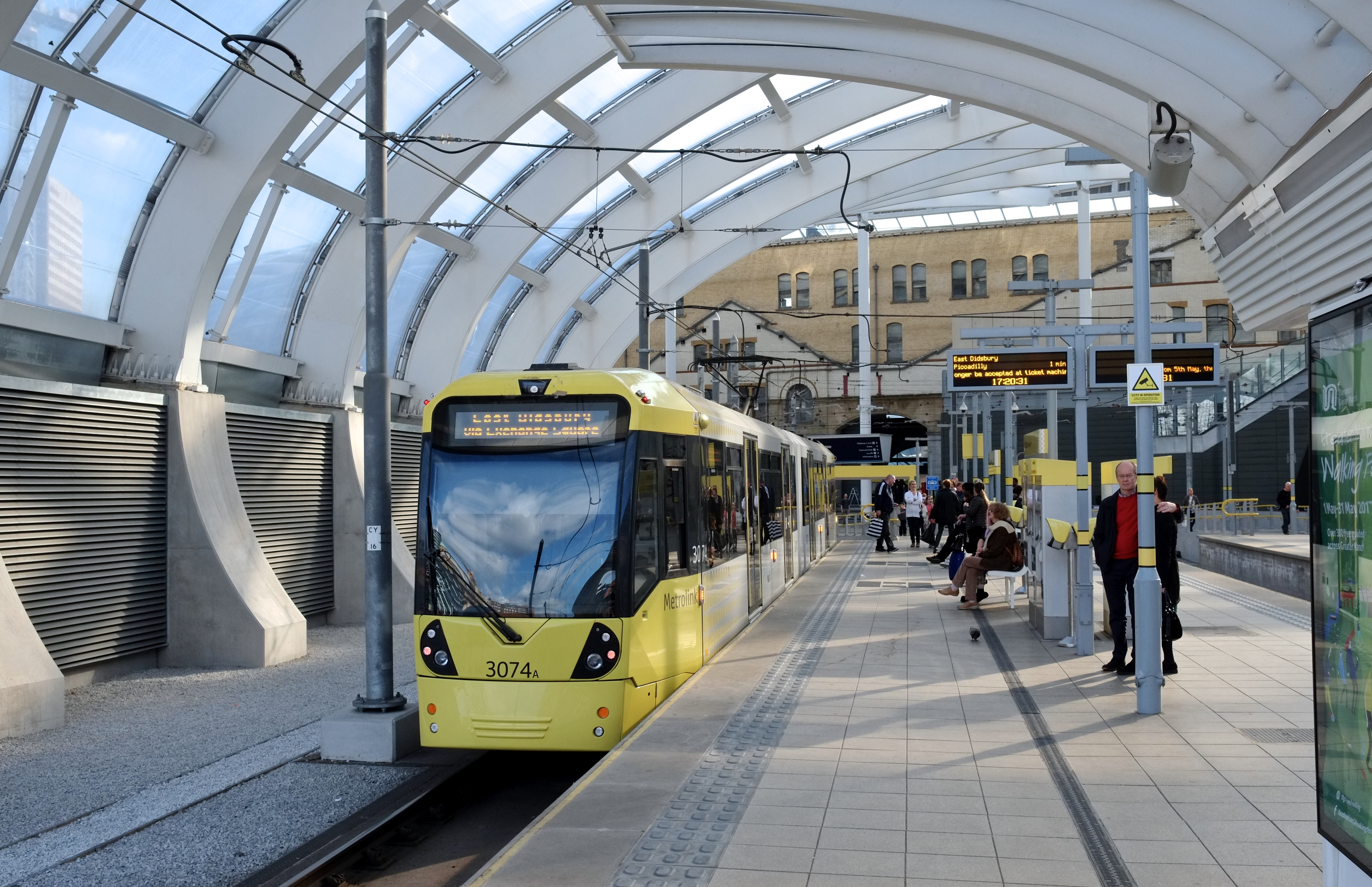
Manchester Metrolink is the largest tram system in the UK, with a total route length of 64 miles (103 km).

Manchester became the first city in the UK to acquire a modern light rail tram system when the Manchester Metrolink opened in 1992. In 2023–2024, 42 million passenger journeys were made on the system. The system mostly runs on former commuter rail lines converted for light rail use, and crosses the city centre via on-street tram lines. The network consists of eight lines with 99 stops. Manchester city centre is also serviced by over a dozen heavy and light rail-based park and ride sites.

=== Bus ===
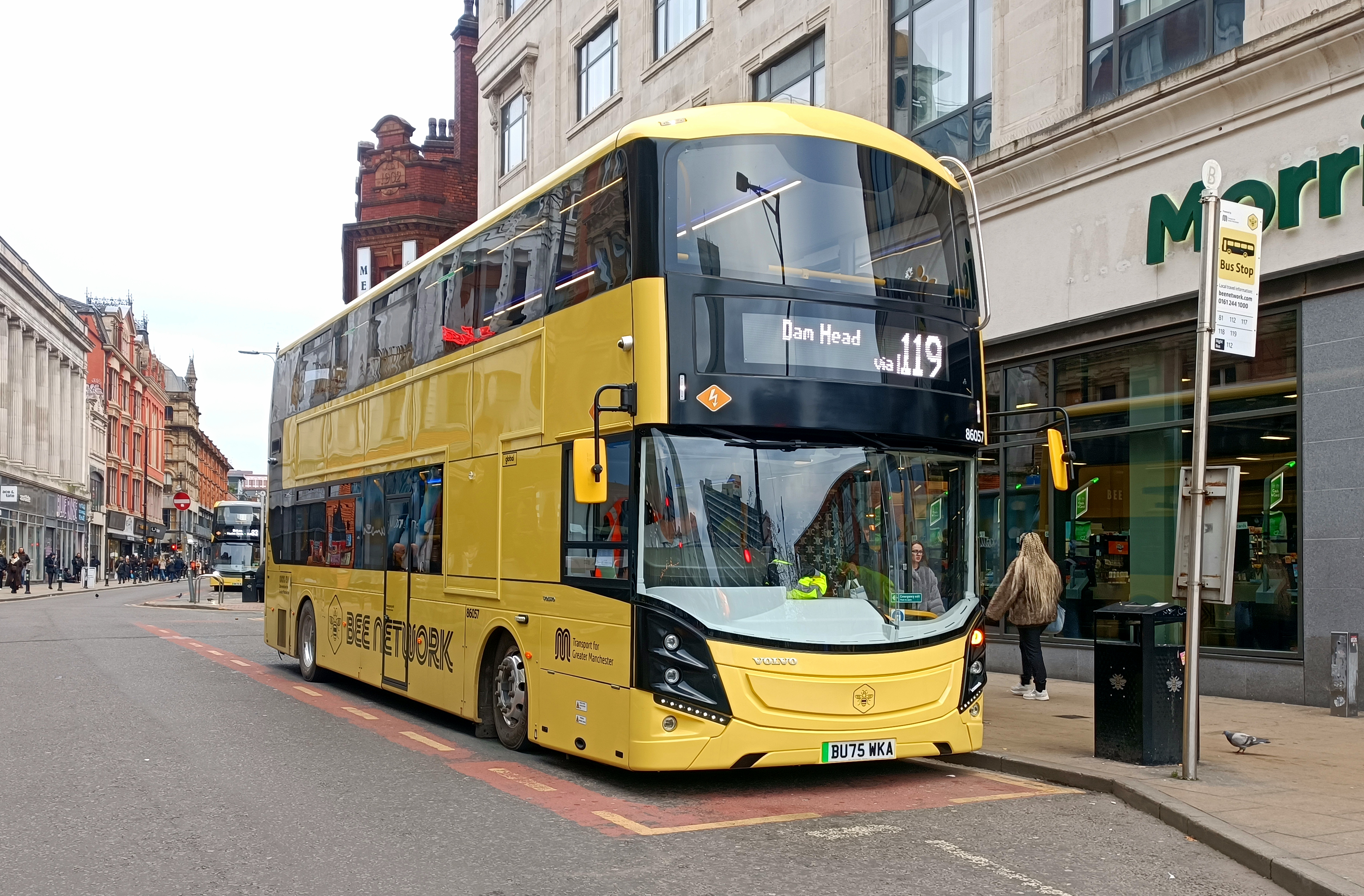
Buses at Piccadilly Gardens bus station

The city has one of the most extensive bus networks outside London. Before the rollout of Bee Network bus franchising across three tranches between 24 September 2023 and 5 January 2025, there were over 50 bus companies operating in the Greater Manchester region radiating from the city. In 2011, 80% of public transport journeys in Greater Manchester were made by bus, amounting to 220 million passenger journeys each year.

After deregulation in 1986, the bus system was taken over by GM Buses, which after privatisation was split into GM Buses North and GM Buses South; these were taken over by First Greater Manchester and Stagecoach Manchester respectively. Much of the First Greater Manchester business was sold to Diamond North West and Go North West in 2019. Stagecoach Manchester, one of the Stagecoach Group's largest subsidiaries and formerly the largest bus operator in Greater Manchester, operates a two-route zero-fare free bus network, which runs between the city's business districts and major transport hubs.

=== Air ===
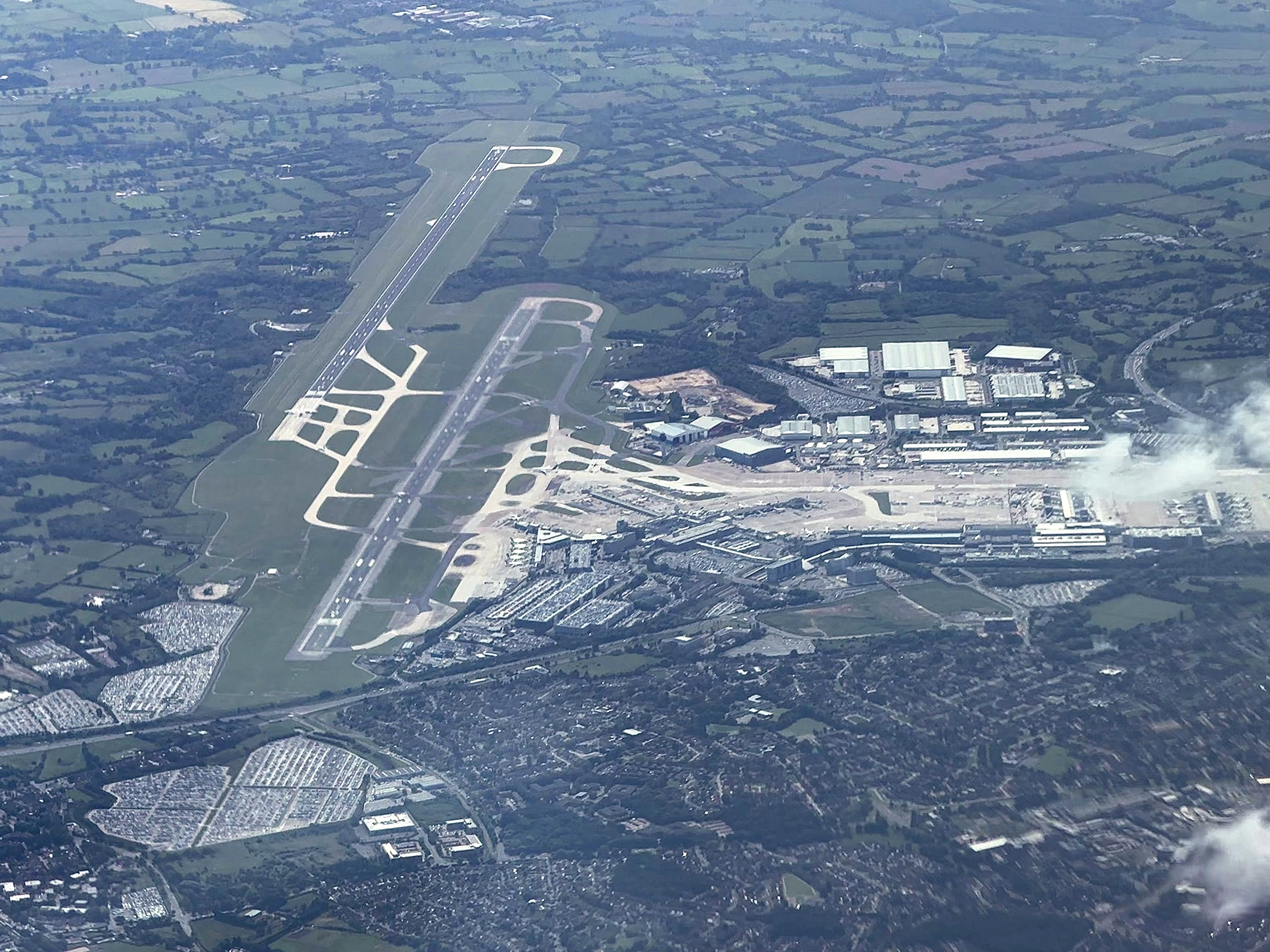
Manchester Airport from above

Manchester Airport is the third busiest in the United Kingdom, with over double the number of annual passengers of the next busiest non-London airport. Some 49 airlines operate from the airport, serving just under 200 destinations. It is the only airport in the UK outside London to have two fully-operational runways. It is a "Category 10" airport, able to handle "Code F" aircraft, including the Airbus A380, one of only 17 airports in the world and one of only three UK airports to operate the A380.

A smaller Manchester Barton Aerodrome exists 9.3 km (6 mi) to the west of Manchester city centre. It was Manchester's first municipal airport, site of the first air traffic control tower in the UK, and the first municipal airfield to be licensed by the Air Ministry. Private charter flights and general aviation use City. It also has a flight school, and both the Greater Manchester Police Air Support Unit and the North West Air Ambulance have helicopters based there.

=== Canal ===
An extensive canal network passes through Manchester including the Ashton Canal, Rochdale Canal and Bridgewater Canal – all of which end in Manchester city centre. The canals are still maintained, though now largely repurposed for leisure use. The Manchester Ship Canal, which was built to carry freight from the Industrial Revolution onward, ends in neighbouring Salford before linking with the River Irwell which runs through the north of the city.

=== Cycling ===
Cycling for transportation and leisure is popular in Manchester, and the city plays a major role in British cycle racing. As of 2023, 2% of journeys in Manchester are made by bicycle, with cycle routes being integrated into Manchester's multimodal Bee Network alongside walking, train, tram, and bus routes.

== Culture ==
=== Music ===
Manchester acts of the 1960s include the Hollies, Herman's Hermits, and Davy Jones of the Monkees, and the earlier Bee Gees, who grew up in Chorlton. In the 1980s, Manchester was credited as the driving force behind British indie music led by the Smiths, later including the Stone Roses, Happy Mondays, and James. The later groups came from the Madchester scene that centred on the Haçienda nightclub developed by the founder of Factory Records, Tony Wilson. The former Smiths frontman Morrissey, whose lyrics often refer to Manchester, later found international success as a solo artist. Oasis formed in Manchester in 1991. Rap artists from Manchester include Bugzy Malone, Aitch, and Meekz.

Brass band music, a tradition in the north of England, is important to Manchester's musical heritage; some of the UK's leading bands, such as the CWS Manchester Band and the Fairey Band, are from Manchester and surrounding areas, and the Whit Friday brass-band contest takes place annually in the neighbouring areas of Saddleworth and Tameside.

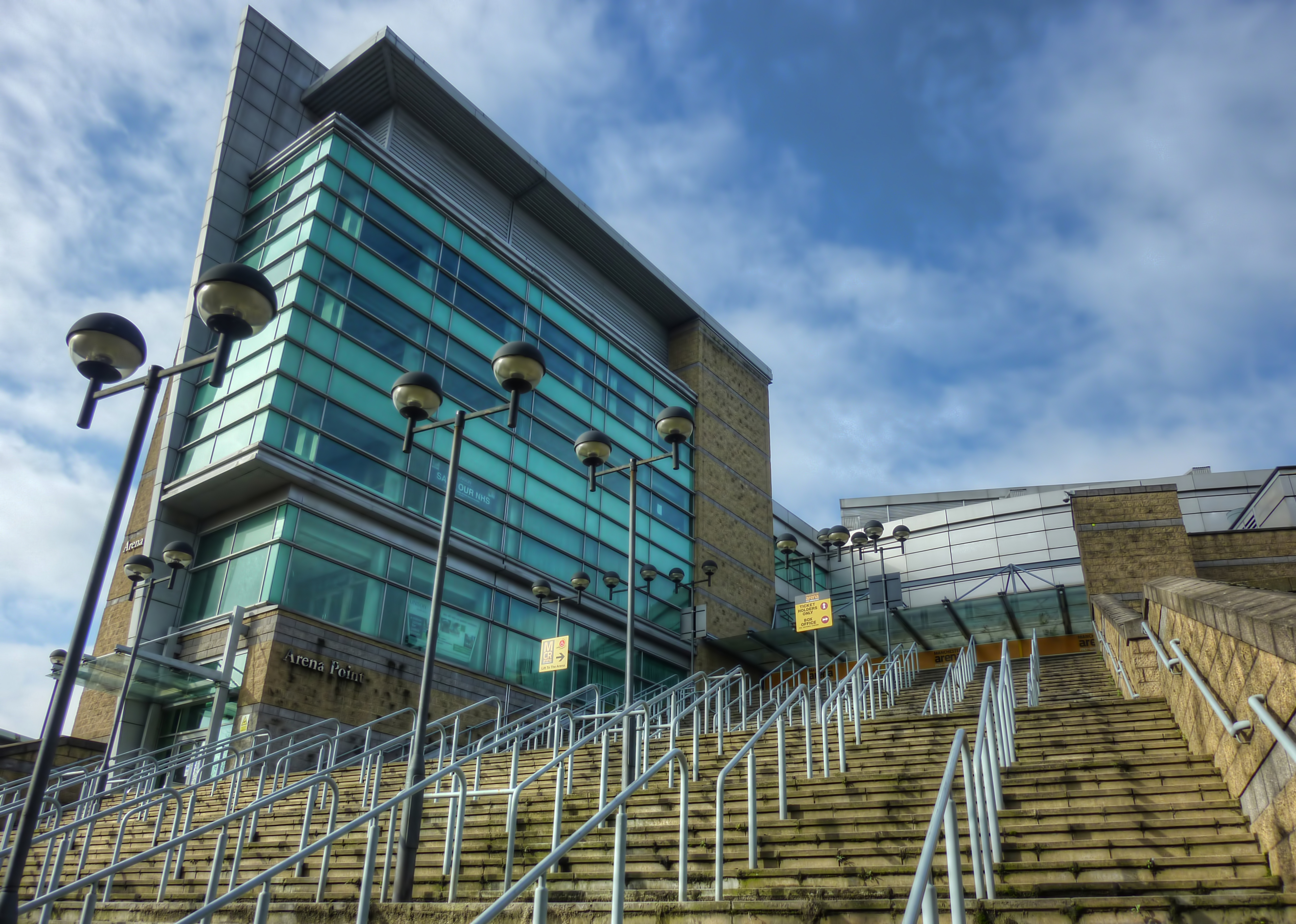
The Manchester Arena, the city's premier indoor multi-use venue and one of the largest purpose-built arenas in Europe

Manchester's main pop music venue is Manchester Arena, voted "International Venue of the Year" in 2007. With over 21,000 seats, it is the second largest arena of its type in Europe. In terms of concertgoers, as of 2008 it is the busiest indoor arena in the world. Other venues include Manchester Apollo, Albert Hall, Victoria Warehouse, Manchester Academy and the Co-op Live arena, the latter being the largest indoor arena in the UK by capacity, and the third largest in the world. Smaller venues include the Band on the Wall, the Night and Day Café, the Ruby Lounge, The Deaf Institute, and Gorilla. Manchester also has the most indie and rock music events outside London.

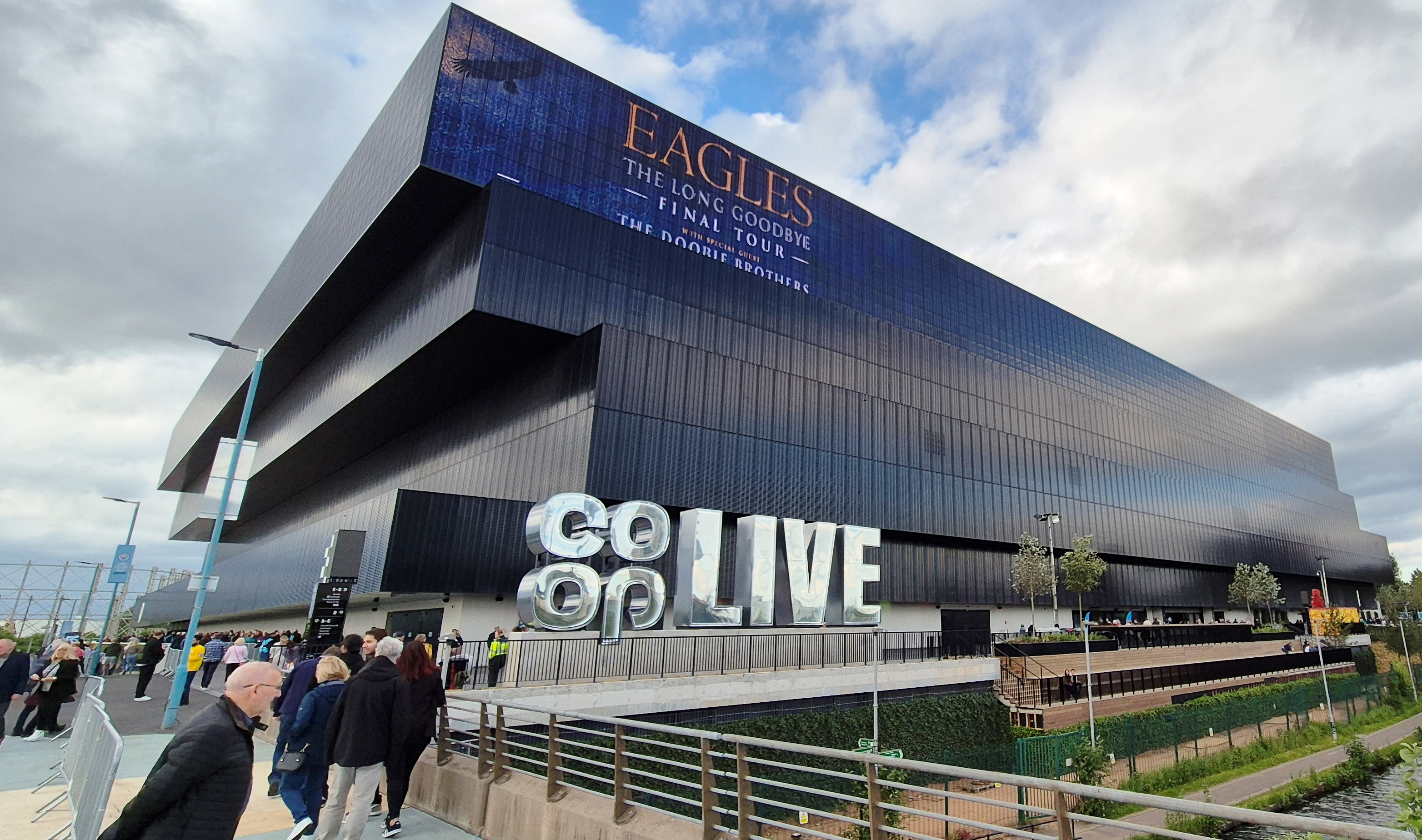
Co-Op Live Arena

Manchester has two symphony orchestras, the Hallé and the BBC Philharmonic, and a chamber orchestra, the Manchester Camerata. In the 1950s, the city was home to a "Manchester School" of classical composers, which comprised Harrison Birtwistle, Peter Maxwell Davies, David Ellis and Alexander Goehr. Manchester is a centre for musical education with the Royal Northern College of Music and Chetham's School of Music. Forerunners of the RNCM were the Northern School of Music (founded 1920) and the Royal Manchester College of Music (founded 1893), which merged in 1973. The main classical music venue was the Free Trade Hall on Peter Street until the opening in 1996 of the 2,500 seat Bridgewater Hall.

=== Performing arts ===
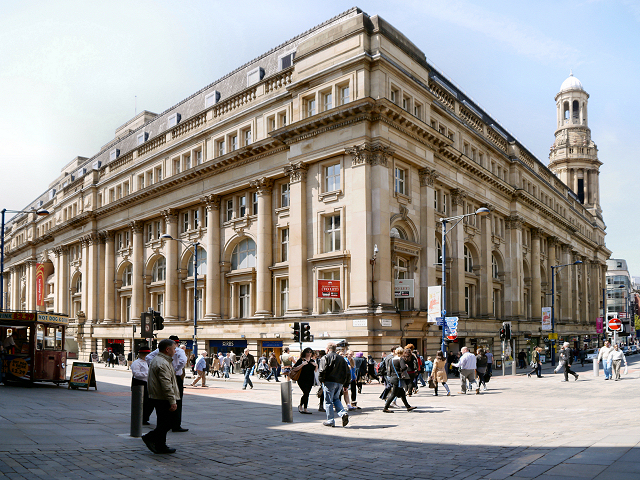
The Royal Exchange, whose eponymous theatre is the largest of its kind in the UK

Manchester is a cultural centre for theatre and the performing arts, with several large venues including the Manchester Opera House, which features large-scale touring shows and West End productions; the Palace Theatre, which despite near-closure in the 1970s is now one of the most successful in the country; and the Royal Exchange Theatre in Manchester's former cotton exchange, the largest theatre in the round in the UK. Smaller venues include the Contact Theatre. The Dancehouse on Oxford Road is dedicated to dance productions. In 2014, HOME, an arts complex with two theatre spaces, five cinemas and an art exhibition space, opened; it replaced the Cornerhouse and The Library Theatre. Since 2007, the city has hosted the Manchester International Festival, a biennial international arts festival focusing on original work.

=== Museums and galleries ===
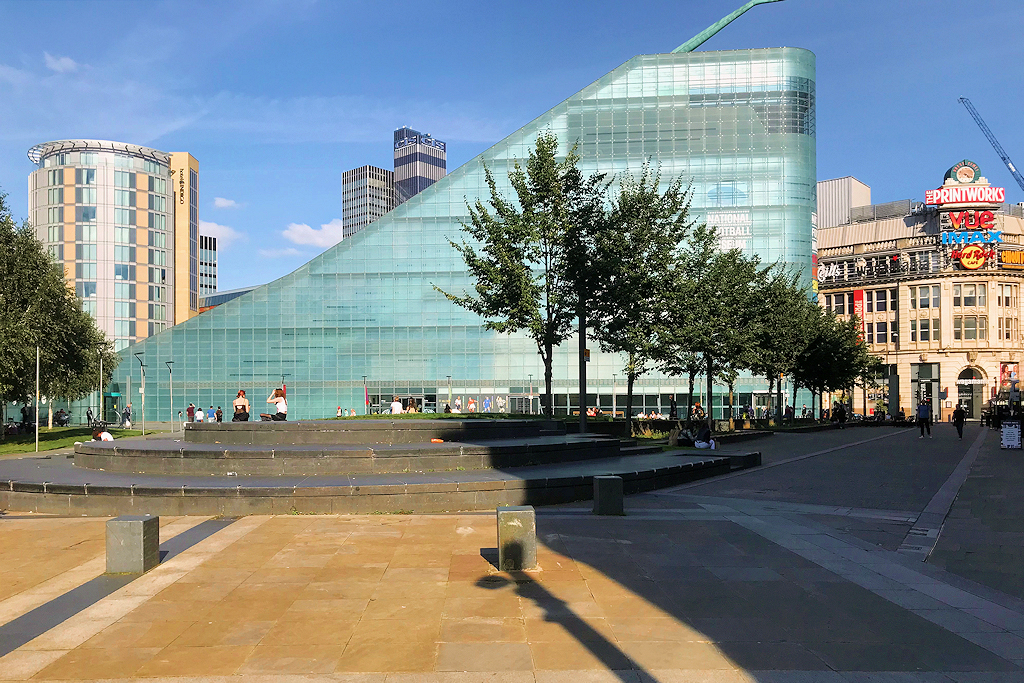
The National Football Museum

The Science and Industry Museum, housed in the former Liverpool Road railway station, has a collection of steam locomotives, industrial machinery, aircraft and a replica of Manchester Baby, the world's first stored computer. The Museum of Transport displays a collection of historic buses and trams. The Manchester Museum, opened to the public in the 1880s, has Egyptology and natural history collections. Other local exhibition spaces and museums include the National Football Museum at Urbis, Castlefield Gallery, the Manchester Costume Gallery at Platt Fields Park, the People's History Museum and the Manchester Jewish Museum. A reconstructed part of the Roman fort of Mamucium is open to the public in Castlefield.

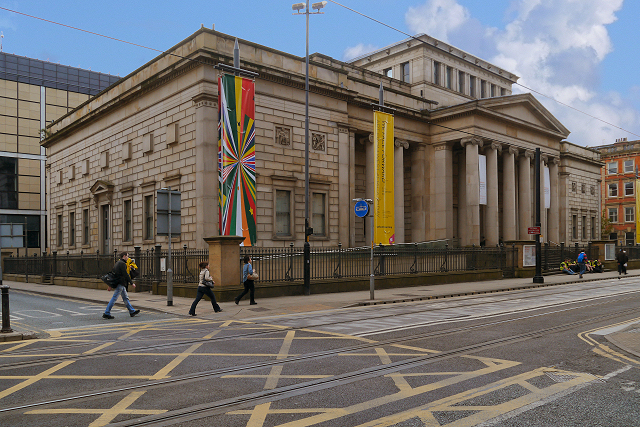
Manchester Art Gallery

The municipally owned Manchester Art Gallery houses a permanent collection of European painting and one of Britain's main collections of Pre-Raphaelite paintings. The Whitworth Art Gallery displays modern art, sculpture and textiles and was voted Museum of the Year in 2015. The work of Stretford-born painter L. S. Lowry, known for "matchstick" paintings of industrial Manchester and Salford, can be seen in the City and Whitworth Manchester galleries.

=== Literature ===
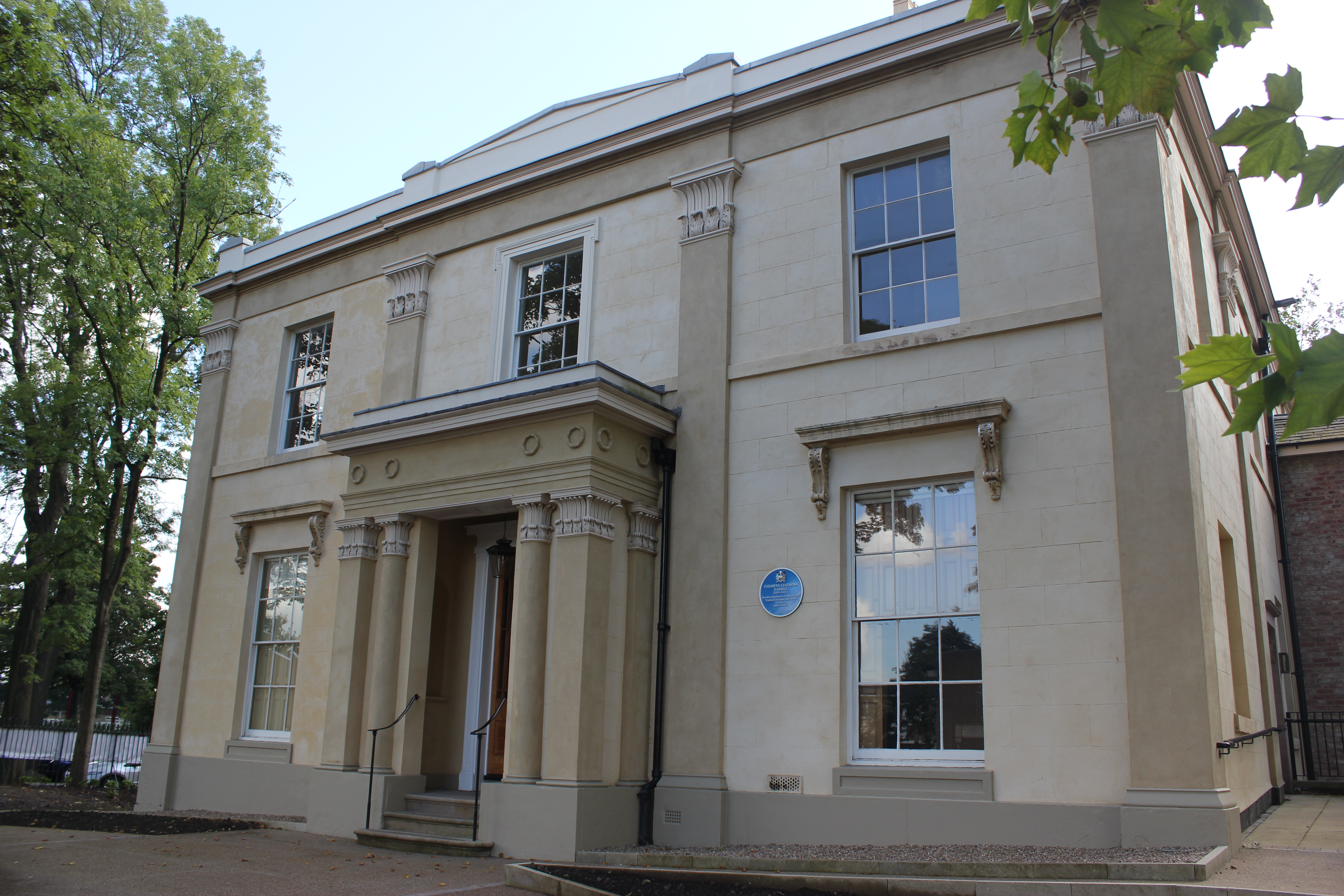
Gaskell House, where Mrs Gaskell wrote most of her novels. The house is now a museum.

Manchester is a UNESCO City of Literature known for a "radical literary history". 19th-century works highlighted the changes that industrialisation had brought to the city, including Elizabeth Gaskell's novel Mary Barton: A Tale of Manchester Life (1848), and Letitia Landon's poetical illustration Manchester (1835). The Condition of the Working Class in England in 1844 was written about the city by Friedrich Engels while resident. Manchester was the meeting place of Engels and Karl Marx, where the two began writing The Communist Manifesto in Chetham's Library. The John Rylands Library holds a collection of early printing including the Rylands Library Papyrus P52, believed to be the earliest extant New Testament text.

The novel Hard Times (1854) by Charles Dickens is reputed to have been set in Manchester and Preston. Jane Eyre was written by Charlotte Brontë in 1846, while she was staying in her lodgings in Hulme. She probably envisioned Manchester Cathedral churchyard as the burial place for Jane's parents and the birthplace of Jane herself.

Gaskell penned all her novels but Mary Barton at her home in 84 Plymouth Grove, Manchester. Her house would host influential authors of the time, such as Dickens, Brontë, Harriet Beecher Stowe and Charles Eliot Norton. Isabella Banks was born in the city and wrote The Manchester Man (1876). Author Frances Hodgson Burnett was born in the city's Cheetham Hill district in 1849. Anthony Burgess is among the 20th-century writers who lived in Manchester, writing the dystopian satire A Clockwork Orange in 1962. Dame Carol Ann Duffy, Poet Laureate from 2009 to 2019, moved to the city in 1996 and lives in West Didsbury, a village contiguous within the city.

=== Nightlife ===
The night-time economy of Manchester has expanded significantly since 1993, with investment from breweries in bars, public houses and clubs, along with active support from the local authorities. The more than 500 licensed premises in the city centre have a capacity to serve more than 250,000 visitors, with 110,000–130,000 people visiting on a typical weekend night, making Manchester the most popular city for events at 79 per thousand people. The night-time economy has a value of about £100 million, and supports 12,000 jobs. In 2024, Manchester was voted the 8th best city in the world for nightlife, with voters highlighting its variety and inclusivity for different tastes and backgrounds.

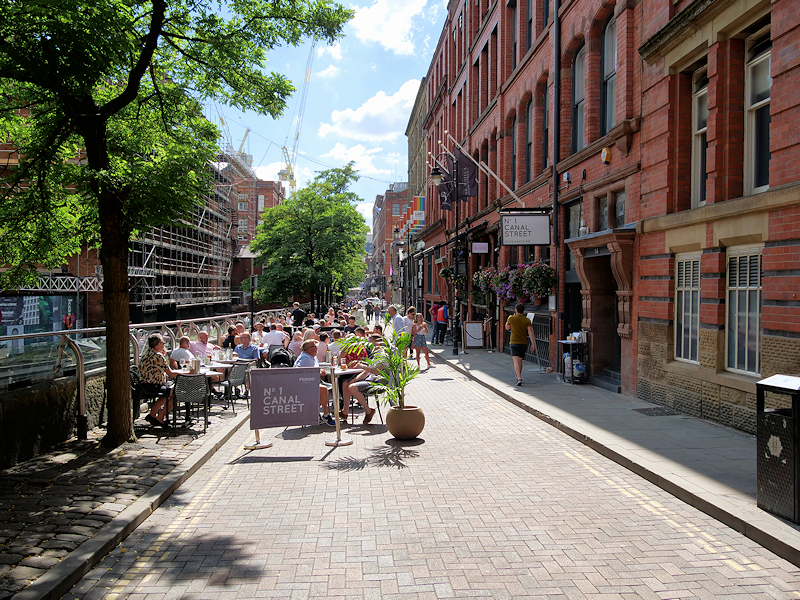
Canal Street, the centre of Manchester's gay village

=== Gay village ===
Public houses in the Canal Street area have had an LGBTQ+ clientele since at least 1940 and now form the centre of Manchester's LGBTQ+ community and gay village. Critics of the area have described it as a "gay ghetto" and argued that its general popularity has led to a decreased focus on LGBTQ rights and inclusion. Since the opening of new bars and clubs, the area attracts 20,000 visitors each weekend and hosted the Manchester Pride festival each August since 1985. Despite its high attendance, Manchester Pride received criticism from within the LGBT community dating as far back as 2007 due to its decisions on where to spend its revenue.

== Education ==
=== Schooling ===
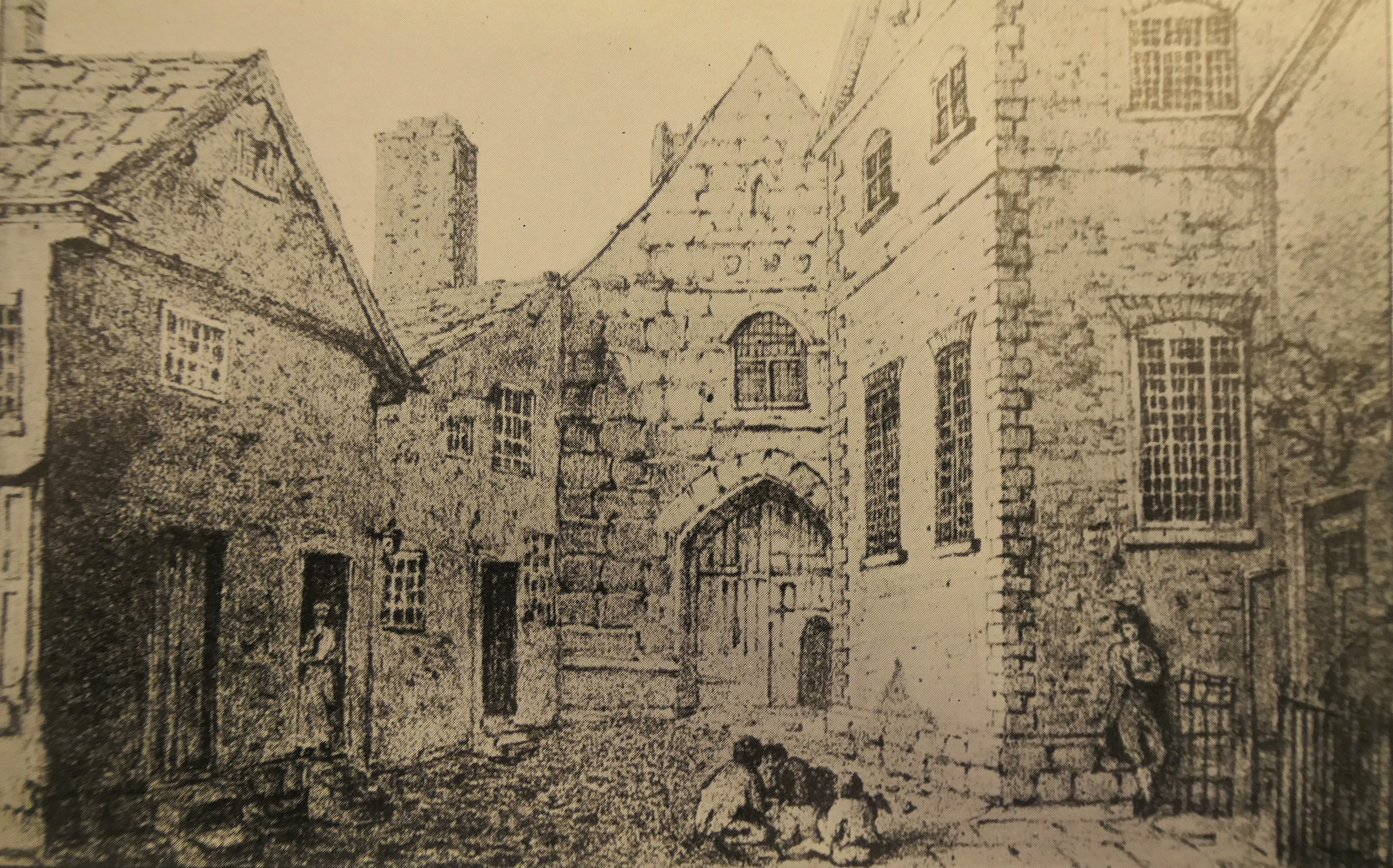
The original building of Manchester Grammar School

In 2019, the Manchester Local Education Authority (LEA) was ranked second to last out of Greater Manchester's ten LEAs and 140th out of 151 in the country LEAs based on the percentage of pupils attaining grades 4 or above in English and mathematics GCSEs (General Certificate of Secondary Education) with 56.2% compared with the national average of 64.9%. Of the 63 secondary schools in the LEA, four had 80% or more pupils achieving Grade 4 or above in English and maths GCSEs: Manchester High School for Girls, The King David High School, Manchester Islamic High School for Girls, and Kassim Darwish Grammar School for Boys. The Manchester Grammar School, established in 1515 in the city, is the largest private day school for boys in the United Kingdom.

=== Higher education ===
There are three universities in the City of Manchester: the University of Manchester, Manchester Metropolitan University and the Royal Northern College of Music. The three universities are grouped around Oxford Road on the southern side of the city centre, which forms Europe's largest urban higher-education precinct. They have a combined population of over 80,000 students as of 2022.

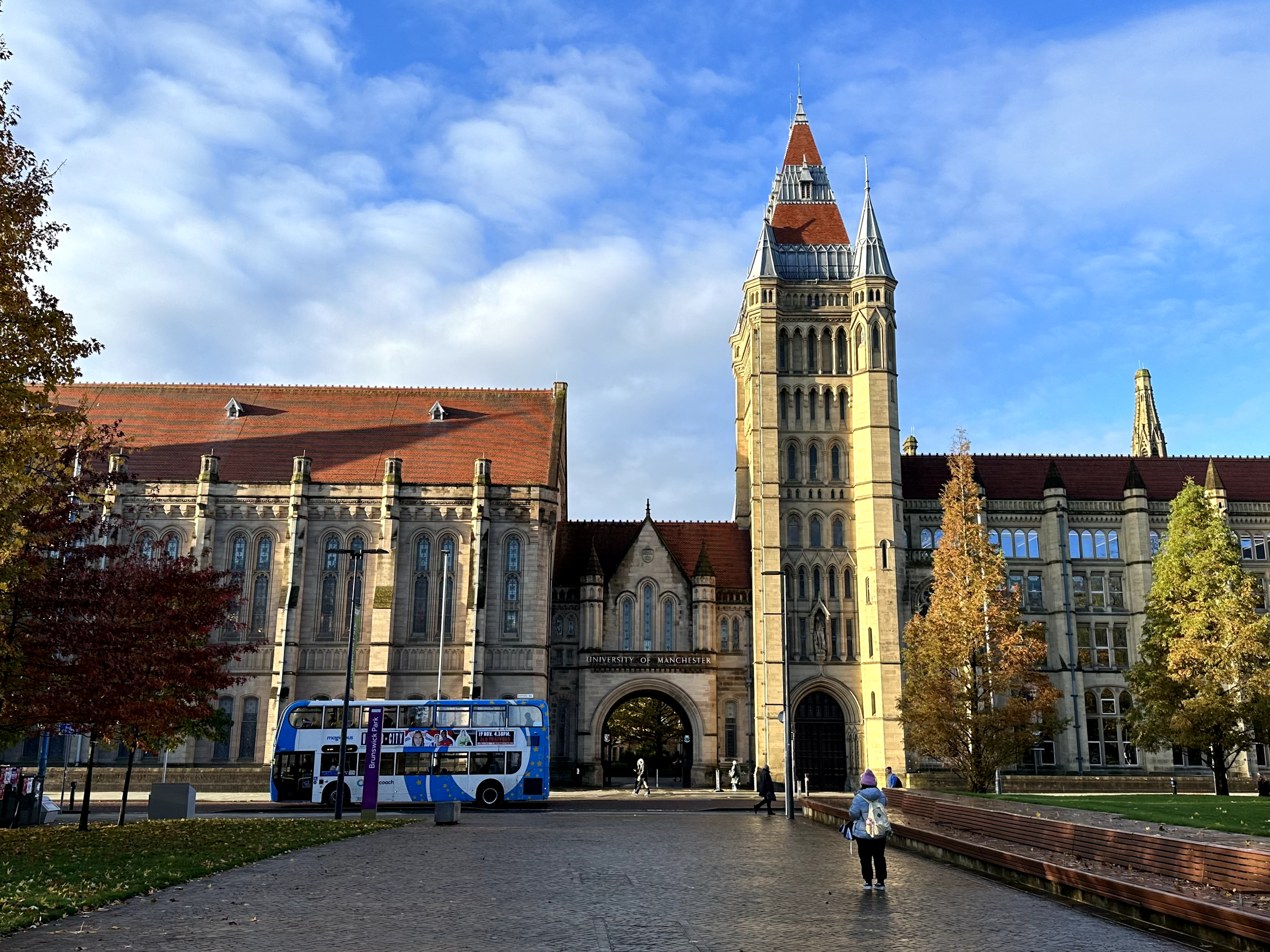
Whitworth Building, University of Manchester

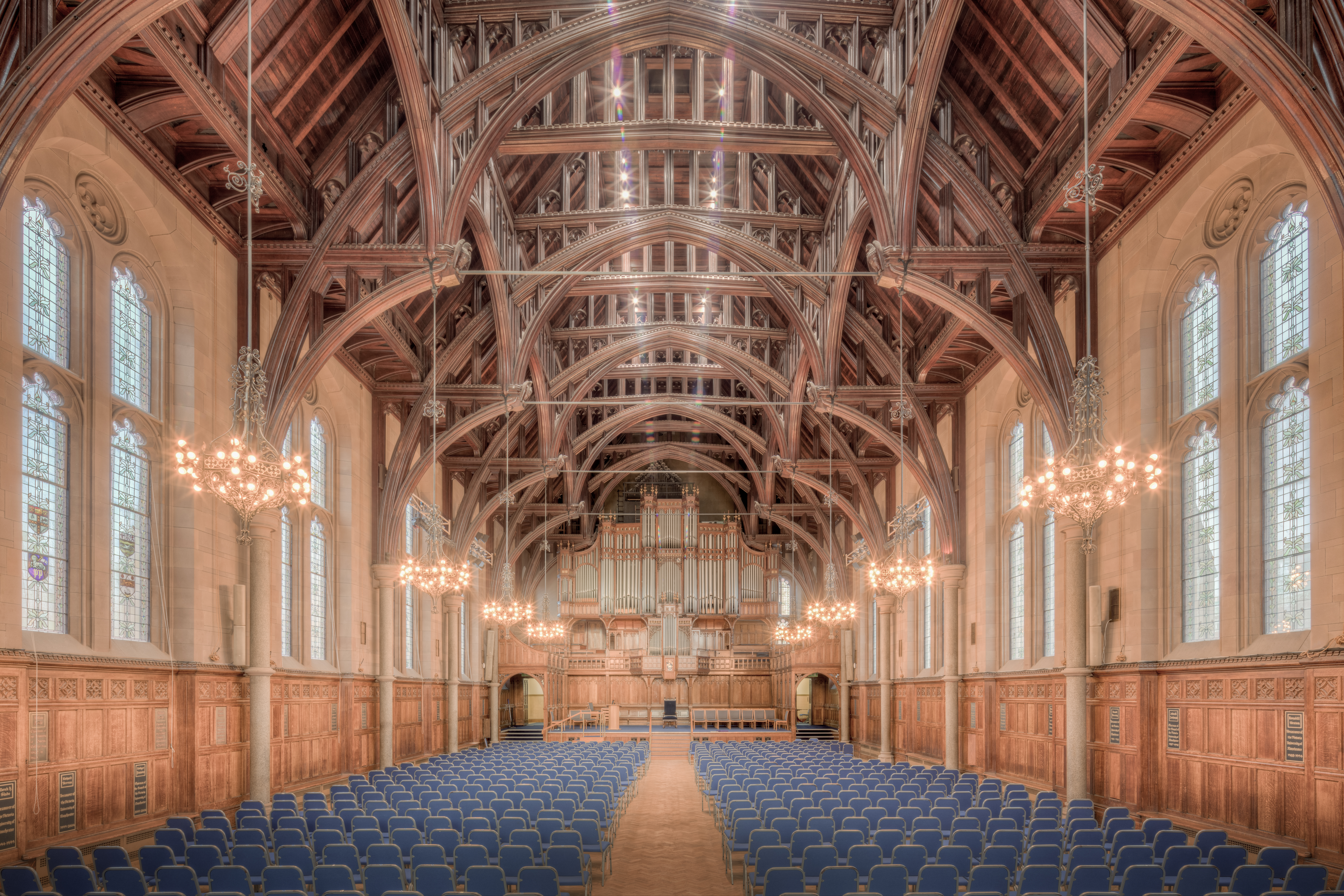
The interior of the hall in the Whitworth Building

The University of Manchester is the second largest full-time non-collegiate university in the United Kingdom, and was created in 2004 through the merger of Victoria University of Manchester and the University of Manchester Institute of Science and Technology. The University of Manchester also includes the Manchester Business School, which offered the first Master of Business Administration course in the UK in 1965. It is one of the 24 universities that form the Russell Group, having been a founding member in 1994. The university has been the site of scientific developments: Ernest Rutherford led a team which first discovered the nuclear atom and inaugurated the beginnings of nuclear physics in 1919; Frederic C. Williams, Tom Kilburn and Geoff Tootill developed the world's first stored-program computer, the Manchester Baby, in 1948; and Andre Geim and Konstantin Novoselov first isolated graphene in 2004.

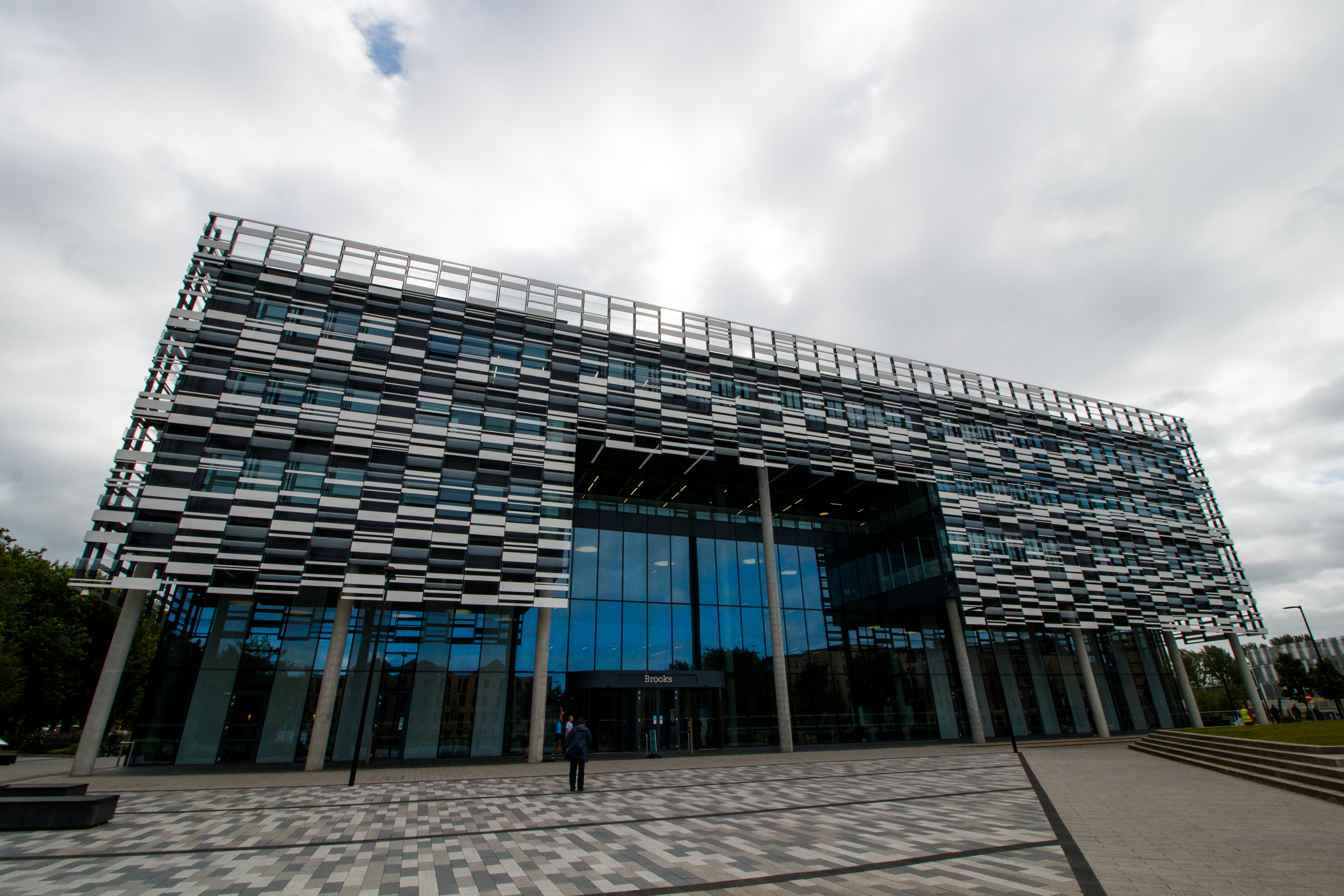
Brooks Building, Manchester Metropolitan University

Manchester Metropolitan University was formed as Manchester Polytechnic on the merger of three colleges in 1970. It gained university status in 1992, and in the same year absorbed Crewe and Alsager College of Higher Education in South Cheshire. The Cheshire campus permanently closed in 2019. The University of Law, the largest provider of vocation legal training in Europe, has a campus in the city.

== Sport ==
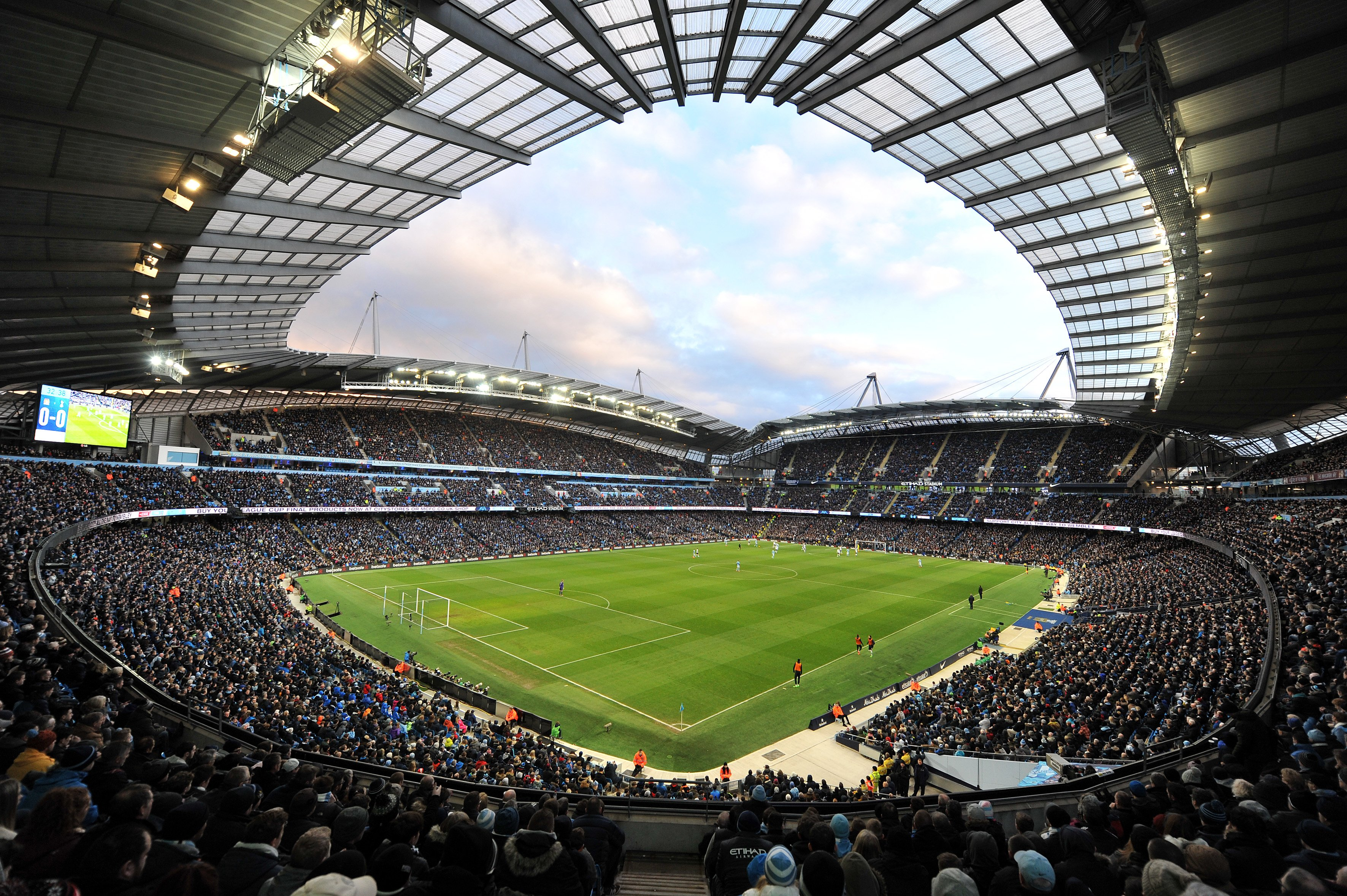
The Etihad Stadium is home to Premier League club Manchester City F.C. and host stadium for the 2002 Commonwealth Games.

Two Premier League football clubs bear the city's name – Manchester City and Manchester United. Manchester City's home is the City of Manchester Stadium in east Manchester, built for the 2002 Commonwealth Games and then reconfigured as a football ground in 2003. Manchester United, despite originating in Manchester, have been based in the neighbouring borough of Trafford since 1910. Their stadium Old Trafford is adjacent to Lancashire County Cricket Club ground, also called Old Trafford. The cricket club has strong association with Manchester due to proximity to the city and Manchester historically being part of Lancashire.

Sporting facilities built for the 2002 Commonwealth Games include the City of Manchester Stadium, National Squash Centre and Manchester Aquatics Centre. Manchester has competed twice to host the Olympic Games, beaten by Atlanta for 1996 and Sydney for 2000. The National Cycling Centre includes a velodrome, BMX Arena and Mountainbike trials, and is the home of British Cycling, UCI ProTeam Team Sky and Sky Track Cycling. The Manchester Velodrome, built as a part of the bid for the 2000 games, has become a catalyst for British success in cycling.

The velodrome hosted the UCI Track Cycling World Championships for a record third time in 2008. The National Indoor BMX Arena (2,000 capacity) adjacent to the velodrome opened in 2011. The Manchester Arena hosted the FINA World Swimming Championships in 2008. Manchester hosted the 2008 World Squash Championships, the 2010 World Lacrosse Championship, the 2013 Ashes series, the 2013 Rugby League World Cup, the 2015 Rugby World Cup, the 2019 Ashes series, and the 2019 Cricket World Cup.

== Media ==
=== Print ===
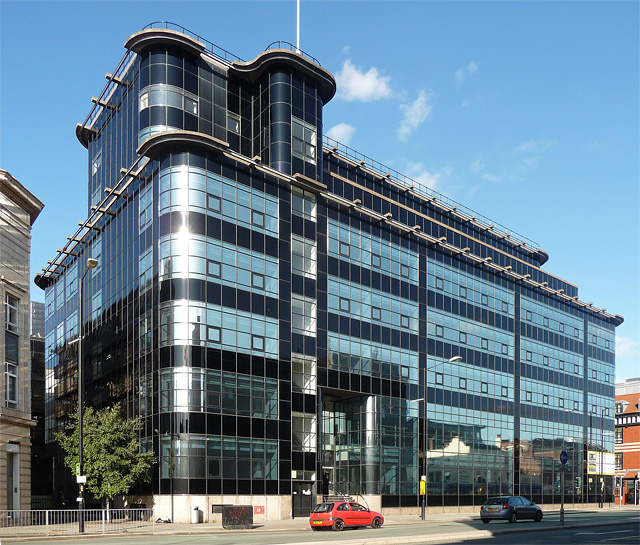
The 1930s Art Deco Express Building on Great Ancoats Street, a remnant of Britain's "second Fleet Street"

The Guardian newspaper was founded in the city in 1821 as The Manchester Guardian. Until 2008, its head office was still in the city, though many of its management functions were moved to London in 1964. For many years most national newspapers had offices in Manchester: The Daily Telegraph, Daily Express, Daily Mail, Daily Mirror, The Sun. At its height, 1,500 journalists were employed, earning the city the nickname "second Fleet Street". In the 1980s the titles closed their northern offices and centred their operations in London.

An attempt to launch a Northern daily newspaper, the North West Times, employing journalists made redundant by other titles, closed in 1988. Another attempt was made with the North West Enquirer, which hoped to provide a true "regional" newspaper for the North West, much in the same vein as the Yorkshire Post does for Yorkshire or The Northern Echo does for the North East; it folded in October 2006.

The main regional newspaper in the city is the Manchester Evening News, which was for over 80 years the sister publication of The Manchester Guardian. The Manchester Evening News has the largest circulation of a UK regional evening newspaper and is distributed free of charge in the city centre on Thursdays and Fridays, but paid for in the suburbs. Despite its title, it is available all day. Several local weekly free papers are distributed by the MEN group. The Metro North West is available free at Metrolink stops, rail stations and other busy locations.

=== Film and television ===
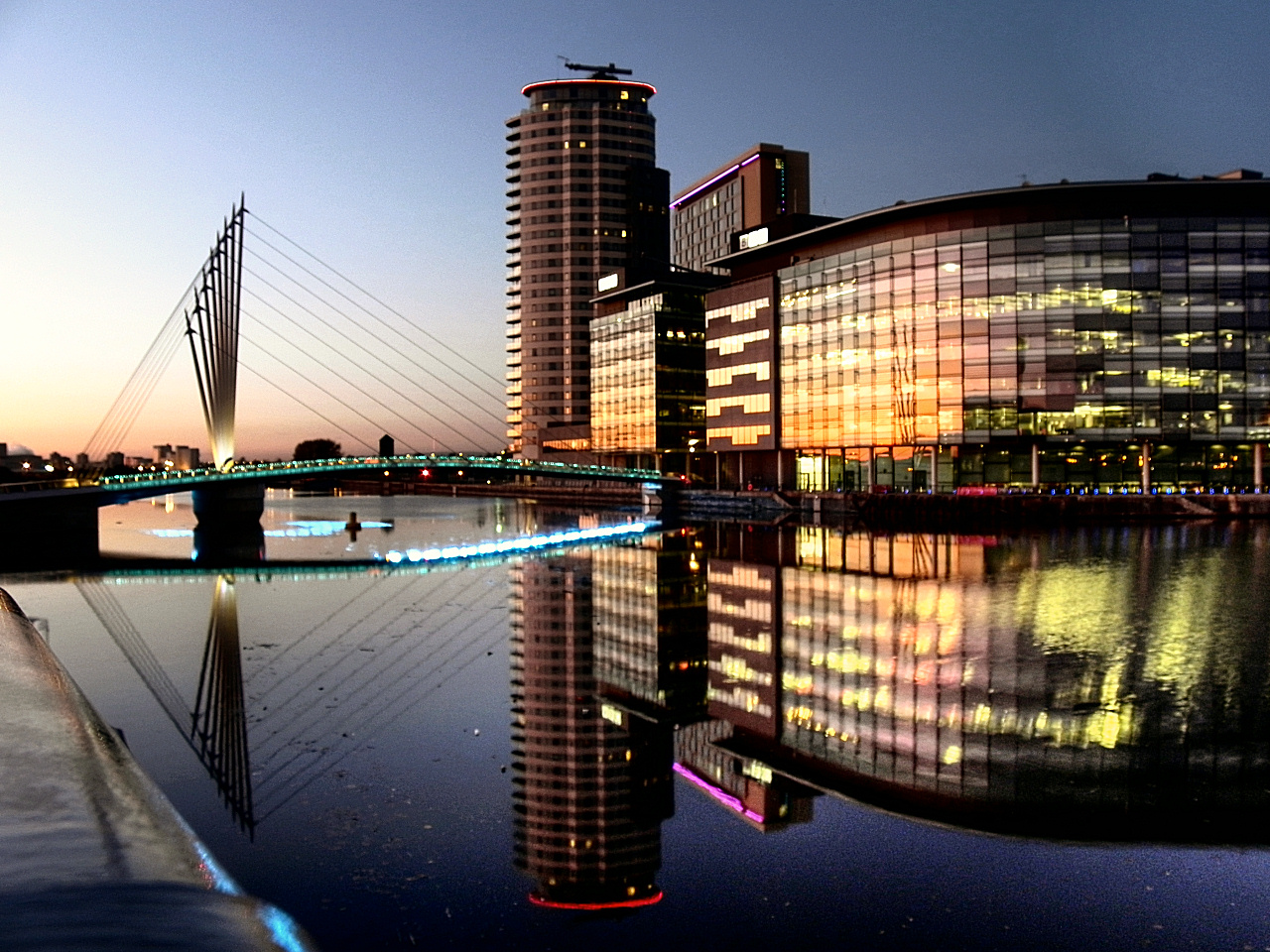
MediaCityUK

Manchester has been a centre of television broadcasting since the 1950s, with several television studios in operation. The ITV franchise Granada Television has been based in Manchester since 1954. Now based at MediaCityUK, the company's former headquarters at Granada Studios on Quay Street with its distinctive illuminated sign were a prominent landmark on the Manchester skyline for several decades. Granada produces Coronation Street, local news and programmes for North West England. Manchester is also covered by an internet television channel called Manchester TV.

With the growth in regional television in the 1950s, Manchester became one of the BBC's three main centres in England. In 1954, the BBC opened its first regional BBC Television studio outside London, Dickenson Road Studios, in a converted Methodist chapel in Rusholme. The first edition of Top of the Pops was broadcast there on New Year's Day 1964. From 1975, BBC programmes including Mastermind and Real Story were made at New Broadcasting House on Oxford Road. Cutting It and The Street were set in Manchester, as was Life on Mars. Manchester was the regional base for BBC One North West Region programmes before it relocated to MediaCityUK.

=== Radio ===
Manchester has a large number of licensed radio stations, including a range of local stations such as BBC Radio Manchester, Hits Radio Manchester, Capital Manchester and Lancashire, Greatest Hits Radio Manchester & The North West, Heart North West, Smooth North West, Gold, and Radio X. It has over 28 DAB stations, which Digital Radio UK suggests make Manchester the world's largest DAB multiplex. Student radio stations include Fuse FM at the University of Manchester and MMU Radio at the Manchester Metropolitan University. A community radio network is coordinated by Radio Regen, with stations covering Ardwick, Longsight and Levenshulme (All FM 96.9) and Wythenshawe (Wythenshawe FM 97.2).

== Notable people ==
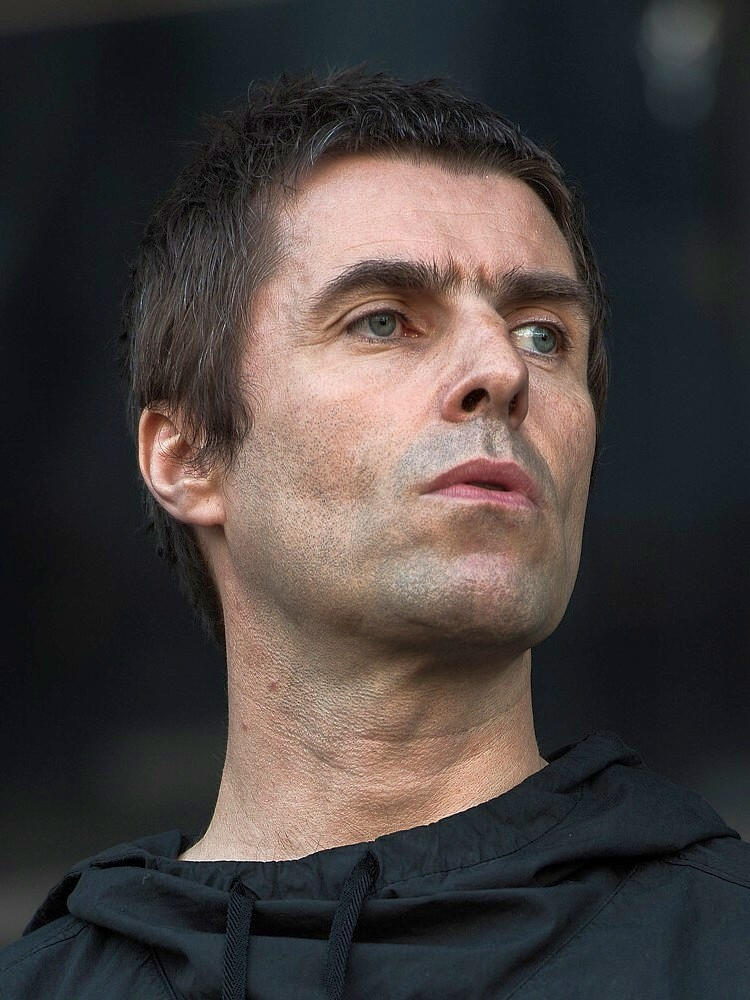
Liam Gallagher was born in the Longsite suburb of Manchester

Notable people from Manchester include:

- Oasis members Noel Gallagher and Liam Gallagher
- Morrissey, lead singer of The Smiths
- Brian Cox, physicist and TV presenter
- Emmeline Pankhurst, leader of British suffragette movement
- J.J. Thomson, physicist who discovered the electron
- Tyson Fury, heavyweight boxing champion
- Anthony Burgess, author

== International relations ==
The expansion of international trade links during the Industrial Revolution led to the introduction of the first consuls in the 1820s and since then over 800, from all parts of the world, have been based in Manchester. Manchester hosts consular services for most of the north of England.

=== Sister cities ===
Manchester has been twinned with Chemnitz, Germany since 1983, and Wuhan, China since 1986. Greater Manchester is twinned with Osaka, Japan, since 2025 and also cooperates with numerous other cities.

=== Friendship agreements ===
In addition to its sister cities, Manchester has friendly relations with:

- Aalborg, Denmark
- Aarhus, Denmark
- Córdoba, Spain
- Faisalabad, Pakistan (1997)
- Gumi, South Korea
- Haidian (Beijing), China
- Kagoshima, Japan
- Los Angeles, United States (2009)
- Rehovot, Israel

=== Diplomatic missions ===
Manchester has the largest group of consulates in England outside London. (Note: Manchester formally had: an Australian consulate, which closed in 2001; an Iranian consulate, which closed in 1987); and a US consulate, which closed in 1963.) The current consulate-generals, unless otherwise noted, are:

- Bangladesh (Assistant High Commission)
- China (Consulate)
- Czech Republic
- Greece
- Hungary
- India
- Iraq
- Ireland
- Italy (Consulate)
- Libya
- Pakistan
- Poland
- Portugal
- Romania
- Spain
- Turkey

== See also ==
- List of Freemen of the City of Manchester
- Manchester dialect
