= List of civil awards and decorations =

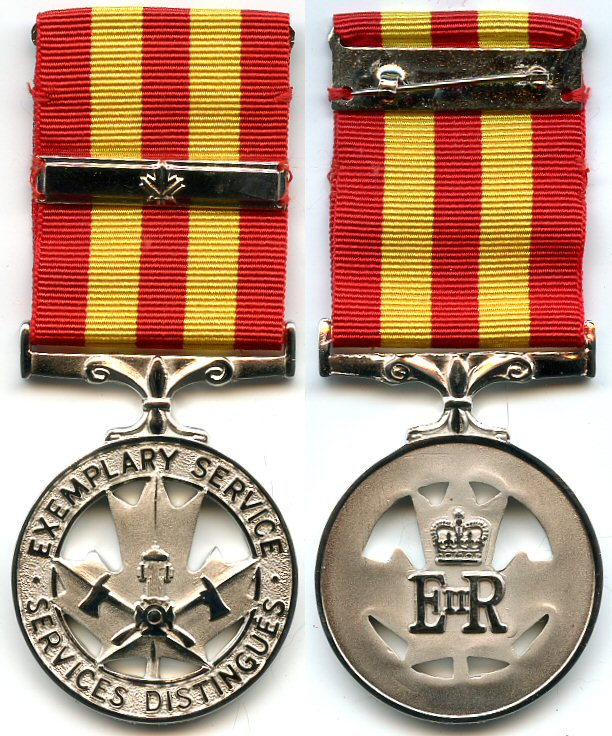
Fire Services Exemplary Service Medal

This list of civil awards and decorations is a partial index to articles about notable civil awards and decorations. It excludes Law enforcement awards and honors and ecclesiastical decorations, which are covered by separate lists. See Category:Civil awards and decorations by country for a more complete list by country.

== General ==
Country	Award	Venue / sponsor	Notes
Europe	AE-COPSD European Police Cross of Honor (Croix d’Honneur du Policier Européen)	European Association of Bodies and Public Organizations of Security and Defense	Valor or Meritorious Service
United States	Barnard Medal for Meritorious Service to Science	Columbia University	Meritorious service to science
Albania	National Flag Order	President of Albania	Extraordinary contributions for the sublimation of the Albanian nation and Albania
International	Order for the International Merit of Blood	International Federation of Blood Donor Organizations	Personalities who made a special contribution to promote the regular, anonymous, voluntary, non-remunerated gift of blood in the world
Zambia	Order of the Eagle of Zambia	Zambia	Grand Commander, Grand Officer, Officer and Member
Philippines	Outstanding Manilan Award	City of Manila	Business, communications, diplomacy, finance, public service and spiritual leadership
North Korea	People's Prize	People's Prize Awarding Commission	Best achievements in creative fields
Sweden	Right Livelihood Award	Right Livelihood Award Foundation	Practical and exemplary solutions to the most urgent challenges facing the world today
United States	Roger W. Jones Award for Executive Leadership	American University School of Public Affairs	U.S. Federal government executive leadership

== Fire service awards and honors ==
Country	Award	Notes
United States	Arthur B. Guise Medal	Awarded by the Society of Fire Protection Engineers for eminent achievement in the advancement of the science and technology of fire protection engineering
Australia	Australian Fire Service Medal	Distinguished service
United Kingdom	Colonial Fire Brigades Long Service Medal	Long service in the fire services of the colonies and overseas territories of the United Kingdom
United Kingdom	Fire Brigade Long Service and Good Conduct Medal	Long service
Canada	Fire Services Exemplary Service Medal	Long service
Soviet Union	Medal "For Courage in a Fire"	Deeds of courage and of leadership while fighting fires
New Zealand	New Zealand Fire Brigades Long Service and Good Conduct Medal	Long service
United Kingdom	Queen's Fire Service Medal	Distinguished service or gallantry

== Honorary citizens ==
Country	Award	Notes
United Kingdom	Freedom of the City of Aberdeen	
Afghanistan	List of honorary citizens of Afghanistan	
United States	List of honorary citizens of Baltimore	
Australia	List of honorary citizens of Bathurst	
United Kingdom	Honorary Freedom of the City of Birmingham	
Canada	List of Keys to the City in Canada	List of cites by province
Chechnya	List of honorary citizens of Chechnya	
United Kingdom	Freedom of the City of Belfast	
Ireland	Freedom of the City of Dublin	
Germany	List of honorary citizens of Hamburg	
United Kingdom	List of Freemen of the City of Manchester	
United Kingdom	List of Freemen of the City of Newcastle upon Tyne	
United Kingdom	List of Freemen of the City of Liverpool	
United Kingdom	Freedom of the City of London	
Russia	List of honorary citizens of Moscow	
Germany	List of honorary citizens of Munich	
Austria	List of honorary citizens of Salzburg	
Bosnia and Herzegovina	List of honorary citizens of Sarajevo	
North Macedonia	List of honorary citizens of Skopje	
Bulgaria	List of honorary citizens of Sofia	
Croatia	List of honorary citizens of Split	
Israel	List of honorary citizens of Tel Aviv	
United States	List of Keys to the City in the United States	List of cities by state
Malta	List of honorary citizens of Valletta	
Austria	List of honorary citizens of Vienna	
Lithuania	List of honorary citizens of Vilnius	

== Polar exploration ==
Country	Award	Venue / sponsor	Notes
United States	Arctic "A" Device	United States Armed Forces	Service within the Arctic Circle
Norway	Antarctic Medal	Sixth Norwegian Antarctic Expedition	
United States	Antarctica Service Medal	United States Armed Forces	Service in Antarctica
Australia	Australian Antarctic Medal	Australian National Antarctic Research Expeditions	
United States	Coast Guard Arctic Service Medal	United States Coast Guard	Service within the Arctic Circle
United States	Jeannette Medal	Jeannette expedition	1879–1881 attempt to reach the North Pole
Norway	Maudheim medal	Norwegian–British–Swedish Antarctic Expedition	
United Kingdom	Polar Medal	Monarchy of the United Kingdom	Extreme human endeavour against the appalling weather and conditions that exist in the Arctic and Antarctic
United States	United States Antarctic Expedition Medal	United States Antarctic Service Expedition	

== See also ==
- Lists of awards
- Civil awards and decorations
- Cross of Merit (disambiguation)
- List of highest civilian awards by country
