= Boris Kravtsov =

Soviet jurist and politician (born 1922)

- Борис Кравцов
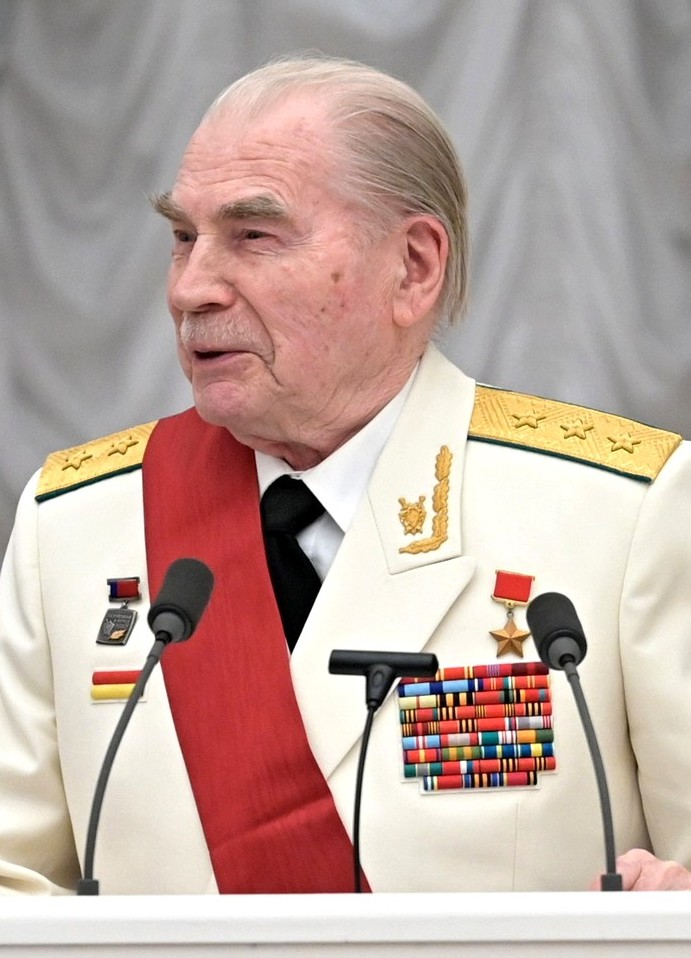
- Kravtsov in 2022

Minister of Justice of the Soviet Union
- In office 12 April 1984 – 7 June 1989
- President: Konstantin Chernenko; Andrei Gromyko; Mikhail Gorbachev
- Preceded by: Vladimir Terebilov
- Succeeded by: Veniamin Yakovlev

Personal details
- Born: 28 December 1922 (age 103) Moscow, Russian SFSR
- Party: Communist Party of the Soviet Union (1943–1991)
- Spouse: Tatyana Ivanovna Kravtsova
- Children: 2
- Education: Moscow Law School

Boris Vasilyevich Kravtsov (Russian: Борис Васильевич Кравцов; born 28 December 1922) is a Russian former jurist and politician who served as the justice minister of the Soviet Union between 1984 and 1989.

== Biography ==
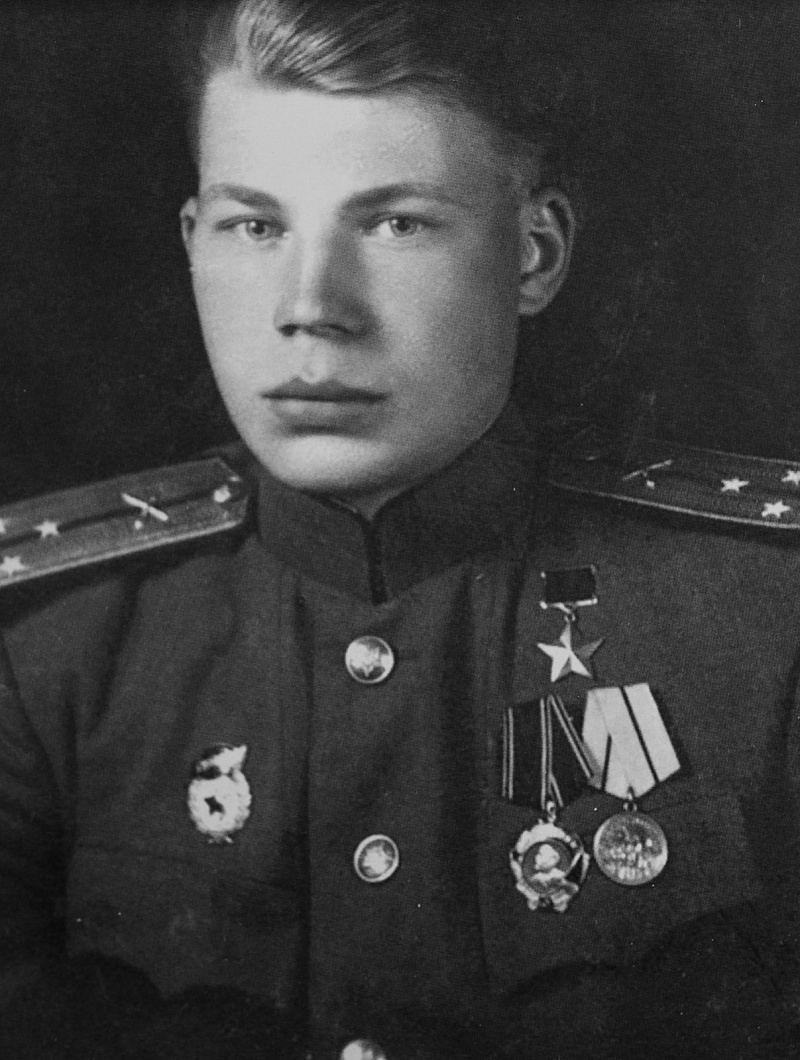
Kravtsov wearing military uniform in 1944

Kravtsov was born in Moscow on 28 December 1922. In 1941 he graduated from high school and joined the Red Army. He was part of the Soviet military forces which liberated Ukraine from the Nazi invasion. In September 1945 Kravtsov began his studies at the Moscow Law School and graduated in 1947. Following his graduation he worked as a judge in different regions. He also graduated from the All Union Correspondence Law Institute in 1952. He was named the deputy prosecutor of the Russian Soviet Federative Socialist Republic (RSFSR) in 1960 and in 1971 he became the prosecutor of the RSFSR. On 12 April 1984 he was appointed minister of justice of the Soviet Union replacing Vladimir Terebilov in the post. Kravtsov was in office until 7 June 1989.

Kravtsov was a member of the Communist Party between 1943 and 1991. He served as a deputy at the Supreme Soviet in the 11th convocation from 1984 to 1989. He retired from public office in 1989.

== Personal life ==
Kravtsov married Tatyana Ivanovna Kravtsova. He has two daughters.

=== Awards ===
For his activities in World War II Kravtsov was given the Gold Star of the Hero of the Soviet Union in May 1944. In February 2022, he was awarded the highest degree of the Order "For Merit to the Fatherland". As of 2024, he is the last living Hero of the Soviet Union who received his award during the Great Patriotic War.

Kravtsov also received the following awards:

- Honorary citizen of Moscow (29 January 2025)
- Order of Alexander Nevsky (26 December 2017)
- Order of Friendship of Peoples (7 April 1994)
- Order of Lenin (19 March 1944)
- Order of the October Revolution (27 December 1982)
- Orders of the Red Banner of Labour (25 October 1967; 31 August 1971)
- Order of the Patriotic War, 1st class (11 March 1985)
