= Kristina Sabaliauskaitė =

Lithuanian author and art historian

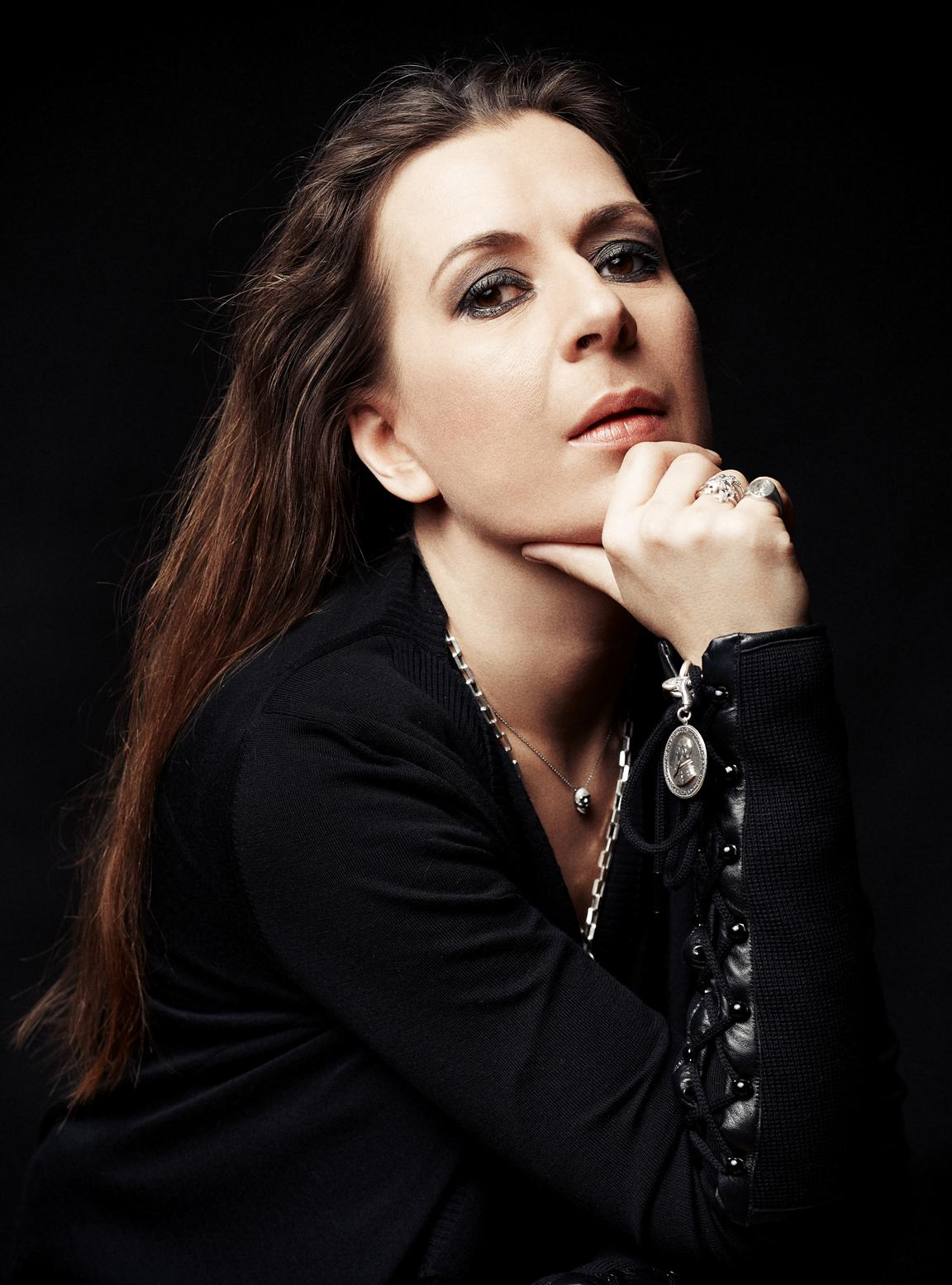
- Sabaliauskaitė in 2014
- Born: 1974 (age 51–52); Vilnius, Lithuania
- Education: Vilnius Academy of Arts (PhD, Dr.h.c.)
- Occupations: Novelist, art historian
- Writing career
- Genre: Historical
- Notable works: Silva Rerum series (2008-2016), Peter's Empress series (2019-2021)
- Notable awards: Saint Christopher Award, Doctor Honoris Causa of Vilnius Academy of Arts, Award of Two Nations, Honorary Citizen of Vilnius
- Website: sabaliauskaite.com

Kristina Sabaliauskaitė is a Lithuanian author and art historian. She is best known as the author of the series of historical novels Silva Rerum and Peter's Empress.

Sabaliauskaitė is considered to be one of the most prominent contemporary Lithuanian writers. Born in Vilnius, she has been a longtime resident of London where she worked as a foreign correspondent and columnist for Lithuania's biggest daily newspaper Lietuvos rytas from 2002 until 2010.

== Early and personal life ==
Sabaliauskaitė was born in Vilnius in 1974. From 1981 to 1992, she pursued her secondary education at the Vilnius secondary school No.23. In 1998, she graduated from the Vilnius Academy of Arts with a major in art history. In 2000, she obtained a master's degree from the Vilnius Academy of Arts, and in 2005, she completed her Ph.D. She pursued postgraduate studies at the Warburg Institute of University of London, and at the Institute of Art History of Warsaw University. She also holds a doctor honoris causa of Vilnius Academy of Arts.

== Literary career ==
=== The Silva Rerum novels ===
In 2008, she debuted with a historical novel Silva Rerum (published by Baltos lankos) about the life of a Lithuanian noble Norvaiša family in 1659–1667, the period after The Deluge. It became a bestseller of 23 editions and was pronounced 'a literary event' and 'a cultural phenomenon' in Lithuania. It was critically acclaimed and recognised by culture historians, praised for the captivating, multilayered storytelling and the great attention to historical detail. Intended from the beginning as a tetralogy, the subsequent parts of this noble family saga (each of them describing one Norvaiša family generation) were published - 'Silva Rerum II' (2011, 16 editions, about the Great Plague of 1707-1710 and the Great Northern War), 'Silva Rerum III (2014, 11 editions, set in the mid-18th century and exploring the origins of the legend of the Righteous Proselyte of Vilna, Abraham ben Abraham and the Great Fires of 1748–1749) and 'Silva Rerum IV' (2016, 8 editions, the final part of the tetralogy about the Enlightenment and the period from 1770 to Polish-Lithuanian Commonwealth partitions in 1795). All of these novels became award-winning long-term number-one bestsellers and were received with much anticipation from readers and critics, with the first print runs completely selling out in a few days (the first print run of 'Silva Rerum IV' was sold out in 3 days). 'Silva Rerum' novels have been listed many times in the critics' 'Best books lists' (2008 by the Institute of Lithuanian Literature among the twelve most creative books, 2010 among the Critic's Choice 10 most memorable Lithuanian books of the past decade, 2015 Lithuanian PEN Club List of 10 most important books of the decade).

Despite the complexity of the text, the popularity of the 'Silva Rerum' historical saga (called by critics 'a rare case of bestsellerdom meets quality literature') in Lithuania was such that due to reader's demand in 2011 the Vilnius Tourism Information Centre introduced literary guided tours of Vilnius Old Town following the places described in Sabaliauskaitė's 'Silva rerum' trilogy.

=== Peter's Empress ===
In 2019 Baltos Lankos published the first part of the dilogy 'Peter's Empress', a novel about the Lithuanian born wife of Peter I, Martha Helena Skowrońska, the Empress of Russia Catherine I. Set in the last 24 hours of the Empress' life it tells the story of her marriage as well as of the cultural clash between the East and the West in the light of Peter I reforms. It became a number one bestseller even before hitting the bookstore shelves, with the first print-run selling out via pre-order. The novel had 7 editions in the first 6 months becoming a record breaking bestseller in Lithuania. The second and final part of Peter's Empress was published in February 2021, with more than 70,000 copies sold in the first month after the release. Overall, more than 200,000 copies were sold in a country of 2.8 million.

=== Peter's Empress international acclaim ===
'Peter's Empress' was met with rave reviews in all European countries where it was published and became a bestseller with multiple reprints. In France, the novel was described as the one "of powerful charm that can be read not just a historical saga, but also like a journey through the vanished phantom landscapes. A narrative of great suspense, always balancing on the edge of utter ruin" (Le Monde), "an immense epopee following the routes of the empire which aims to expand its borders and traditions [...] With a meticulous research of a historian and the quill that is both poetic and raw at the same time, Sabaliauskaitė draws the prodigious fate not just of a woman, but also of the whole nation torn between its attraction to the Western modernity and the weight of its ancestral culture.“ (Le Figaro Magazine), "a novel of an epic scale, rough and poetic at the same time" (Le Figaro Magazine), with critic Gerard Collard proclaiming it to be "not a novel, but a storm" ('C'est n'est pas un roman, c'est un ouragan'), "an event". The Dutch edition was equally successful, with critics comparing Sabaliauskaite's storytelling power with that of Umberto Eco or Hillary Mantel), Marguerite Yourcenar, naming 'Peter's Empress' as the 'dazzling historical novel' among the best books of 2022 (NRC, The Netherlands). In Estonia 'Peter's Empress' (Part 2) became The Book of the Year 2022, receiving also glowing reviews from leading petrologist historians for its historical accuracy, calling it 'the perfect historical novel, a symbiosis of historical accuracy, a psychological and emotionally engaging biography, the true flavour and aroma of literature'.

=== Short stories collection ===
In 2012 Baltos Lankos published a selection of short stories 'Danielius Dalba & kitos istorijos' (Danielius Dalba & Other Stories) which became a number one bestseller. 8 short stories in voices of different social dialects and characters tell more recent Lithuanian history - from World War II to contemporary times, encapsulating the Polish, Jewish and Soviet Vilnius, life in emigration, the living memories of the historical traumas of the past.

In 2015 'Vilnius Wilno Vilna: Three Short Stories', taken from the collection 'Danielius Dalba & kitos istorijos' and translated into English by Romas Kinka, illustrated with photography of Jan Bułhak and Romualdas Rakauskas, was published by Baltos Lankos and also went on to become a bestseller.

=== Silva Rerum translations ===
==== Reception in Latvia ====
The Latvian translation of 'Silva Rerum' was published in 2010 to rave reviews, comparing it to the work on the level of Salman Rushdie and Umberto Eco. In 2014 the translations by Dace Meiere of 'Silva Rerum' and Silva Rerum II (published in Latvia by Zvaigzne ABC) were voted by Latvian readers for inclusion in a list of 100 of Latvia's Most Favourite Books of All Times (the only book by a Lithuanian author in the list). Peter's Empress (Pētera Imperatore, Part I, 2020) has become the first Lithuanian book to reach number one on the bestselling lists.

==== Reception in Poland ====
In 2015 the Polish translation of 'Silva Rerum' by Izabela Korybut-Daszkiewicz was published in Poland and received exceptional reviews, with Olga Tokarczuk describing it as 'a splendidly written, marquesian novel which takes place in seventeenth century Lithuania and eventually reminds us that the history of Central Europe is our shared narrative' and critics calling it 'a novel which restores faith in literature', 'a true literary sensation from Lithuania (Mariusz Cieślik, Wprost), 'a truly monumental text, literature of the highest standard, a universal novel about humanity' (Tomasz Orwid, Dobre Książki). It was the first Lithuanian novel to receive such visibility and critical acclaim in Poland and to be shortlisted for the prestigious ANGELUS Central European Literary Prize in 2016 among 7 finalists.

The second part 'Silva Rerum II' (translated by Izabela Korybut-Daszkiewicz) was published in 2018 to even bigger critical acclaim and with the introduction blurb of Olga Tokarczuk stating that 'Kristina Sabaliauskaitė belongs among the most powerful and expressive voices of the historical novel in Europe'. The critics noted that the sequel is even more impressive than the debut novel, noting that 'here we encounter the literature which transgresses the conventional boundaries and speaks about the essential, fundamental cultural experiences', 'Sabaliauskaite has created a refined historical novel in a form that encapsulates the epoch. But first and foremost it is the exquisitely told, realistic and captivating human stories', emphasizing even greater mastery of the storytelling and the use of language: 'A breathtaking historical novel. [...] A spiritual feast for the reader. Nowadays a rare author uses such colourful, artistic and noble language'.

=== Literary Awards ===
- 2008 Jurga Ivanauskaitė literary award for the novel 'Silva Rerum'
- 2009 'Silva Rerum' voted Book of the Year in Lithuania
- 2011 'Silva Rerum II' voted Book of the Year in Lithuania
- 2015 Liudas Dovydėnas Literary Prize for the novel 'Silva Rerum III'
- 2016 the Polish edition of 'Silva Rerum' (2008) shortlisted for the final of Angelus Central European Literary Prize
- 2017 'Silva Rerum IV' (2016) voted the Best Fiction Book of the Year by 15min.lt readers
- 2018 'Silva Rerum' tetralogy (2008-2016) was voted 3rd in the '100 Lithuanian Books of the Centenary' list by the readers. The voting for the favourite Lithuanian literature classics was organized to commemorate the Centenary of Reinstating the Lithuanian Independence (1918-2018)
- 2019 'Peter's Empress' (part 1) elected Best Lithuanian Fiction Book of the Year 2019 by 15min.lt
- 2022 'Peter's Empress (part 2) Book of the Year 2022 in Estonia, category: Foreign Fiction, translated by Tiina Katel

=== Other awards ===
- 2011 Saint Christopher award from Vilnius Municipality for reflections of Vilnius in literature.
- 2015 Kristina Sabaliauskaitė named Woman of the Year in Lithuania
- 2017 awarded the Medal of the Order for Merits to Lithuania for the merits to literature, culture and society
- 2020 Doctor Honoris Causa of Vilnius Academy of Fine Arts (Lithuania)
- 2021 Award of Two Nations from the Parliament of Poland and Parliament of Lithuania for the contribution to the cultural and political collaboration between Poland and Lithuania
- 2023 named the Honorary Citizen of Vilnius
- 2023 received The Global Lithuanian award for Global recognition in literature and significant social initiatives
- 2024 awarded polish the Golden Cross of Merit for her contribution to the development of Polish-Lithuanian scientific and academic cooperation)

==== Lithuanian first editions ====
- Silva Rerum, a novel, Vilnius, Baltos Lankos, 2008.
- Silva Rerum II, a novel, Vilnius, Baltos Lankos, 2011.
- Danielius Dalba & kitos istorijos, collection of short stories, Vilnius, Baltos Lankos, 2012.
- Silva Rerum III, a novel, Vilnius, Baltos Lankos, 2014.
- Silva Rerum IV, a novel, Vilnius, Baltos Lankos, 2016.
- Petro imperatorė, (Part 1), a novel, Vilnius, Baltos Lankos, 2019.
- Petro imperatorė, (Part 2), a novel, Vilnius, Baltos Lankos, 2021.

==== Translations ====
===== French =====
- L'Imperatrice de Pierre, I, Paris, Editions La Table Ronde, 2023, translated by Marielle Vitureau
- L'Imperatrice de Pierre, II, Paris, Editions La Table Ronde, 2023, translated by Marielle Vitureau in collaboration with the author
- L'Imperatrice de Pierre, I, Paris, Gallimard Folio, 2024, translated by Marielle Vitureau
- L'Imperatrice de Pierre, II, Paris, Gallimard Folio, 2025, translated by Marielle Vitureau in collaboration with the author

===== Latvian =====
- Silva Rerum, Riga, Apgads Zvaigzne ABC, 2010, translated by Dace Meiere
- Silva Rerum II, Riga, Apgads Zvaigzne ABC, 2012, translated by Dace Meiere
- Silva Rerum III, Riga, Apgads Zvaigzne ABC, 2015, translated by Dace Meiere
- Silva Rerum IV, Riga, Apgads Zvaigzne ABC, 2018, translated by Dace Meiere
- Pētera imperatore (I), Riga, Apgads Zvaigzne ABC, 2020, translated by Dace Meiere
- Pētera imperatore (II), Riga, Apgads Zvaigzne ABC, 2022, translated by Dace Meiere

===== Polish =====
- Silva Rerum, Kraków, Znak, 2015, translated by Izabela Korybut-Daszkiewicz
- Silva Rerum, Kraków, Wydawnictwo Literackie, 2019, translated by Izabela Korybut-Daszkiewicz
- Silva Rerum II, Kraków, Wydawnictwo Literackie, 2018, translated by Izabela Korybut-Daszkiewicz
- Silva Rerum III, Kraków, Wydawnictwo Literackie, 2021, translated by Kamil Pecela
- Silva Rerum IV, Kraków, Wydawnictwo Literackie, 2021, translated by Kamil Pecela
- Cesarzowa Piotra (I), Kraków, Wydawnictwo Literackie, 2021, translated by Eliza Deszczyńska

===== English =====
- Vilnius. Wilno. Vilna. Three Short Stories, Vilnius, Baltos Lankos, 2015, translated by Romas Kinka

===== Estonian =====
- Peetri keisrinna (I), Tallinn, Varrak, 2021, translated by Tiina Katel
- Peetri keisrinna (II), Tallinn, Varrak, 2021, translated by Tiina Katel
- Silva Rerum (I), Tallinn, Varrak, 2025, translated by Tiina Katel

===== Dutch =====
- Peters keizerin, Amsterdam, Prometheus, 2021, translated by Anita van der Molen
- Peters keizerin II, Amsterdam, Prometheus, 2023, translated by Anita van der Molen

===== Slovenian =====
- Petrova imperatorica, I, Založba Goga, 2021, translated by Klemen Pisk
- Petrova imperatorica, II, Zalożba Goga, 2023, translated by Klemen Pisk

===== Belarusian =====
- Silva Rerum I, Praha, Vesna, 2025, translated by Siarhej Shupa
- Silva Rerum II, Praha, Vesna, 2025, translated by Siarhej Shupa
- Silva Rerum III, Praha, Vesna, 2026, translated by Siarhej Shupa
- Silva Rerum IV, Praha, Vesna, 2026, translated by Siarhej Shupa

== Musical collaboration ==
In 2022–2023 Kristina Sabaliauskaitė collaborated with internationally acclaimed Lithuanian composer and conductor Gediminas Gelgotas creating the lyrics for his symphony "The Sarabande Of Vilnius" which premiered on 10 March 2023 in Vilnius at Lithuanian National Philharmonic. "The Sarabande of Vilnius", commissioned to commemorate the 700th anniversary of Vilnius'mention in historical sources, was conducted by Gelgotas and performed by Lithuanian National Symphony Orchestra and the choir Jauna Muzika.
