= Raisa Kyrychenko =

Ukrainian singer (1943–2005)

Hero of Ukraine Merited Artist Raisa Kyrychenko
- Раїса Кириченко
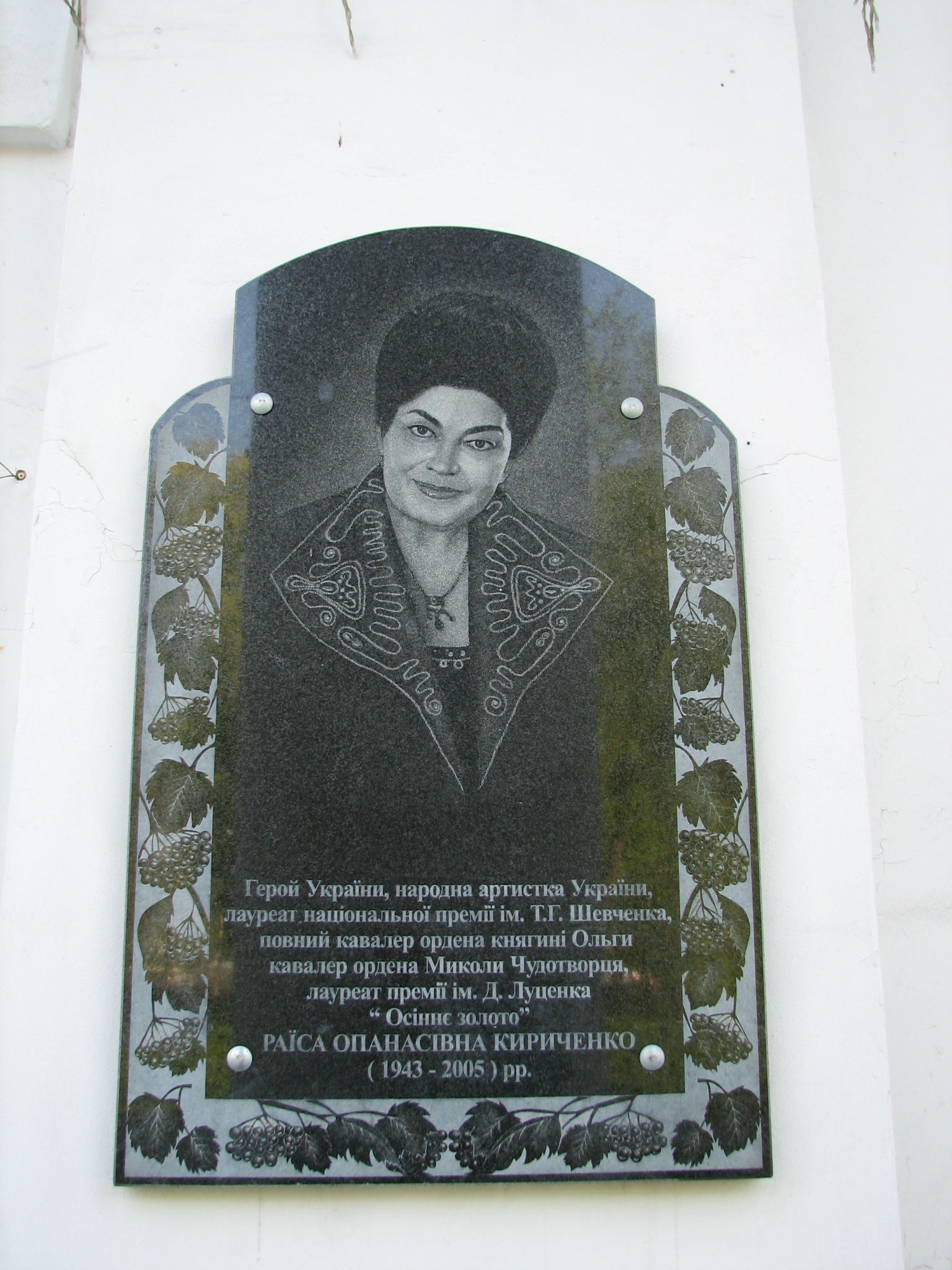
- Commemorative plaque of Raisa
- Born: 14 October 1943; Koreshchyna, Ukrainian SSR, Soviet Union
- Died: 9 February 2005 (aged 61); Kyiv, Ukraine
- Education: Kharkiv National Kotlyarevsky University of Arts
- Occupations: Singer; music teacher
- Spouse: Mykola Kyrychenko
- Awards: Hero of Ukraine
- Musical career
- Genres: Folk; pop
- Instrument: Vocals

Raisa Opanasivna Kyrychenko (née Korzh; Ukrainian: Раїса Опанасівна Кириченко; 14 October 1943 – 9 February 2005) was a Ukrainian mezzo-soprano singer and music teacher who is a recipient of the Hero of Ukraine and Order of Princess Olga. The singer's vast repertory included compositions by modern artists as well as traditional songs from Belarus, Russia, and Ukraine.

== Early life and education ==
Born on 14 October 1943, in the Ukrainian village of Koreshchyna. Conflicting sources stated her birthday on 14 November. Raisa participated actively in the community and received her first singing lesson at the Zemlyankiv school. Although she was employed in a communal farm, she continued to sing in a chorus that she and other girls had founded. She sang as a soloist in the school choir when she studied in middle school. She later graduated frorm the Kharkiv National Kotlyarevsky University of Arts in the late 1980s.

== Career ==
The Kremenchuk Automobile Plant's house of culture's district choir leader, Pavlo Ochenash, brought notice to her distinctive voice. He was the one who assisted the young Raisa in obtaining the approval of the authorities of the communal farms to relocate to the city and join the choir.

She spent her 19 years in Cherkasy, right on the brink of her eventual heyday in Poltava. She started having asthma attacks after the construction of the Azot chemical plant, which had a negative impact on her career. Fedir Morgun, the first secretary of the Poltava Oblast Council at the time, fell in love with her profession, and doctors recommended her to leave the city. To bring her back home, he dispatched his colleagues Herman Yurchenko and Hryhoriy Levchenko. A new chapter in her artistic life as well as the life of Poltava the artist opened.

Raisa joined the Poltava Philharmonic's Raiselka group in 1962. She came to Zhytomyr and started singing with the ensemble Lyonok in 1964 after receiving an invitation from its leader. She sang solos with the Kherson Philharmonic at that time. She joined the Cherkasy Folk Choir in 1968. Although a folk group Rosava was made for her in Cherkasy in 1983, she returned to Poltava in 1987 due to disagreements with the Philharmonic leadership. She then joined the Churaivna group there.

Hleb Kudryashov, her biographer, further claims that not many people are aware that Raisa donated her Shevchenko National Prize to the Chernobyl charity. It so happened that in April of 1986, following her receipt of this prize in March, the Chernobyl disaster occurred. She gave a sizable donation as she was unable to turn away from the incident.

Other hits follow the song I'm your Cossack in Poltava. In Ukraine, Raisa achieves a significant achievement in media. She left the traditional folk tunes behind and made her way onto the main stage. The lyrics to the Mr. Colonel, nevertheless, sparked controversy since it used the term "Mr. Colonel" rather than "comrade." Years later, the address "Mr. Colonel" was to become customary for the Ukrainian Ground Forces, even if not everybody appreciated it at that point.

After Mr. Colonel became popular, she began to release an increasing number of pop successes. The vocalist performs at the Freestyle band's studio. The Cherry Bloomss and The Fate of My Village are the two CDs that Raisa has released. She has been employed as a vocal instructor at the Poltava Mykola Lysenko College of Arts in 1994.

Following her Canadian tour in 1995, Raisa started experiencing renal issues. Funds were raised by Ukrainians for the procedure, which involved her flying to Germany in November 1996 to get treatment and be ready for a surgery in Kyiv. The singer had a transplant of her kidneys in Kyiv on 2 June 1998. Her life was prolonged by this procedure by eight years. She performed overseas, notably in the United States. Baltimore, an American city, has made her an honorary citizen in 1983. Other countries she toured included Germany, Bulgaria, Poland, Algeria, India, Tunisia, Malaysia, the Philippines.

From September 1999 until October 2001, Raisa served on the committee for the Shevchenko National Prize. She had her coronary arteries operated on at the National Institute of Surgery and Transplantology on 1 February 2005. The damage was caused by the operation she was receiving for renal treatment. But the surgery was ineffective and she died from cardiac illness on 9 February 2005. As directed by Raisa, she was buried close to her mother's tomb in the village of Koreshchyna, in the Poltava Oblast.

== Personal life ==
Raisa met her future husband, Mykola Kyrychenko, an accordionist, composer, and arranger, in Poltava. The husband outlived her by 8 years during their 43-year happily ever after. In 2000, she relocated her residence to Kyiv.

== Awards and recognitions ==
In honor of Raisa, a memorial plaque was inaugurated at her parents' home on 13 October 2005, and a church was constructed in the village of Koreshchyna. The home at 40 Sichovykh Striltsiv Street in Kyiv, where she resided from 1997 to 2005, has a memorial plaque placed on its exterior. In Cherkasy, a bust was built in 2018 close to the Regional Philharmonic building. In addition to the sculpture of her placed on Raisa Kyrychenko Street outside the Public Poltava administration building on 13 October 2012, a memorial plaque was also placed on the home where she resided in Poltava on 13 October 2005. The Raisa Kyrychenko Museum in Poltava, which is housed within the Poltava V.G. Korolenko National Pedagogical University, preserves her legacy. The singer's records, outfit, shoes, and old pictures are all shown on different cassettes in the museum.

Raisa has received awards and recognitions such as:

- Hero of Ukraine Order of the State (31 October 2003)
- Order of Princess Olga First Class (3 March 2001)
- Order of Princess Olga Second Class (4 March 1999)
- Order of Princess Olga Third Class (3 March 1998)
- Shevchenko National Prize (1986)
- People's Artist of the Ukrainian SSR (1979)
- Honored Artist of the Ukrainian SSR (1973)
- Honorary Citizen of Baltimore (1983)

== Gallery ==
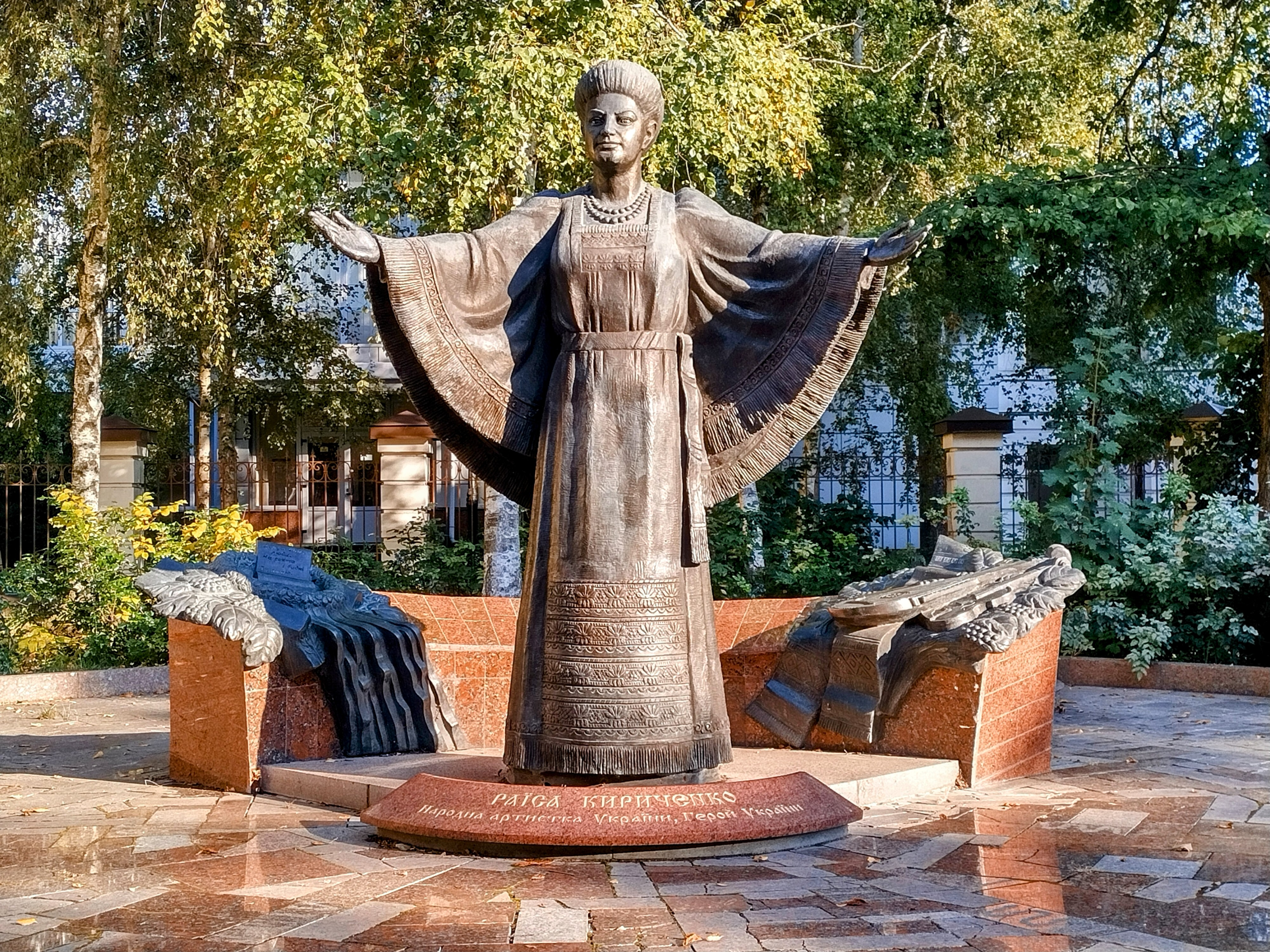
Monument at Raisa Kyrychenko Street in Poltava

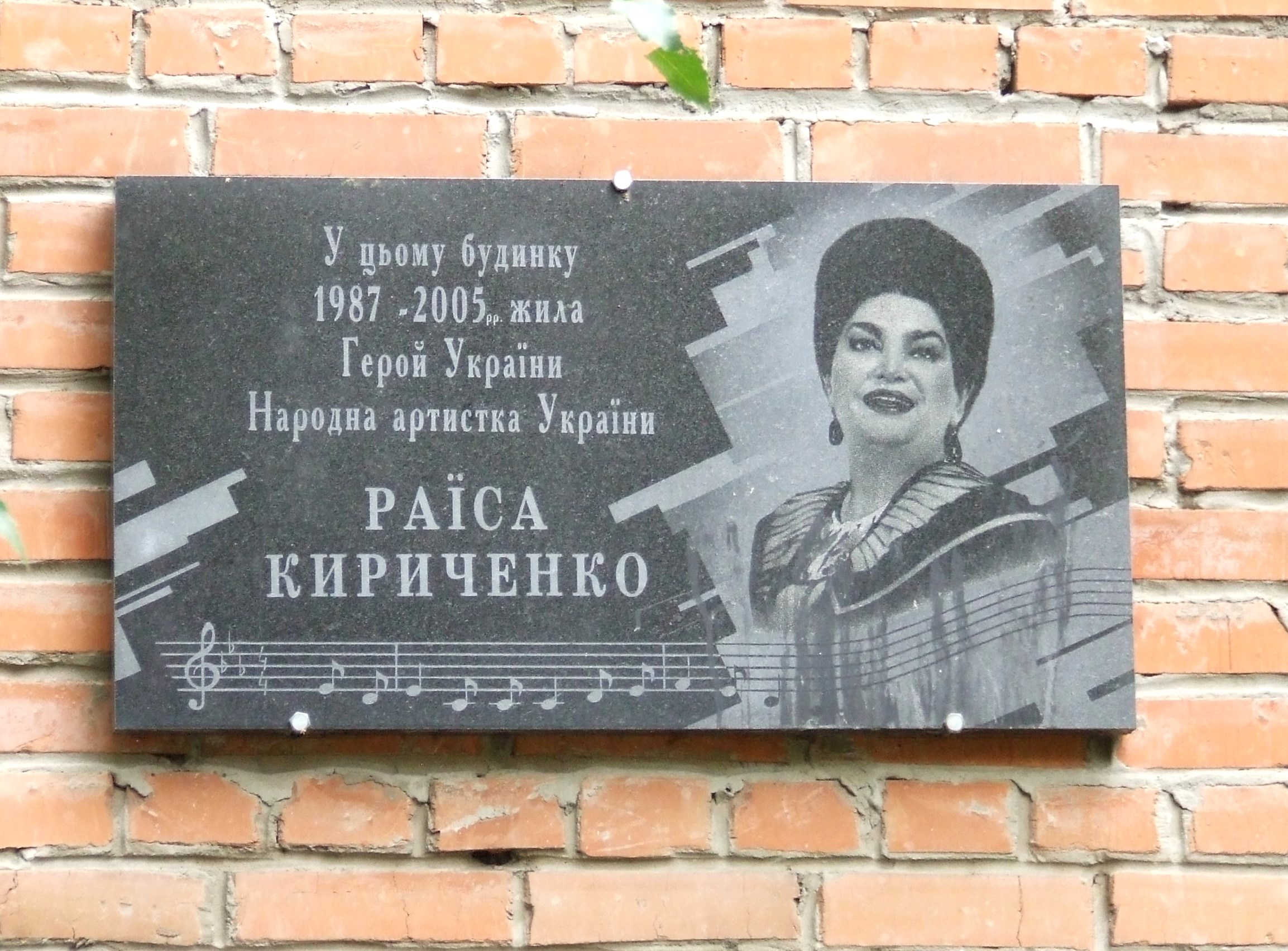
Memorial plaque outside her Poltava home

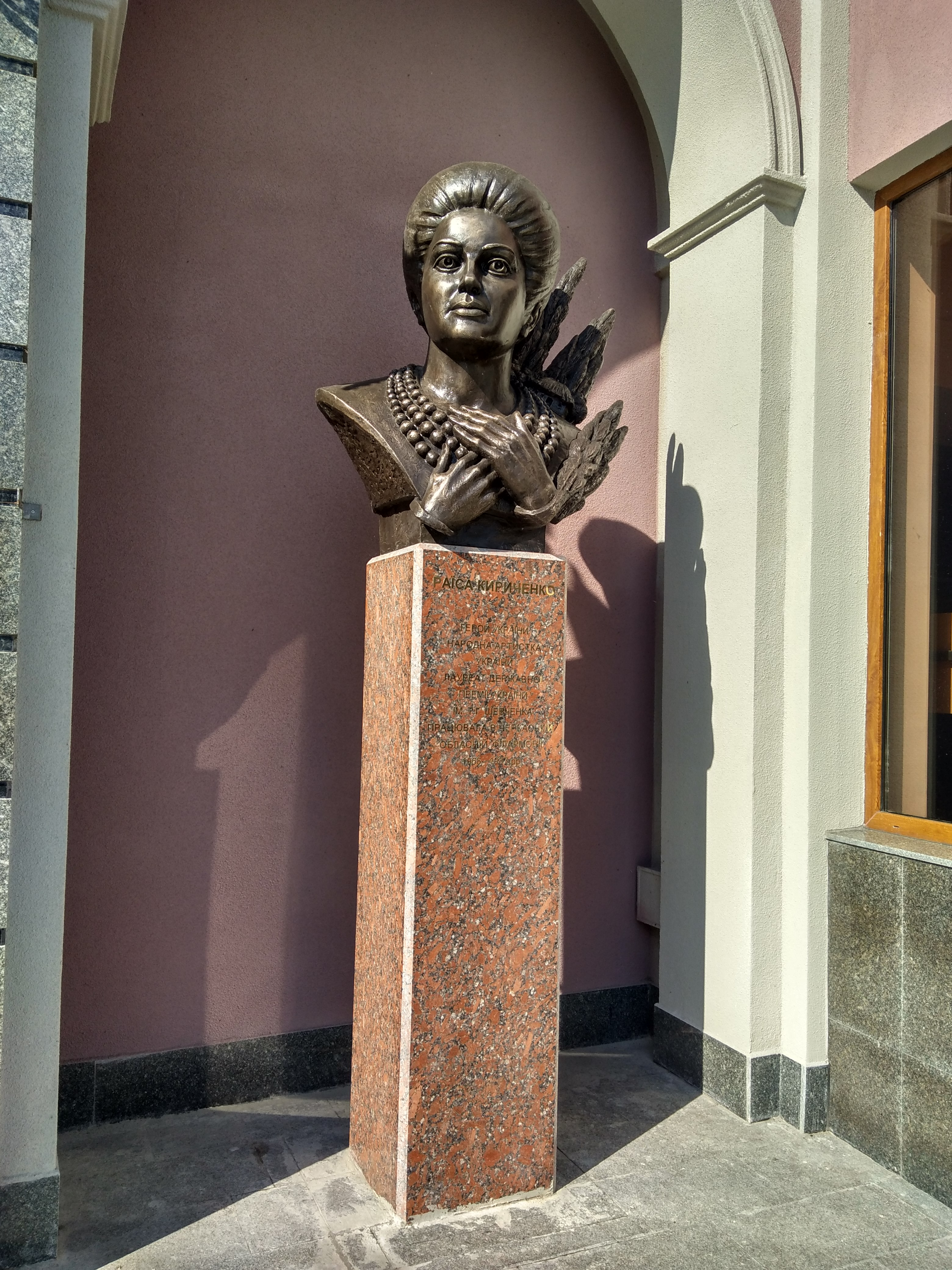
Bust outside the Cherkasy Regional Philharmonic

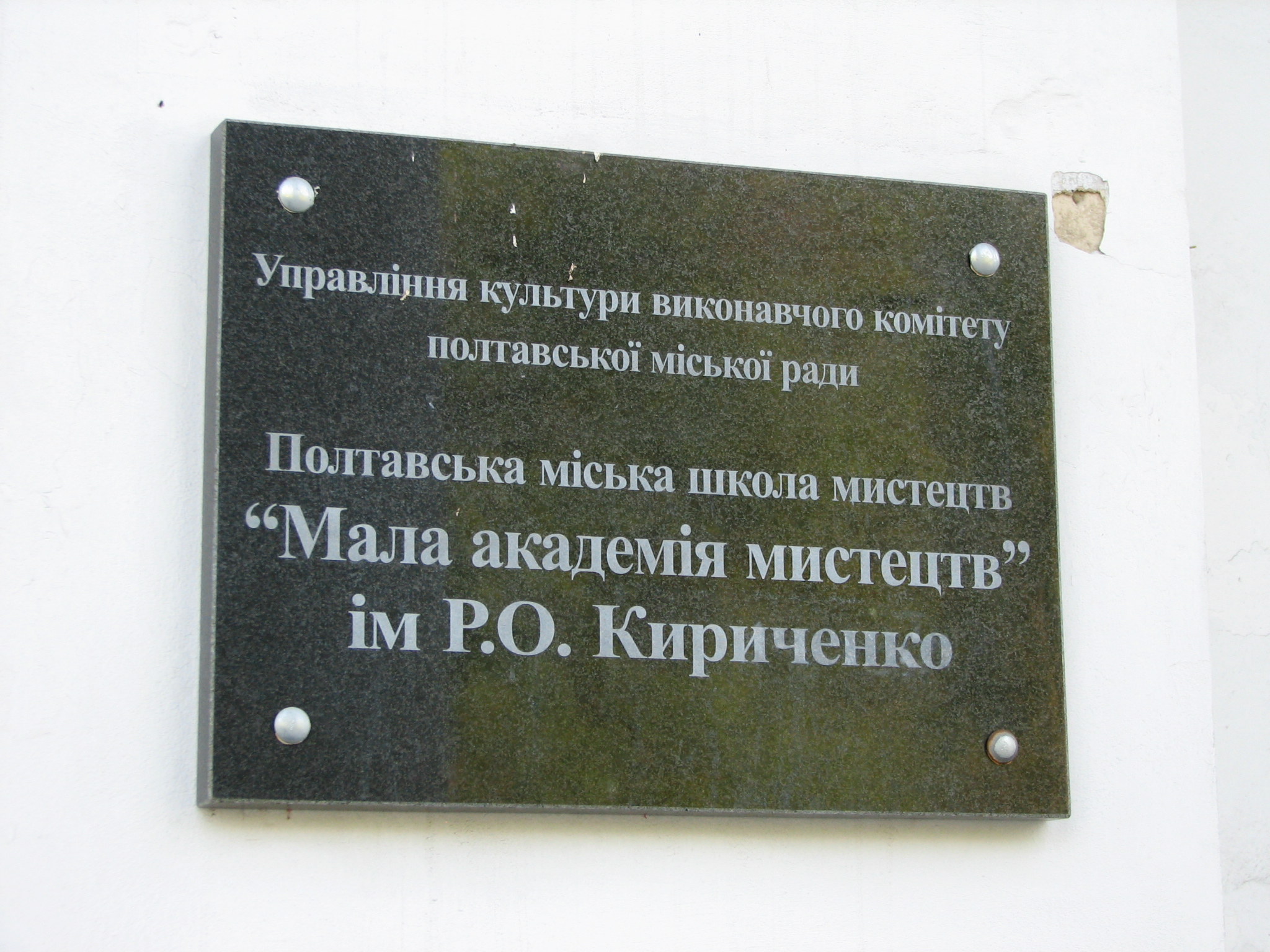
Memorial plaque at 35 Sobornosti Street in Poltava
