= List of honorary citizens of Tel Aviv =

People awarded the Honorary citizenship of the City of Tel Aviv, Israel are:

== Honorary Citizens of Tel Aviv ==
Listed by year of award:

Date	Name	Notes
13 February 1923	Albert Einstein (1879–1955)	American Theoretical Physicist.
26 March 1925	Arthur Balfour (1848–1930)	Prime Minister of the United Kingdom.
31 December 1934	Chaim Weizmann (1874–1952)	President of Israel 1949–1952.
7 March 1935	Tomáš Masaryk (1850–1937)	President of Czechoslovakia 1918–1935.
29 December 1936	Yehudah Grazowski (1862–1950)	Jewish lexicographer.
12 March 1940	Max Bodenheimer (1865–1940)	Jewish lawyer.
2023	Isaac Herzog (born 1960)	President of Israel.
