= List of honorary citizens of Split =

Among the recipients of the honorary citizenship of the City of Split, Croatia are:

== Honorary Citizens of City of Split ==
Date	Name	Notes	Location
1924	Phillip Andrews	United States Navy Admiral	
26 October 1945	Josip Broz Tito	marshal of Yugoslavia	extraordinary session of the National Board of City of Split
30 September 1958	Einara Gerhardsen	prime minister of Norway	formal session of the National Board of City of Split
20 October 1967	Per Borten	prime minister of Norway	formal session of Parliament of the Municipality of Split
30 September 1969	Grga Novak	chairman of Yugoslav Academy of Sciences and Arts	formal session of Parliament of the Municipality of Split
27 July 1970	Vladimir Bakarić	member of presidency of League of Communists of Yugoslavia	session on the occasion of the 25th anniversary of the first Croatian National Government
26 October 1979	Stane Dolanc	chairman of the Committee for the VIII Mediterranean Games - Split 1979	formal session of Parliament of the Municipality of Split
29 October 1992 or 1993	Helmut Kohl	German chancellor. Award handed on 15 January 1993	25th joint session of the Council of associated labor, Council of local communities, and the Socially political council
6 October 1995	Franjo Tuđman	President of Croatia. Award handed on 8 October 1995	32nd session of the City Council
17 July 1998	Alois Mock	Austrian minister of foreign affairs	14th session of the City Council
17 July 1998	Franjo Komarica	archbishop of Banja Luka	14th session of the City Council
23 November 2012	Ante Gotovina	general of the Croatian Army	38th session of the City Council
