= List of honorary citizens of Sarajevo =

Coat of arms of Sarajevo

People awarded the Honorary citizenship of the City of Sarajevo, Bosnia and Herzegovina are:

== Honorary Citizens of Sarajevo ==
Listed by date of award:

Date	Name	Notes
8 April 2006	Luciano Pavarotti (1935–2007)	Italian operatic tenor.
1 February 2011	Jacques Chirac (1932–2019)	President of France 1995–2007.
8 July 2012	Angelina Jolie (1975–Present)	American actress.
30 April 2014	Michael Schumacher (1969–Present)	German racing driver.
6 April 2019	Bruce Dickinson (1958–Present)	English musician.
