= List of honorary citizens of Chechnya =

People awarded the Honorary citizenship of the Republic of Chechnya are:

== Honorary Citizens of Chechnya ==
Listed by date of award:

Date	Name	Notes
23 June 2018	Mohamed Salah (15 June 1992–)	Liverpool and Egypt Footballer.
