= List of honorary citizens of Vilnius =

The honorary citizenship of the city of Vilnius, Lithuania has been awarded to 22 people since Lithuania regained independence in 1990.

== Honorary citizens of Vilnius ==
#	Date awarded	Name	Occupation	Awarded for
1	27 February 1996	Ronald Reagan (1911–2004)	Former President of the United States	For his contribution to the dissolution of the Soviet Union and his support of the independence of the Baltic states. For example, he proclaimed the Baltic Freedom Day in 1982.
2	27 February 1996	Jón Baldvin Hannibalsson (1939–)	Former Minister for Foreign Affairs of Iceland	For his support of the independence of the Baltic states. Iceland became the first country to recognize Lithuania's independence on 12 February 1991.
3	11 February 2000	Kazimieras Vasiliauskas (1922–2001)	Lithuanian Roman Catholic priest, monsignor	For moral authority and guidance to Lithuanian Catholics. He was the first parson of Vilnius Cathedral when it was returned to the congregation in 1989.
4	26 July 2000	Mstislav Rostropovich (1927–2007)	Soviet and Russian cellist and conductor	For his support of the independence of Lithuania. He toured Spain with the Lithuanian Chamber Orchestra right after the January Events in Vilnius and promoted the cause of Lithuania's independence in the Spanish press.
5	14 March 2001	Dennis Hastert (1942–)	Former Speaker of the United States House of Representatives	For his support of Lithuania's membership in NATO
6	25 July 2001	Czesław Miłosz (1911–2004)	Polish-American poet, winner of the 1980 Nobel Prize in Literature	For his support of the independence of Lithuania. He co-published short piece Poets for Lithuania in The New York Times on 15 January 1991.
7	20 November 2002	Justinas Marcinkevičius (1930–2011)	Lithuanian poet and playwright	For his literary works
8	15 October 2003	Zbigniew Brzezinski (1928–2017)	Former United States National Security Advisor	For his support of the independence of Lithuania and membership in NATO
9	26 April 2006	Jonas Kubilius (1921–2011)	Professor, former rector of Vilnius University	For his scientific work and leadership of the university for almost 33 years
10	6 June 2012	Algirdas Kaušpėdas (1953–)	Lithuanian architect, founder of rock band Antis	For his work towards the independence of Lithuania
11	3 April 2013	Tomas Venclova (1937–)	Lithuanian poet	For publication of three books about Vilnius (a guide book in 2001, a biographical dictionary of famous Vilnians in 2006, and a history book through personal experiences in 2011)
12	8 July 2013	Shimon Peres (1923–2016)	Former President of Israel and winner of the 1994 Nobel Peace Prize.	For his efforts in fostering the Israel–Lithuania relations
13	21 April 2015	Algirdas Brazauskas (1932–2010)	Former President and Prime Minister of Lithuania	For the reconstruction of the Palace of the Grand Dukes of Lithuania
14	3 February 2016	Algimantas Nasvytis (1928–2018)	Lithuanian architect.	For his architectural work in the city
15	28 April 2017	Samuel Bak (1933–)	American painter	For his artistic works. He gifted 125 paintings to Vilnius, where he lived until the end of World War II
16	30 August 2018	George W. Bush (1946–)	Former President of the United States	For his visit to Vilnius on 22 November 2002 right after the 2002 Prague summit and his support for the enlargement of NATO
17–18	9 January 2019	Viktoras Butkus (1954–) and Danguolė Butkienė	Chemist, founder of the biotechnology company Fermentas	For founding the MO Museum
19	22 January 2020	Julius Sasnauskas (1959–)	Roman Catholic priest, anti-Soviet dissident	For his books and articles about Vilnius
20	17 February 2021	Vytautas Landsbergis (1932–)	Lithuanian politician, leader of pro-independence Sąjūdis	For his work towards the independence of Lithuania
21	2 February 2022	Valdas Adamkus (1926–)	Former President of Lithuania	For his impact on integration into the European Union and NATO
22	22 February 2023	Kristina Sabaliauskaitė (1974–)	Lithuanian author	For her literary works about 16th-18th century Vilnius
