= List of honorary citizens of Sofia =

People awarded the Honorary citizenship of the City of Sofia, Bulgaria are:

== Honorary Citizens of Sofia ==
Listed by date of award:

Date	Name	Notes
7 November 2001	Stefan Sofiyanski (7 November 1951–)	Bulgarian Politician.
2010	Magdalina Stancheva (7 September 1924–6 October 2014)	Bulgarian Archaeologist.
28 March 2014	Sylvie Vartan (15 August 1944–)	Bulgarian Singer and Actress.
12 January 2015	Irina Bokova (12 July 1952–)	Bulgarian Politician and Director General of UNESCO.
