= List of honorary citizens of Bathurst =

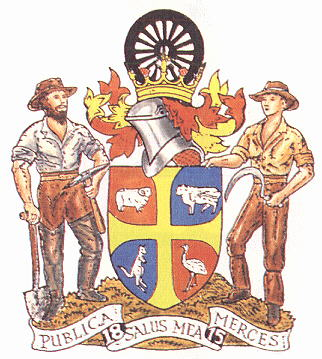

People awarded the Honorary citizenship of the City of Bathurst, Australia are:

== Honorary Citizens of Bathurst ==
Listed by date of award:

Date	Name	Notes
29 September 1979	John Reid AO	
29 September 1979	George Hibbert	
26 June 1981	John Hinxman	
7 July 1981	Peter Brock AM (1945–2006)	Australian Racing Driver.
3 October 1981	Allan Moffat OBE (1939–Present)	Australian Racing Driver.
6 October 1981	Dr. Lloyd Rees AC CMG (1895–1988)	Australian Artist.
8 April 1982	Harry Bartrop	
21 November 1983	William Bowmore OBE	
18 March 1985	Rt. Hon. Earl of Bathurst DL (1927–2011)	UK Conservative Politician.
4 April 1985	Arthur B Blizzard	
30 August 1993	James C Kelso	
4 May 1998	Prof C.D. Blake AM	
16 July 2014	Mr. Donald & Mrs. Colleen Liddle	
20 August 2014	Mr. Sonny Sonobe	
16 March 2016	John Franklyn Mars KBE (1935–Present)	American Businessman
16 March 2016	Adrienne Mars	American Businesswoman
26 July 2017	Prof Warren Somerville AM	
19 September 2018	Craig Lowndes OAM (1974–Present)	Australian Racing Driver
