= List of honorary citizens of Baltimore =

People awarded the Honorary citizenship of the City of Baltimore, Maryland, United States are:

== Honorary citizens of Baltimore ==
Listed by date of award:

Date	Name	Country	Notes
May 30, 1973	Pelé (1940-2022)	Brazil	footballer
1983	Raisa Kyrychenko (1943-2005)	Ukraine	singer
March 22, 1990	Maya Angelou (1928-2014)	United States	Poet and Civil Rights Activist.
June 29, 2011	Gilad Shalit (born 1986)	Israel	IDF Soldier
