= List of Freemen of the City of Manchester =

The following people and military units have received the Freedom of the City of Manchester.

== Individuals ==
- Oliver Heywood: 1888.
- Sir Henry Morton Stanley: 1890.
- Abel Heywood: 1891.
- Thomas Ashton, 1st Baron Ashton of Hyde: 1892.
- James Jardine: 1892.
- Professor Sir Adolphus Ward: 1897.
- Herbert Philips: 1897.
- Enriqueta Augustina Rylands: 1899.
- Robert Dukinfield Darbishire: 1899.
- Richard Copley Christie: 1899.
- Sir William Crossley: 1903.
- Harry Rawson: 1903.
- Sir William Houldsworth: 1905.
- Benn Wolfe Levy: 1905.
- George Milner: 1905.
- James Wilson Southern: 1906.
- Sir Wilfrid Laurier: 1907.
- Alfred Deakin: 1907.
- Sir Joseph Ward: 1907.
- Sir Leander Starr Jameson: 1907.
- Sir Robert Bond: 1907.
- Sir Frederick Moor: 1907.
- Louis Botha: 1907.
- Sir Thomas Vansittart Bowater: 1914.
- William Morris Hughes: 1916.
- Sir Edward Holt: 1916.
- Sir Edward Donner: 1916.
- General Maharaja Sir Ganga Singh Bahadur: 1917.
- Sir James Meston: 1917.
- Satyendra Prasanna Sinha, 1st Baron Sinha: 1917.
- Sir Robert Borden: 1917.
- William Massey: 1917.
- Field Marshal Jan Smuts: 1917.
- Edward Morris, 1st Baron Morris: 1917.
- David Lloyd George: 1918.
- President Woodrow Wilson: 1918.
- Admiral of the Fleet Sir David Beatty: 1919.
- Field Marshal Sir Douglas Haig: 1919.
- Field Marshal Ferdinand Foch: 1923.
- William Lyon Mackenzie King: 1926.
- Lord Bruce of Melbourne: 1926.
- Gordon Coates: 1926.
- General J. B. M. Hertzog: 1926.
- W. T. Cosgrave: 1926.
- Walter Stanley Monroe: 1926.
- Maharajadhiraja Bahadur Sir Bijay Chand Mahtab: 1926.
- C. P. Scott: 1930.
- Edward Stanley, 17th Earl of Derby: 1934.
- Hermann Julius Goldschmidt: 1937.
- William Turner Jackson: 1937.
- Sir Winston Churchill: 1943.
- Field Marshal Sir Bernard Montgomery: 1945.
- Marshal of the Royal Air Force Sir Arthur Tedder: 1945.
- Admiral of the Fleet Andrew Cunningham, 1st Viscount Cunningham of Hyndhope: 1945.
- Field Marshal Harold Alexander, 1st Earl Alexander of Tunis: 1945.
- Sir William Kay: 1949.
- Clement Attlee: 1953.
- Sir Miles Ewart Mitchell: 1954.
- Dame Mary Kingsmill Jones: 1956.
- Wright Robinson: 1956
- Professor Sir John Stopford: 1956.
- Sir John Barbirolli: 1958.
- Ernest Simon, 1st Baron Simon of Wythenshawe: 1959.
- Edward Stanley, 18th Earl of Derby: 1961.
- Lady Simon of Wythenshawe: 1964.
- Sir Matthew Busby: 1967.
- Thomas Francis Regan: 1973.
- Sir Richard Harper: 1973.
- Sir Robert Thomas: 1973.
- Dame Elizabeth Yarwood: 1974.
- Nellie Beer: 1974.
- Professor Sir Bernard Lovell: 1977.
- Dame Kathleen Ollerenshaw: 1984.
- The Very Reverend Alfred Jowett: 1984.
- Sir Alexander Ferguson: 1999.
- Anthony Wilson: 2007.
- Sir Robert Charlton: 2008.
- Professor Sir Andre Geim: 9 October 2013.
- Professor Sir Konstantin Novoselov: 9 October 2013.

== Military units ==
- The Manchester Regiment: 1946.
- 613 (City of Manchester) Squadron, RAuxAF: 1957.
- The King's Regiment: 1962.
- The Grenadier Guards: 1964.
- HMS Manchester, RN: 1998.
- The Duke of Lancaster's Regiment: 6 December 2006.
- 207 (Manchester) Field Hospital (Volunteers): 2 February 2011

- 209 (The Manchester Artillery) Battery 103rd (Lancashire Artillery Volunteers) Regiment Royal Artillery: 25 November 2020.

== Honorary citizens ==
On 12 July 2017, American singer Ariana Grande became the first honorary citizen of Manchester, after a unanimous vote by the Manchester City Council.
