= List of honorary citizens of Valletta =

People awarded the honorary citizenship of the city of Valletta, Malta are:

== Honorary citizens of Valletta ==
Listed by date of award:

Date	Name	Notes
November 2002	Dimitris Avramopoulos (1953–present)	Mayor of Athens 1995–2002.
April 2004	Ugo Attardi (1923–2006)	Italian painter, sculptor and writer.
April 2004	Carlo Ciccalrelli	Curator of the Galleria d'Arte Ulisse.
April 2004	Alessandro Masi	Secretary general of the Dante Alighieri Society.
October 2006	Riccardo Muti (1941–present)	Italian conducting.
28 March 2008	Gabriel Caruana (1929–2018)	Italian artist.
28 March 2008	Vicente Burgos	
June 2008	Enrique Iglesias (1975–present)	American singer.
