= List of honorary citizens of Afghanistan =

People awarded the Honorary citizenship of Afghanistan are:

== Honorary Citizens of Afghanistan ==
Listed by date of award:

| Date | Name | Notes |
|---|---|---|
| 7 October 2019 | Tetsu Nakamura (1946-2019) | Japanese physician |
| 21 July 2019 | Alberto Cairo (1952–) | Italian physiotherapist |
