= List of honorary citizens of Moscow =

People awarded the Honorary citizenship of the City of Moscow, Russia are:

== Honorary Citizens of Moscow ==
Listed by date of award:

Date	Name	Notes
12 May 1916	Rt. Hon. Sir George Buchanan (25 November 1854–20 December 1924)	British Ambassador to Russia 1910–1917.
8 May 1917	Albert Thomas (16 June 1878–7 May 1932)	French Politician and Diplomat.
13 September 2000	Patriarch Alexy II of Moscow (23 February 1929–5 December 2008)	Primate of the Russian Orthodox Church 1990–2008.
