= Listed pubs in Greater Manchester =

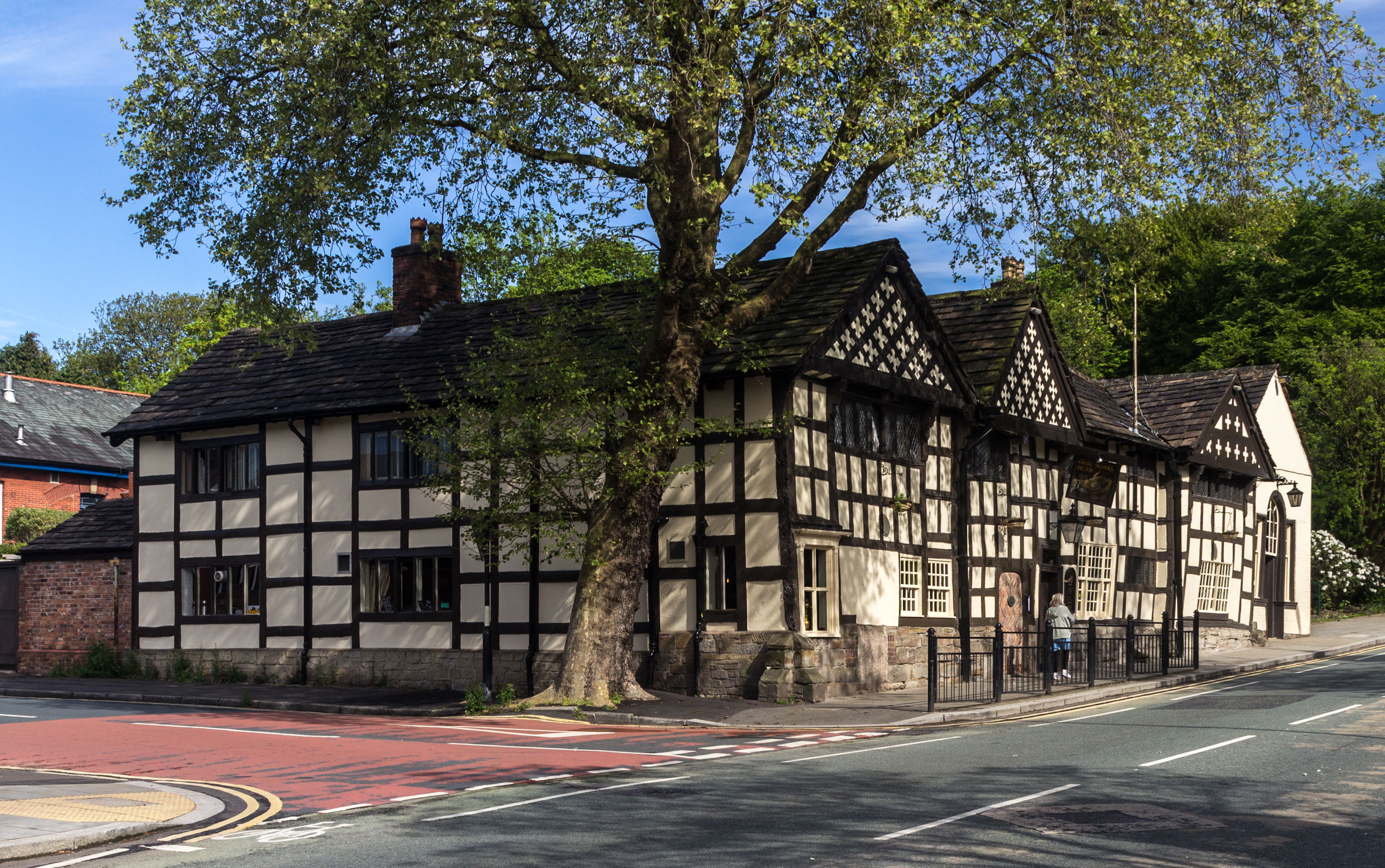
Ye Olde Boar's Head, the oldest surviving pub building in Greater Manchester, has a timber‑framed core dated to 1622

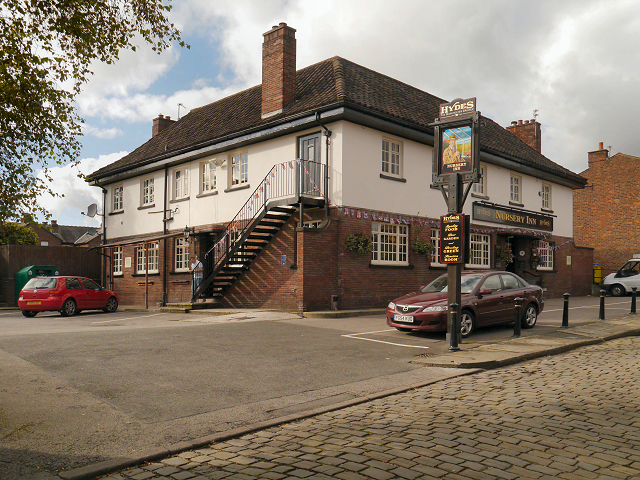
The Nursery Inn, the newest listed pub, was built in 1939

Location of Greater Manchester within England

Listed pubs in Greater Manchester are public houses within the metropolitan and ceremonial county of Greater Manchester in North West England that have been designated as listed buildings for their architectural or historic interest. Listing is carried out under the Planning (Listed Buildings and Conservation Areas) Act 1990 by the Secretary of State for Culture, Media and Sport, advised by Historic England.

Greater Manchester comprises 10 metropolitan boroughs: Bolton, Bury, Manchester, Oldham, Rochdale, Salford, Stockport, Tameside, Trafford, and Wigan. The county was created on 1 April 1974, incorporating areas formerly in Cheshire, Lancashire, and a small part of the West Riding of Yorkshire. Manchester contains 37 of the county's listed pubs, the highest number of any borough; Tameside has the fewest, with four.

The pubs range in date from a mid‑16th‑century structure later converted to licensed use to buildings of the interwar period, and include former houses, inns, hotels, a school, a cinema, and purpose‑built Victorian premises. Their official entries record features such as tiled façades, timber framing, and surviving interior elements, illustrating the mix of 19th and early 20th‑century architecture found across the county.

The list comprises 141 pubs, of which three are listed at Grade II*, the middle grade, and the remainder at Grade II, the lowest grade. Although all were designated for their architectural or historic interest as pubs, some have since closed or been converted to other uses. Together, they reflect the evolution of pub design, the growth of Greater Manchester's districts, and the changing social role of licensed premises. (Note: Architectural descriptions for multiple entries are primarily taken from Hartwell, Hyde, and Pevsner's Buildings of England volume Lancashire: Manchester and the South-East (0-300-10583-5), and from architectural historian Clare Hartwell's Pevsner Architectural Guide for Manchester (978-0-300-09666-8).)

== Key ==
Explanation of the listed building grades
Grade	Criteria
II*	Particularly important buildings of more than special interest
II	Buildings of special interest

== Bolton ==
Listed pubs in the Metropolitan Borough of Bolton
Name	Image	Location, postcode district	Constructed	Date designated	Grade	Entry number	Notes	Refs.
Olde Man & Scythe 53.5796°N 2.4263°W	Black-and-white timber-framed public house	Churchgate, Bolton, BL1	1636 (rebuilt)	26 April 1974	II	1387975	One of Bolton's oldest pubs, first recorded in a 1251 market charter and rebuilt in 1636, with only its vaulted cellar surviving from the original structure and "vestiges of timber framing". The Earl of Derby was executed outside in 1651, and a commemorative cross and plaque now mark the site; a chair associated with him is kept inside. The building is regarded by CAMRA as having an interior of "special national historic importance".	
Blundell Arms 53.5952°N 2.5061°W	Stone public house	Chorley Old Road, Horwich, BL6	17th and early 19th century	24 November 1966	II	1067323	Originated as a 17th‑century building with early 19th‑century alterations, and was recorded under various names in the 19th century, including Horwich Moor Gate on the 1894 Ordnance Survey map. By the late 20th century it was a Greenall Whitley house, and it is now part of the Chef & Brewer group owned by Greene King.	
King's Head 53.5682°N 2.4660°W	White-roughcast public house	Junction Road, Deane, BL3	Late 18th century	26 April 1974	II	1387968	An 18th‑century pub with mid‑19th‑century extensions, shown on the 1893 Ordnance Survey map as the King's Head Hotel and later recorded simply as a pub. It stands within the Deane village conservation area. By 2025 it was noted as the only remaining pub in Bolton with a bowling green still used for its original purpose.	
Churchills 53.5706°N 2.4209°W	Red-brick public house	Manchester Road, Great Lever, BL3	Early 19th century	26 April 1974	II	1388112	Originated as an early 19th‑century beerhouse, later appearing on the 1893 and 1947 Ordnance Survey maps as an unnamed pub. It was briefly noted in the Good Beer Guide before passing through several owners and names, including Rose Hill and Churchills. Closed since 2009, it has suffered repeated arson attacks and remains derelict as of 2026.	
White Lion 53.5486°N 2.5199°W	Rendered public house	Market Street, Westhoughton, BL5	Early 19th century	17 February 2016	II	1429216	It formerly also served as Westhoughton's post office and is an inter‑war "improved" pub retaining characteristic plan form and interior detail. A plaque installed in 2012 commemorates the bicentenary of the 1812 Luddite burning of Westhoughton Mill, traditionally held to have been planned in the pub. The building is regarded by CAMRA as having an interior of "outstanding national historic importance".	
Bay Mare 53.6033°N 2.4326°W	Stone public house	Blackburn Road, Astley Bridge, BL1	c. 1830	26 April 1974	II	1387920	Occupies part of an 1830 terrace of six houses, with mapping showing the site in residential use until a pub first appears on the 1939 Ordnance Survey. By the late 20th century it was a Matthew Brown house, and it is now owned by Admiral Taverns.	
Finishers Arms 53.5916°N 2.4681°W	Stone public house	Church Road, Bolton, BL1	c. 1830	26 April 1974	II	1387968	Designated a listed building together with three adjoining terraced houses. It was recorded as a Greenall Whitley house by 1982 and has been independently owned and operated since 2008.	
The Swan 53.5795°N 2.4266°W	Painted-brick public house	Churchgate, Bolton, BL1	1845	23 April 1952	II	1387974	A multi‑phase building developed between about 1800 and 1900, with CAMRA giving a date of 1845; it appeared on early 20th‑century mapping as the Swan Hotel. A 1990 demolition proposal was withdrawn following local opposition, and the pub reopened in 1992 with several themed bars. It stands directly beside Ye Olde Man & Scythe.	
Stork Tavern 53.5959°N 2.4492°W	Stone public house	Halliwell Road, Halliwell, BL1	c. 1850	26 April 1974	II	1388055	A mid‑19th‑century building, though a local report traces an earlier pub of the same name on the site to 1789, with the name still in use in the 1920s. It later trading under names including the Fox and Stork, and its former bowling green now serves as a beer garden.	
The Brooklyn 53.5592°N 2.4234°W	Red-brick and stone house in a Gothic style	Green Lane, Great Lever, BL3	1859	26 April 1974	II	1388046	Designed by George Woodhouse in a Gothic style and completed in 1859 as a private house for Thomas Walmsley, its "date and initials are on the little tower". It later became the Brooklyn Hotel and retained a bowling green into the late 20th century. The pub was a Greenall Whitley house by 1981 and remained so until about 1996, when it was acquired by Holts. It closed in 2019 and was later converted for use by Lord's Independent School.	
Yates Wine Lodge 53.5789°N 2.4270°W	Terracotta public house	Bradshawgate, Bolton, BL1	1906	30 April 1999	II	1387943	Operated for many years as a branch of the Yates's pub chain under Stonegate's ownership. A proposed rebranding to Slug and Lettuce in 2023 did not proceed, and the pub continued trading as Yates until its permanent closure in January 2025. As of April 2026, Stonegate had reported no further update on the building's future. It is described as "floridly Renaissance" with "circular windows and a shallow oriel on the top floor".	
26–28 Bradshawgate 53.5791°N 2.4271°W	Terracotta hotel with a large chimney	Bradshawgate, Bolton, BL1	1907	22 September 1998	II	1387932	Originally the Fleece Hotel, a substantial Edwardian building with an ornate terracotta façade that later traded under entertainment‑led names including the Gaiety and Maxims. By the early 21st century it was operating as the Flying Flute, closing in 2017 before being converted to mixed commercial use with flats above.	
The Shakespeare 53.5501°N 2.4034°W	Red-brick and terracotta public house in the Neo-Tudor style	Glynne Street, Farnworth, BL4	1926	13 February 2004	II	1390813	Built for Magee Marshall & Co and reputedly rebuilt after a fire, the pub was designed with a "calendar" theme. It is recognised by CAMRA for the national importance of its largely intact historic interior. After a period of decline, closure and changes in ownership, it has stood vacant since 2022. A 2026 proposal to convert the building into a nine‑bed HMO was refused, and there have been no further updates as of July 2026.	

== Bury ==
Listed pubs in the Metropolitan Borough of Bury
Name	Image	Location, postcode district	Constructed	Date designated	Grade	Entry number	Notes	Refs.
Two Tubs 53.5940°N 2.2979°W	Rendered public house	The Wylde, Bury, BL9	Late 17th century (probable)	29 January 1985	II	1067224	Thought to date from the late 17th century, although its official listing describes its age as uncertain. Later alterations include 18th‑century brickwork and 19th‑century render, possibly over an earlier timber frame. It was converted into a pub in 1806 and was previously known as the Globe Inn; the name Two Tubs arose in 1830 from a makeshift sign created by the landlord. As of July 2026, the building is owned by Thwaites Brewery.	
Duke William Inn 53.5888°N 2.3598°W	White-painted stone public house	Well Street, Ainsworth, BL2	1737	29 January 1985	II	1164029	The building carries a 1737 date but is thought to be a reworking of an earlier structure, with later alterations noted in its official listing. It began as a coaching inn and was used as the local coroner's court in the 1800s. It stands close to the Grade II* listed Presbyterian Chapel.	
Church Inn 53.5298°N 2.2862°W	Rendered public house	Church Lane, Prestwich, M25	18th century	30 June 1966	II	1067251	Although the official listing dates the building to the 18th century, CAMRA records an earlier origin and cites 1629 as the earliest known date. Local traditions also refer to 17th‑century or earlier activity on the site, though these accounts are not supported by the listing. The pub was known as The Ostrich until 1823 and appears as the Church Inn on the 1893 Ordnance Survey map. As of 2025, its freehold was held by Stonegate.	
Shoulder of Mutton 53.6458°N 2.3314°W	Stone public house	Holcombe Village, Holcombe, BL8	Late 18th century	29 January 1985	II	1318119	Thought to be a rebuilding or major alteration of an earlier inn; a datestone marked "1751" may indicate an earlier phase. It was historically associated with cockfighting, though the practice appears to have ceased after 1835. The pub was damaged during an airship raid in 1916, when residents sheltered in the cellar. It closed in 2022, and reopened in June 2023 following unspecified works.	
The Bank 53.5936°N 2.2988°W	Stone former bank	Market Street, Bury, BL9	c. 1860–1870	20 September 1974	II	1067240	Originally a branch of the Manchester and District Bank on land owned by the Earl of Derby, and it continued to appear as a bank on the 1910 and 1939 Ordnance Survey maps. It was included in the Bury Town Centre conservation area in 1978. The pub was refurbished in 2013 and reopened as The Bank in 2019 after previously operating within the Yates's chain. As of December 2023, its freehold was owned by Stonegate.	
Old White Lion 53.5936°N 2.2988°W	White-rendered public house	Bolton Street, Bury, BL9	Late 19th century	28 March 2019	II	1460925	A pub has occupied this plot since at least the mid‑19th century; the 1849 town plan shows an inn named the Old White Lion. The present building dates from the late 19th century and later gained a mid‑20th‑century rear extension. The pub passed to Crown Brewery in 1925 and subsequently to Whitbread before later being sold. It was formerly included on CAMRA's National Inventory and is now graded three stars for its nationally important historic interior. As of 2025, it is operated by Craft Union, a brand of Stonegate.	
Lord Raglan 53.6323°N 2.2893°W	Stone public house	Mount Pleasant, Nangreaves, BL9	Late 19th century (probable)	29 April 1976	II	1318119	Built on a site formerly occupied by a butcher's shop serving travellers between Manchester and Burnley, the building was later converted into a pub and renamed the Lord Raglan after FitzRoy Somerset, 1st Baron Raglan. The pub stayed in the same family from 1954 until its sale in 2017, after which local attempts to buy the site were unsuccessful. Following its closure that year, a 2022 proposal to convert the building and add housing on the car park was refused, while a revised 2024 application for five flats was approved in 2025.	

== Manchester ==
Listed pubs in Manchester
Name	Image	Location, postcode district	Constructed	Date designated	Grade	Entry number	Notes	Refs.
Old Wellington Inn 53.4847°N 2.2440°W	Timber-framed building	Cathedral Gates, Shambles Square, M3	1552	25 February 1952	II	1270698	Originally partly a draper's shop with other uses, it became a pub in 1830. It was raised 5 feet (1.5 m) in 1971 during Arndale Centre works, then dismantled and moved in the late 1990s as part of the post‑1996 Manchester bombing redevelopment of Exchange Square. Architectural historian Clare Hartwell notes that the efforts to preserve the building, "when more important Manchester buildings have disappeared without a trace", illustrate "an enduring 20th‑century love affair with timber framing".	
Red Lion 53.4313°N 2.2290°W	White-rendered pub	Wilmslow Road, Withington, M20	17th century	3 October 1974	II	1270511	Originally a farmhouse or small roadside inn, it is the oldest surviving building in Withington and later underwent various renovations while retaining early vernacular features.	
Olde Cock Inn 53.4107°N 2.2311°W	Grey‑painted pub	Wilmslow Road, Didsbury, M20	Late 18th century	3 October 1974	II	1254964	Formerly an inn with varied uses, it incorporates 18th‑century fabric and timber framing, reflecting its long role in Didsbury village, and returned to pub‑restaurant operation in 2011.	
The Badger 53.4816°N 2.2340°W	Red-brick terrace	Dale Street, Northern Quarter, M1	Late 18th century	3 October 1974	II	1209604	Part of a joint listing with Nos. 26 and 28, the former townhouse at No. 24 has had its ground floor combined with that of No. 26 to form a pub and bar space that has traded under various names since its early 19th‑century use as the Haunch of Venison. Later operating as Nickleby's and other bars, it reopened as The Badger in spring 2026.	
The City 53.4844°N 2.2334°W	White-rendered pub	Oldham Street, Northern Quarter, M4	Late 18th century (probable)	3 October 1974	II	1271456	Originated as two dwellings and was combined into a pub by 1800. It retains a simple domestic frontage and is one of the few surviving early buildings on Oldham Street. Hartwell describes it as "a good late 19th‑century timber front with carved pilasters and fanlights". As of March 2026, CAMRA records the pub as "closed long term".	
City Arms 53.4794°N 2.2429°W	Brick-faced pub with scored stucco	Kennedy Street, City Centre, M2	Late 18th century (probable)	3 October 1974	II	1197933	Originated as a townhouse with a modest Georgian frontage and traditional plan, as part of a short terrace beside the Vine Inn. Refurbished around 1900 and altered through the 20th century, it retains a 1930s rear saloon with Art Deco features, with further changes made in the 1970s when it became a Tetley "Festival Ale House".	
Vine Inn 53.4796°N 2.2426°W	White-rendered pub with green tiled façade	Kennedy Street, City Centre, M2	Late 18th century (probable, No. 46), c. 1860–1870 (Nos. 42 and 44)	3 October 1974 (No. 46), 6 June 1994 (Nos. 42 and 44)	II	1282982, 1197932	Began as a townhouse at No. 46, with Nos. 42 and 44 added as a textile warehouse around 1860 to 1870. No. 46 was a pub by the 1880s and was linked to the former warehouse in the 1970s. Although now a single pub, it occupies two separately listed buildings and stands next to the City Arms.	
Grey Horse Inn 53.4779°N 2.2397°W	Terrace of commercial buildings	Portland Street, City Centre, M1	Late 18th century (probable)	6 June 1994	II	1246954	Part of a listed terrace, it retains the scale of its domestic origins and is often noted as one of the city's smallest pubs. It is three doors away from the Circus Tavern.	
Circus Tavern 53.4778°N 2.2400°W	Brick-faced pub with scored stucco	Portland Street, City Centre, M1	Late 18th or early 19th century	6 June 1994	II	1247057	Originally a house, it became a pub around 1840 and is often noted as one of Manchester's smallest pubs, retaining a compact traditional interior. Hartwell calls it "an almost miraculous survival, considering the tiny scale of it all". It is three doors away from the Grey Horse Inn.	
Hare and Hounds 53.4851°N 2.2379°W	Painted brick and glazed‑tile pub	Shudehill, Northern Quarter, M4	c. 1800	10 December 1999	II	1379936	Retains much of an intact historic interior from around 1925, recognised by CAMRA as of "outstanding national historic importance". Hartwell describes it as having "a remarkably complete interwar interior".	
The Bank 53.4797°N 2.2403°W	Sandstone library in the Greek Revival style	Mosley Street, City Centre, M2	1802–1806	25 February 1952	II*	1197930	Part of the Portico Library building, designed by Thomas Harrison, it was identified by Hartwell as "Manchester's earliest Greek Revival building". It was originally a subscription library, later a bank, and is now a pub, with the library on the first floor.	
Peveril of the Peak 53.4753°N 2.2416°W	Pub with green glazed-tile façade	Great Bridgewater Street, Deansgate, M1	c. 1820	19 June 1988	II	1293058	With its distinctive tiled façade, it is a rare surviving late-Georgian corner pub, recognised by CAMRA for an interior of "outstanding national historic importance".	
The Brunswick 53.4800°N 2.2333°W	Pub with a rendered exterior	Piccadilly, M1	Early 19th century	3 October 1974	II	1271113	Originally composed of a hotel and two townhouses. While Historic England dates the present structure to the early 19th century, some local accounts suggest a pub called The Brunswick stood on the site from the 1790s.	
New Union 53.4763°N 2.2385°W	Red-brick pub with a white-rendered ground floor	Princess Street, City Centre, M1	Early 19th century	3 October 1974	II	1247444	Established as the Union Hotel around 1860—its name reportedly deriving from an anecdotal reference to the union of territories within what was then the British Empire—and has operated as a largely LGBTQ venue since the Second World War, adopting its current name in the 1970s.	
Briton's Protection 53.4750°N 2.2473°W	White-rendered pub with black detailing	Great Bridgewater Street, Deansgate, M1	Early 19th century	16 March 1990	II	1292050	Recognised by CAMRA for its interior of "outstanding national historic importance", and reportedly has a long‑standing local association with the Peterloo era.	
The Churchill 53.4778°N 2.2361°W	White-rendered brick pub	Chorlton Street, City Centre, M1	Early 19th century	6 June 1994	II	1197758	Recorded as the Mechanics Arms by the mid‑19th century and has operated as a pub since the 1850s, later adopting the name Churchills and becoming one of the gay village's longest‑established venues. It now trades as The Church.	
Crown and Kettle 53.4852°N 2.2297°W	Buff-brick pub	Oldham Road, Ancoats, M4	Early 19th century (probable)	3 October 1974	II	1246276	Opened around 1800 and previously known as the Iron Dish and Cob of Coal, it occupies a site recorded since the 18th century and is noted for its distinctive interior features, including snug panelling traditionally linked to the R100 or R101 airships. Closed in 1989 following a fight between football fans and, after an arson attack in the 1990s, it reopened in 2005 after restoration.	
Castle Hotel 53.4841°N 2.2323°W	Pub with brown glazed tiles and white render	Oldham Street, Northern Quarter, M4	Early to mid-19th century	19 June 1988	II	1246280	Stands on a site occupied by a pub since the 18th century. Remodelled around 1904 with a tiled frontage, it is recognised by CAMRA for its historic interior. It later became a live‑music venue and was restored and reopened in 2009 after a period of closure.	
Wetherspoons 53.4811°N 2.2351°W	Red-brick and sandstone building	Piccadilly, M1	1846–47	6 June 1994	II	1246670	Built for a textile firm, it later served as a clothiers' warehouse and a bank, and is now used as offices, with the ground floor occupied by a pub operated by J. D. Wetherspoon.	
Lass O'Gowrie 53.4739°N 2.2378°W	Red-brick pub with glazed tiles	Charles Street, City Centre, M1	Mid-19th century	6 June 1994	II	1293175	Remodelled around 1900 with glazed tiles, having once serving Irish migrants before later drawing a largely local and student clientele. It takes its name from a 19th‑century poem by the Scottish writer Carolina Nairne.	
Memorial Hall 53.4788°N 2.2461°W	Red-brick and grey-stone building in the Venetian Gothic Revival style	Southmill Street, City Centre, M2	1864–1866	14 February 1972	II*	1254637	Designed by Thomas Worthington, it was converted to licensed use in the early 21st century after a long period as meeting rooms and event space. It then operated for several years as the Albert Square Chop House before reopening in 2021 as the Fountain House, a pub‑restaurant occupying the lower floors and basement. Hartwell describes it as Venetian Gothic, "with ranges of traceried windows".	
Rampant Lion 53.4565°N 2.2161°W	Red-brick pub in the Gothic style	Anson Road, Victoria Park, M14	Mid to late 19th century	2 May 1973	II	1197827	Closed in 2013 after a long period as a traditional Joseph Holt's pub. It was refurbished and converted in 2017 for mixed hospitality use, with hotel rooms, a café, and associated courtyard spaces incorporated into the former pub buildings.	
Derby Brewery Arms 53.4931°N 2.2402°W	Red-brick and sandstone pub	Cheetham Hill Road, Cheetham, M8	Mid to late 19th century	3 October 1974	II	1197784	Originally the Knowsley Hotel near Joseph Holt's Derby Brewery, it had become a pub by 1950 and later joined the Holt estate, with its current name adopted at an unknown date. It now operates as a traditional pub that also hosts DJ events and electronic music.	
Mawson Hotel 53.4800°N 2.2333°W	Red-brick pub	Frances Street, Chorlton-on-Medlock, M13	Mid to late 19th century	31 March 2010	II	1393734	Originally a small hotel, it was amalgamated with two neighbouring houses and rebuilt in 1936–37, creating the present corner block. It continued in use as a pub until its closure in 2012. As of May 2026, no subsequent proposals for its reuse have been recorded.	
The Turville 53.4699°N 2.2652°W	Red-brick pub in the Italianate style	Chester Road, Hulme, M15	c. 1870	6 June 1994	II	1283069	Originally a small neighbourhood pub, it had already closed by the time it was listed and is now in use as an architectural salvage and antique shop, Insitu Manchester.	
Lloyd and Platt 53.4424°N 2.2812°W	Red-brick and sandstone pub	Wilbraham Road, Chorlton-cum-Hardy, M21	c. 1870	3 April 2003	II	1096127	Began as the Lloyd and Platt's Hotel, named for landowner George Lloyd and builder James Platt, before becoming The Lloyds, and continues to operate as a J. W. Lees pub.	
256 Wilmslow Road 53.4430°N 2.2188°W	Sandstone building in the Gothic style	Wilmslow Road, Fallowfield, M14	1870–1872	6 June 1994	II	1254889	Occupies a building that originally served as the school for the Church of the Holy Innocents before its later conversion to licensed use. It traded for many years under the Queen of Hearts name and now operates as a sports bar.	
Plymouth Grove Hotel 53.4645°N 2.2232°W	Red-brick and sandstone pub	Plymouth Grove, Chorlton-on-Medlock, M13	1873	3 October 1974	II	1271094	Closed in 2003 after a long period as a neighbourhood hotel‑pub, it remained vacant and derelict until its conversion to restaurant use in 2016.	
Sawyers Arms 53.4808°N 2.2483°W	Pub with a stucco and terracotta exterior on a street corner	Deansgate, M3	Late 19th century	3 October 1974	II	1282973	Built on a site with licensed premises recorded from the 1730s. After closing in 1988 and being converted to retail use, it was restored to pub use by Nicholson's and reopened in 2014 following refurbishment.	
Woodstock Arms 53.4217°N 2.2456°W	Red-brick public house in a Queen Anne style	Barlow Moor Road, West Didsbury, M20	Late 19th century	27 April 1992	II	1197801	Originally a detached house; later used as a British Council office, which occupied the building when it was listed in 1992. A planning application to convert it into a pub was validated later that year.	
The Plough 53.4610°N 2.1714°W	Red-brick pub	Hyde Road, Gorton, M18	Late 19th century	7 March 1994	II	1200820	A long‑established neighbourhood pub, it contains a CAMRA‑recognised interior of "outstanding national historic importance".	
Star and Garter 53.4761°N 2.2268°W	Red-brick pub	Fairfield Street, Piccadilly, M1	1877	20 June 1988	II	1200827	Originally built in 1803 in the "Queen Anne style", before being dismantled and moved to its present site during railway expansion, it began as a hotel and later became a pub, which closed in 1986. Purchased privately in 1990, it was refurbished and reopened in 1991 as a pub, live‑music venue, and nightclub.	
White Lion 53.4335°N 2.2293°W	Red-brick pub with a clock tower in the Eclectic Gothic style	Wilmslow Road, Withington, M20	1881	20 June 1988	II	1255026	A long‑established pub in Withington, it closed in 2005 and was later converted for retail use, with the upper floors adapted as apartments, reopening as a Sainsbury's Local in 2011.	
Marble Arch Inn 53.4883°N 2.2319°W	Buff-brick and stone pub	Rochdale Road, Ancoats, M4	1888	20 June 1988	II	1247604	Built on the site of an earlier McKenna's Brewery house. Hartwell calls it "the only one of the pubs in the area with architectural pretensions". The pub contains a CAMRA‑recognised interior of "outstanding national historic importance" and remains the flagship venue of the Marble Brewery, which moved its brewing operations to Salford after 1997.	
Mr Thomas's Chop House 53.48135°N 2.24487°W	Narrow red-brick and buff-terracotta building with an elaborately carved cartouche	Cross Street, City Centre, M2	1901	3 October 1974	II	1197767	Built on the former site of the 1867 Thomas's Chop House, the front section was designed by Mills & Murgatroyd and the rear section by Woodhouse & Willoughby; "the corner entrance, two‑storey oriel and elaborate crowning gable combine with lively effect". CAMRA recognises the interior as of "outstanding national historic importance". The Chop House still trades on the ground floor, with commercial premises above.	
The Grosvenor 53.4701°N 2.2367°W	Green and white faience-tiled cinema	Grosvenor Street, Chorlton-on-Medlock, M1	1912	3 October 1974	II	1218431	Originally the Grosvenor Picture Palace, it was the largest cinema outside London in its day. After its closure, the building was used as a bingo hall and a snooker club in the late 1960s, and has been a pub since 1990 under various names.	
The Unicorn 53.4829°N 2.2370°W	Red-brick and faience pub in the neo-Georgian style	Church Street, Northern Quarter, M4	1924	28 June 2019	II	1464011	Formerly the Unicorn Hotel, it is an inter‑war improved pub, altered only in minor ways, and is noted by CAMRA for an interior of "outstanding national historic importance".	

== Oldham ==
Listed pubs in the Metropolitan Borough of Oldham
Name	Image	Location, postcode district	Constructed	Date designated	Grade	Entry number	Notes	Refs.
Grapes Inn 53.5419°N 2.0678°W	Stone public house	St John Street, Lees, OL4	1741	22 August 1967	II	1356417	The door lintel carries a 1741 date, although the building was later altered and extended. The pub was operated by Inglenook Inns and Taverns in 2021 and, as of 2024, was owned by Punch Taverns. In 2024, Oldham Council approved plans for three homes on part of the car park, reducing parking spaces and prompting local objections over traffic and parking.	
Cross Keys Inn, Uppermill 53.5530°N 1.9889°W	Stone public house	Running Hill Gate, Uppermill, OL3	1745	19 June 1967	II	1356384	The door lintel bears the inscription "MB SB 1745", thought to mark the building's construction, with a 19th‑century rear addition. It first opened as an inn in 1763 and was later known as The Gravemakers, reflecting an earlier use as a mortuary. The 1892 Ordnance Survey marks it as the Cross Keys Inn. By the late 2010s it was operated as a J.W. Lees tenancy, and in 2026 it was reported to have appeared in CAMRA's Good Beer Guide 46 times across the preceding half‑century.	
Swan Inn 53.5563°N 2.0129°W	Stone public house	The Square, Dobcross, OL3	1765	3 July 1986	II	1356398	A datestone carries the inscription "BW SW 1765", thought to mark the building's construction under Benjamin Wrigley; a 19th‑century addition stands to the rear. The upstairs room was used as a magistrates' court in the 18th century. The 1892 Ordnance Survey marks it as the King’s Head, though later editions omit a name. Local reporting in the 2010s shows the pub being operated by Marston's, and it is locally known as the Top House, though the origin of this name is uncertain.	
Pack Horse Inn 53.5123°N 2.1554°W	Stone public house	Wrigley Head, Failsworth, M35	Early 18th century (probable)	24 March 1966	II	1162698	The building appears as an inn on the 1894 Ordnance Survey and as a pub on the 1935 edition, though no name is shown. It was delicensed in 2015, after which it was converted for office use.	
White Lion 53.5691°N 2.0235°W	Stone public house	Delph Lane, Delph, OL1	Mid to late 18th century	3 July 1986	II	1356724	Originally constructed as three separate houses, it appears as an inn on the 1894 Ordnance Survey. From 1965 to 1990 it was run by former West Indian cricketer Sonny Ramadhin and his wife. The pub was refurbished in 2014, and, as of May 2026, is owned by Thwaites Brewery.	
Hare and Hounds 53.5479°N 2.0058°W	Stone public house	High Street, Uppermill, OL3	Late 18th century	3 July 1986	II	1356716	The building appears as an inn on the 1893 and 1945 Ordnance Survey maps, though no name is shown. As of 2023, it is owned by Punch Taverns.	
White Hart 53.5359°N 2.0415°W	Stone public house	Stockport Road, Lydgate, OL4	1790s	18 February 1987	II	1356426	Originally a house, a use that may align with later references to it functioning as a weavers' cottage before its conversion to a pub. It incorporates later additions and is recorded as having served at different times as a police station with a jail, a schoolhouse, and a lookout point during the Second World War. The building now operates as a multi‑room free house with a restaurant, function rooms and guest accommodation.	
Cross Keys Inn, Delph 53.5596°N 2.0311°W	Stone building	Oldham Road, Delph, OL3	Early 19th century	3 July 1986	II	1318060	The building is thought to have been established around the opening of the Oldham–Austerlands turnpike to serve passing trade. From 2005 to 2020 the premises housed the Shanghai Wong restaurant following conversion, though the pub's closure date is not recorded. In 2021 Oldham Council approved plans to convert the building to residential use.	
Royal Oak 53.5418°N 2.1051°W	Red-brick public house	Union Street, Oldham, OL1	Early to mid-19th century	7 March 2018	II	1451862	Extended and re‑fronted in 1872, its interior was redesigned in 1928–29 by Taylor Roberts and Bowman. CAMRA rates the interior three stars and regards it as of outstanding national historic importance. The pub was closed and sold in 2023, with internal damage subsequently reported. In 2024 a local group secured asset of community value status, giving the community the right to bid if it is marketed. As of May 2026, no public information is available on its condition or future use.	

== Rochdale ==
Listed pubs in the Metropolitan Borough of Rochdale
Name	Image	Location, postcode district	Constructed	Date designated	Grade	Entry number	Notes	Refs.
Olde Boar's Head 53.5529°N 2.1969°W	Black‑and‑white timber‑framed public house	Long Street, Middleton, M24	1622	15 March 1957	II*	1162256	Dendrochronology undertaken in 2016 dated the earliest timbers to 1622, confirming the first construction phase. A 1623 inventory in Isaac Walkden's will indicates that the building operated as an inn from the outset. Commissioned by Sir Ralph Assheton on glebe land between the rectory and St Leonard's Church, it was enlarged in 1654 and later altered; architectural historian Clare Hartwell describes it as a "pretty timber‑framed building with three unequal ornamental gables".	
Rake Inn 53.6457°N 2.0863°W	Stone public house	Blackstone Edge Old Road, Littleborough, OL15	1690	2 January 1967	II	1068535	An inscription on the door surround indicates construction in 1690; the building was later altered and extended. The 1893 and 1930 Ordnance Survey maps record it as the Rake Inn. Since 2007 the premises have operated chiefly as a tapas restaurant and also provide guest accommodation.	
Egerton Arms 53.6213°N 2.2273°W	Stone building	Chapel Lane, Ashworth, OL11	Early to mid-18th century	12 February 1985	II	1187085	The 1910 Ordnance Survey map records it as the Egerton Arms pub. Anecdotal reports state that it closed in 2004; a 2008 photograph indicates it was no longer trading, with June 2012 Google Street View imagery showing it in residential use.	
Blue Bell Inn 53.6170°N 2.1586°W	Stone building with decorative gables	Yorkshire Street and Newgate, Rochdale, OL16	1745 and 1911	12 February 1985	II	1084228	Originally a hotel and later a Yates's Wine Lodge, the building incorporates a Yorkshire Street frontage dated 1745 and an Edwardian frontage to Newgate bearing the inscription "Wine Lodge 1911". A blue plaque states that the inn was one of only four pubs recorded in the 1626 Manor Survey of Rochdale. The building is now in commercial use.	
Globe Inn 53.6504°N 2.1342°W	Stone public house	Ramsden Road, Wardle, OL12	Mid to late 18th century	29 June 1966	II	1084236	The 1893 and 1930 Ordnance Survey maps record it as an inn without an attributed name, and by the 1940 edition it is marked as a pub. By 2011 it was owned by Enterprise Inns and had been voted the Rochdale Observer readers' favourite pub the previous year. It underwent a temporary closure in 2013, with rising beer prices and increased rent cited locally as contributing factors. As of 2025 it is owned by Admiral Taverns.	
Reed Hotel 53.6188°N 2.1572°W	Red-brick public house	Reed Hill, Rochdale, OL12	Late 18th century	12 February 1985	II	1038323	Originally constructed as a hotel, the 1893 Ordnance Survey map shows it without a designation, and the 1910 edition marks it as a pub. It closed in April 2024, and a December proposal sought to convert the building into ten flats.	
The Bobbin 53.6111°N 2.1124°W	Stone public house	Dale Street, Milnrow, OL16	1790	24 January 1967	II	1162521	The 1893 and 1930 Ordnance Survey maps record it as a pub without an attributed name. By April 2023 it had rebranded as the Tim Bobbin, named after the Lancastrian poet; Google Street View imagery confirms the change had occurred by then. As of 2025 it is run by Craft Union, a division of Stonegate.	
Owd Betts 53.6406°N 2.2591°W	Stone public house	Edenfield Road, Rochdale, OL12	1796	12 February 1985	II	1084290	The pub was originally known as the Hare and Hounds under landlords Richard and Mary Ashworth. In 1869 it was taken over by Betty Ashworth, known locally as "Owd Bett"; by 1950 it was officially renamed Owd Betts in her honour. Her headstone, long thought lost, was rediscovered in 2016 at nearby St Paul's Church.	
Old Duke 53.6431°N 2.0886°W	Stone house	Ealees, Littleborough, OL15	1820	23 April 1986	II	1068508	The building was constructed for engine maker Edmund Kershaw, with three workers' cottages added to the rear in the 1850s and later incorporated into a single residence. By 1860 it was operating as a pub known as the Duke of Norfolk, though the 1893 Ordnance Survey map does not record it as such. It is now in use as a private residence.	
The Wheatsheaf 53.6436°N 2.0959°W	Semi-circular stone building	Church Street, Littleborough, OL15	Early 1860s	23 April 1986	II	1068526	The present building dates from the early 1860s. The name Wheat Sheaf is recorded much earlier, with directories listing Robert Hirst as publican in 1821 and the name documented as far back as 1780. The 1893 and 1941 Ordnance Survey maps record the building as a hotel without an attributed name. Hartwell describes it as "built semicircular to command both road and railway approaches". As of 2025, the pub's freehold is owned by Stonegate.	
Cemetery Hotel 53.6133°N 2.1817°W	Red-brick public house	Bury Road, Rochdale, OL11	1860s (possible)	20 September 2010	II	1393976	The building takes its name from the adjoining Rochdale Cemetery, established in 1855. The pub likely served mourners and others attending burials. The 1910 Ordnance Survey map records it as the Cemetery Hotel. In the early 20th century it received a full interior refit by the Crown Brewery Company of Bury, and its interior is recognised by CAMRA with a three‑star rating for "outstanding national historic importance". As of February 2026 the freehold is owned by Punch Pubs.	

== Salford ==
Listed pubs in the City of Salford
Name	Image	Location, postcode district	Constructed	Date designated	Grade	Entry number	Notes	Refs.
Worsley Old Hall 53.5054°N 2.3910°W	Large black‑and‑white timber‑framed and rendered building with tall brick chimneys, with people sitting at picnic benches on the grass in front	Walkden Road, Worsley, M28	17th century (probably earlier)	29 July 1966	II	1288296	Timber‑framed house of 17th‑century origin, later rebuilt in brick and altered in the 18th, mid‑19th and early 20th centuries. The hall was the meeting place for Francis Egerton, James Brindley and John Gilbert during the planning of the Bridgewater Canal. Converted to restaurant use in the late 20th century and now a pub.	
White Horse 53.5030°N 2.3592°W	Rendered public house	Worsley Road, Swinton, M27	Mid to late 18th century, 20th century (partly rebuilt)	30 March 1966	II	1067480	CAMRA regards it as Swinton's oldest pub and notes that it was once a Boddington's house, though the dates are not given. As of May 2025, the freehold is owned by Greene King.	
Punch Bowl 53.4846°N 2.2502°W	Red-brick building	Chapel Street, Salford, M3	1817 (mainly), late 19th century (refronted)	9 March 1989	II	1386114	Mainly constructed as two separate pubs, including the Waggon and Horses. These were later combined to form a single establishment, although the date of amalgamation is not recorded. CAMRA records that it closed around 2010, after which the building was converted for office use. It stands directly opposite the mid‑18th‑century, Grade II* listed Sacred Trinity Church.	
The Crescent 53.4829°N 2.2670°W	Rendered public house	Crescent, Salford, M5	Early 19th century	18 January 1980	II	1386171	Originally a terrace of three houses before later being combined and converted into a pub. Local tradition holds that Karl Marx and Friedrich Engels were among its past visitors. The pub closed in August 2017 and subsequently fell into disrepair. In October 2025, an urgent works notice was issued requiring the private owners to safeguard the building, after the council judged intervention necessary to prevent its loss. The owners then stated they would undertake the required repairs themselves. As of May 2026, no information has been released about its condition or future use.	
The Crown 53.4841°N 2.2487°W	Red-brick public house with a tiled ground floor	Blackfriars Street, Salford, M3	Early 19th century	18 January 1980	II	1386084	Given a tiled street front in the late 19th century with "Crown Hotel" spelled out in the tilework. The 1922 and 1933 Ordnance Survey maps show it in use as a pub, although neither records a name. The pub closed in 1970, and the building was later converted into a nail bar and beauty salon in 2012.	
Queen's Arms 53.4850°N 2.3585°W	Brick public house	Green Lane, Patricroft, M30	1828	9 March 1989	II	1067506	Established as a refreshment stop ahead of the opening of the Liverpool and Manchester Railway in 1830, a claim that has led to it being described as the world's first railway pub. It was renamed the Queen's Arms after Queen Victoria's visit to Salford in 1851; its earlier name is not recorded. The building underwent alterations in the early 20th century. CAMRA regards its interior as of "very special national historic importance" and rates it two stars, and it is locally known as the Top House, although the origin of that name is uncertain.	
The Maypole 53.4929°N 2.2840°W	Stone building in a High Victorian Gothic style	Broughton Road, Pendleton, M6	c. 1860	18 February 1998	II	1386098	A contemporary source records that it was built as a hotel designed by the Manchester architect James Redford for James Addison. It took its name from a maypole that once stood beside the site, raised by local subscription to replace an earlier pole. Anecdotal recollections suggest that it closed in the early 1990s. It was later converted to residential use, although the date of conversion is not documented.	
The Ellesmere 53.5185°N 2.3970°W	Stone building in a High Victorian Gothic style	Walkden Road, Walkden, M28	1860s or 1870s	2 September 1987	II	1287521	Constructed to serve passengers using the neighbouring Walkden Stocks station, which closed in 1954. The 1893 and 1938 Ordnance Survey maps mark it as the Ellesmere Hotel pub, with the earlier edition also showing a bowling green beside it. The building was later converted to office use, although the date of the conversion is not recorded.	
Stanley Arms 53.4816°N 2.3570°W	Red-brick public house	Liverpool Road, Eccles, M30	Late 19th century	2 April 2014	II	1415745	Taken over by Joseph Holt's in 1910, when alterations are thought to have been made and a neighbouring terraced house was later added to the building. It was previously included on CAMRA's National Inventory of Historic Pub Interiors and is now rated three stars under the organisation's revised system, with its interior considered of "outstanding national historic importance". As of June 2026, Holt's owns the freehold, and the pub has been described as one of the smallest in Greater Manchester.	
King's Arms 53.4841°N 2.2559°W	Red-brick public house in a Gothic style	Bloom Street, Salford, M3	1879	1 December 1987	II	1386087	An earlier King's Arms stood on the opposite side of the road and was licensed from 1807. The present building replaced that earlier house. Between 2011 and 2015 it was run under a lease held by musician Paul Heaton, during which it developed a reputation as a centre for artistic activity. As of 2026, it includes a theatre space that hosts performances and related events.	
Black Friar 53.4866°N 2.2535°W	Red-brick public house	Blackfriars Road, Salford, M3	1886	15 April 1994	II	1386081	Built for Henry Boddington II and attributed to the Manchester architect William Ball, replacing the Old School Inn after Blackfriars Road was laid out in the 1880s. It was at one time part of the Boddingtons Brewery estate. After standing closed and derelict for around 20 years, during which it suffered vandalism and a major fire, the Black Friar reopened in 2021 as a gastropub.	
Eagle Inn 53.4873°N 2.2511°W	Red-brick public house in an Edwardian Baroque style	Collier Street, Salford, M3	1902	20 March 2006	II	1392691	A rainwater head dated 1902 may relate to a later re‑fronting rather than the original structure. CAMRA regards the interior as of "special national historic importance" and rates it one star. After the lease was taken on by Rupert Hill and his business partner in 2012, the former terraced house was adapted as a live‑music space. The freehold is owned by Joseph Holt's, and the building forms a group with the Grade II* listed Public Baths opposite, designed by Thomas Worthington.	
The Grapes 53.4788°N 2.3642°W	Red-brick public house in the Jacobethan style	Liverpool Road, Peel Green, M30	1903	15 April 1994	II	1084300	Built by Mr Newton of Hartley, Hacking & Co. for Joseph Holt's and is one of three pubs in Eccles designed for the brewery by the firm, alongside the Royal Oak and the Lamb Hotel. Formerly included on CAMRA's National Inventory of Historic Pub Interiors, it is now rated three stars under the organisation's revised scheme, with its interior regarded as of "outstanding national historic importance". The pub has remained in Holt's ownership since it opened.	
Royal Oak 53.4820°N 2.3404°W	Red-brick public house in the Edwardian Baroque style	Barton Lane, Eccles, M30	1904	15 April 1994	II	1346234	Built by Mr Newton of Hartley, Hacking & Co. for Joseph Holt's, and forms part of a trio of Eccles pubs designed by the same firm, alongside the Grapes Hotel and the Lamb Hotel. It was formerly included on CAMRA's National Inventory of Historic Pub Interiors. The pub closed in September 2016 and was subsequently sold to private owners, with planning permission granted in 2017 for its conversion into housing.	
Lamb Hotel 53.4835°N 2.3334°W	Red-brick public house in an Eclectic style	Regent Street, Eccles, M30	1906	15 April 1994	II	1084301	Designed by Hartley, Hacking & Co. and constructed by Mr Newton for Joseph Holt's, one of three Eccles pubs produced by the practice, alongside the Grapes Hotel and the Royal Oak. Formerly included on CAMRA's National Inventory of Historic Pub Interiors, it is now rated three stars under the organisation's revised scheme, with its interior regarded as of "outstanding national historic importance". The pub has remained in Holt's ownership since it opened.	
Coach and Horses 53.4819°N 2.3040°W	Red-brick public house	Eccles New Road, Weaste, M5	1913	30 January 2012	II	1403265	Built for the Rochdale & Manor Brewery and originally stood among terraced housing, almost all of which has since been demolished. It was acquired by Samuel Smiths in 1947. CAMRA rates the interior three stars and regards it as of "outstanding national historic importance". Repair and renovation work took place in 2014, it closed temporarily in early 2017, reopened later that year, and closed permanently in October 2021. As of May 2026, no information has been released about its condition or future use.	

== Stockport ==
Listed pubs in the Metropolitan Borough of Stockport
Name	Image	Location, postcode district	Constructed	Date designated	Grade	Entry number	Notes	Refs.
Angel Inn 53.4115°N 2.1573°W	Public house with decorative plaster mouldings on the upper floors	Market Place, Stockport, SK1	16th century (probable)	15 May 2025	II	1490434	Originated as a 16th‑century house with later additions, on a site linked to Cotterel's inn in the 1640s. A rear wing was added around 1661 using reused medieval timbers, and the frontage was rebuilt and heightened in the late 18th or early 19th century, possibly when it became known as the Angel Inn. The façade was reworked in the mid‑1800s, and by the late 19th century parts of the building housed shops. A new frontage by T. H. Allen followed in 1886. It operated as a Bell's Brewery house until closing in 1951, and later became a single shopfront. A community café opened in 2014, and the Angel Inn returned to pub use in 2018.	
John Millington 53.3741°N 2.1857°W	Pale-brick and stone public house	Station Road, Cheadle Hulme, SK8	Late 17th century	11 October 1985	II	1241640	Built as a house for the alderman John Millington, it was later used for hand‑loom silk weaving and came into the ownership of the Hazeldine family. The building subsequently traded as the Millington Hall restaurant before reopening as the John Millington pub in 2006 following restoration by Hydes Brewery, who remain the freehold owners.	
Spread Eagle 53.4111°N 2.0993°W	Blue-painted and pale-stone public house	Hatherlow, Romiley, SK6	1722	11 October 1985	II	1242585	The year of construction is recorded on a datestone, and the building appears on the 1898 and 1936 Ordnance Survey maps as an unnamed pub. It underwent refurbishment in 2025 and, as of June 2026, is operated by Almond Family Pubs while the freehold remains with Greene King. It stands close to the towpath of the Peak Forest Canal.	
Strawberry Gardens 53.4023°N 2.1328°W	White‑painted public house	Offerton Lane, Offerton, SK2	Mid to late 18th century	10 March 1975	II	1260003	Includes a 19th‑century rear extension and two later side additions. It appears on the 1895 and 1938 Ordnance Survey maps without a recorded name. The property includes a large garden thought to have been a former bowling green, and its freehold was owned by Heineken UK as of 2021.	
George and Dragon 53.3951°N 2.2132°W	White‑painted public house	High Street, Cheadle, SK8	Late 18th century	11 October 1985	II	1241728	Appears on early 20th‑century Ordnance Survey maps, first as an unnamed hotel and later as a pub. CAMRA records a former association with Greenall's, though without dates, and the building reopened in 2014 after a five‑year closure following a sympathetic refurbishment by Amber Taverns, who continue to own the freehold.	
The Crown 53.4124°N 2.2032°W	White‑painted public house	Vale Close, Heaton Mersey, SK4	Late 18th or early 19th century	10 March 1975	II	1162341	Began as three or four cottages later combined to form an inn. It was acquired by Robinsons Brewery in 1912. The building forms a group with Nos. 2 and 4 Vale Close. In 2024 a blue plaque was installed to commemorate John Illingworth, a Heaton Mersey native who became a notable figure in Ecuador's independence movement.	
Queen's Head 53.4109°N 2.1576°W	Red-brick public house	Little Underbank, Underbank, SK1	Late 18th or early 19th century	10 March 1975	II	1067179	No. 12 Little Underbank became the pub's location after the earlier, larger Queen's Head next door was demolished for St Petersgate Bridge in the 1860s. Around 1930 the building's interior was remodelled into the present three‑room plan. Also known at one time as Turner's Vaults. Samuel Smith's altered the interior in the 1990s, and the pub closed in 2023; roof repairs followed in 2025, with no further update on its future as of June 2026.	
Arden Arms 53.4119°N 2.1549°W	Red-brick public house	Millgate and Corporation Street, Stockport, SK1	c. 1815	13 July 1988	II	1240421	The site has documented pub use since at least 1709. It was acquired by Robinsons Brewery in 1889, becoming one of their earliest tied houses. CAMRA rates its interior three stars and regards it as of "outstanding national historic importance". A blue plaque was added in 2017 to commemorate Elizabeth Raffald, who produced the first directory of Manchester and Salford in 1772, among other works, and whose nephew George Raffald was the pub's first landlord.	
Norfolk Arms 53.4017°N 2.0536°W	Stone public house	Town Street, Marple Bridge, SK6	Early 19th century	20 December 1967	II	1259997	Appears on late 19th and early 20th‑century Ordnance Survey maps as an unnamed pub. It was included in the newly created Marple Bridge conservation area in 1974. By 2012 the adjoining former NatWest branch was already in restaurant use, a change reflected in a 2017 amendment to the building's official listing. The pub stands opposite Marple Bridge, the Grade II‑listed structure that gives the settlement its name.	
Boar's Head 53.4119°N 2.1569°W	Red-brick public house	Vernon Street and Market Place, Stockport, SK1	Early 19th century	10 March 1975	II	1162926	The Market Place frontage was reworked in the late 19th century. It appears unnamed on the 1874 Ordnance Survey map and is recorded as a pub on the 1922 and 1936 editions. The building forms a group with 26 and 27 Market Place. The pub closed in November 2024 while Samuel Smith's sought a new tenant, and as of May 2026 no update on its status or future use has been published.	
Star and Garter 53.4032°N 2.1529°W	Red-brick public house	Higher Hillgate, Stockport, SK1	Early 19th century	10 March 1975	II	1067210	Originally a hotel before later operating as a pub. It became part of the Robinsons Brewery estate in 1949 following their acquisition of the Hempshaw Brook Brewery. Robinsons refurbished the exterior in mid‑2019 and continue to hold the freehold as of 2023.	
King's Arms 53.4119°N 2.1575°W	Red-brick and pale-stone building	Bridge Street Brow, Stockport, SK1	Early to mid-19th century	10 March 1975	II	1067193	Thought to have replaced an earlier inn called The Greyhound. By the 1840s it was known locally as The Hole in the Wall under the Baker family, who later operated the Bakers Vaults. The building forms a group with 1 Great Underbank and 26–28 Bridge Street Brow. Later alterations saw it used as a wine bar and then a furniture shop, and it is unoccupied as of June 2026.	
Bull's Head 53.4113°N 2.1570°W	Rendered public house	Market Place, Stockport, SK1	Mid-19th century	10 March 1975	II	1067182	A pub of the same name is recorded on the site from 1731. Early 19th‑century accounts describe political radicals Henry Hunt, Feargus O'Connor, and Richard Cobden addressing crowds from a balcony here, indicating that an earlier building preceded the present structure; a blue plaque records this history. The pub was acquired by Robinsons Brewery in 1917. It has remained closed since November 2011, and although Robinsons announced plans for refurbishment in 2020, no further information on the building's condition or future use had been published as of May 2026.	
Bakers Vaults 53.4118°N 2.1572°W	Red-brick public house	Market Place, Stockport, SK1	Late 19th century	10 March 1975	II	1067183	Stands on the former site of the George and Dragon, an inn of about 1775 built on the surviving foundations of Stockport Castle and demolished in the late 19th century. It became part of the Robinsons Brewery estate in 1929 following their acquisition of Kays Atlas Brewery, and forms a group with the Farm Produce Hall and 25 Market Place. The building underwent extensive refurbishment in mid‑2014 by Jonny Booth, Jamie Langrish and Rupert Hill, operators of several Manchester and Salford pubs.	
White Lion 53.4113°N 2.1584°W	Red-brick and black-and-white, timber-framed public house with a circular tower	Great Underbank, Underbank, SK1	1904	21 September 1993	II	1240653	A licensed inn has occupied the site since 1490, beginning with the White Horse, a coaching inn on the main route south from Manchester. The present pub opened in 1905 to designs by James Barritt Broadbent for Chesters Brewery; No. 20 was later incorporated into the premises. After closing in 2009 and standing vacant for 15 years, it was acquired by Stockport Council in 2015. The upper floors were converted into 11 apartments in 2020 under a council‑led scheme with Trafford Housing Trust, and further works enabled the renovation of the ground floor and basement, leading to the pub's reopening in 2024.	
The Alexandra 53.4020°N 2.1755°W	Red-brick and pale-stone public house	Northgate Road, Edgeley, SK3	1911	9 November 1994	II	1084337	Has been part of the Robinsons Brewery estate since 1949, following their acquisition of Bell & Co's Hempshaw Brook Brewery. CAMRA regards its largely intact early 20th‑century interior as of "outstanding national historic importance", awarding it a three‑star rating in its national inventory. Robinsons continues to hold the freehold as of May 2026.	
Swan with Two Necks 53.4120°N 2.1605°W	Black-and-white, timber-framed public house	Princes Street, Stockport, SK1	1920s or early 1930s	14 September 2007	II	1392243	Occupies a site used as a pub since about 1830, with the present building being rebuilt by Robinsons Brewery after their acquisition in 1924. A small rear room was incorporated into the customer areas in the 1960s. CAMRA rates the interior three stars for its "outstanding national historic importance". Refurbishment works in 2018 improved the exterior and rear boundary, creating an enclosed beer garden sheltered by an awning.	
Nursery Inn 53.4149°N 2.1769°W	Brick and rendered public house	Green Lane, Heaton Norris, SK4	1939	22 December 2011	II	1401250	Replaced a 19th‑century pub on the same site; its name is thought to derive from a former plant nursery nearby. It was CAMRA's National Pub of the Year in 2001 and is rated three stars for an interior of "outstanding national historic importance". Hydes Brewery currently operates the pub and carried out interior and exterior refurbishment in 2024. It was also one of the first headquarters of Stockport County F.C., then known as Heaton Norris Rovers, when the club's ground was nearby.	

== Tameside ==
Listed pubs in Tameside
Name	Image	Location, postcode district	Constructed	Date designated	Grade	Entry number	Notes	Refs.
Godley Hall Inn 53.4512°N 2.0516°W	Sandstone building	Godley Hill, Godley, SK14	1718	6 February 1986	II	1068082	Constructed as a house, the building was a pub by 1830. It closed in 2020, after which a local group sought asset-of-community-value status so they could buy it for community use, but they were unable to raise the necessary funds. It was subsequently sold to a developer, who secured planning permission in 2021 to convert it into a private dwelling. In 2023 the developer won an appeal against a refusal from Tameside Council, resulting in permission for a four‑bedroom house on the former car park.	
Stamford Arms 53.5090°N 2.0284°W	Stone public house	Huddersfield Road, Carrbrook, SK15	Mid-18th century	6 February 1986	II	1068012	Extended in the 19th century, it is shown as the Stamford Arms pub on the 1875 and 1935 Ordnance Survey maps. As of 2026, its freehold is owned by Thwaites Brewery.	
Colliers Arms 53.5203°N 2.0589°W	Sandstone building	Lily Lanes, Mossley, OL6	Late 18th century	9 July 1998	II	1375635	Altered in the 19th century, it stands on the hillside below the Grade II-listed Hartshead Pike Tower. It was in use as a pub by the time of the late 19th and early 20th‑century Ordnance Survey maps. According to CAMRA, the pub had closed by 2010 and was later converted to residential use.	
Gun Inn 53.4611°N 1.9963°W	Stone public house	Market Street, Hollingworth, SK14	1781	1 November 1966	II	1068062	Originally comprised three cottages and a pub that were later amalgamated. It underwent refurbishment in 2015, and as of 2025 its freehold is owned by Heineken UK. In 2016 a local group secured asset-of-community-value status to support a potential community bid, though no sale followed. The pub stands at a busy junction where routes divide towards the A628 Woodhead Pass and the A57 Snake Pass.	

== Trafford ==
Listed pubs in the Metropolitan Borough of Trafford
Name	Image	Location, postcode district	Constructed	Date designated	Grade	Entry number	Notes	Refs.
The Griffin 53.3781°N 2.3634°W	White-rendered public house	Stamford Road, Bowdon, WA14	Late 18th century	12 July 1985	II	1338520	Added to in the late 19th century, it appears on the 1877 Ordnance Survey map as an unnamed inn. As of 2025 its freehold remains with Greene King, and it is operated as part of the Chef & Brewer chain. It stands facing the Church of St Mary the Virgin, which is Grade II* listed.	
Orange Tree 53.3891°N 2.3507°W	White-rendered public house	Old Market Place, Altrincham, WA14	Late 18th century	29 January 2026	II	1495433	Originated as two houses, 13 and 15 Old Market Place, on a medieval burgage plot, the building was later adapted for commercial use. By the 1860s No. 15 was operating as a beerhouse, and the name Orange Tree was adopted around 1874 from a nearby pub demolished during street improvements. The two properties were amalgamated in the 1970s when the pub was expanded into No. 13. It traded for more than a century before closing in 2024, and a 2025 proposal to convert it into a restaurant with a ten-bed HMO above had not been determined by mid‑2026. It stands close to the Old Market Tavern.	
Old Market Tavern 53.3997°N 2.3527°W	White-rendered public house	Old Market Place, Altrincham, WA14	Early 19th century; 1849	12 July 1985	II	1067960	Formed from an early 19th‑century hotel and the adjoining 1849 former town hall, the combined building later entered commercial use and was incorporated into a pub complex. It was added to the Old Market Place conservation area in 1973. The pub was sold by Punch Taverns in 2017 and closed in February 2026; the freehold is held by Old Market Manchester Ltd. It stands close to the Orange Tree.	
The Railway 53.3997°N 2.3527°W	Red-purple-brick public house	Manchester Road, Broadheath, WA14	Mid-19th century	20 July 1993	II	1253114	Once formed part of a row of cottages on the A56, but these were demolished in 1996 for Altrincham Retail Park; its listed status kept it standing, now isolated at the edge of the car park. The interior, formerly on CAMRA's National Inventory, is graded three stars and regarded as of "outstanding national historic importance". The pub was an asset of community value from 2021 to 2026. A 2024 police raid led to a closure order and the later revocation of the premise's licence. As of June 2026, no update on its future has been published.	
Station Hotel 53.3872°N 2.3488°W	Red-brick public house	Stamford New Road, Altrincham, WA14	Late 19th century	27 April 1992	II	1346199	Received improvement works in 1929 by Charles Clegg and Son. The site became part of the Stamford New Road conservation area in 1987. The pub was formerly recorded by CAMRA as being owned by Scottish & Newcastle, but the company was dissolved in 2009; it is operated by Blind Tiger, though the current freeholder has not been confirmed. The building was refurbished in early 2026.	
The Sale 53.4174°N 2.3113°W	Red-brick public house with an octagonal tower	Marsland Road, Brooklands, M33	1878	13 January 2010	II	1393422	Originated as the Moorfield Hotel, it was later enlarged in 1905 with a purpose‑built billiard room. It appeared as the Sale Hotel on early Ordnance Survey maps and underwent significant interior alterations in the 1960s. The pub closed in 2009 amid plans for demolition, but a local campaign secured its listing. Greene King bought the site later that year and reopened it in 2011. It traded again from 2024 as The Sale, and the freehold remains with Greene King.	
The Volunteer 53.4285°N 2.3223°W	Red-brick and timber-framed public house in the Jacobethan style	Cross Street, Sale, M33	1897	8 February 2012	II	1401662	Built as the Volunteer Hotel for Chesters Brewery, the building replaced an earlier pub that had adopted the name The Volunteer in the early 19th century, a reference to a local volunteer defence unit raised in 1803. It saw various internal alterations in the mid‑20th century, including changes to the bar layout, the closure of one entrance and the end of hotel accommodation. It was refurbished in 2012 which highlighted its historic exterior. As of 2025, the freehold is owned by Joseph Holt's.	

== Wigan ==
Listed pubs in the Metropolitan Borough of Wigan
Name	Image	Location, postcode district	Constructed	Date designated	Grade	Entry number	Notes	Refs.
Boar's Head, Standish 53.5725°N 2.6405°W	White-plastered public house	Wigan Road, Standish, WN6	17th century (probable)	9 August 1966	II	1163139	Local tradition places the present building to around 1450, while other evidence suggests a 17th‑century date. A community plaque proposes that an earlier structure on the site may have served travellers on northern pilgrimage routes and records that the inn later functioned as a coaching stop on the early 19th‑century turnpike. CAMRA describes it as one of the oldest pubs in the Wigan area, and by 2024 the freehold was owned by Marston's.	
George and Dragon 53.4961°N 2.5190°W	Black‑and‑white timber‑framed public house	King Street, Leigh, WN7	Mid-17th century	18 October 1991	II	1261842	It underwent unrecorded alterations in the 19th and 20th centuries, with some modern ceiling beams in the bar area likely reflecting those later works. Ordnance Survey maps of 1893 and 1939 mark the premises without a name, while the 1907 edition identifies it as an inn. The pub received a major refurbishment in March 2012, and by April 2026 its freehold was held by Amber Taverns.	
Whitesmiths Arms 53.5495°N 2.6293°W	Rendered public house	Standishgate, Wigan, WN1	Late 17th century (probable)	11 July 1983	II	1384515	Originally a house and later enlarged and altered before its conversion into a pub. It is the oldest surviving burgage‑plot building in Wigan and among the oldest properties in the town centre. The premises traded for several years as the Casa Carlos tapas restaurant before the business relocated in 2019. In 2022 approval was granted for converting the upper‑floor flats into studio units while retaining the ground‑floor restaurant, followed in 2024 by consent for internal refurbishment and improvements to the outdoor areas. After these works, the building returned to pub use and reopened as the Whitesmiths Arms.	
Colliers Arms 53.5725°N 2.6405°W	Timber-framed public house	Wigan Road, Aspull, WN2	1700	9 June 1966	II	1356275	The year of construction is recorded on a datestone above the entrance. Early 20th‑century Ordnance Survey maps first show it without a designation and later as a pub, with the name "Colliers Arms" likely reflecting Aspull's coal-mining history, though its adoption is not documented. The pub reopened in November 2023 after a full refurbishment and is known locally as "The Stone", a name of uncertain origin. It stands near the Leeds and Liverpool Canal, with Haigh Country Park a short distance away.	
John Bull Chophouse 53.5461°N 2.6311°W	Painted-brick public house	Coopers Row, Wigan, WN1	17th or early 18th century (probable)	29 January 1998	II	1384460	The building may originally have comprised two cottages and a stable; it is also recorded as having served as a slaughterhouse, though the date is unknown. Ordnance Survey maps of 1894 and 1942 show the now‑combined structure as three separate domestic properties, indicating it was not then in use as a pub. In 2018 an upstairs pool room was refurbished and reopened as a craft‑ale bar called the Hop House, and as of March 2026 the freehold was held by Thwaites.	
Hesketh Arms 53.5903°N 2.6922°W	Black‑and‑white timber‑framed public house	Shevington Moor, Shevington, WN6	18th century	27 January 2010	II	1393531	It was later enlarged with an early 19th‑century assembly room and further extended in the later 19th and early 20th centuries. After closing in the late 2000s, the former pub was converted into a five‑bedroom house and the land to the rear developed for housing. In early 2026 a planning application was submitted to convert the building into a nursery, proposing the removal of several rear and front structures, a new rear porch, a first‑floor terrace, and associated external works; as of June 2026 no further update had been published.	
Royal Oak 53.5502°N 2.6283°W	Rendered public house	Standishgate, Wigan, WN1	Mid to late 18th century	17 November 1997	II	1384518	The building had an early addition on the left and was later enlarged and altered. Early 20th‑century Ordnance Survey maps mark it as a pub without an attributed name. As of November 2025, the freehold was held by the Inn The Bar group.	
Waterside Inn 53.4943°N 2.5216°W	Stone warehouse with brick addition	Canal Street, Leigh, WN7	Late 18th century, late 19th century (added)	27 July 1987	II	1068479	The building was originally a canal warehouse, with a brick extension added in the late 19th century. It later became part of the Leigh Bridge conservation area, designated in 1989, and was subsequently converted into a pub. It closed in 2020 before reopening in April 2024. As of May 2026, the freehold was held by Greene King.	
Lord Nelson Hotel 53.5903°N 2.6922°W	Rendered public house with decorative features	Bridge Street, Hindley, WN2	Late 18th century	24 September 1990	II	1393531	It was remodelled in the mid‑19th century, when the windows were replaced and decorative Victorian stucco panels were added. In 1989 the site became part of the newly designated Hindley Town Centre conservation area, and by 2024 the freehold was privately owned.	
Dog and Partridge 53.5456°N 2.6325°W	Red-brick public house	Wallgate, Wigan, WN1	Late 18th or early 19th century	11 July 1983	II	1384545	The building was reportedly known as the Dog and Partridge in its early history, though sources do not record when the name first came into use. After trading as the Bees Knees, it was renamed Last Orders before later reverting to Dog and Partridge. The pub stands adjacent to Wigan War Memorial in the churchyard of All Saints' Church, both of which are Grade II*‑listed.	
The Berkeley 53.5451°N 2.6322°W	Red-brick public house	Wallgate, Wigan, WN1	c. 1820	11 July 1983	II	1384546	A farm and malt kiln occupied the site in the mid‑18th century, but by 1791 an inn called The Thornton stood on the corner of King Street and Wallgate. Rebuilt around 1820 as a Georgian‑style inn, it later became known as the Minorca Hotel, a name sometimes linked to a Spanish refugee from the Napoleonic Wars. The Minorca was owned by the Wigan Brewery Company by 1843 and was acquired by Magee Marshall & Co when the brewery's estate was sold in 1894. The building was altered in 1857 to designs by Alfred Waterhouse and remodelled in 1968 by Berni Inns, which created two restaurants, four bars and a bier keller. By the 1980s it traded as Blair's and then Berkeley Square. As of 2025 the freehold was held by Amber Taverns, and the premises now trade as The Berkeley, though the date of this change is not recorded.	
The Mount 53.5394°N 2.6985°W	Sandstone public house with curved outer sections	Orrell Road, Orrell, WN5	Early 19th century	15 December 1977	II	1228430	Originally a house built for the colliery owner John Clarke. Between 1821 and 1835 it was occupied by a community of Benedictine nuns who had left France during the French Revolution; they ran a school in a neighbouring property before later relocating to Warwickshire. Early 20th‑century Ordnance Survey maps show the building first without a name and later as two properties labelled together as The Mount. The pub underwent refurbishment in 1986, and by 2024 it was operating as a Hungry Horse pub‑restaurant with its freehold owned by Greene King.	
Swan and Railway Hotel 53.5439°N 2.6339°W	Red-brick public house in a Scottish baronial style	Wallgate, Wigan, WN1	1898	27 June 1995	II	1384554	The building was designed by W. E. V. Crompton for Walkers of Warrington; in the same year he also designed the Clarence Hotel on Wallgate. The Swan and Railway stands beside the railway overbridge carrying the West Coast Main Line across Wallgate, close to Wigan North Western station. A serious fire in 1985 led to extensive reconstruction and replacement of fittings, and its interior is recognised by CAMRA with a one‑star rating for "special national historic importance". As of March 2026, the freehold was held by Union Inns, and the premises traded as both a pub and a hotel.	
Clarence Hotel 53.5451°N 2.6327°W	Red-brick public house in a Artisan Mannerist style	Wallgate, Wigan, WN1	1898	8 December 1999	II	1384550	It was designed by W. E. V. Crompton, who in the same year also designed the Swan and Railway Hotel on Wallgate. The pub has usually hosted the World Pie Eating Championship since its establishment in 1992. As of 2024, the freehold was held by Inn The Bar Group, and plans announced that year proposed reverting the trading name from Harry's Bar to the Clarence Hotel following refurbishment, though no further updates had appeared by April 2025.	
Boar's Head, Leigh 53.4982°N 2.5186°W	Red-brick public house in an Eclectic Baroque style	Market Place, Leigh, WN7	1900	9 July 1975	II	1163139	The pub was reportedly rebuilt in 1900 to designs by Christopher Simpson for the Leigh Brewery, replacing earlier buildings on the site, including the previous Boar's Head pub, and incorporating stables beneath a cartouche inscribed "Rebuilt 1900 AD". The original Market Place pub, known locally as the "Pig's Face", dated from the 18th century and served as the venue for the court leet of the Lords Lilford. In the 1970s Walkers Brewery sought to dispose of the pub, but local residents and the Leigh People's Paper intervened and it remained open. The interior is recognised by CAMRA with a one‑star rating for its historic importance. As of April 2026, the freehold was held by Benant Developments Ltd.	
Pagefield Hotel 53.5525°N 2.6436°W	—	Gidlow Lane, Wigan, WN6	1902	8 December 1999	II	1384467	The building was designed and built by Heaton, Ralph and Heaton for Magee Marshall & Co. CAMRA attributes its later name "Famous Pagefield" to a supposed visit by Queen Elizabeth, though no contemporary evidence links any of her visits to the building. The pub closed in early 2015, and an initial redevelopment proposal reported locally does not appear on the council's planning website. A more substantial scheme submitted in 2016 sought conversion to apartments alongside new housing on the former bowling green and was approved in 2018. In 2024 a further application proposed 19 mews houses on the bowling‑green site; as of June 2026, no update had been published.	
Springfield Hotel 53.5542°N 2.6478°W	Red-brick public house in a Free Renaissance style	Springfield Road, Wigan, WN6	1903	25 April 1990	II	1384512	It was designed by the local architects Heaton and Ralph for Oldfield Brewery, who also designed the Raven and Griffin hotels in the following years. Early 20th‑century Ordnance Survey maps show two large bowling greens to the rear; these were sold after the Second World War for housing, and the nearby cul de sac The Bowlings preserves their name. The interior is recognised by CAMRA with a three‑star rating for its "outstanding national historic importance". A 2023 planning application proposed hotel conversion of the upper floors and a rear extension; permission was granted in 2024, with no further update by June 2026. As of December 2024, the freehold was privately owned.	
Raven Hotel 53.5457°N 2.6318°W	Red-brick and sandstone public house in an Edwardian Baroque style	Wallgate, Wigan, WN1	1904	17 November 1997	II	1384541	The building was designed by the Wigan architects Heaton, Ralph and Heaton as a replacement for an earlier pub of the same name recorded in 1854; the same architects also designed the Springfield and Griffin hotels for the brewery in the surrounding years. Renovation work in 2012 retained and repaired original elements including tiling, internal panelling and windows. As of April 2026, the freehold was privately owned.	
Griffin Hotel 53.5497°N 2.6292°W	Red-brick public house in an Edwardian Baroque style	Standishgate, Wigan, WN1	1905	8 December 1999	II	1384517	It was designed by the architects Heaton and Ralph for Oldfield Brewery, who also designed the Springfield and Raven hotels in the preceding years. The Griffin was bought by Walker Cains in 1926, and Wigan Today has reported that it was once run by Billy Boston, though no dates are given. The pub closed in 2017 and later suffered arson attacks in 2022 and 2023. In 2025 it was added to the Buildings at Risk Register maintained by Save Britain's Heritage, and as of January 2026 its freehold was owned by Admiral Taverns.	

== Total listed pubs by borough ==
The table shows the total number of listed pubs by borough.

Total listed pubs by borough
Borough	Listed pubs
Bolton	13
Bury	7
Manchester	37
Oldham	9
Rochdale	11
Salford	16
Stockport	18
Tameside	4
Trafford	7
Wigan	19
Total	141

== See also ==
- Grade I listed buildings in Greater Manchester
- Grade II* listed buildings in Greater Manchester
- Grade II listed buildings in Manchester
- Scheduled monuments in Greater Manchester
