= Galloways Bakers =

Chain of bakers in the North-West of the United Kingdom

Galloways Bakers Limited
- Company type: Limited
- Industry: Food (Bakery Group)
- Founded: Wigan, England 1971; 55 years ago
- Headquarters: Wigan, United Kingdom
- Number of locations: 25
- Products: Pies, pastries and sandwiches; baked goods
- Website: Official website

Galloways Bakers is a British chain of bakers and pie shops, which is based in Wigan. It specialises in savoury baked products such as pies, pasties, barms and sweet items including confectionery and cream cakes. As of 2020, it has 25 stores across the North West region of England.

== History ==
Galloways Bakers was founded by Ronald and Patricia Galloway in 1971, it started from a single store in the Newtown area of Wigan, which was named The Pie Shop. By late 1970s the company had grown to four premises, and its name was eventually changed to Galloways Family Bakers. In 1989 it became a Limited Company, and throughout the 1990s and 2000s it expanded the number of stores across the North West. In 2017, the store introduced a special range of baked goods in support of Wigan Warriors reaching the Challenge Cup final.

In the early 2000s, the Galloways sold the business to a long-time employee who still owns the company over 20 years later.

During the COVID-19 pandemic, all of its 25 stores were shut for nearly two months due to the national lockdown. Starting in late May 2020 a phased reopening of its branches was brought in, after the company introduced social distancing measures to its shops.

In 2025, Galloways supplied the pies to the World Pie Eating Championship, these meat and potato pies are all cooked to strict regulations of 12 cm (5 in) in diameter with a depth of 3.5 cm (1.5 in).
