= Griffin Hotel, Wigan =

Listed former pub in Greater Manchester, England

Griffin Hotel
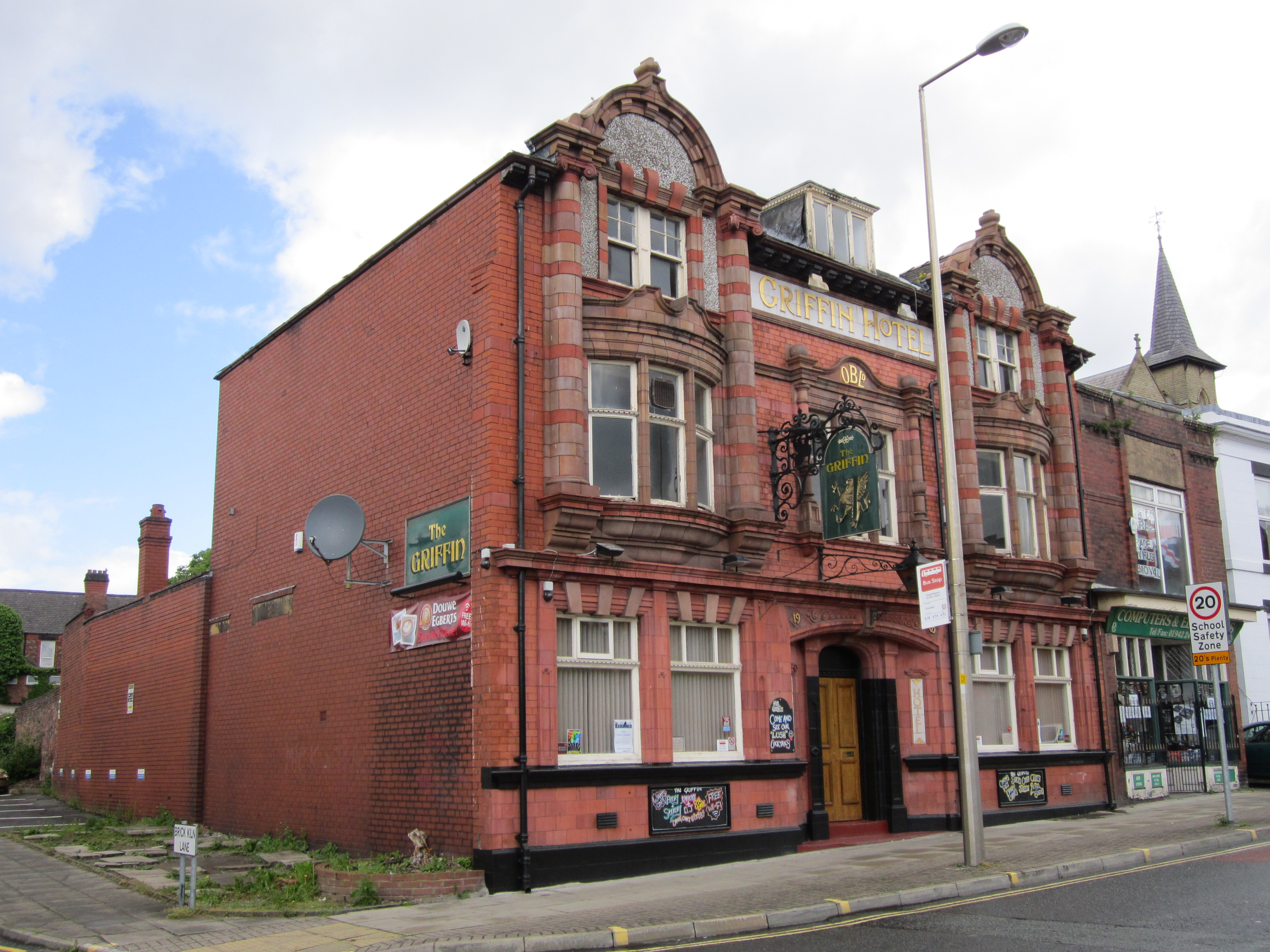
- The pub in 2013, before its closure in 2017

- Location within Greater Manchester
- Alternative names: The Griffin

General information
- Status: Derelict
- Type: Public house (former)
- Architectural style: Edwardian Baroque
- Location: 94 Standishgate, Wigan, Greater Manchester, England
- Coordinates: 53.5497°N 2.6292°W
- Year built: 1905; 121 years ago
- Closed: 2017
- Client: Oldfield Brewery
- Owner: Admiral Taverns

Design and construction
- Architects: Heaton and Ralph
- Designations

Listed Building – Grade II
- Official name: Griffin Hotel
- Designated: 8 December 1999
- Reference no.: 1384517

The Griffin Hotel is a Grade II listed former public house on Standishgate in Wigan, Greater Manchester, England. Built in 1905 for Oldfield Brewery to designs by the local architects Heaton and Ralph, it was later acquired by Walker Cains in 1926. The pub closed in 2017, suffered arson attacks in 2022 and 2023, and was added to the Buildings at Risk Register maintained by Save Britain's Heritage in June 2025. As of January 2026, its freehold was owned by Admiral Taverns.

== History ==
The building was constructed in 1905, according to its official listing, with the date shown on a doorway. It was designed for Oldfield Brewery by the Wigan architects Heaton and Ralph, who also designed the Springfield Hotel and the Raven Hotel, both in Wigan, for the brewery in 1903 and 1904, respectively. The 1908 and 1942 Ordnance Survey maps mark the building as a public house with no attributed name.

The Griffin Hotel was bought by Walker Cains in 1926. According to Wigan Today, the pub was once run by Welsh former professional rugby league footballer Billy Boston, although the report does not specify when he held that role. On 8 December 1999, the Griffin Hotel was designated a Grade II listed building.

The pub closed in 2017. It later suffered arson attacks in 2022 and 2023. In June 2025, the building was added to the Buildings at Risk Register maintained by Save Britain's Heritage, which is separate from Historic England's official Heritage at Risk Register. As of January 2026, the freehold was owned by Admiral Taverns.

== Architecture ==
The building is constructed of red brick in English garden wall bond with terracotta detailing and has a hipped slate roof. It has a double‑fronted plan with rooms arranged to the front and rear, and it is designed in an Edwardian Baroque style. The exterior has three storeys plus an attic and is arranged symmetrically in three bays.

The ground floor is finished with square tiles and a moulded cornice. The central bay contains a wide, angled entrance arch with the date "1905" set into the lintel, and inside this arch is a doorway framed by panelled pilasters. The outer bays each contain paired rectangular windows with decorative surrounds and plate‑glass panes. A wrought‑iron bracket with a lamp is fixed above the doorway.

On the first floor, the central bay has a three‑light window set within terracotta framing and a cornice bearing the initials "OB LD". To one side is a large wrought‑iron bracket supporting a signboard painted with a griffin, above which is a tiled frieze with the name "Griffin Hotel" and a prominent eaves cornice. A three‑light dormer sits above. The outer bays have curved three‑light oriel windows at first‑floor level and sash windows above.

== See also ==
- Listed buildings in Wigan
- Listed pubs in Greater Manchester
