= Swan and Railway Hotel =

Listed pub in Wigan, Greater Manchester, England

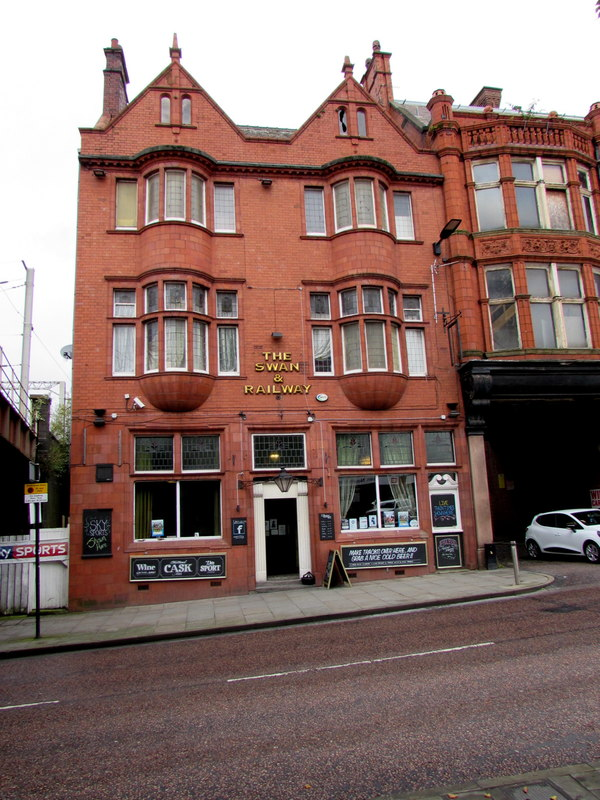
- The pub in 2017

- Location within Greater Manchester
- Alternative names: The Swan and Railway

General information
- Type: Public house
- Architectural style: Scottish baronial
- Location: 80 Wallgate, Wigan, Greater Manchester, England
- Coordinates: 53.5439°N 2.6339°W
- Year built: 1898; 128 years ago
- Client: Walkers of Warrington
- Owner: Union Inns

Design and construction
- Architect: W. E. V. Crompton
- Designations

Listed Building – Grade II
- Official name: The Swan and Railway Hotel
- Designated: 27 June 1995
- Reference no.: 1384554

Website
- swanandrailwayhotelwigan.co.uk

The Swan and Railway Hotel is a Grade II listed public house on Wallgate in Wigan, Greater Manchester, England. Built in 1898 for Walkers of Warrington to designs by W. E. V. Crompton, it was first operated as a hotel before later trading mainly as a pub, and now functions as both. The building stands beside the railway overbridge carrying the West Coast Main Line across Wallgate, close to Wigan North Western station. Its interior is recognised by the Campaign for Real Ale (CAMRA) with a one‑star rating for its "special national historic importance".

== History ==
The building was constructed in 1898, according to its official listing, and was designed by W. E. V. Crompton for Walkers of Warrington. In the same year he also designed the Clarence Hotel, another public house on Wallgate, although the client for that building is not recorded. The 1908 and 1942 Ordnance Survey maps mark the building as a public house with no attributed name.

In 1985 the building suffered a serious fire, leading to extensive reconstruction and replacement of fittings. On 27 June 1995, the Swan and Railway Hotel was designated a Grade II listed building. The interior is recognised by the Campaign for Real Ale (CAMRA) with a one‑star rating, indicating its status as of "special national historic importance". As of March 2026, the pub's freehold was owned by Union Inns, and the building was trading as both a pub and a hotel.

The Swan and Railway stands beside the railway overbridge carrying the West Coast Main Line across Wallgate, with Wigan North Western station lying to the south‑east.

== Architecture ==
=== Exterior ===
The building is constructed of red brick with terracotta detailing and has a green‑slate roof. It occupies a narrow rectangular plot set at right angles to the street and is designed in a Scottish baronial style.

It has three storeys with an attic and a two‑bay front. The upper floors feature a pair of tall, semicircular bay windows rising through two storeys, topped by a deep cornice and twin gables. The ground floor includes a wide entrance set slightly to the left, flanked by two‑light windows; the window on the right has a smaller doorway beside it. These openings have shaped surrounds and large glazed panels above, some containing stained glass.

The upper floors contain five‑light windows, with the bays having three lights each; those on the first floor include a horizontal division. The gables have paired narrow arched openings separated by decorative shafts that continue up to small finials. The windows throughout have small‑pane glazing.

=== Interior ===
The interior retains a number of original features. The porch has a mosaic floor bearing the name "Swan & Railway", and the entrance passage and rear hall are lined with decorative glazed tiles. The entrance lobby has tiled walls rising to the high ceiling, and the corridor beyond includes further tiled panels and mosaic flooring; some of the timberwork shows scorch marks from the fire.

Rooms leading off the corridor include lounges with original fixed seating, fireplaces and timber screens with stained glass. The bar serving the vault was largely refitted after the fire, although the fixed seating survives. Despite later alterations, the late‑Victorian layout remains broadly intact, though the high‑level glazing between the servery and corridor is a modern addition.

== See also ==
- Listed buildings in Wigan
- Listed pubs in Greater Manchester
