= Orange Tree =

Orange Tree or Orange Trees may refer to:

== Biology ==
- Citrus × sinensis, the species of tree that produces sweet oranges
- Mother Orange Tree, the oldest living orange tree in Northern California, U.S.

== Arts and entertainment ==
- Orange Tree Boys, the alter ego of the former English experimental rock band Black Midi
- My Sweet Orange Tree (film), a 2012 Brazilian drama film
- "Orange Trees", a song by Welsh singer and songwriter Marina
- "The Orange Tree", a poem by Australian poet John Shaw Neilson

== Buildings ==
- Orange Tree, Altrincham, a former pub in Greater Manchester, England
- Orange Tree Theatre, a theatre in Richmond, London, England

== Objects ==
- Bay Tree (Fabergé egg), also known as the Orange Tree egg

== Ships ==
- HMS Orange Tree, the name of three Royal Navy vessels

== Places ==
- Orangetree, Florida, a census-designated place in Collier County, Florida, U.S.
