= Old Town Hall, Altrincham =

Former municipal building in Greater Manchester, England

Old Town Hall
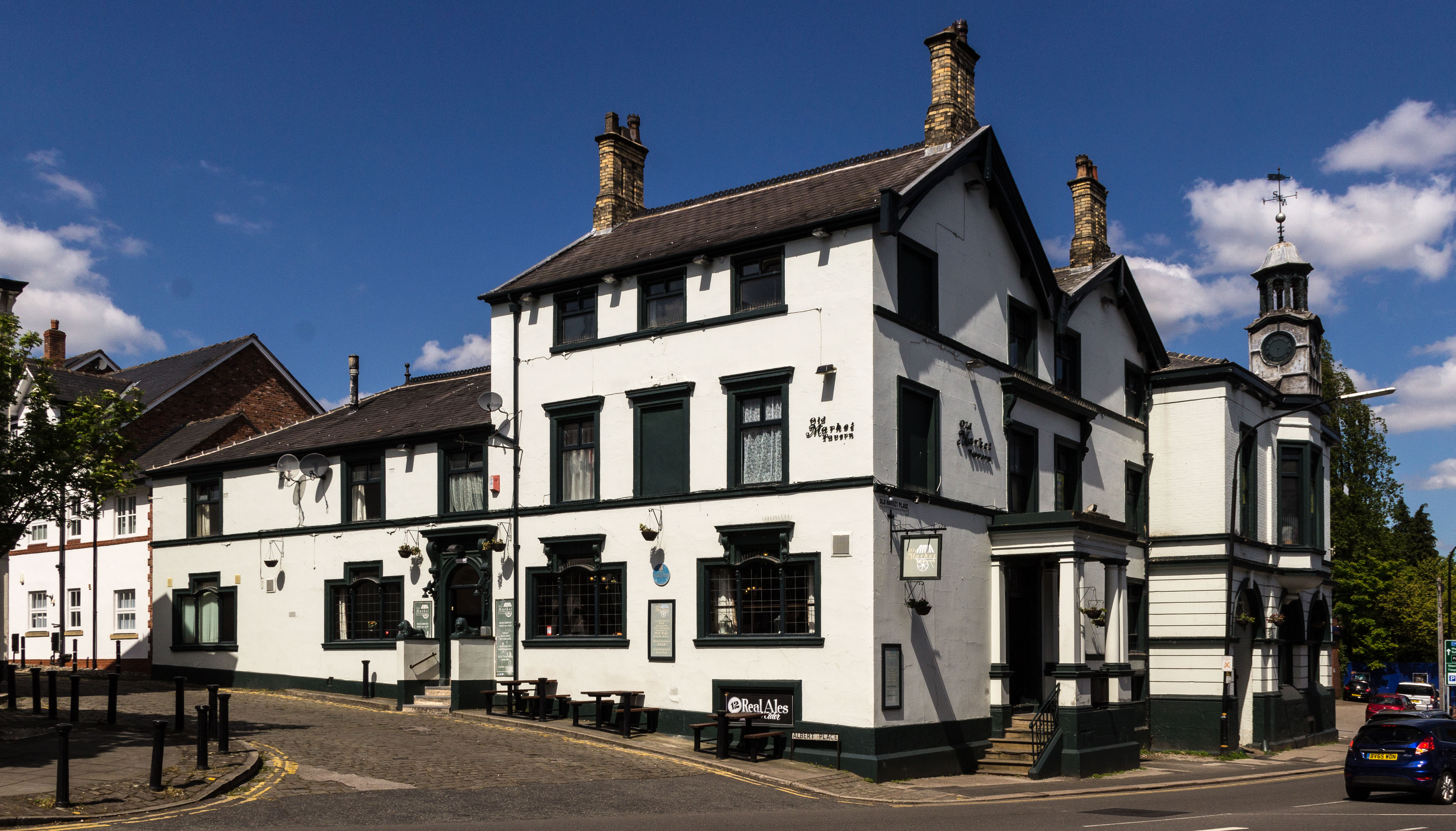
- Old Market Tavern in 2017, with the former town hall on the right

- Location within Greater Manchester
- Former names: Unicorn Hotel
- Alternative names: Old Market Tavern

General information
- Type: Hotel with town hall (former); public house (closed)
- Architectural style: Neoclassical
- Location: Old Market Place, Altrincham, Greater Manchester, England
- Coordinates: 53.3894°N 2.3505°W
- Years built: Early 19th century (hotel); 1849 (town hall)
- Closed: 2026
- Owner: Old Market Manchester Ltd

Design and construction
- Designations

Listed Building – Grade II
- Official name: Old Market Tavern
- Designated: 12 July 1985
- Reference no.: 1067960

The Old Town Hall is a Grade II listed former municipal building on Old Market Place in Altrincham, a market town in Trafford, Greater Manchester, England. The listing records the complex as an early 19th‑century hotel incorporating the former town hall of 1849, originally a separate civic building that served as the headquarters of the old borough of Altrincham until the late 19th century. After civic functions moved to a new town hall on Market Street, the two buildings passed into commercial use and were later absorbed into a public house, the Old Market Tavern, which has been closed since February 2026.

== History ==
The first town hall in Altrincham was a two-storey, six-sided building dating from the 17th century, which stood in the middle of Old Market Place. Also known as the Butter Market, it was erected in 1684 by Lord Delamer, the lord of the manor; the lower storey was open and furnished with seats "for the accommodation of parties bringing butter and other commodities to the market". The upper floor was used for meetings of the court leet and other civic gatherings. The building also contained the town lock-up, and nearby were a set of stocks.

The second town hall was a small neoclassical structure in the Old Market Place, built in brick with white stucco and completed in 1849, at which point the earlier building was demolished. It was commissioned by the Earl of Stamford, whose country seat was at Dunham Massey Hall, to serve as a town hall and market hall for the borough. The original borough of Altrincham was administered by a court leet, which met in the first-floor council chamber, until it was abolished under the Municipal Corporations Act 1883. The monthly Petty Sessions were also held here, while the market hall occupied the ground floor. The local volunteer fire brigade had space at the rear of the building for its manual fire engine.

Following significant industrial growth, particularly in Broadheath after Benjamin Tilghman established the town as the British centre of the sandblasting industry, Altrincham became an urban district in 1895. The new council then decided to erect a replacement town hall on Market Street. The Earl of Stamford subsequently sold the old town hall, together with the adjacent Unicorn Hotel, to Chester's Brewery Company.

In 1973 the site was included within the newly designated Old Market Place conservation area. On 12 July 1985, the building was designated a Grade II listed structure.

The complex, later known as the Old Market Tavern, was sold by Punch Taverns to an undisclosed buyer in 2017. The pub closed in February 2026 and is seeking new tenants. As of April 2026, the freehold was owned by Old Market Manchester Ltd. The Old Market Tavern stands in close proximity to another Grade II‑listed former pub, the Orange Tree.

== Architecture ==
The complex is built of brick with some rendered sections, stone detailing and slate roofs. It has three storeys, with a double‑gabled front facing east, a shorter frontage towards Market Place and a two‑storey wing to one side. The former town hall adjoins the north side; it projects slightly and has two storeys with three bays, including a carriage entrance below and a former council chamber above. The town hall was described as "a handsome brick structure with rusticated stone-work facings".

Many of the former hotel's external features were added in the late 19th century, including its plinth, window bands, decorative cornice, bargeboards, brick chimneys and a flat porch with columns and a heraldic shield. Earlier work is simpler, with a series of window openings, some now blocked, and a doorway with an overlight that remains. The Market Place side was also embellished in the late 19th century and has stepped ground‑floor windows and further openings above, now fitted with casements.

The design of the old town hall involved a symmetrical three‑bay front facing Old Market Place, with a carriage entrance in the left bay and round‑headed windows in the other two. The slightly projecting central bay carried an oriel window on the first floor and a clock tower with a bellcote and weather vane above. The clock was by Peter Clare of Quay Street, Manchester. The bell from the old Butter Market, cast in Little Budworth and given by Henry, Lord Delamer, in 1684, was installed in the bellcote and used both to strike the hours and to sound an alarm in the event of a fire. Tall first‑floor window openings flank the oriel, and the roof is hipped.

== See also ==
- Listed buildings in Altrincham
- Listed pubs in Greater Manchester
