= Lamb Hotel, Eccles =

Pub in Salford, England

Lamb Hotel
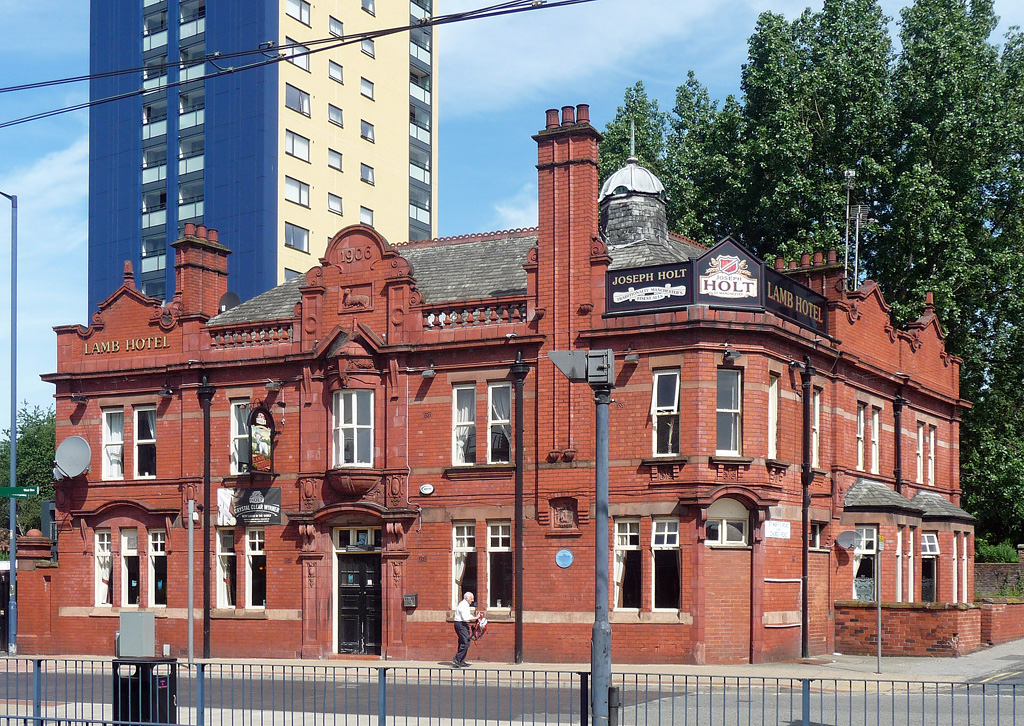
- The pub in 2017

- Location within Greater Manchester

General information
- Type: Public house
- Architectural style: Eclectic
- Location: 33 Regent Street, Eccles, Greater Manchester, England
- Coordinates: 53.4835°N 2.3334°W
- Year built: 1906; 120 years ago
- Owner: Joseph Holt's

Design and construction
- Architect: Mr Newton
- Architecture firm: Hartley, Hacking & Co
- Designations

Listed Building – Grade II
- Official name: Lamb Hotel
- Designated: 15 April 1994
- Reference no.: 1084301

Website
- Official website

The Lamb Hotel is a Grade II listed public house on Regent Street in Eccles, a market town in the City of Salford, England. Built in 1906 in an Eclectic style for Joseph Holt's Brewery, it remains a Holt's pub and is regarded by the Campaign for Real Ale (CAMRA) as having an interior of "outstanding national historic importance".

== History ==
The Lamb Hotel was constructed in 1906 by Mr Newton of the architectural practice Hartley, Hacking & Co. for Joseph Holt's Brewery, and is one of three pubs in Eccles designed for the brewery by the firm between 1903 and 1906, together with the Grapes Hotel and the Royal Oak.

On 15 April 1994, the Lamb Hotel was designated a Grade II listed building. It was formerly included on the Campaign for Real Ale (CAMRA)'s National Inventory of Historic Pub Interiors before the system was revised. Under CAMRA's new grading scheme, it is now rated three stars and its interior is regarded as being of "outstanding national historic importance". The Lamb Hotel has remained in Holt's ownership since it opened, and has continued to form part of the brewery's tied estate for more than a century.

== Architecture ==
The building is constructed in red brick with matching terracotta and sandstone detailing, and has a slate roof with red ridge pieces and a small lead‑covered dome. Its footprint is an irregular four‑sided shape suited to its corner plot, and the design is an ecclectic mix of elements. It has two storeys and five bays, with a decorative band below the roofline and a parapet of shaped gables linked by short balustrades. A tall channelled chimney stands in the fourth bay.

The central bay contains the main doorway, framed in terracotta and topped by a curved canopy on paired brackets. Above it is a narrow projecting first‑floor window with a small dome and a broken pediment. Higher up, a raised panel with a lamb motif leads to another curved pediment carrying the date 1906.

Elsewhere, both floors have narrow sash windows; those on the ground floor include small upper panes and patterned lower glass. The angled corner to the right includes a former vault entrance that is now closed, and the right‑hand return has another blocked doorway that once served the outdoor department.

=== Interior ===
The interior keeps much of its original layout and fittings. The entrance lobby has a doorway on the right leading to the vault, and straight ahead a carved mahogany screen with glazed panels and a door bearing etched glass with the name "Lamb Hotel". The hall is lined with light and dark green tiles in an Art Nouveau style with red rose motifs, and this finish continues up the staircase. The stair itself is a heavy mahogany design influenced by Jacobean work, and the bar has a curved front with decorative cut‑glass hatches and overlights.

Doorways into the rooms have detailed surrounds in a Jacobean manner, and the doors carry etched glass with room names such as "Bar Parlour" and "Billiard Room". The rooms include fixed upholstered seating, bell pushes, lobby screens and fireplaces in a similar style. In the billiard room, the seating is arranged on raised platforms around the walls. The vault contains fixed seating with matchboard backs, and this space has been altered to absorb the former outdoor department.

== See also ==
- Listed buildings in Eccles, Greater Manchester
- Listed pubs in Greater Manchester
