= Royal Oak, Eccles =

Listed former pub in Greater Manchester, England

Royal Oak
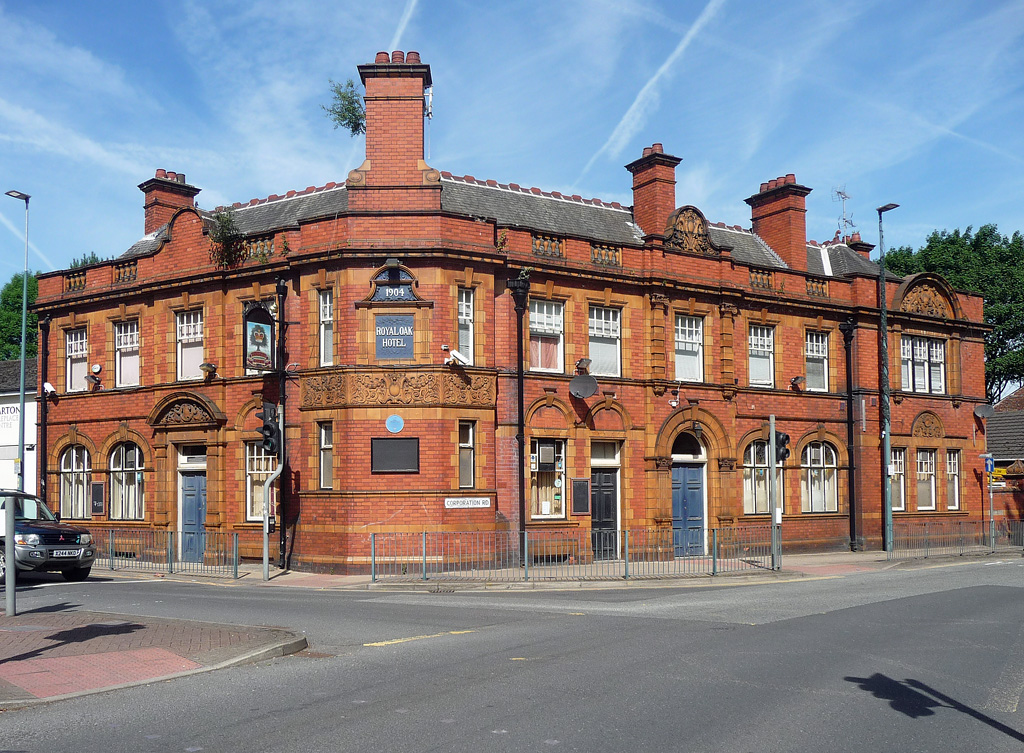
- The former pub in 2017

- Location within Greater Manchester

General information
- Status: Converted to residential use
- Type: Public house (former)
- Architectural style: Edwardian Baroque
- Location: 34 Barton Lane, Eccles, Greater Manchester, England
- Coordinates: 53.4820°N 2.3404°W
- Year built: 1904; 122 years ago
- Closed: 2016 (as a pub)
- Client: Joseph Holt's

Design and construction
- Architect: Mr Newton
- Architecture firm: Hartley, Hacking & Co.
- Designations

Listed Building – Grade II
- Official name: Royal Oak public house
- Designated: 15 April 1994
- Reference no.: 1346234

The Royal Oak is a Grade II listed former public house on Barton Lane in Eccles, a market town in the City of Salford, England. Built in 1904 in an Edwardian Baroque style for Joseph Holt's Brewery, it closed in 2016 and was subsequently converted to residential use.

== History ==
The Royal Oak was constructed in 1904 by Mr Newton of the architectural practice Hartley, Hacking & Co. for Joseph Holt's Brewery, and is one of three pubs in Eccles designed for the brewery by the firm between 1903 and 1906, together with the Grapes Hotel and the Lamb Hotel.

On 15 April 1994, the Royal Oak was designated a Grade II listed building. It was formerly included on the Campaign for Real Ale (CAMRA)'s National Inventory of Historic Pub Interiors. The pub closed its doors in September 2016 and was sold to private owners. Planning permission to convert it into housing was granted by Salford City Council in December 2017.

== Architecture ==
The building is constructed in red brick with pale terracotta detailing and has a slate roof that slopes down on the right-hand side. Its footprint is an irregular four‑sided shape suited to its corner position, and the design follows an Edwardian Baroque approach. It has two floors above cellars, five bays, and a chamfered corner on the right from which the chimney rises. A decorative terracotta cornice runs below a brick parapet.

The main doorway is in the third bay and is framed in terracotta with a curved pediment above. The windows are sashes with terracotta surrounds; two on the ground floor to the left have gently arched heads. The angled corner includes a broad terracotta band between the floors and, at first‑floor level, a plaque reading "Royal Oak / Hotel" with the year 1904.

The long right-hand elevation has six windows in the same style, an entrance to the former outdoor department in the second bay, and another doorway with a round arch in the third. A wider end bay contains a three‑part first‑floor window beneath a curved terracotta pediment. The site also includes a boundary wall with gate piers topped by terracotta finials and a small stable building in the yard.

== See also ==
- Listed buildings in Eccles, Greater Manchester
- Listed pubs in Greater Manchester
