= Clarence Hotel, Wigan =

Listed pub in Greater Manchester, England

Clarence Hotel
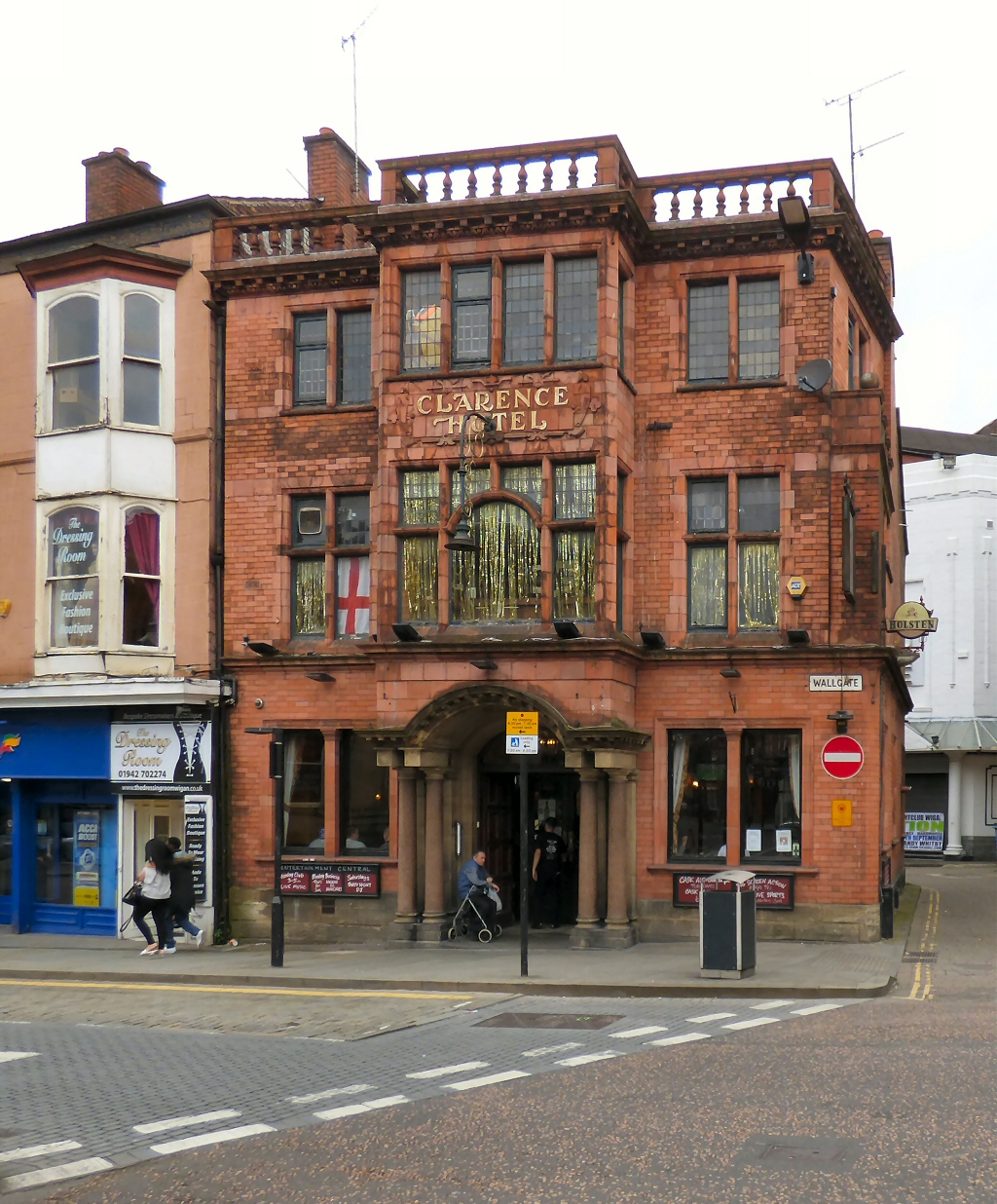
- The pub in 2016

- Location within Greater Manchester
- Alternative names: Harry's Bar

General information
- Type: Public house
- Architectural style: Artisan Mannerist
- Location: 40 Wallgate, Wigan, Greater Manchester, England
- Coordinates: 53.5451°N 2.6327°W
- Year built: 1898; 128 years ago
- Owner: Inn The Bar Group

Design and construction
- Architect: W. E. V. Crompton
- Designations

Listed Building – Grade II
- Official name: The Clarence Hotel
- Designated: 8 December 1999
- Reference no.: 1384550

Website
- harrysbarwigan.com

The Clarence Hotel, which currently trades as Harry's Bar, is a Grade II listed public house on Wallgate in Wigan, Greater Manchester, England. Built in 1898 and designed by W. E. V. Crompton, it has served both as a hotel and a pub and is closely associated with the World Pie Eating Championship, which has usually been held there since its establishment in 1992. In 2024 the owners announced plans to refurbish the building and restore its original name, though no further updates had appeared by April 2025; proposals for apartments on the upper floors have also been reported, but no corresponding planning application is available on Wigan Council's website as of September 2026.

== History ==
The building was constructed in 1898, according to its official listing, and was designed by W. E. V. Crompton, who also designed the Swan and Railway Hotel, another public house on Wallgate, in the same year. The 1908 and 1942 Ordnance Survey maps mark the building as a hotel with no attributed name.

The pub has usually been the venue for the World Pie Eating Championship, an annual event established in 1992. On 8 December 1999, the Clarence Hotel was designated a Grade II listed building. As of 2024, the pub's freehold is owned by Inn The Bar Group, and plans announced later that year proposed reverting the pub's name to its original form, the Clarence Hotel, following refurbishment; however, no subsequent reporting had appeared by April 2025. Planning permission was reportedly granted for the creation of apartments on the upper floors of the building, but there does not appear to be any corresponding planning application on Wigan Council's website, and no reference number has been cited in published reports as of September 2026.

== Architecture ==
The building is constructed of red brick with terracotta detailing in an Artisan Mannerist style, and has a slate roof hidden behind a parapet. It has a symmetrical front with three storeys and three bays, with the middle section projecting slightly. A porch stands at the centre, supported by pairs of polished granite columns and covered by a curved canopy, leading to double entrance doors. Above this are tall windows on the first and second floors, including a Venetian‑style window and a terracotta panel bearing the name "Clarence Hotel". The outer bays contain a series of two‑light and cross‑windows arranged across the three floors. A long rear extension follows the curve of the plot.

Inside, a porch leads into a long main room lined with tiles and timber panelling, with two smaller rooms at the front overlooking the street. A large internal staircase remains, although it is no longer in use.

== See also ==
- Listed buildings in Wigan
- Listed pubs in Greater Manchester
