= Raven Hotel =

Listed pub in Wigan, Greater Manchester, England

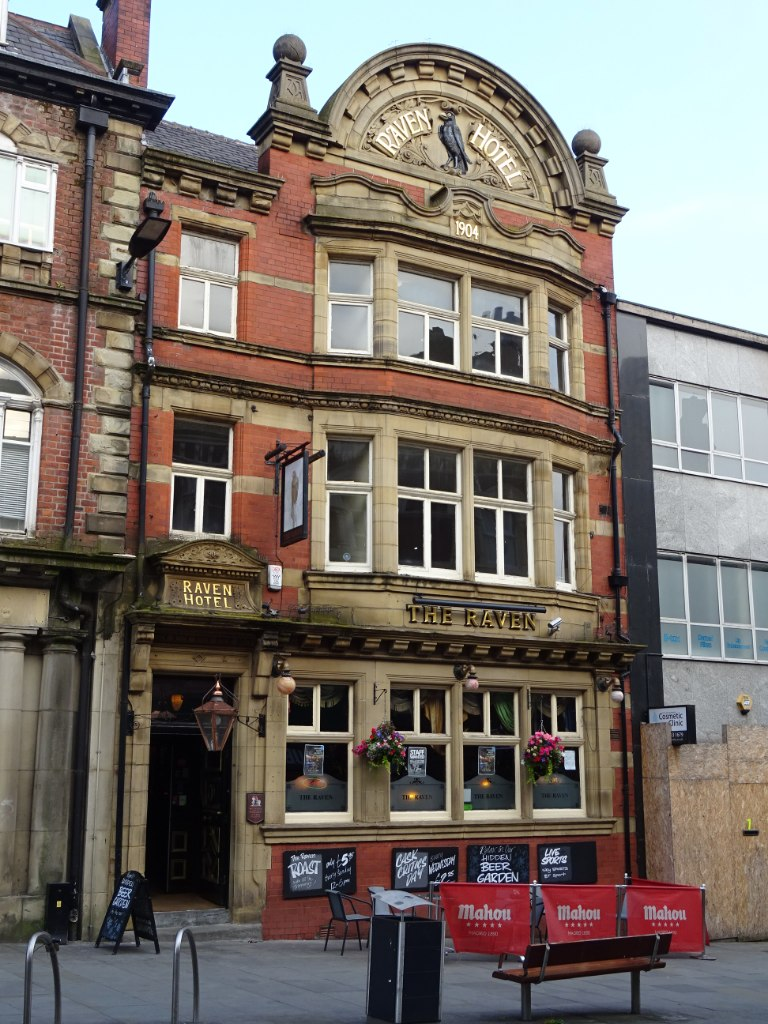
- The pub in 2019

- Location within Greater Manchester
- Alternative names: The Raven

General information
- Type: Public house
- Architectural style: Edwardian Baroque
- Location: 5 Wallgate, Wigan, Greater Manchester, England
- Coordinates: 53.5457°N 2.6318°W
- Year built: 1904; 122 years ago
- Renovated: 2012

Design and construction
- Architects: Heaton, Ralph and Heaton
- Designations

Listed Building – Grade II
- Official name: The Raven Hotel
- Designated: 17 November 1997
- Reference no.: 1384541

The Raven Hotel (currently trading as The Raven) is a Grade II listed public house on Wallgate in Wigan, Greater Manchester, England. Built in 1904 to designs by Heaton, Ralph and Heaton as a replacement for an earlier pub of the same name, it retains a number of original interior features recognised in its listing. The building was renovated in 2012, and as of April 2026 its freehold remained in private ownership.

== History ==
The building was constructed in 1904, according to its official listing, a date also shown on its second floor. It was designed by the Wigan architects Heaton, Ralph and Heaton as a replacement for an earlier public house of the same name that was trading in 1854. The same architects also designed the Springfield Hotel and the Griffin Hotel, both in Wigan, for the brewery in 1903 and 1905, respectively. The 1908 and 1942 Ordnance Survey maps mark the building as a public house, with no attributed name.

On 17 November 1997, the Raven Hotel was designated a Grade II listed building. Renovation work in 2012 retained and repaired a number of original elements, such as the tiling, internal panelling and windows. As of April 2026, the pub's freehold was privately owned.

== Architecture ==
=== Exterior ===
The building is constructed of red brick with stone detailing and has a slate roof. It has a long, narrow footprint set at right angles to the street and was designed in an Edwardian Baroque style. The front has three storeys above cellars and two bays of very different widths. The ground floor is marked by a horizontal band, with another band above the second floor, and the roofline is finished with a shaped parapet carrying the date "1904". Above this is a large curved feature containing a painted raven and the name "Raven Hotel", with ball finials at each side. The entrance is on the left, set beneath a curved panel with the building's name, and to the right is a wide four‑part window, both framed in stone. The upper floors have a single window above the doorway and, in the wider bay, a tall canted oriel window rising through two storeys with stone and timber framing and a moulded top.

=== Interior ===
Inside, the walls are lined with pale green glazed tiles featuring stylised plant motifs, and the bar and internal partitions are finished in mahogany, although some sections have been altered or removed. The staircase is designed in a Jacobean style.

== See also ==
- Listed buildings in Wigan
- Listed pubs in Greater Manchester
