= Springfield Hotel =

Listed pub in Wigan, Greater Manchester, England

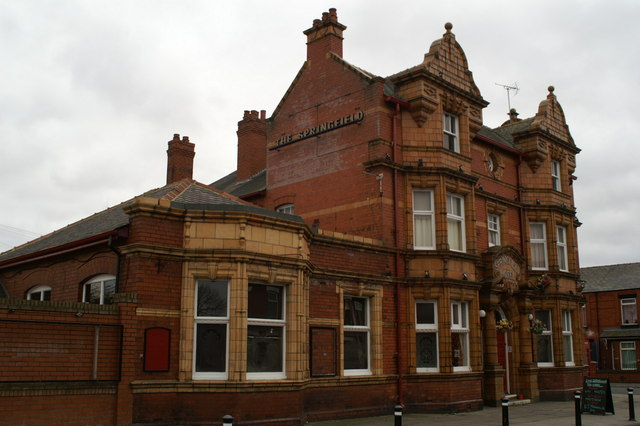
- The pub in 2009

- Location within Greater Manchester
- Alternative names: The Springfield

General information
- Type: Public house
- Architectural style: Free Renaissance
- Location: 47 Springfield Road, Wigan, Greater Manchester, England
- Coordinates: 53.5542°N 2.6478°W
- Year built: 1903; 123 years ago
- Client: Oldfield Brewery

Design and construction
- Architects: Heaton and Ralph
- Designations

Listed Building – Grade II
- Official name: The Springfield public house
- Designated: 25 April 1990
- Reference no.: 1384512

The Springfield Hotel is a Grade II listed public house on Springfield Road in Wigan, Greater Manchester, England. Built in 1903 for Oldfield Brewery to designs by the local architects Heaton and Ralph, it retains a largely intact interior, which is recognised by the Campaign for Real Ale (CAMRA) with a three‑star rating for its "outstanding national historic importance". The site formerly included two large bowling greens with spectator stands, sold after the Second World War for housing, and commemorated today by the nearby cul de sac The Bowlings.

== History ==
The building was constructed in 1903, according to its official listing. It was designed for Oldfield Brewery by the Wigan architects Heaton and Ralph, who also designed the Raven Hotel and the Griffin Hotel, both in Wigan, for the brewery in 1904 and 1905, respectively. The 1909 and 1942 Ordnance Survey maps mark the building as the Springfield Hotel, with the latter edition showing two bowling greens to the rear. The greens were sold after the Second World War for the construction of a housing estate. The greens had spectator stands that could hold around 2,000 people, and a nearby cul de sac is still named The Bowlings in reference to them.

On 25 April 1990, the Springfield Hotel was designated a Grade II listed building. The interior is included in the Campaign for Real Ale (CAMRA)'s National Inventory of Historic Pub Interiors and has a three‑star rating, denoting "outstanding national historic importance". The pub was sold by Punch Taverns in 2012.

In December 2023, a planning application and accompanying listed building consent was submitted to Wigan Council seeking to change the building from a pub with living accommodation to a mixed‑use layout, with the pub remaining on the ground floor and the upper floors converted into a hotel. The proposal also included a single‑storey rear extension to provide additional kitchen and toilet space, along with external alterations such as creating a parking area. Permission was granted in November 2024. The pub reopened in February 2026 following refurbishment works. By March 2026, further improvements were underway, including the renovation of its function room and rear beer garden. The pub's freehold was privately owned as of August 2026.

== Architecture ==
=== Exterior ===
The building is constructed of red brick with decorative terracotta and faience details, and it has slate roofs. It occupies a corner plot with an L‑shaped layout and includes an additional wing on the left. The design uses a Free Renaissance style and is arranged to make a visual feature at the corner with Rylands Street.

The main section has three storeys and three bays arranged symmetrically. On either side of the entrance are full‑height bay windows that project outward and rise to shaped gables. The entrance is framed by large Ionic columns and an arched opening with prominent stonework, above which is a panel showing the building's name and date, topped by a curved pediment. A single window sits above the doorway on each floor, with a round window at the top.

The projecting bays have decorative window surrounds. At ground level, the glazing is etched with the names "News Room" and "Commercial Room". The upper windows are sash windows with small glazing bars in the upper sections. The gables are heavily detailed.

To the left is a single‑storey billiard room with a projecting bay window and a hipped roof. The right‑hand side, facing Rylands Street, has two parts: one section is three storeys with two windows, a shaped gable on one side, and a small turret with a lead‑covered top on the other; the other section is two storeys with two windows and a bay window at ground level. The roof includes a dormer window with four lights and dentil detailing.

=== Interior ===
The interior is largely unchanged and retains many of its original fittings. The main entrance opens into a large lobby used for drinking, where the original bar screen survives with its columns, glazed panels and decorative detailing. The central bar counter is highly ornamented, with shaped uprights, patterned panels below and open shelving above. The lobby also keeps its tiled dado, and there are original door surrounds, glazed partitions and fireplaces with tiled surrounds and mirrored overmantels. The rooms retain their decorative cornices.

To the right of the Rylands Street entrance is a very small public bar with a later counter designed to echo the one in the lobby. On either side of the main doorway are two rooms: the one on the right, known as the Commercial Room, has a small timber porch at its entrance, while the room on the left has been opened through to a space behind it and connects to the lobby through a wide arch that appears to be original. A further room lies beyond this and now links to the lobby through a modern opening.

At the rear is a large billiard room, now used as a function space. It is a later addition, and its plain ceiling and simple etched glazing reflect the more restrained decorative tastes of the early 20th century.

== See also ==
- Listed buildings in Wigan
- Listed pubs in Greater Manchester
