= Peter Walker (brewer) =

Brewer (died 1879)

Peter Walker (died 1879) was the owner and master brewer of the Fort Brewery in Ayr, Scotland.

== Career ==
Walker established the Fort Brewery in Ayr, Scotland in 1817. He moved to Liverpool in 1836 and established a new brewery in Everton. He moved again, this time to Warrington, in 1846, acquired Pemberton's Brewery there and, having admitted his son Andrew to the business, started trading as Peter Walker & Son. He retired in 1873.
