= The Grapes, Eccles =

Listed pub in Greater Manchester, England

The Grapes
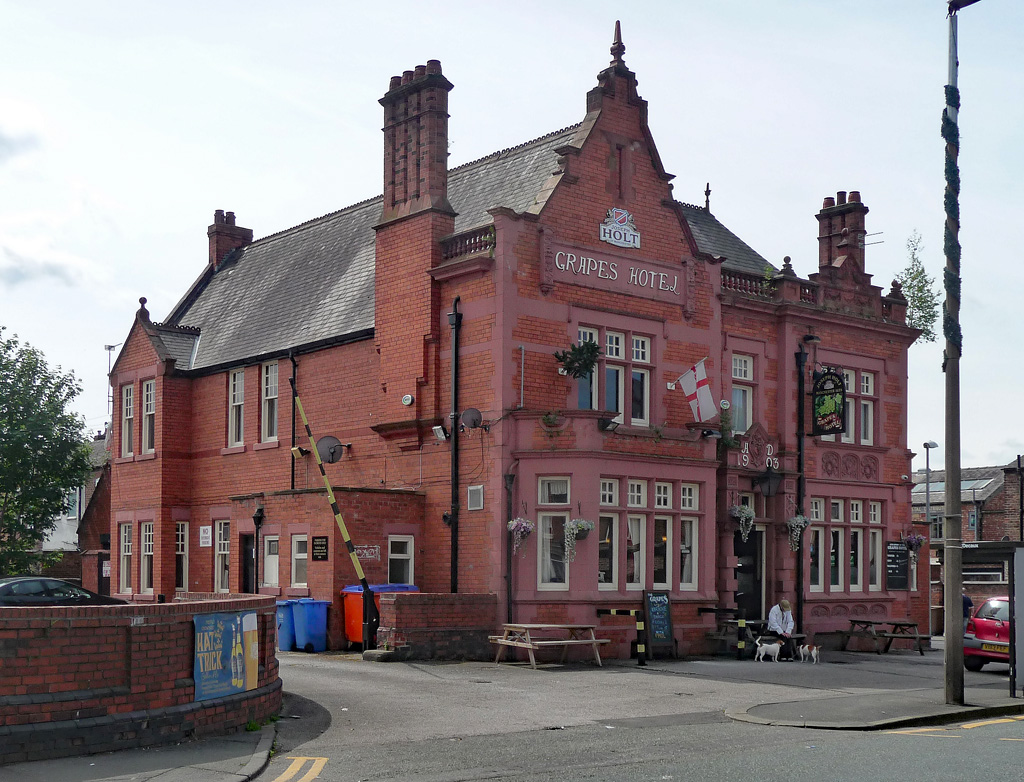
- The pub in 2017

- Location within Greater Manchester

General information
- Type: Public house
- Architectural style: Jacobethan
- Location: 439 Liverpool Road, Peel Green, Eccles, Greater Manchester, England
- Coordinates: 53.4788°N 2.3642°W
- Year built: 1903; 123 years ago
- Owner: Joseph Holt's

Design and construction
- Architect: Mr Newton
- Architecture firm: Hartley, Hacking & Co.
- Designations

Listed Building – Grade II
- Official name: Grapes Hotel
- Designated: 15 April 1994
- Reference no.: 1084300

Website
- Official website

The Grapes (officially listed as the Grapes Hotel) is a Grade II listed public house on Liverpool Road in the Peel Green suburb of Eccles, a market town in the City of Salford, England. Built in 1903 in the Jacobethan style for Joseph Holt's Brewery, it remains a Holt's pub and is regarded by the Campaign for Real Ale (CAMRA) as having an interior of "outstanding national historic importance".

== History ==
The Grapes Hotel was constructed in 1903 by Mr Newton of the architectural practice Hartley, Hacking & Co. for Joseph Holt's Brewery, and is one of three pubs in Eccles designed for the brewery by the firm between 1903 and 1906, together with the Royal Oak and the Lamb Hotel.

On 15 April 1994, the Grapes Hotel was designated a Grade II listed building. It was included on the Campaign for Real Ale (CAMRA)'s National Inventory of Historic Pub Interiors before the inventory's grading system was revised. Under the revised scheme, it is rated three stars and its interior is regarded as being "of outstanding national historic importance".

The Grapes has remained in Holt's ownership since it opened, and has continued to form part of the brewery's tied estate for more than a century. A separate pub, also called The Grapes, is located on Church Street, approximately 1.3 miles (2.1 km) away.

== Architecture ==
=== Exterior ===
The building is constructed of red brick with terracotta detailing and has a slate roof with red ridge tiles. It occupies a rectangular corner plot and is designed in a Jacobean‑influenced style. It has two storeys and cellars, arranged in four bays of differing widths, with a gabled bay on the left and an angled corner on the right. The windows are divided by stone or terracotta elements, and the ground floor of the gabled bay contains a projecting canted window. The second bay is narrow and set back slightly, with an entrance porch in a Jacobean style that includes a parapet bearing a shield dated 1903. The third bay contains a wide window with decorative terracotta panels above. The angled corner includes an entrance to the former vault, also treated in a Jacobean manner. The right‑hand side continues in the same style and includes a later flat‑roofed extension and a broad canted window lighting the former billiard room at the rear.

=== Interior ===
The interior follows its original layout with some later changes, and several early features remain. The entrance lobby has a doorway to the former vault on the right, and ahead is a mahogany screen with glazed panels and a door bearing etched vine motifs and the name "Grapes Hotel". The hall is lined with green glazed tiles in an Art Nouveau style, which continue up the staircase, and the stair itself is a detailed mahogany design in a Jacobean style. The bar includes decorative glass hatches and overlights.

Most rooms retain Jacobean‑style door surrounds, etched glass panels with room names such as "Bar Parlour" and "Smoke Room", lobby screens, fireplaces in a similar style, and some original fixed seating, although the smoke room has been altered. The former billiard room has raised seating platforms and a Jacobean‑style fireplace. The vault contains simple fixed seating and a panelled lobby with another etched‑glass internal door. Upstairs, a meeting room remains with exposed roof timbers and an original fireplace.

== See also ==
- Listed buildings in Eccles, Greater Manchester
- Listed pubs in Greater Manchester
