= Meat and potato pie =

English pie dish

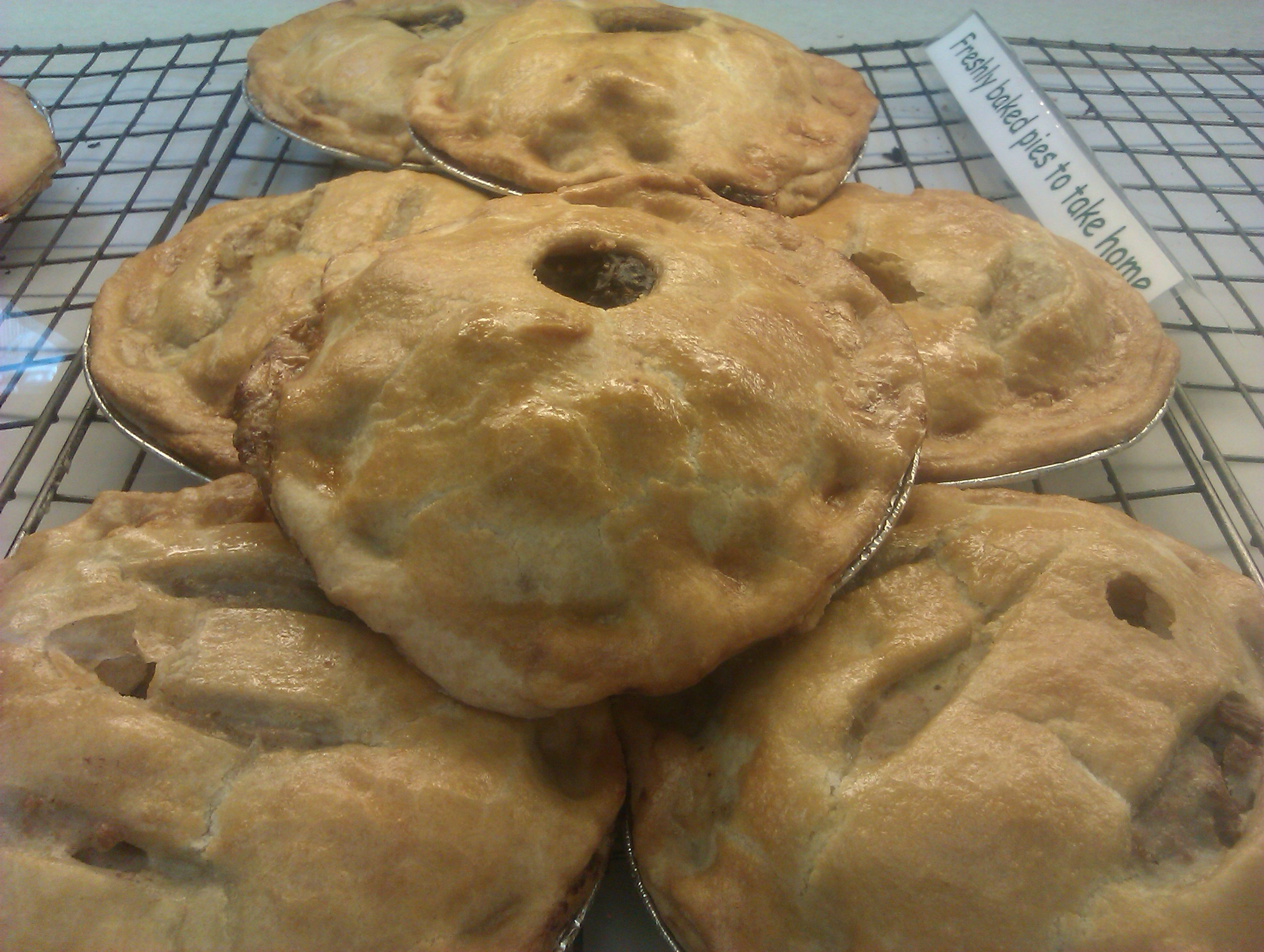
- A rack of homemade meat and potato pies
- Type: Savoury pie
- Place of origin: England
- Region or state: Staffordshire, Cheshire, Yorkshire, Lancashire, Cumberland and Westmorland
- Main ingredients: Pastry shell, potatoes, lamb or beef, carrots, onions

Meat and potato pie is a popular variety of pie eaten in England. Meat and potato pie comes in many versions and consists of a pastry casing containing: potato, either lamb or beef, and sometimes carrot and/or onion. It is often steak and kidney with a layer of potatoes. They can often be bought in a speciality pie shop, a type of bakery concentrating on pies, or in a chip shop. A meat and potato pie has a similar filling to a Cornish pasty and differs from a meat pie in that its content is usually less than 50% meat. They can be typically eaten as take-aways but are a homemade staple in many homes.

In 2004, ITV's The Paul O'Grady Show voted the produce of The Denby Dale Pie Company as the UK's best Meat and Potato Pie.

In 2017, Martin Appleton-Clare set a new speed eating record at the World Pie Eating Championship in Wigan, Greater Manchester. Appleton-Clare retained his title, by finishing the meat and potato pie in 32 seconds.

== Ingredients ==
=== For the pie filling ===
- Braising steak
- Onions
- potatoes
- Beef extract
- Gravy granules

=== For the pastry ===
- Plain flour
- Salt
- Margarine
- Lard
- Water
- Egg

== See also ==
- List of pies, tarts and flans
- List of potato dishes
- List of meat and potato dishes
