= Orange Tree, Altrincham =

Listed former pub in Greater Manchester, England

Orange Tree
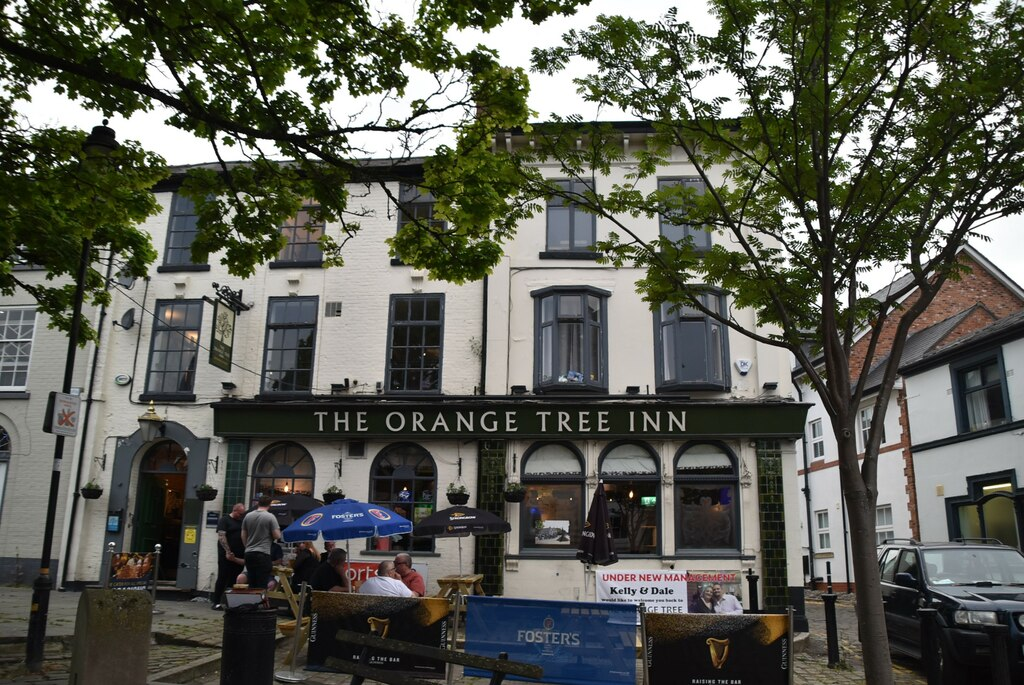
- The pub in 2022, before its closure in 2024

- Location within Greater Manchester
- Alternative names: Orange Tree Inn

General information
- Status: Vacant
- Type: Public house (former)
- Location: 15 Old Market Place, Altrincham, Greater Manchester, England
- Coordinates: 53.3891°N 2.3507°W
- Year built: Late 18th century
- Closed: 2024
- Client: Richard Irlam Grantham

Design and construction
- Designations

Listed Building – Grade II
- Official name: Former Orange Tree Inn
- Designated: 29 January 2026
- Reference no.: 1495433

The Orange Tree is a Grade II listed former public house occupying 13 and 15 Old Market Place in Altrincham, a market town within Trafford, Greater Manchester, England. It originated as two late 18th‑century houses incorporating earlier timber framing on a medieval burgage plot, and was adapted for commercial use in the 19th century, when No. 15 became a beerhouse and adopted the name Orange Tree. The pub was extended into the adjoining No. 13 during the 1970s, creating the present combined building. It lies within the Old Market Place conservation area, designated in 1973, and traded until its closure in 2024.

== History ==
The building originated as two adjoining houses, 13 and 15 Old Market Place, constructed in the late 18th century on a burgage plot from the medieval period fronting Altrincham's marketplace. Both structures incorporated earlier timber‑framed fabric and were probably rebuilt for Richard Irlam Grantham, a local landowner who later served as mayor. Grantham occupied No. 15 while letting No. 13 to tenants.

During the 19th century the properties were progressively adapted for commercial use as the town centre developed. By the 1860s No. 15 had been refronted with a rendered façade and parapet and was operating as a beerhouse. The name Orange Tree was adopted around 1874, taken from a nearby public house on Railway Street that was demolished during street improvements. (Note: Another source states that it became a pub around 1881, taking its name from another Altrincham establishment that burned down in 1880.) The 1898 Ordnance Survey map marks the building as a public house without an attributed name, while the 1910 and 1938 editions simply show the building.

In 1973 the site was included within the newly designated Old Market Place conservation area. Substantial alterations followed in the 1970s, when the pub was expanded into the adjoining No. 13, resulting in major internal reconfiguration. Despite these changes, elements of the 18th‑century brickwork and earlier timber framing remain visible within the structure.

The Orange Tree traded for more than a century before closing in 2024. A planning application submitted the following year proposed conversion to a restaurant with a ten‑bed HMO above, though no decision had been published by mid‑2026. On 29 January 2026, the former pub was designated a Grade II listed building.

== Architecture ==
=== Exterior ===
The front of the building is mainly red brick, with No. 13 painted and No. 15 rendered, while later brickwork appears on parts of the north and rear elevations. Some earlier timber framing survives inside, and the roofs are mostly artificial slate. The east front has three storeys and five bays: No. 13 forms the broader left‑hand section with a modern pub frontage, and No. 15 forms the two narrower bays with a rendered upper front and a 19th‑century parapet. The north elevation to Albert Place is rendered and gabled, with a lower catslide roof to one side and later brickwork set back behind it. The rear is a mix of render and later brick additions, including a stair bay to No. 13, while the south side is largely concealed by No. 11.

=== Interior ===
No. 13 has been altered over time, especially at the front, but it still contains earlier brick and timber work on all floors. A late 18th‑century staircase survives, along with historic beams in the ground‑floor rooms and parts of the original roof structure. The cellar retains sections of brick vaulting and stone walling.

No. 15 keeps a mixture of later and earlier features, including a late 18th‑century staircase, wide floorboards, and sections of timber framing with early infill. Some rooms contain older moulded beams, and the rear outshut preserves parts of its original roof and brick walls. The cellar includes remains of an earlier brick vault.

== See also ==
- Listed buildings in Altrincham
- Listed pubs in Greater Manchester
