= Admiral Taverns =

UK pub company

Admiral Taverns is a pub company in the UK. Founded in 2003 by the Landesberg and Rosenberg families in London. It was acquired in 2017 by US investment fund Proprium Capital Partners.

From 2004 to 2010, the pubco grew with a series of 13 acquisitions which took its total number of venues to over 3,000. In 2014 Admiral acquired 111 pubs from Star Pubs & Bars.

In 2013, US investment firm Cerberus Capital Management acquired Admiral in a £200 million deal from Lloyd's Banking Group, which had been a shareholder since a debt refinancing deal in 2009. In 2017, Magners' producer C&C Group and US investor Proprium Capital Partners acquired Admiral, with C&C investing £37 million. In 2021, C&C offloaded its stake in Admiral to Proprium for £55 million.

In 2017, Admiral bought 29 venues from Star Pubs & Bars in a deal with G1. This was followed by a deal for 150 more Star Pubs venues in 2019, bringing Admiral's total number of pubs to around 950. In November 2019, another 137 pubs were acquired from Marston's for £44.9m, in a deal that helped Marston's reduce its debt.

In 2021, Admiral acquired 650 pubs from Hawthorn for £222.3m, taking the company's total to 1,600 pubs. In May 2024, Admiral announced the purchase of 37 tenanted pubs from Fuller, Smith and Turner for £18.3 million. Later that year, pubs across the Admiral estate received recognition at the 2024 PubAid Community Pub Hero Awards, highlighting their role in local community support.
