= Beerhouse =

Former type of drinking establishment

A beerhouse was a type of public house created in the United Kingdom by the Beerhouse Act 1830 (11 Geo. 4 & 1 Will. 4. c. 64), legally defined as a place "where beer is sold to be consumed on the premises". They were also known as "small" or "Tom and Jerry" shops Existing public houses were issued with licences by local magistrates under the terms of the Retail Brewers Act 1828 (9 Geo. 4. c. 68), and were subject to police inspections at any time of the day or night. Proprietors of the new beerhouses, on the other hand, simply had to buy a licence from the government costing two guineas per annum, equivalent to about £150 as of 2010. (Note: Comparing the relative purchasing power of £2.10 in 1830 with 2010.) Until the Wine and Beerhouse Act 1869 (32 & 33 Vict. c. 27) gave local magistrates the authority to renew beerhouse licences, the two classes of establishment were in direct competition.

The Ordnance Survey conventional sign for beerhouses is BH.
