= World Pie Eating Championship =

Annual competitive eating competition

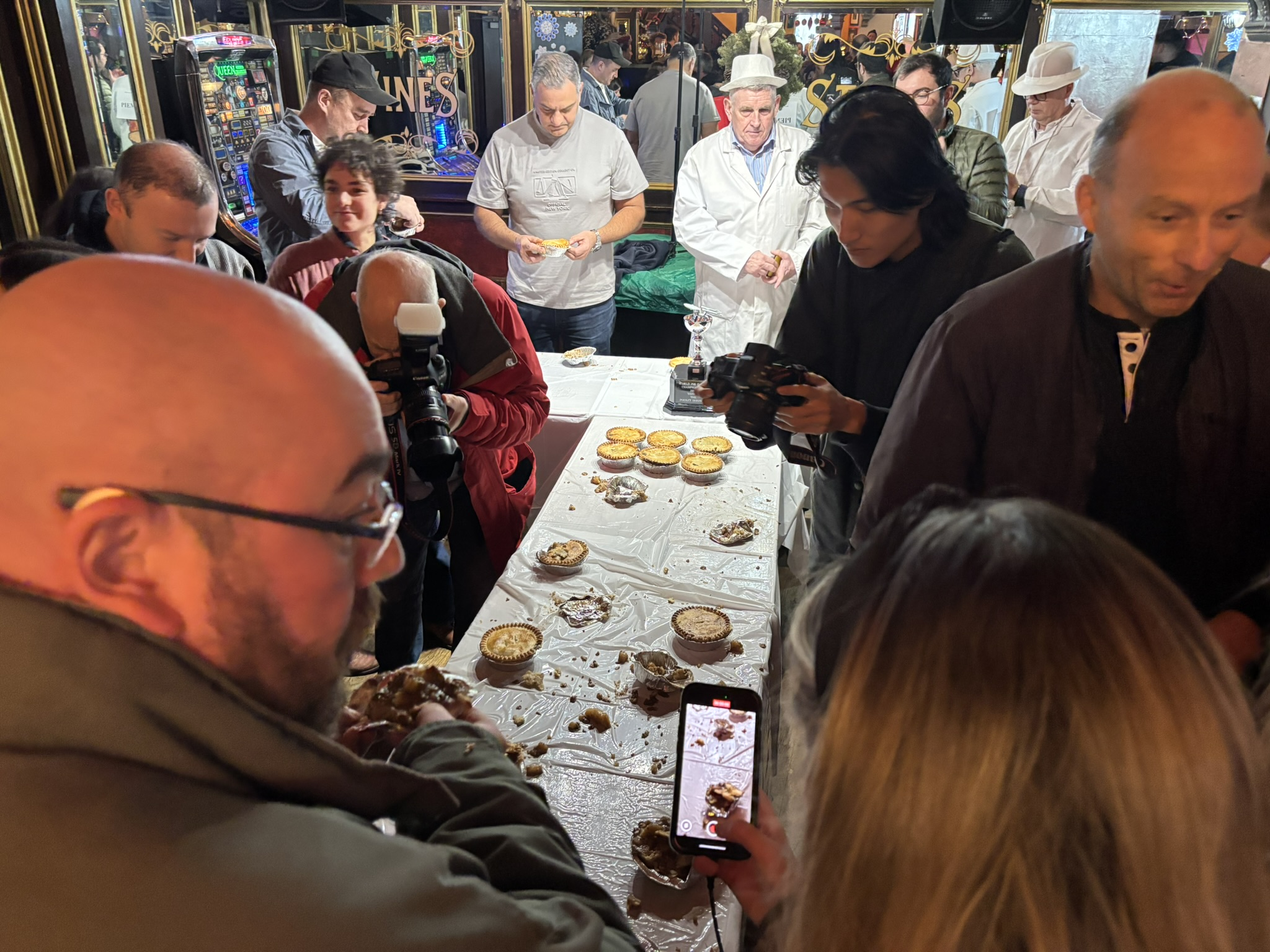
Remants of pies from losing contestants in 2024

The World Pie Eating Championship is an annual contest usually held at Harry's Bar on Wallgate in Wigan, Greater Manchester, England. The competition has been held since 1992.

== History ==
The competition was first held in 1992.

In 2006 the competition was changed to meet government healthy eating guidelines, from the number of pies consumed in a given time, to the fastest time to consume a single pie. A vegetarian version was also added with the organiser citing "relentless pressure" from The Vegetarian Society, but this practice was discontinued from 2007.

In the 2006 contest, the meat and potato pies were all 12 cm (5 in) in diameter with a depth of 3.5 cm (1.5 in). In the separate vegetarian contest, the pies were 10 cm (4 in) by 3 cm (1.2 in). In December 2007, in the competition, entries included a competitor's dog, Charlie, who had eaten twenty pies and damaged a further ten the night before the competition, nearly jeopardising the event.

== Winners ==
Year	Winner	Pies	Time
1992	Dave Smyth	Four pies	3 minutes
1995	Dave Williams	?	?
1998	Scott Ormrod	Eleven pies	30 minutes
2005	Anthony "The Anaconda" Danson	Seven pies	3 minutes
2006	Matt Dunning	?	?
2007	Adrian Frost	One pie	35.86 seconds
2008	Fred Wyatt	One meat and potato pie	43 seconds
2009	Barry Rigby	One pie	45 seconds
2010	Neil Collier	One pie	23.91 seconds
2012	Martin Clare	One pie	22.53 secs
2013	Ian Coulton	One pie	66.61 seconds
2014	Barry Rigby	Half an oversized pie	42.6 seconds
2015	Martin Appleton Clare	?	?
2016	Martin Appleton-Clare	One meat and potato pie	45.5 seconds
2017	Martin Appleton Clare	?	?
2018	Martin Appleton Clare	One chicken and carrot pie	19.6 seconds
2019	Ian Gerrard	One pie	34.5 seconds
2022	Barry Rigby	One pie	35.4 seconds
2023	Ian Coulton	One meat and potato pie	37.4 seconds
2024	Michael Chant	One pie	17 seconds
2025	Tom O'Neil	One pie	62 seconds

Channel 5 filmed the 2024 event for their TV show 22 Kids and Counting, as the show's star Noel Radford supplied the pies for the competition. The championship's organiser and "piemaster", Tony Callaghan, dropped and partly broke the trophy. Hits Radio interviewed Callaghan afterwards. Several newspapers were also present.

== Controversy ==
In 2005 pies were imported from nearby Farnworth in Bolton, and local Wigan pies were sidelined as it was believed they were substandard, leading to a four-man strong protest. In December 2009, a similar situation arose, with pies being sourced from Adlington in Lancashire.

In December 2014, pies of the wrong size were delivered to the event, while the intended pies were sent to a nearby divorce party. The contestants competed with halved pies, but the results were nullified. The head of the World Pie Eating Championship went to court on the television show Judge Rinder, presenting a case against the pie maker of the wrongly sized pies, but was awarded nothing.

== Background ==
Wiganers are proud to be called pie eaters, but the nickname is not thought to be because of their appetite for the delicacy. The name is said to date from the 1926 general strike, when Wigan miners were starved back to work, before their counterparts in surrounding towns and were forced to eat "humble pie".

== See also ==
- The Great Aussie Pie Competition
