= Walkers of Warrington =

Former brewery in Warrington, England

Walkers of Warrington was a brewery in Warrington, England.

== History ==
The company was established by Peter Walker in 1846, when he acquired Pemberton's Brewery in Warrington and, having admitted his son Andrew to the business, started trading as Peter Walker & Son. The company became Walkers of Warrington in 1864. It merged with Cains Brewery to form Walker Cains in 1921, and then with Joshua Tetley & Son to form Tetley Walker in 1960.
