= The Berkeley, Wigan =

Listed pub in Greater Manchester, England

The Berkeley
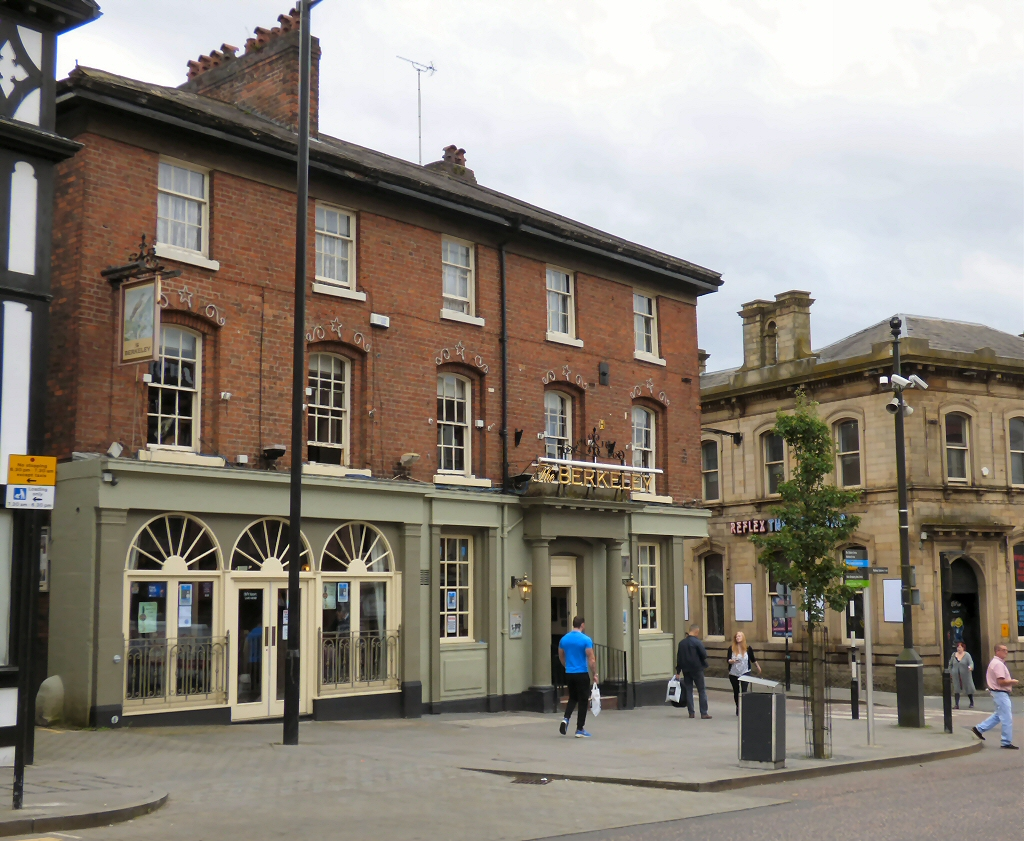
- The pub in 2016, viewed from Wallgate

- Location within Greater Manchester
- Former names: Berkeley Square; Blair's; Minorca Hotel

General information
- Type: Public house
- Location: 27–29 Wallgate, Wigan, Greater Manchester, England
- Coordinates: 53.5451°N 2.6322°W
- Year built: c. 1820; 206 years ago
- Renovated: 1857 (altered); 1968 (remodelled)
- Owner: Amber Taverns

Design and construction
- Designations

Listed Building – Grade II
- Official name: 27 and 29 Wallgate, including 2, 4 and 6 King Street
- Designated: 11 July 1983
- Reference no.: 1384546

Website
- Official website

The Berkeley (officially listed as 27 and 29 Wallgate, including 2, 4 and 6 King Street) is a Grade II listed public house on Wallgate in Wigan, Greater Manchester, England. Built around 1820 as an inn, it was long known as the Minorca Hotel and was remodelled in 1857 to designs by Alfred Waterhouse, with further alterations in 1968. It later traded as the Berkeley Square before adopting its current name.

== History ==
A farm and malt kiln occupied the site in 1763, but by 1791 an inn owned by William Roper stood there; Roper was also a party to the agreement with the corporation that established King Street. The inn, then known as The Thornton, occupied a prominent corner position at King Street and Wallgate. It was rebuilt as a Georgian‑style inn around 1820, according to its official listing.

The public house was known for many years as the Minorca Hotel. The reason for the name is unclear, though one account links it to a Spanish refugee from the Napoleonic Wars who is said to have run the inn and named it after his home island. By 1843 the Minorca Hotel belonged to the Wigan Brewery Company, whose estate, including the Minorca, the brewery and 86 other pubs, was offered for sale in a single lot in 1894 and acquired by Magee Marshall & Co. The building was altered in 1857 to designs prepared by Alfred Waterhouse, a prominent Victorian architect. The 1894 Ordnance Survey map marks the building as a hotel with no attributed name, while the 1908 and 1942 editions show it as a public house.

In 1968 the Berni Inns group acquired the building and carried out a major remodelling, creating two restaurants, four bars and a bier keller. By the 1980s the pub was trading as Blair's, later taking the name Berkeley Square, after the square in London. On 11 July 1983, the building was designated a Grade II listed structure. As of 2025, the pub's freehold is owned by Amber Taverns. It now trades as The Berkeley, although the date of this change is not recorded in published sources.

== Architecture ==
The building is mainly red brick in an English garden wall bond with some stone and pale terracotta details, and has a hipped slate roof. The front part of the ground floor has been covered with square tiles and painted. Nos. 27–29 form an L‑shaped layout on a corner plot.

The frontage to Wallgate has three storeys and five windows, with simple detailing at the top of the ground floor and at the eaves. At street level, the fourth bay contains the main entrance, set within a plain Tuscan surround, and is flanked by fixed‑pane windows. The first two bays have a wide shop‑style window, and the right‑hand corner is angled with another fixed window. The upper floors have recessed sash windows: larger ones with arched heads on the first floor and smaller ones above, all with projecting sills.

The return elevation to King Street also has five windows on the upper floors in the same style. The ground floor includes a doorway with fixed windows on either side, followed by a wide arched opening with dressed stonework.

Nos. 2, 4 and 6 King Street continue the range for three bays. Their upper floors match the main section, while the ground floor has a shop front with a recessed entrance and large display windows.

== See also ==
- Listed buildings in Wigan
- Listed pubs in Greater Manchester
