= Listed buildings in Wigan =

Wigan is a town in the Metropolitan Borough of Wigan, Greater Manchester, England. The town, together with the outlying townships of Pemberton, Scholes, Whelley, Worsley Mesnes, Winstanley, and Goose Green, (the former Wigan County Borough), contains 286 listed buildings that are recorded in the National Heritage List for England. Of these, 31 are listed at Grade II*, the middle of the three grades, and the others are at Grade II, the lowest grade.

Wigan is an ancient settlement that developed into a market town, but its main growth came with the arrival of the Industrial Revolution when its surrounding areas became the main centres of mining in the South Lancashire Coalfield. Its main industries, in addition to coal mining, were textiles and ironworks. The Leeds and Liverpool Canal passes through the town, having been built between 1774 and 1816, and this improved transport before the railways arrived. These factors resulted in the development not only of mills and factories, but housing and the construction of shops, churches, leisure facilities including public houses, and municipal, civic and commercial buildings. This history is reflected in the listed buildings.

== Key ==
Grade	Criteria
II*	Particularly important buildings of more than special interest
II	Buildings of national importance and special interest

== Buildings ==
Name and location	Photograph	Date	Notes	Grade
Milestone; 53.56042°N 2.62892°W	—	Roman (presumed)	The milestone is set into a boundary wall by the side of the road. It is in sandstone with a rounded top and an eroded face. The milestone measures about 0.3 metres (1 ft 0 in) wide and 0.5 metres (1 ft 8 in) tall.	II
Stump of boundary cross 53.52555°N 2.65531°W	—	Medieval (probable)	The structure, which has been relocated, is in the grounds of a school. It is in gritstone, and has a base with chamfered corners about 1 metre (3 ft 3 in) square and 0.5 metres (1 ft 8 in) tall. On the base is the stump of a shaft about 1 metre (3 ft 3 in) tall, which is square at the bottom, and becomes octagonal.	II
Mab's Cross; 53.55145°N 2.62742°W		13th century (probable)	The stump of a boundary cross, it is in gritstone. The cross consists of a square plinth of rectangular blocks on which is set diagonally a square cross-base with the stump of a chamfered shaft. On the front is an inscribed metal plaque.	II*
All Saints' Church; 53.54599°N 2.63277°W		15th century	The church was largely rebuilt in 1845–1850 by Sharpe and Paley, it is in sandstone with a lead-clad roof, and is in Perpendicular style. The church consists of a nave and chancel under a continuous roof with a clerestory, north and south aisles, a north chapel, a south porch, a north vestry and a north tower. Between the nave and the chancel are octagonal turrets with crocketed caps, and along the body of the church are embattled parapets and crocketed pinnacles. The tower is square and has four unequal stages, diagonal buttresses, a top stage with blind arcading and clock faces, a moulded cornice with gargoyles, and an embattled parapet with crocketed pinnacles.	II*
Boundary wall and two archways, All Saints' Church; 53.54594°N 2.63328°W		Late 15th or early 16th century (probable)	The archway to the west of the church is the oldest part, the wall and the south archway dating probably from the late 19th century. They are in sandstone and the railings are in cast iron. The original archway has chamfered piers and buttresses, and contains a moulded depressed arch, a hipped and moulded parapet, and a cross finial. The walls extend along the west and south sides of the churchyard, they are ramped down the slope, and at the corner is a later but similar archway.	II
4–14 The Wiend; 53.54604°N 2.63112°W		Late 17th century (probable)	Originally a barn, later four shops, in rendered brick on a plinth with a slate roof. On the ground floor are shop fronts of varying types, and on the upper floor are windows, some of which are sashes.	II
48 Millgate; 53.54552°N 2.62933°W	—	Late 17th century	The house was refronted and remodelled in the mid-18th century and there have been subsequent alterations. It is in red brick on a chamfered sandstone plinth, with sandstone dressings, rusticated quoins, and a slate roof. It is in Georgian style, with two storeys, a symmetrical front of five bays. The central doorway has engaged Ionic columns, a dentilled cornice and a modillioned pediment. The windows are sashes with raised sills, and wedge lintels with keystones and voussoirs.	II
Beech Hill Farm and wall 53.55877°N 2.65822°W	—	Late 17th century (probable)	The farmhouse has been altered and is now a private house. It is rendered and has a slate roof. There are two storeys, a single-depth plan, three bays, and a one-bay parallel range at the rear. The windows are mullioned, and most have hood moulds. Inside is a timber framed partition, and enclosing the area at the front of the house is a sandstone wall, about 1 metre (3 ft 3 in) tall, with rounded coping.	II
Whitesmiths Arms public house 53.54947°N 2.62929°W		Late 17th century (probable)	The public house has been considerably altered, it is in brick, stuccoed on the front and left return, with moulded bands, and a slate roof. There are 2½ storeys, four bays and three gables on the front. On the lower two floors are cross-windows, sash windows in the attics, and casement windows in the right return.	II
Tyldesley monument 53.55486°N 2.62784°W		1679	The monument commemorates Thomas Tyldesley, a Royalist commander during the English Civil War, who was killed on this spot in 1651. It was restored in 1886, it is in sandstone, and consists of a pier about 1 metre (3 ft 3 in) square and 5 metres (16 ft) tall on a pedestal with moulded coping. On the top is a moulded cornice and a ball finial, and on the sides are slate plaques, two with inscriptions.	II
John Bull Chophouse; 53.54609°N 2.63103°W		17th or early 18th century (probable)	Probably originally two cottages and a stable, later a public house, it is in brick with a slate roof. The building has an elongated single-depth linear plan and two storeys, and contains square-headed doorways. Most windows are mullioned, there are two small square windows, and one casement window.	II
54 and 56 Wallgate; 53.54441°N 2.63334°W		Early 18th century (probable)	A house, converted into a shop in the 19th century, in brick with a slate roof. There are two low storeys, two bays, and a rear extension. On the ground floor are two 19th-century shop fronts, a recessed doorway with a panelled side wall, pilasters, decorative consoles, and a modillion cornice with ball finials. On the upper floor are sash windows.	II
Section of churchyard wall, All Saints' Church; 53.54622°N 2.63251°W	—	Early 18th century (probable)	The wall formed part of the northeast boundary of the churchyard. It is in sandstone with rounded coping, and is about 3.5 metres (11 ft) long and 3 metres (9.8 ft) tall. The wall incorporates an inscribed stone plaque with the names of churchwardens.	II
Gate piers, All Saints' Church; 53.54627°N 2.63312°W	—	Early to mid-18th century	The pair of gate piers is at the north entrance to the churchyard. The piers are in rusticated sandstone, about 0.5 metres (1 ft 8 in) square, 3.5 metres (11 ft) tall, and have peaked caps. The west pier has a moulded cornice.	II
5, 7 and 9 The Wiend; 53.54599°N 2.63125°W		Mid-18th century (probable)	Three houses, later shops, in brick on a stone plinth, with stone dressings and a slate roof. There are three storeys and five bays. On the ground floor are three doorways, one with a square head and a rusticated keyed lintel, the others with round heads, and three shop fronts. On the middle floor are windows with rusticated keyed lintels, and on the top floor are sash windows with segmental-arched brick heads.	II
11 Market Place and 2 The Wiend; 53.54615°N 2.63142°W		Mid-18th century (probable)	A house, later a shop and office, on a corner site. It is in brick, partly rendered, with quoins to the right, bands, and a slate roof. It has a narrow rectangular plan, three storeys and an attic, and a front of two bays. On the ground floor is a modern shop front, and above are sash windows with moulded architraves. On the right return are mullioned and transomed windows, two with horizontally-sliding sashes, and a taking-in door.	II
704 Warrington Road; 53.51993°N 2.65197°W	—	Mid-18th century	A brick house on a sandstone chamfered plinth, with sandstone dressings, rusticated quoins, a sill band, and a slate roof. It has two storeys, a double-depth plan, and two bays. The doorway has a fanlight and a plain lintel, and the 20th-century windows have wedge lintels with keystones. On the upper floor is a plaque.	II
Old Bluecoat School; 53.54603°N 2.63332°W		c. Mid-18th century	The building, once used as a Bluecoat School, and later for other purposes, is in sandstone, and the roof is slated. It is a single cell, with one storey, two bays, and a canted outshut at the rear. There is a square-headed doorway flanked by mullioned windows, all with chamfered surrounds and hood moulds.	II
Section of boundary wall, All Saints' Church; 53.54571°N 2.63300°W		18th century (or earlier)	The wall forms part of the boundary of the churchyard, and was formerly two walls of a brewery. It is in sandstone and in varying heights of about 4 metres (13 ft). The wall incorporates a stone tablet and a plaque, both inscribed and dated.	II
134 Standishgate; 53.55113°N 2.62797°W	—	1753	A brick house on a sandstone plinth, with sandstone dressings, a modillioned eaves cornice, and a slate roof. It is in Georgian style, with three storeys, a double-depth plan, and a symmetrical front of three bays. The house has a central round-headed doorway with a radial fanlight, and the windows are sashes with wedge lintels and keystones.	II
136 Standishgate and wall 53.55128°N 2.62790°W	—	1755	A brick house with sandstone dressings on a deep plinth, with rusticated quoins, a modillioned eaves cornice, and a slate roof, and is in Georgian style. There are three storeys, a double-depth plan, and a symmetrical front of three bays. Steps flanked by curved walls lead to a doorway with a square head, an architrave with a keystone, and a fanlight. The windows are sashes in moulded architraves with keystones, and have sills with moulded corbels. In front of the house is a low wall with railings, and to the left is a two-storey screen wall. This contains an elliptical-headed archway with a rusticated surround and a keystone, above which is a keyed oculus and a moulded cornice.	II
138 Standishgate; 53.55138°N 2.62782°W	—	Mid to late 18th century (probable)	A brick house with sandstone dressings on a deep plinth, with a plain frieze, a moulded cornice, and a slate roof, and is in Georgian style. There are three storeys, a double-depth plan, and four bays. On the left is a convex corner containing a doorway with a fanlight. The windows are sashes with raised sills and wedge lintels.	II
Royal Oak Hotel; 53.55017°N 2.62829°W		Mid to late 18th century (probable)	The public house is stuccoed, probably on brick, on a sandstone plinth, with sandstone dressings, rusticated quoins, and a slate roof. It has three storeys, a double-depth plan, and five bays. The doorway has Tuscan semi-columns, and a modillioned pediment. The windows are sashes with divided triple keystones.	II
706 Warrington Road; 53.51986°N 2.65195°W	—	Late 18th century (probable)	A brick house with sandstone dressings and a slate roof, it has two storeys, a double-depth plan, and one bay. The doorway has a fanlight and a plain lintel, and the 20th-century windows have wedge lintels. On the right gable end is faded lettering.	II
Bridge Warehouse; 53.54234°N 2.63863°W		1777	The warehouse, at the basin of the Leeds and Liverpool Canal, was converted into offices in 1984. It is in sandstone with quoins and a slate roof, and has a double-pile plan bridging the canal basin. It has two storeys over a basement containing two shipping holes, and has two gables. The shipping holes have semicircular arches and voussoirs. The former openings have been replaced by windows, and in each gable is a lunette.	II
St George's Church; 53.54863°N 2.62802°W		1781	The church was damaged by fire in 1980, and restored in 1988. It is in brick on a rendered plinth, and has sandstone dressings and a slate roof. The church has a rectangular plan with a short rectangular apse. There are two storeys and a symmetrical entrance front of three bays. The central bay projects slightly, and contains a semi-elliptical archway containing a doorcase with engaged Tuscan columns, and a round-headed doorway with imposts, a keystone, and a fanlight. Above it is a niche, a shaped gable containing a panel with a cross, and a bellcote with scrolled supporters. Each of the outer bays has a round-headed window, and there are two tiers of round-headed windows along the sides of the church. The apse has a tall round-headed window with a moulded architrave and a keystone.	II
7, 9 and 11 King Street; 53.54467°N 2.63191°W	—	c. 1800	Three houses, later two shops, in brick with some sandstone dressings, the right return rendered, a fluted frieze, a modillion eaves cornice, and a slate roof. There are three storeys, a double-depth plan, two bays each, and rear extensions. On the ground floor are shop fronts, and above are sash windows with wedge lintels. At the rear is a tall stair window and a horizontally-sliding sash window.	II
13 and 15 King Street; 53.54460°N 2.63178°W	—	c. 1800	A house with another house added at the rear, later used for other purposes, in brick with some sandstone dressings, a fluted frieze, a modillion eaves cornice, and a slate roof. There are three storeys, a double-depth plan, three bays, and a large rear extension. On the ground floor are shop fronts, and above are sash windows with wedge lintels.	II
21, 23 and 25 King Street; 53.54447°N 2.63152°W	—	c. 1800	A house, later shops and offices, in brick with some sandstone dressings, a moulded eaves cornice, and a slate roof. There are three storeys, a double-depth plan, a symmetrical front of five bays, and a rear extension. In the centre is a round-headed doorway with ¾ Tuscan columns, flat abaci, urns on the friezes, a fanlight, and an open pediment. The windows are sashes, those in the centre with moulded architraves, and that on the middle floor with a cornice.	II
Former Westwood Estate Office; 53.54395°N 2.62923°W		Late 18th or early 19th century (probable)	The office was remodelled in 1896, and has since been used for other purposes. It is in sandstone and brick with freestone and terracotta dressings and a slate roof. There are two storeys, a symmetrical front of three bays, and a rear extension. It has pilasters, a string course, a moulded cornice, a balustraded parapet, and conical roofs over the outer bays. In the centre is an elliptical-arched doorway with a moulded head and a lettered frieze, which is surrounded by an elaborate architrave with free-standing columns, a moulded cornice, and an upstand. In the outer bays are two-storey canted bay windows, and the windows are sashes.	II
Public house 53.54557°N 2.63251°W		Late 18th or early 19th century	A public house in red brick on a chamfered plinth, with sandstone dressings, rusticated quoins, a plain frieze, an eaves cornice and blocking course, and a slate roof. It is in Georgian style, and has three storeys, a double-depth plan, a symmetrical front of three bays, and a rear wing. The central round-headed doorway has engaged Tuscan columns and a fanlight. The windows are sashes, tripartite on the lower two floors, and with wedge lintels. (Note: Street View in October 2016 shows that the name has been changed to the Dog and Partridge.)	II
Lock No. 21; 53.53989°N 2.62530°W		1816	The lock is on the Wigan Flight on the Leeds and Liverpool Canal. It is in sandstone with concrete coping. The gates and beams at the upper end are in oak, and at the lower end they are in iron. There are three mooring bollards on each side, and an overflow channel on the south side.	II
Lock No. 23; 53.54033°N 2.63711°W		1816	The lock is on the Wigan Flight on the Leeds and Liverpool Canal. It is in sandstone, and has wooden gates at the lower end and steel gates at the upper end. At the lower end is a metal footbridge.	II
Pottery Bridge; 53.54174°N 2.63950°W		1816	Originally a roving bridge over an arm of the Leeds and Liverpool Canal, later widened to carry the A49 road. The original part is in sandstone, and consists of an elliptical arch with rusticated voussoirs, a keystone on the north side, and a cobbled crossover deck. The additions are in cast iron.	II
St Mary's Church; 53.55034°N 2.62760°W		1818	A Roman Catholic church in sandstone with a slate roof, and in Gothic style. It consists of a nave with an integral narthex, north and south aisles, and a chancel. The entrance front has two storeys and five bays, the central bay gabled. Between the bays are pilaster-buttresses rising to crocketed pinnacles and an embattled parapet. In the central bay is a large five-light window with Perpendicular tracery, and on the gable apex is a bellcote. The flanking bays contain doorways with Tudor arched heads and chamfered surrounds.	II*
St John's Church; 53.54934°N 2.62790°W		1818–19	A Roman Catholic church in sandstone with a hipped slate roof, and in Classical style. It has a rectangular plan, and a west front of two storeys and five bays. On the front is a porch of six unfluted Ionic columns, with an inscribed frieze, an impost band, a cornice, a blocking course, and a central upstand. There are three round-headed doorways with stepped voussoirs and fanlights. On the roof is a louvred cupola with a domed roof, and at the rear are paired sash windows.	II*
27 and 29 Wallgate, including 2, 4 and 6 King Street; 53.54505°N 2.63217°W		c. 1820	A public house and a shop in red brick, the ground floor faced in tiles, with some dressings in sandstone and terracotta and a hipped slate roof. It is on a corner site and has an L-shaped plan, with three storeys, five bays on the front in Wallgate, and five bays on the right along King Street. On the ground floor the first two bays contains a shop front. The fourth bay has a Tuscan doorcase with a modillioned cornice and a blocking course. The windows are sashes. In the fifth bay of the right return is a segmental-headed wagon archway with a rusticated surround. (Note: Formerly listed as "Blairs Public House". Currently The Berkeley.)	II
St John's Club; 53.54954°N 2.62875°W	—	c. 1820	The building is in brick on a sandstone plinth, with sandstone dressings, a sill band, a moulded cornice, and a hipped slate roof. It has a rectangular plan at right angles to the street, with two storeys and five bays. Above the middle three bays is a pediment. In the centre is a round-headed doorway with semi-columns and an entablature with triglyphs and guttae, and a blocked fanlight. The windows are sashes with wedge lintels.	II
1 New Lodge; 53.55620°N 2.62808°W	—	c. 1820–1840	A brick house with sandstone dressings, a sill band, and a moulded cornice. The west gable is tile-hung, and the roof is slated. There are two storeys with a cellar, a double-depth plan, three bays, and a recessed lower two-storey one-bay wing to the left. Three steps lead up to a round-headed doorway with fluted columns and a fanlight. The windows are sashes with wedge lintels.	II
The Elms; 53.55964°N 2.62995°W	—	c. 1820–1840	A house, later used for other purposes, in red brick on a sandstone plinth, with sandstone dressings and a hipped slate roof. It is in late Georgian style, and has two storeys with cellars, a symmetrical front of five bays, and a rear three-storey service wing. The centre bay projects slightly, and has a sill band, a plain frieze, a moulded cornice, and a blocking course. It contains a square porch with Doric columns and pilasters, and a square-headed doorway with a fanlight. The windows are sashes with wedge lintels.	II
St John the Divine's Church, Pemberton; 53.53698°N 2.68298°W		1830–1832	A Commissioners' church by Thomas Rickman and Henry Hutchinson in Gothic Revival style, it is in red brick with sandstone dressings and a slate roof. The church consists of a nave, north and south aisles, and a short chancel. The west front is gabled with clasping corner pilasters rising to stone turrets with louvred lancets and embattled parapets. In the front is a gabled porch, a triple lancet window, and a louvred lancet. The windows elsewhere are lancets, and at the east end is a triple stepped lancet. Inside the church are galleries on three sides.	II
Wall and gateways, St John the Divine's Church; 53.53678°N 2.68314°W	—	c. 1832 (probable)	The wall runs along the west and south sides of the churchyard, and there are gateways opposite the west and south doors of the church. The wall is in sandstone with rounded coping. The gate piers are octagonal, and have chamfered plinths, trefoil friezes, and shallow octagonal caps. The gates are elaborate and in wrought iron.	II
7 Upper Dicconson Street; 53.55020°N 2.63088°W	—	Early to mid-19th century	A brick house with sandstone dressings, a sill band, and a slate roof. It is in Georgian style, and has three storeys, a double-depth plan, and a symmetrical front of three bays. There is a semi-elliptical headed doorway with a Tuscan doorcase and a fanlight. The windows are sash windows with wedge lintels.	II
17–33 Dicconson Street and 1, 3 and 5 Upper Dicconson Street; 53.54989°N 2.63104°W		Early to mid-19th century	A block of twelve town houses, some later used for other purposes, in red brick with sandstone dressings, a sill band, and slate roofs. They are in Georgian style, obtusely angled on a corner site, and have three storeys with cellars and two or three bays each. The doorways have semicircular heads, a Tuscan doorcase, and a fanlight, and the windows are sash windows with raised sills, and wedge lintels on the lower two floors.	II
Cottage adjoining Henhurst Lock; 53.53981°N 2.63182°W	—	Early to mid-19th century	The cottage, adjacent to a lock on the Leeds and Liverpool Canal, is in sandstone with a composition tile roof. It has two storeys, four bays, and a lean-to rear extension. The doorway has a square surround, there is a canted oriel window in the fourth bay, and the other windows are sashes.	II
Railway bridge, Frog Lane; 53.54759°N 2.63944°W		c. 1838	The bridge was built by the North Union Railway Company to carry its line over the road. It is a skew bridge in sandstone, and consists of a large semicircular arch with rusticated voussoirs, a chamfered band, parapets with flat coping, and central and end piers.	II
St Catharine's Church, Scholes; 53.54625°N 2.61691°W		1839–1841	A Commissioners' church designed by Edmund Sharpe in Early English style, it is built in Billinge sandstone and has slate roofs. The church consists of a nave and a short chancel in one vessel, a south vestry, and a west steeple joined to the church by a narthex with stair turrets in the angles. The steeple has a two-stage tower with a west doorway, angle buttresses, corner pinnacles, clock faces, an octagonal bell stage, and a tall octagonal spire with two tiers of lucarnes. The windows are lancets, and at the east end is a triple stepped lancet window.	II
4 Lansdowne Terrace; 53.55247°N 2.62915°W	—	c. 1840	A stuccoed house at the end of a terrace, with sandstone dressings, quoins to the left, and a slate roof, hipped to the left. It is on a corner site, with two storeys and a cellar, and three bays. The central doorway has a pilastered architrave, a moulded cornice, and a blocking course. The windows are sashes with rectangular lintels.	II
Gateway and lodges, Haigh Hall Park; 53.55946°N 2.62802°W		c. 1840	The gateway and flanking lodges are in sandstone, the lodges having slate roofs. The central gateway has a round-headed arch with a moulded arch and impost, Doric pilasters, and an entablature with a frieze and a moulded cornice. Hanging from the arch is a cast iron lamp bracket. The lodges are square, each lodge has one storey, one bay, a moulded plinth, a frieze, a moulded cornice, a blocking course, and a low pyramidal roof. At the front and the rear is a recess with Tuscan columns. Between the lodges and the arch, and within the arch, are cast iron railings and gates.	II*
Boundary wall, St Catharine's Church, Scholes; 53.54630°N 2.61725°W	—	1840 (probable)	The wall encloses the four sides of the churchyard, and is in sandstone with chamfered coping. Opposite the west wall of the church is a gate with piers about 2 metres (6 ft 7 in) tall. They are square up to the level of the coping, and octagonal above, and have octagonal caps and finials.	II
St Catherine's Vicarage; 53.54609°N 2.61647°W	—	c. 1840–1850 (probable)	The vicarage is in red brick with sandstone dressings and a hipped slate roof. There are two storeys, a double-depth plan, a symmetrical front of three bays, a wing to the right, and a garage to the left. The middle bay projects forward, and contains a square-headed doorway with an architrave and a cornice on consoles, and above is a round-headed window. The other windows are flat-headed and contain replacement casements with raised sills and wedge lintels.	II
26–34 King Street; 53.54457°N 2.63129°W	—	1851	A row of four houses in brick with sandstone dressings and a slate roof in late Georgian style. They have three storeys, a double-depth plan, and rear extensions. The doorways have round heads and fanlights, and there are smaller round-headed service entries. Apart from No. 34, they have two-storey canted bay windows with dentilled cornices and pediments; No. 34 has a modern shop front. The windows are sashes.	II
Walmesley monument 53.54949°N 2.62845°W		1852	The monument stands in front of St John's Church, and is said to be by A. W. N. Pugin. It is in sandstone, and has three square steps, a square pedestal with an inscription, a square shaft with moulded corners, shields and symbols of the Four Evangelists at the base, and at the top are statues of Virgin Mary and St John on corbels, and a crocketed gablet.	II
Church of St James with St Thomas; 53.53586°N 2.63785°W		1863–1867	The church was designed by E. G. Paley in Decorated style, and is in sandstone with slate roofs. It consists of a nave with a clerestory, north and south aisles, a chancel with a south chapel and a north vestry, and a west tower. The tower has five stages, angle buttresses, a southwest stair turret, a doorway with a moulded surround, a four-light west window, a crocketed niche, clock faces, a frieze with ball-flower decoration, and a pierced parapet with crocketed pinnacles. Along the nave and the aisles are embattled parapets, with grotesques, and in the chapel is a rose window.	II*
Pagefield Building, Wigan College; 53.55423°N 2.63711°W		1865	Formerly Gidlow Mill, an integrated cotton mill, consisting of a spinning mill incorporating an engine house and a boiler house, weaving sheds, and a chimney. The main block is in polychrome brick with a Welsh slate roof, in Italianate style, with an L-shaped plan, three storeys, and a maximum length of 24 bays. The windows on the lower two floors have segmental heads, on the top floor they have round heads, there are turrets with prominent cornices, and a tower at the rear.	II
Canal cottages and wall 53.54096°N 2.63802°W		Mid to late 19th century (probable)	A pair of brick cottages with a slate roof. They have two storeys and three bays each, the right bay a gabled cross-wing forming a T-shaped plan. The doorways have square heads, fanlights and hood moulds, and the windows are sashes, also with hood moulds. In front of the cottages is a gritstone wall with rounded coping, ramped up at the left, and with monolithic gate piers.	II
Former National Westminster Bank; 53.54489°N 2.63233°W		1866	The bank, later a nightclub, is in sandstone on a plinth, with friezes, a moulded cornice between the floors, a dentilled cornice at the top, and a hipped slate roof, and is in Classical style. It is on a corner site, with a rectangular plan, two storeys, and sides of four and six bays. The doorway is round-headed with a fanlight, an architrave and a moulded cornice. The windows are sashes, those on the ground floor with segmental heads and architraves with console keystones, and those on the upper floor with simpler surrounds.	II
Grimes Arcade Building; 53.54471°N 2.63148°W		1870	A shopping arcade with offices above in brick with sandstone facing and a hipped slate roof. It has a U-shaped plan with a front facing the street and two rear wings flanking the arcade, three storeys, and four bays. On the ground floor are unequal arched openings flanked by polished granite columns with foliate capitals, and roundels in the spandrels. The upper floors contain sash windows with colonettes and architraves, those on the middle floor having cusped heads.	II
Coops Factory; 53.54600°N 2.63518°W		1871	A clothing factory that was extended in 1888 and 1892. It is in yellow and red brick on a rusticated sandstone basement, and is in Italianate style. The factory is on a sloping site, it has four and six storeys, and a front of 17 bays. The main entrance has a round-headed doorway with a moulded surround, above which is a balcony. The windows have round arches with keystones. On the front are pilasters, at the top is a bracketed cornice, and the main block has a balustraded parapet. At the sides are 23 bays in similar style.	II
Royal Albert Edward Infirmary and kitchen 53.55777°N 2.62896°W		1873	The original entrance block to the hospital was designed by Thomas Worthington. It is in red brick on a chamfered plinth, with some blue brick, sandstone dressings, bands, a machicolated eaves cornice, and a slate mansard roof. The building has a T-shaped plan, the rear range containing the kitchen. There are two storeys, a symmetrical front of three bays, with a central tower. The central parts of the outer bays project forward they are gabled, and contain a rectangular bay window. In the centre is a porch with diagonal buttresses, an embattled parapet, an arched doorway with an inscribed voussoir, and a gable containing a shield. The tower is square with a lancet window, machicolation, a clock face, and a saddleback roof.	II
2–20 Swinley Road; 53.55462°N 2.62878°W	—	1875	A terrace of ten houses in red brick, partly stuccoed, with some sandstone, and slate roofs. The two central houses and the end houses project and have hipped roofs. There are three storeys with basements, a double-depth plan, and each house has one bay and a rear extension. The houses have impost bands, sill bands, and Lombard friezes to the eaves. Steps lead up to doorways with segmental heads and fanlights, each house has a ground floor bay window, and above the ground floor in the intermediate houses is a continuous canopy. Most of the windows are sashes.	II
Gatehouse, Wigan Hall and wall 53.54775°N 2.63563°W		1875	The gatehouse, designed by G. E. Street, has a sandstone ground floor, applied timber framing above, and a hipped tile roof with cockscomb ridge tiles. There are two storeys, an L-shaped plan with a rear wing, and four bays. In the third bay is a full-height archway, and in the second bay is a smaller arch. There is a casement window, a mullioned window, and one-light windows. At the rear is a gabled dormer, and a tile-hung gable.	II
Wigan Hall; 53.54820°N 2.63630°W		1875	A rectory designed by G. E. Street, it has a sandstone ground floor, timber framing with brick nogging on the upper floor, and red tiled roofs. The house has an irregular double-depth plan, two storeys, and five bays. The first bay projects as a gabled wing on a chamfered plinth, and the upper floor is jettied. On the ground floor is a four-light arcaded window, and above is a transomed window. In the second bay is a recessed doorway with a buttress to the right containing a roundel. Elsewhere there are cross-windows, and in the left return is a large bay window and an oriel window. At the rear is a long range with windows of various types.	II
St Michael's Church; 53.55403°N 2.62979°W		1875–1878	The church, designed by G. E. Street, is in sandstone with a slate roof. It consists of a nave with a clerestory, north and south aisles, a south porch, a north transept, and a chancel with a south vestry. Between the nave and the chancel is a bellcote.	II*
Terrace walls and steps, Wigan Hall; 53.54805°N 2.63648°W	—	c. 1875–1880	Two terrace walls and steps are in the garden of the house. The walls are in sandstone, and are about 1 metre (3 ft 3 in) tall and 50 metres (160 ft) long. At the north and south are flights of steps.	II
Railings, All Saints' Church; 53.54588°N 2.63311°W	—	Late 19th century	The railings enclose the south and west sides of church. They are in cast iron on a sandstone plinth, and are in Gothic style. The railings have cusped arches with Tudor rose decoration, and there are three sets of square gate posts with bishop's mitre finials.	II
5–15 Swinley Road; 53.55432°N 2.62869°W	—	1876 (probable)	A terrace of six red brick houses on a chamfered stone plinth, with terracotta dressings, some sandstone, and a slate roof. The houses have 2½ storeys and cellars, a double-depth plan, and one bay each. Steps lead up to paired doorways with moulded pilaster jambs, decorative capitals and fanlights. On the ground floor are canted bay windows, on the upper floor are sash windows with hood moulds, and in the attic are half-dormers with segmental-pointed heads flanked by coupled pilasters in gables with pargeting in the apex.	II
21 Upper Dicconson Street; 53.55096°N 2.63009°W	—	1877	A brick house at the end of a terrace, with a slate roof and a slated canopy above the ground floor. There are two storeys with an attic, two bays, and a rear extension. The house has a round-headed doorway with moulded imposts, a dentilled lintel, and a keystone. To the right is a canted bay window. On the upper floor is a round-headed window above the door, and two segmental-headed windows to the right, all with moulded imposts and keystones. It was at one time the home of William Lever.	II
Museum of Wigan Life; 53.54414°N 2.62962°W		1877	Originally a library designed by Alfred Waterhouse in Elizabethan style, later used for other purposes, it is in red brick with dressings in sandstone and ceramic, and a slate roof. It has a T-shaped plan, with two storeys, a basement and attics. The entrance in Rodney Street has an opening with a moulded arch, colonettes, and a gable with a roundel containing a relief of Dante. Elsewhere on the front are windows of varying types, including stair windows. The front on Library Street has a range of four bays with a gabled wing at each end. On the left gable end is a carved coat of arms, the windows are mullioned, and on the roof are three gabled dormers.	II
Entrance gateway, Mesnes Park; 53.55090°N 2.63368°W		1878	The gateway consists of two pairs of sandstone gate piers and cast iron gates. The inner pair of piers have bands, pulvinated friezes, moulded cornices, and large ball finials, and the outer pair are smaller and plainer, with moulded cornices and blocking courses. The gates have elaborate openwork, Jacobean motifs, shields and the date.	II
Entrance lodge, Mesnes Park; 53.55085°N 2.63377°W		1878 (probable)	The lodge is in sandstone and brick with some half-timbering. The original part has 1½ storeys, and the extension at the rear has two storeys. Facing the drive is a porch with wooden balustrading and a half-timbered gable, and facing the road is a jettied plastered gable. In the extension is a doorway, a bay window, and a half-timbered gable.	II
St Joseph's Church and presbytery 53.54268°N 2.63470°W		1878	A Roman Catholic church with attached presbytery to the right in polychromatic brick and with slate roofs. The church is in Early English style, and consists of a nave with a clerestory and aisles. The west front facing the street is gabled, it contains lancet windows, a blind arcade, a niche with a statue, corner pinnacles, and a bellcote with a mansard roof. Along the sides of the church are stepped lancets. The presbytery has three storeys, two bays, and sash windows, those on the top floor in blind arches.	II
12–20 Wallgate; 53.54573°N 2.63215°W	—	1880	A row of five shops with offices above. They are in brick with limestone dressings, and in Italianate style. There are three storeys, with rusticated quoins, and a moulded eaves cornice. On the ground floor are altered shop fronts, that of No. 20 in Art Deco style. On the upper floors are paired windows with alternate segmental and round heads.	II
Bandstand, Mesnes Park; 53.55276°N 2.63803°W		c. 1880 (probable)	The bandstand is in Mesnes Park, and has a sandstone plinth, cast iron columns, and a metal-clad wooden roof. There are ten sides, and at each corner is a column with a fluted base, a twisted shaft, and a crocketed capital. Pierced decorative brackets carry the swept roof that has a corona, a dome and a finial.	II
Double flight of steps (south-east); 53.55240°N 2.63653°W		c. 1880 (probable)	Two flights of steps, interrupted by a terrace, lead up from the south to The Pavilion in Mesnes Park. They are in sandstone, and are flanked by low walls with moulded coping.	II
Double flight of steps (south-west); 53.55242°N 2.63721°W		c. 1880 (probable)	Two flights of steps, interrupted by a terrace, lead up from the west to The Pavilion in Mesnes Park. They are in sandstone, and are flanked by low walls with moulded coping.	II
The Pavilion, Mesnes Park; 53.55261°N 2.63682°W		c. 1880 (probable)	The Pavilion is in Mesnes Park, and is in red brick, with some yellow brick, red and yellow terracotta tiles, a cast iron porch, and roof of felt tiles. It has an octagonal plan with two storeys, and single-storey five-sided wings on alternate sides, that on the southeast side being an open porch. The central part has square-headed windows on the ground floor and round-headed windows above, and in the wings are round-headed windows. On the top is a lantern with cast iron columns and glazing between, a two-stage swept roof, and a weathervane.	II
St Andrew's Church; 53.55276°N 2.64941°W		1882	The church is built in brick with slate roofs, and is in Early English style. It consists of a nave and chancel in one vessel with a clerestory, north and south aisles, north and south porches, a north chapel, and a south vestry and organ house. At the northwest is a square bell turret with a wooden-framed belfry, and a pyramidal cap with lucarnes and a weathervane.	II
Former Yorkshire Bank; 53.54561°N 2.63222°W		1884	The building is on a corner site, it has a ground floor in limestone, above it is in brick, and it has a mansard roof in green slate. There are three storeys with attics, a corner bay and two bays on each front. In the corner is a doorway with Ionic columns and foliated consoles carrying a segmental canopy. Above it is a bowed mullioned and transomed oriel window with a balustraded parapet, and at the top is a gable with a swan-neck pediment. On the Wallgate front is a doorway with a sandstone surround, above which is a canted oriel window.	II
Head Post Office; 53.54544°N 2.63246°W		1884	The post office has a sandstone ground floor, above it is in brick with sandstone dressings, and there is a hipped slate roof. The building has a moulded egg-and-dart cornice above the ground floor, and above is a sill band, a frieze, a dentilled cornice, and a gable over the left bay. There are three storeys and two bays. The doorway on the left has a fluted pilastered architrave and a swan-neck pediment. To the right is an elliptical-headed window and a two-light window. The upper floors contain sash windows, in the gable is an oculus, and on the coped gable is a finial.	II
Moothall Chambers; 53.54589°N 2.63205°W		1884	Shops with offices above, in sandstone with a modillioned cornice and a slate roof. The building has an irregular trapezoid plan on a corner site, and is in French Renaissance style. There are three storeys, and the main front has seven bays. On the ground floor are shop fronts and pilasters, and in the centre is a doorway with a segmental pediment. On the middle floor, the outer bays contain oriel windows, and between are square-headed windows with cornices on brackets. On the top floor the outer bays contain Venetian windows, and between are round-headed windows, all with keystones. All the windows are sashes.	II
Western No. 1 Mill, Swan Meadow Works; 53.54064°N 2.64070°W	—	1884	An integrated cotton mill by Stott and Sons in brick on a plinth of blue engineering brick, with sandstone dressings and internal cast iron beams. It has a four-storey spinning block with and incorporated engine house, corner pilasters, dentilled cornices, a coped parapet, and a balustraded upstand with a segmental pediment. The doorway has a pilastered surround, and the windows have segmental heads. There are also boiler houses and chimneys, reeling and winding rooms, and a weaving shed.	II
The Royal Court Theatre; 53.54414°N 2.63049°W		1886	The theatre was extended with a foyer in 1895, and has since been used for other purposes. It is in red brick with dressings in yellow brick and terracotta. There are three storeys with a two-storey foyer projecting at the front, and five bays. On the ground floor is a central round-headed doorway, flanked by recessed entrances and shop fronts. On the upper floor the central window has an elaborate architrave, with a broken pediment, above which is an oculus in a swan-necked architrave. The outer windows are round-headed with moulded surrounds and fluted pilasters, and at the top of the foyer is a dentilled cornice and a cast iron balustrade. On the top floor are four round-headed windows with mask-keystones, and a gable with a flaming urn finial flanked by balustrades.	II
Gerard Winstanley House; 53.54582°N 2.63391°W		1887–88	Originally magistrates' courts and a police station, later used for other purposes, the building is in red brick on a chamfered plinth, with sandstone dressings, moulded sill bands, and a slate roof. It is in Elizabethan style, with 2½ storeys, twelve bays, and one bay in the east return. On the front are four doorways with Tudor arched heads and mullioned fanlights, and the windows are mullioned and transomed. The gables are in two sizes, and they have finials. At the east corner is an elliptical-headed archway and a circular turret with a conical roof.	II
The Old Courts; 53.54564°N 2.63449°W		1888	The building, on a corner site, is in red brick with sandstone dressings, sill bands, and a slate roof. It is in Elizabethan style, with 2½ storeys, four bays on Crawford Street, and five in the left return on King Street West. In the second bay is an entrance that has a depressed arch with a chamfered surround and a moulded head, containing a doorway with a Tudor arched head and an inscribed tympanum. Most of the windows are mullioned and transomed, and there are stepped gables of differing sizes. On the corner is a canted turret with an embattled parapet and an octagonal roof with an open cupola and a finial. In the left return is a two-storey canted bay window.	II
Western No. 2 Mill, Swan Meadow Works; 53.53979°N 2.64134°W	—	1888	An integrated cotton mill by Stott and Sons in brick with some sandstone dressings and internal steel beams. It consists of a four-storey spinning block with corner pilasters, a dentilled cornice, a coped parapet, and a turret; two-storey beaming and winding rooms with two storeys and a basement; an engine house with a large Venetian-style window; a boiler house; and a chimney with a tapering octagonal shaft.	II
Former Royal Bank of Scotland; 53.54534°N 2.63250°W		1890	The former bank has a ground floor in polished granite, it is in red brick with sandstone dressings above, with a cornice above the ground floor, brick pilasters, a frieze with swags, and a dentilled cornice, and it has a hipped slate roof. The building is in free Renaissance style, and has three storeys with an attic, and three bays. On the ground floor is an arcade of four round-headed openings, and a round-headed entrance on the right. On the middle floor are three canted oriel windows with carved aprons, pulvinated friezes, dentilled cornices, and balustraded parapets. On the top floor are mullioned and transomed windows with central pediments, and at the top there is a cross-window in the central bay, and Venetian windows in the outer bays, all gabled.	II
47 King Street; 53.54390°N 2.63059°W		1891	Originally a bank, later offices, it has a front in sandstone, sides and rear in brick, a plain frieze, a dentilled and modillioned cornice, a balustraded parapet and a slate roof. The building has a rectangular plan, two storeys with a basement to the rear, and four bays. The ground floor is rusticated, and on the upper floor are Corinthian columns. Steps lead up to a flat-headed doorway that has an architrave and a pediment, and above it is a Venetian window. The ground floor windows have flat heads with voussoirs and cartouche keystones, and the upper floor windows have segmental heads and balustrades.	II
St Mark's Church; 53.53735°N 2.65556°W		1891–92	The chancel and vestry were added in 1901, and the belfry stage of the tower in 1927. The church is in sandstone with slate roofs, and is in Early English style with Arts and Crafts motifs. It consists of a nave with a clerestory, north and south aisles, a south porch, a south transept, a chancel with a north vestry, and a southeast tower. The tower has three stages, a polygonal southeast stair turret, and an embattled parapet.	II
St Matthew's Church; 53.52924°N 2.67257°W		1892–1894	The church was designed by Paley, Austin and Paley in Early English style, and altered in 1910 by Austin and Paley. It is in Runcorn sandstone with a red tiled roof, and consists of a nave with a clerestory, north and south aisles, a north porch, north and south transepts, a chancel, and a steeple at the crossing. The steeple has a two-stage tower with clasping pilasters, a northeast stair turret, a parapet stepped up at the corners, and a recessed octagonal spire with lucarnes.	II*
Victoria Hotel; 53.54452°N 2.63321°W		1894	The hotel is in stuccoed brick with stone dressings, a parapet and a slate roof. There are three storeys with cellars, a U-shaped plan with rear extensions, and a front of eight bays. The ground floor is rusticated, above it are pilasters between the bays, bands between the floors, and a dentilled cornice. In the third bay is a Tuscan porch with a dentilled cornice, a balustraded parapet with ball finials, and an elliptical-headed doorway flanked by pilasters. The windows are sashes with moulded architraves, scrolled feet and dentilled cornices. Redeveloped by The Heaton Group in 2016, the building is now apartments.	II
Former Midland Bank; 53.54575°N 2.63173°W		1895	The building is on a corner site. It is in red brick, the ground floor has been replaced with sandstone, and it has dressings in pink and buff terracotta and a slate mansard roof with a copper dome on the corner. There are three storeys with attics, On the ground floor are rectangular windows, pairs of Tuscan semi-columns, a frieze, and a modillioned cornice. On the corner is a doorway with a moulded architrave and a frieze with festoons. On the upper floors are windows of various shapes with keystones and voussoirs, and shaped gables. (Note: Street View in October 2016 showed that the building is no longer occupied by the Midland Bank.)	II
Entrance block, Wallgate Station; 53.54476°N 2.63312°W		1896	The railway station block was built by the Lancashire and Yorkshire Railway, and consists of a booking hall and office with a large porte-cochère at the front. The block is in red brick with sandstone dressings and a slate roof. There are two storeys, a central range of three bays, flanked by two-bay canted wings with hipped roofs. On the ground floor is an arcade of entrances and windows, and on the upper floor are mullioned windows. The porte-cochère has three bays and cast iron columns with open-work foliated brackets carrying a glass canopy.	II
13–23 Swinley Lane, 39 Walkden Avenue East and wall 53.55479°N 2.63118°W		1897	A row of seven houses, mainly in red brick, partly stuccoed, with terracotta dressings, some timber framing, and slate roofs with red ridge tiles. They have 2½ storeys with cellars, a double-depth plan, two or three bays each, and rear extensions. The external designs are very varied; all have doorways with fanlights, most of the windows are sashes, the other features include gables, some jettied, some with ball finials, Venetian windows, eyebrow dormers, a polygonal two-storey oriel window, bay windows, some canted, some square, and oculi. At the front is a brick wall with terracotta coping and brick gate piers.	II
National Westminster Bank; 53.54706°N 2.63099°W		1898	Designed by William Owen for Parr's Bank, the building is in sandstone on a plinth of polished granite, and has a slate roof. It is in French Renaissance style, and has a long rectangular plan. There are three storeys with an attic, three bays, pilasters, dentilled cornices on the ground and middle floors, a moulded cornice on the upper floor, and a tall pedimented gable in the centre, with finials. In the centre of the ground floor is a semicircular three-light window, and a square-headed doorway to the right with an oculus above. On the middle floor is a bowed and decorative balcony and cross-windows flanked by oculi in swan-necked pedimented architraves. On the top floor are cross-windows, and the attic contains a two-light mullioned window.	II
The Clarence Hotel; 53.54508°N 2.63263°W		1898	A public house in red brick with terracotta dressings, a ground floor cornice, terracotta bands, a modillioned cornice with egg-and-dart decoration, a balustraded parapet, and a slate roof. It is in Artisan Mannerist style, and has three storeys and a symmetrical front of three bays. The middle bay projects forward and contains an open porch with polished granite Doric columns, a segmental canopy, and a doorway with a moulded surround. Above this is a mullioned and transomed window, an inscribed panel, a pendant lamp bracket, and a four-light mullioned window. In the outer bays are windows of varying types.	II
The Swan and Railway Hotel; 53.54393°N 2.63386°W		1898	A house, later a public house, in brick with terracotta dressings and a green slate roof, and in Scottish baronial style. It has a rectangular plan at right angles to the street, there are three storeys with attics, and a front of two bays. On the ground floor is a square headed doorway with a fanlight, flanked by windows. On the upper floors are two-storey semicircular oriel windows, a modillion cornice, and gables with lancet windows and finials.	II
Tower Buildings and Station Chambers; 53.54413°N 2.63370°W		1898	A range of shops with offices above by Bradshaw & Gass in free Baroque style. It is in brick with terracotta facing and dressings, and a slate roof. There are three storeys with attics and eight bays. On the ground floor are modern shop fronts, with a wagon entrance in the first bay, and above are pilasters rising to small turrets. In the sixth bay is a doorway that has a segmental pediment and a fanlight, and above it is a square four-stage turret with a dentilled cornice. In five of the bays are two-storey shallow canted oriel windows with balustrades, and the other bays contain bow windows on the middle floor.	II
Municipal Buildings; 53.54545°N 2.63029°W		1900	Originally a commercial building by Bradshaw & Gass, later extended and used as municipal offices, it is in red brick, mainly faced with red terracotta, and has a green slate roof. The building is in Flemish Renaissance style, on a corner site, with three storeys, seven bays on Hewlett Street and three on Library Street. It is elaborately decorated, and its features include a dentilled cornice, foliated terracotta panels, balustraded parapets, shaped gables, an entrance with a segmental arch and bow windows above, two-storey canted oriel windows, fluted pilasters, and mullioned and transomed windows. In the corner is a turret.	II
Western No. 3 Mill, Swan Meadow Works; 53.53945°N 2.63934°W		1900	A cotton mill by Stott and Sons in brick with sandstone dressings and internal reinforced concrete floors and steel joists. It consists of a four-storey spinning block with panelled corner pilasters, segmental-headed windows, and an entrance tower rising two stages above the parapet, with bands, a balustraded parapet, a pyramidal roof, and a doorway with a pediment; an engine house with a large Venetian-style window; a single-storey boiler house; a beaming block with three unequal storeys, and a chimney with a tapering octagonal shaft.	II
Town Hall; 53.54502°N 2.63013°W		1900–1903	Originally the Mining and Technical College, the building was extended in 1928. It is in red brick with terracotta dressings and green slate roofs. It has two storeys, a basement and attics, and a symmetrical entrance front of five bays, the centre and outer bays gabled. Steps lead up to a central porch with blocked Ionic columns, a frieze, a dentilled cornice and a segmental broken pediment containing a cartouche. At the top is a modillioned cornice, the central gable has finials, and the outer gables are flanked by cupolas with colonnades. At the front are Art Nouveau railings with square banded gate piers.	II
The Pagefield Hotel; 53.55243°N 2.64349°W	—	1902	Former hotel and later public house, now converted to residential use; brick with sandstone dressings, a chamfered sill band, a cornice, and a slate roof. It has an L-shaped plan and is in free Renaissance style. There are three storeys and fronts of five bays on Park Road and two on Gidlow Lane. On the corners are five-sided turrets with domes. On the Park Road front are three bays with pedimented gables and balustrades between. The doorway has an architrave with pilasters, an ogival pediment, and a lettered lintel. Elsewhere on this front are mullioned and transomed windows, two shallow canted oriel windows, and two oeil-de-boeuf windows. On the Gidlow Lane front is a canted two-storey bay window, and to the right is an Ionic porch with a balustraded parapet.	II
The Springfield public house 53.55416°N 2.64786°W		1903	The public house is in red brick with dressings in orange terracotta and faience and has a slate roof. It has an L-shaped plan and is in free Renaissance style. The main block has three storeys and a symmetrical front of three bays, with a single-storey extension to the left. The outer bays contain two-storey canted bay windows with sash windows and shaped gables above. The central doorway has attached Ionic columns, a moulded round head with voussoirs, above which is an inscribed panel with a broken swan-necked pediment, a sash window, and an oculus. The left extension has a canted bay window and a hipped roof. In the right return is a similar doorway, a shaped gable and, to the right, a polygonal turret with a lead-roofed cupola.	II
26, 27, 30 and 32 Market Place and 1–5 Market Street; 53.54638°N 2.63200°W		1904	A block of shops with offices above curving round a corner site. It is in red brick with sandstone dressings, timber framing on the upper floor, and a red tiled roof. There are three storeys, three bays on each street and three on the curved corner. On the ground floor are modern shop fronts. The middle floor contains windows that have architraves with blocked columns. The top floor in the curved corner contains a Baroque turret with a round-headed window. The side ranges are timber framed and slightly jettied, and contain shallow canted oriel windows, brattished bressumers, gables with bargeboards, and finials.	II
Gatehouse, offices and winding rooms, Swan Meadow Works; 53.54129°N 2.63957°W		1904	The building is in red glazed brick with terracotta dressings and a hipped slate roof. There are two storeys and an entrance front of 13 bays. On the front are bands, and a parapet, partly balustraded, with upstands. The doorway has an architrave with panelled pilasters, consoles, a lettered frieze, a cornice with egg-and-dart decoration, and a broken segmental pediment. Most of the windows are square-headed with architraves and triple keystones. In the left return is an oriel window.	II
The Raven Hotel; 53.54566°N 2.63181°W		1904	A public house in red brick with sandstone dressings, a ground floor cornice, a higher cornice with egg-and-dart decoration, and a slate roof. It is in Edwardian Baroque style, and has three storeys with cellars, and two unequal bays. In the narrow left bay is a doorway with a pedimented concave upstand, and to the right is a four-light window, all in a continuous architrave. Above is a two-storey oriel window surmounted by a shaped parapet, and over this is a large semicircular pediment containing a raven in relief and lettering, flanked by ball finials.	II
34 Market Place; 53.54647°N 2.63176°W	—	1905	A shop with offices above, the lower part in brick with sandstone dressings, the upper parts timber framed, and with a red tiled roof. It has a long rectangular plan, with three storeys and one bay. On the ground floor is a modern shop front, and the middle floor contains an arcaded three-light window with colonettes. The top floor is jettied, and contains a ten-light oriel window, the gable above is further jettied, with a brattished bressumer, bargeboards and a finial.	II
Griffin Hotel; 53.54973°N 2.62913°W		1905	The former public house is in red brick, with dressings in red and buff terracotta, and has a hipped green slate roof. It is in Edwardian Baroque style, with three storeys and an attic, a double-depth plan, and three bays. On the ground floor is a segmental-arched doorway with panelled pilasters, and a decorative lintel with a keystone. In the outer bays are rectangular windows with separated keystones, and above is a moulded cornice. Over the doorway is a transomed window flanked by columns, above it is a decorative cornice, and higher is a modillioned cornice and a flat-roofed dormer. The outer bays contain oriel windows with shaped pediments, flanked by giant Ionic semi-columns, and above them are sash windows, and modillioned semicircular gables.	II
Prudential Assurance Building; 53.54556°N 2.63095°W		1905	The office is in red brick with terracotta dressings, and moulded cornices, the top one with egg-and-dart decoration. There are three storeys and four bays. In the left bay is a doorway with a semicircular head, a moulded surround including decoration with flowers, and an Art Nouveau name plate. To the right are four windows with semicircular cusped heads and hood moulds with finals. Above in the middle bays are two-storey canted oriel windows. At the top, the middle two bays have shaped gables, and the outer bays have balustraded parapets.	II
36 and 38 Market Place; 53.54650°N 2.63166°W	—	1906	Two shops with offices above, the lower part in brick with sandstone dressings, the upper parts timber framed, and with a red tiled roof. It has a long rectangular plan, with three storeys and two bays. On the ground floor are two modern shop fronts, and the middle floor contains rectangular windows with false triple keystones. The top floor is jettied, and contains shallow canted oriel windows, brattished bressumers, gables with bargeboards, and finials.	II
Queens Hall Methodist Mission (entrance block); 53.54752°N 2.63329°W		1906	The entrance block of a concert hall that has been demolished, designed by Bradshaw & Gass in Edwardian Baroque style. It is in red brick with stone dressings and a slate roof. There are two storeys with an attic, a two-stage turret, and a symmetrical front of five bays. It has giant pilasters, a pulvinated frieze, a modillioned cornice, and the turret has a domed Baroque upper stage. On the middle floor are mullioned and transomed windows with moulded architraves and open segmental pediments, the central one with Ionic columns, and on the top floor are casement windows.	II
Carnegie Library; 53.53622°N 2.66567°W		1907	The library was built with a grant from Andrew Carnegie, and has since been converted into offices. It is in red brick with buff terracotta dressings and a slate roof. There are two storeys with an attic, and a symmetrical entrance front of five bays. The middle three bays project forward, and contain panelled pilasters, an egg-and-dart frieze, and a pedimented gable containing an oculus with festoons. In the centre is a doorway with Tuscan columns and a segmental head, and above it is a cartouche with flanking panels containing lettering. The outer bays have two-light windows with open pediments, and oculi above.	II
Trencherfield Mill; 53.54122°N 2.63786°W		1907–08	A cotton spinning mill, later used for other purposes, it has an iron and steel frame, and walls in red brick with buff terracotta dressings. The main block has four storeys and about 15 bays, a tower at the northeast, and an engine house and a boiler house at the south. The tower has a three-stage turret and a steep pyramidal roof. The engine house has three storeys and eight bays, and contains round-headed windows, oculi, and a large lunette, and inside is a working steam engine.	II
Powell monument, Mesnes Park; 53.55172°N 2.63529°W		1910	The monument, which stands in Mesnes Park, was designed by Ernest Gillick, and commemorates Sir Francis Sharp Powell a local Member of Parliament. The base is in grey granite, and consists of three wide square steps and a cubic pedestal, on which is a bronze life-size statue depicting Sir Francis sitting in a chair. On three sides of the pedestal are bronze plaques, inscribed and with bas-relief figures. The monument is in an enclosure with granite piers with bronze caps at the corners. Local tradition says rubbing his bronze foot brings good luck. This wore it down over time, creating a hole in the shoe, which was professionally restored.	II
St Paul's Church; 53.52789°N 2.65353°W		1913–1915	The church is in sandstone with a red tiled roof, and is in Perpendicular style. It consists of a nave, north and south aisles, a chancel with a south chapel and a north vestry and a west tower. The tower has three stages, angle buttresses, a west window, a clock face, and a traceried stepped parapet. The east window has five lights.	II
Former workers' welfare building, Swan Meadow Works; 53.53931°N 2.64113°W		c. 1920	The building is in glazed red brick with buff terracotta dressings and slate roofs. It is in Edwardian Baroque style with one storey and roofs are differing heights. Features on the south front include a large Venetian window, a frieze, a cornice, a high parapet with an upstand containing lettering, two large doorway with panelled lintels containing lettering, and two large terracotta arches.	II
War memorial 53.54574°N 2.63252°W		1925	The war memorial, designed by George Gilbert Scott in the style of an Eleanor cross, is in a triangular garden to the south of All Saints' Church. It is in Portland stone, and has a three-stage plinth with bronze plaques on the upper two stages containing inscriptions and the names of those lost in the World Wars. On the plinth is a tall octagonal pillar and a lantern carved with detailed tracery and surmounted by a corona and a cross. The garden is surrounded by dwarf walls with railings, and at the corners are entrances with lamp standards.	II*
St Stephen's Church, Whelley; 53.55539°N 2.61607°W		1930–1938	The church was designed by Austin and Paley in free Perpendicular style. It is built in sandstone with a green slate roof, and consists of a nave and chancel in one vessel with a clerestory, a west baptistry, north and south aisles, a south porch, and a south vestry. The chancel has a canted east end with a parapet and a five-light window. At the east end of the vestry is a large gabled bellcote.	II
Telephone kiosk adjacent to The Royal Albert Edward Infirmary; 53.55789°N 2.62889°W	—	1935	A K6 type telephone kiosk, designed by Giles Gilbert Scott, adjacent to The Royal Albert Edward Infirmary. It is constructed in cast iron with a square plan, shallow domes, and unperforated crowns in the top panels.	II
Telephone kiosk adjacent to The Springfield public house 53.55410°N 2.64790°W	—	1935	A K6 type telephone kiosk, designed by Giles Gilbert Scott, adjacent to The Springfield public house. It is constructed in cast iron with a square plan, shallow domes, and unperforated crowns in the top panels.	II
Telephone kiosks in front of Post Office; 53.54545°N 2.63243°W		1935	Two K6 type telephone kiosks, designed by Giles Gilbert Scott, in front of the Post Office. They are constructed in cast iron with a square plan, shallow domes, and unperforated crowns in the top panels.	II
Mesnes Building, Wigan College; 53.55032°N 2.63484°W		1935–1937	Originally a grammar school and later part of Wigan College, the building is in brick with red tiles and pantile roofs. It is in Modernist style, and has a U-shaped plan, consisting of three two-storey ranges enclosing a forecourt, and a tower at the east corner. The tower has a narrow doorway, a curved concrete balcony, lancet windows, octagonal clock faces, and a top stage with pilasters and a parapet.	II
Adam Viaduct; 53.54098°N 2.64765°W		1946	The viaduct was built by the London, Midland and Scottish Railway to carry its line over the River Douglas, replacing an earlier structure. It has reinforced pre-stressed pre-cast deck units on reinforced concrete piers on old foundations, and is the earliest pre-stressed railway bridge in England.	II
St. Jude's Church, Wigan; 53.52629°N 2.64746°W		1963–64	A Roman Catholic church in reinforced concrete and brick, it has a plan of an isosceles triangle with the corners squared off. The entrance porch has fanlights and side lights, and above is a six-light window. Fanning from the porch are side walls containing windows of dalle de verre glass, and on the roof is a clerestory lighting the altar. On front of the entrance porch is a circular baptistry, on which is a clerestory of dalle de verre glass and this is surmounted by four tapering concrete fins holding a pole with a cross.	II

== Notes and references ==
=== Sources ===
- Historic England, "Milestone set in boundary wall to north-east of The Elms, Wigan (1384573)", National Heritage List for England
- Historic England, "Stump of old boundary cross in school yard, Wigan (1384565)", National Heritage List for England
- Historic England, "Mab's Cross, Wigan (1384526)", National Heritage List for England
- Historic England, "Church of All Saints, Wigan (1384556)", National Heritage List for England
- Historic England, "Boundary wall and two archways to west and south sides of churchyard of Church of All Saints, Wigan (1384557)", National Heritage List for England
- Historic England, "No. 48 Millgate, Wigan (1384499)", National Heritage List for England
- Historic England, "Nos. 4–14 The Wiend, Wigan (1384536)", National Heritage List for England
- Historic England, "Beech Hill Farm, including wall to street, Wigan (1384452)", National Heritage List for England
- Historic England, "Whitesmith's Arms public house, Wigan (1384515)", National Heritage List for England
- Historic England, "Tyldesley monument, Wigan (1384574)", National Heritage List for England
- Historic England, "John Bull Chophouse, Wigan (1384460)", National Heritage List for England
- Historic England, "Nos. 54 and 56 Wallgate, Wigan (1384552)", National Heritage List for England
- Historic England, "Section of churchyard wall to north east of Church of All Saints, Wigan (1384560)", National Heritage List for England
- Historic England, "Gate piers at north entrance to churchyard of Church of All Saints, Wigan (1384558)", National Heritage List for England
- Historic England, "No. 11 Market Place and No. 2 The Wiend, Wigan (1384487)", National Heritage List for England
- Historic England, "Nos. 5, 7 and 9 The Wiend, Wigan (1384537)", National Heritage List for England
- Historic England, "No. 704 Warrington Road, Wigan (1384566)", National Heritage List for England
- Historic England, "Old Bluecoat School, Wigan (1384454)", National Heritage List for England
- Historic England, "Section of wall bounding churchyard of Church of All Saints on south, Wigan (1384561)", National Heritage List for England
- Historic England, "No. 134 Standishgate, Wigan (1384520)", National Heritage List for England
- Historic England, "No. 136 Standishgate with attached wall to the left, Wigan (1384521)", National Heritage List for England
- Historic England, "No. 138 Standishgate, Wigan (1384522)", National Heritage List for England
- Historic England, "Royal Oak Hotel, Wigan (1384518)", National Heritage List for England
- Historic England, "No. 706 Warrington Road, Wigan (1384567)", National Heritage List for England
- Historic England, "Bridge Warehouse at east end of Leeds-Liverpool Canal Basin, Wigan (1384555)", National Heritage List for England
- Historic England, "Church of St George, Wigan (1384568)", National Heritage List for England
- Historic England, "Nos. 7, 9 and 11 King Street, Wigan (1384473)", National Heritage List for England
- Historic England, "Nos. 13 and 15 King Street, Wigan (1384474)", National Heritage List for England
- Historic England, "Nos. 21, 23 and 25 King Street, Wigan (1384475)", National Heritage List for England
- Historic England, "Nos. 7, 9 and 11 King Street, Wigan (1384473)", National Heritage List for England
- Historic England, "Westwood Estate Office, Wigan (1384509)", National Heritage List for England
- Historic England, "The Bees Knees public house, Wigan (1384545)", National Heritage List for England
- Historic England, "Lock No. 21 on Leeds-Liverpool Canal, Wigan (1380074)", National Heritage List for England
- Historic England, "Lock No. 23 on Leeds-Liverpool Canal, Wigan (1380075)", National Heritage List for England
- Historic England, "Pottery Bridge, Wigan (1384507)", National Heritage List for England
- Historic England, "Church of St Mary, Wigan (1384525)", National Heritage List for England
- Historic England, "Church of St John, Wigan (1384523)", National Heritage List for England
- Historic England, "Blairs public house, Wigan (1384546)", National Heritage List for England
- Historic England, "St John's Club, Wigan (1384516)", National Heritage List for England
- Historic England, "No. 1 New Lodge, Wigan (1384500)", National Heritage List for England
- Historic England, "The Elms, Wigan (1384572)", National Heritage List for England
- Historic England, "Church of St John the Divine, Wigan (1384458)", National Heritage List for England
- Historic England, "Boundary wall and gateways to south and west of Church of St John the Divine, Wigan (1384459)", National Heritage List for England
- Historic England, "Nos. 17–33 Dicconson Street and Nos. 1, 3 and 5 Upper Dicconson Street, Wigan (1384463)", National Heritage List for England
- Historic England, "No. 7 Upper Dicconson Street, Wigan (1384538)", National Heritage List for England
- Historic England, "Cottage adjoining Henhurst Lock, with attached stable to rear, Wigan (1384457)", National Heritage List for England
- Historic England, "Railway bridge, Wigan (1384466)", National Heritage List for England
- Historic England, "Church of St Catherine, Wigan (1384484)", National Heritage List for England
- Historic England, "Boundary wall of churchyard of Church of St Catherine, Wigan (1384485)", National Heritage List for England
- Historic England, "No. 4 Lansdowne Terrace, Wigan (1384465)", National Heritage List for England
- Historic England, "Gateway and lodges to Haigh Hall Park, Wigan (1384570)", National Heritage List for England
- Historic England, "St Catherine's Vicarage, Wigan (1384486)", National Heritage List for England
- Historic England, "Nos. 26–34 King Street, Wigan (1384477)", National Heritage List for England
- Historic England, "Walmesley monument in front of Church of St John, Wigan (1384524)", National Heritage List for England
- Historic England, "Church of St James with St Thomas, Wigan (1384468)", National Heritage List for England
- Historic England, "Pagefield Building of Wigan College of Technology, Wigan (1384455)", National Heritage List for England
- Historic England, "Canal Cottages Nos. 4 and 5 Pottery Road, with attached boundary wall, Wigan (1384506)", National Heritage List for England
- Historic England, "Former National Westminster Bank, Wigan (1384472)", National Heritage List for England
- Historic England, "Grimes Arcade Building, Wigan (1384476)", National Heritage List for England
- Historic England, "Coops Factory, Wigan (1384464)", National Heritage List for England
- Historic England, "Royal Albert Edward Infirmary, with attached kitchen to rear, Wigan (1384571)", National Heritage List for England
- Historic England, "Church of St Michael, Wigan (1384535)", National Heritage List for England
- Historic England, "Nos. 2–20 Swinley Road, Wigan (1384533)", National Heritage List for England
- Historic England, "Wigan Hall, Wigan (1384501)", National Heritage List for England
- Historic England, "Gatehouse to Wigan Hall with attached boundary wall, Wigan (1384502)", National Heritage List for England
- Historic England, "Railings encircling Church of All Saints to south and west, Wigan (1384559)", National Heritage List for England
- Historic England, "Terrace walls and steps forming west boundary to garden of Wigan Hall, Wigan (1384503)", National Heritage List for England
- Historic England, "Nos. 5–15 Swinley Road, Wigan (1384534)", National Heritage List for England
- Historic England, "No. 21 Upper Dicconson Street, Wigan (1384539)", National Heritage List for England
- Historic England, "Wigan History Shop and Careers Office, Wigan (1384510)", National Heritage List for England
- Historic England, "Entrance gateway to Mesnes Park, Wigan (1384497)", National Heritage List for England
- Historic England, "Entrance lodge to Mesnes Park, Wigan (1384498)", National Heritage List for England
- Historic England, "Church of St Joseph with No. 11 Caroline Street (attached presbytery), Wigan (1384456)", National Heritage List for England
- Historic England, "Nos. 12–20 Wallgate, Wigan (1384543)", National Heritage List for England
- Historic England, "Bandstand, Wigan (1384492)", National Heritage List for England
- Historic England, "Double flight of steps to south of The Pavilion, Wigan (1384496)", National Heritage List for England
- Historic England, "Double flight of steps to west of The Pavilion, Wigan (1384495)", National Heritage List for England
- Historic England, "The Pavilion, Wigan (1384494)", National Heritage List for England
- Historic England, "Church of St Andrew, Wigan (1384569)", National Heritage List for England
- Historic England, "Moothall Chambers, Wigan (1384542)", National Heritage List for England
- Historic England, "Former Yorkshire Bank, Wigan (1384544)", National Heritage List for England
- Historic England, "Head Post Office, Wigan (1384547)", National Heritage List for England
- Historic England, "Swan Meadow works, Western No. 1 Mill, Wigan (1384527)", National Heritage List for England
- Historic England, "The Royal Court Theatre, Wigan (1384479)", National Heritage List for England
- Historic England, "Gerard Winstanley House (former Magistrates Court and Police Station), Wigan (1384462)", National Heritage List for England
- Historic England, "County Court and Inland Revenue Office, Wigan (1384461)", National Heritage List for England
- Historic England, "Swan Meadow works, Western No. 2 Mill, Wigan (1384528)", National Heritage List for England
- Historic England, "The Royal Bank of Scotland, Wigan (1384549)", National Heritage List for England
- Historic England, "No. 47 King Street, Wigan (1384478)", National Heritage List for England
- Historic England, "Church of St Mark, Wigan (1384540)", National Heritage List for England
- Historic England, "Church of St Matthew, Wigan (1384453)", National Heritage List for England
- Historic England, "Victoria Hotel, Wigan (1384551)", National Heritage List for England
- Historic England, "Midland Bank, Wigan (1384481)", National Heritage List for England
- Historic England, "Wallgate Station entrance block, Wigan (1384563)", National Heritage List for England
- Historic England, "Nos. 13–23 Swinley Lane and No. 39 Walkden Avenue East with attached boundary wall, Wigan (1384532)", National Heritage List for England
- Historic England, "National Westminster Bank, Wigan (1384514)", National Heritage List for England
- Historic England, "The Clarence Hotel, Wigan (1384550)", National Heritage List for England
- Historic England, "The Swan and Railway Hotel, Wigan (1384554)", National Heritage List for England
- Historic England, "Tower Buildings and Station Chambers, Wigan (1384553)", National Heritage List for England
- Historic England, "Municipal Buildings, Wigan (1384469)", National Heritage List for England
- Historic England, "Swan Meadow works, Western No. 3 Mill, Wigan (1384529)", National Heritage List for England
- Historic England, "Town Hall (formerly Wigan and District Mining and Technical College) and railings, Wigan (1384483)", National Heritage List for England
- Historic England, "The Pagefield Hotel, Wigan (1384467)", National Heritage List for England
- Historic England, "The Springfield public house, Wigan (1384512)", National Heritage List for England
- Historic England, "Nos. 26, 27, 30 and 32 34 Market Place and Nos. 1–5 Market Street, Wigan (1384488)", National Heritage List for England
- Historic England, "Swan Meadow works, gatehouse, offices and attached winding rooms, Wigan (1384531)", National Heritage List for England
- Historic England, "The Raven Hotel, Wigan (1384541)", National Heritage List for England
- Historic England, "No. 34 Market Place, Wigan (1384489)", National Heritage List for England
- Historic England, "Griffin Hotel, Wigan (1384517)", National Heritage List for England
- Historic England, "Prudential Assurance Building, Wigan (1384482)", National Heritage List for England
- Historic England, "Nos. 36 and 38 Market Place, Wigan (1384490)", National Heritage List for England
- Historic England, "Queens Hall Methodist Mission (entrance block only), Wigan (1384491)", National Heritage List for England
- Historic England, "Carnegie Library, Wigan (1384504)", National Heritage List for England
- Historic England, "Trencherfield Mill, Wigan (1384508)", National Heritage List for England
- Historic England, "Powell monument, Wigan (1384493)", National Heritage List for England
- Historic England, "Church of St Paul, Wigan (1384511)", National Heritage List for England
- Historic England, "Swan Meadow works, former workers' welfare building, Wigan (1384530)", National Heritage List for England
- Historic England, "War memorial south of Church of All Saints, with encircling railings, Wigan (1384562)", National Heritage List for England
- Historic England, "Church of St Stephen, Wigan (1384470)", National Heritage List for England
- Historic England, "Pair of K6 telephone kiosks outside Head Post Office, Wigan (1384548)", National Heritage List for England
- Historic England, "Telephone kiosk adjacent to The Springfield public house, Wigan (1384513)", National Heritage List for England
- Historic England, "Telephone kiosk adjacent to The Royal Albert Edward Infirmary, Wigan (1061328)", National Heritage List for England
- Historic England, "Mesnes Building of Wigan College, Wigan (1384505)", National Heritage List for England
- Historic England, "Adam Viaduct, Wigan (1061327)", National Heritage List for England
- Historic England, "St Jude's Roman Catholic Church, Wigan (1413107)", National Heritage List for England
- Historic England, Listed Buildings
- Pollard, Richard; Pevsner, Nikolaus (2006), Lancashire: Liverpool and the South-West, The Buildings of England, New Haven and London: Yale University Press, ISBN 0-300-10910-5
