= Pagefield Hotel =

Listed former pub in Wigan, Greater Manchester, England

- Location within Greater Manchester
- Alternative names: Famous Pagefield

General information
- Status: Converted to residential use
- Type: Public house (former)
- Architectural style: Free Renaissance
- Location: 168 Gidlow Lane, Wigan, Greater Manchester, England
- Coordinates: 53.5525°N 2.6436°W
- Year built: 1902; 124 years ago
- Closed: 2015 (as a pub)
- Client: Magee Marshall & Co

Design and construction
- Architects: Heaton, Ralph and Heaton
- Designations

Listed Building – Grade II
- Official name: The Pagefield Hotel
- Designated: 8 December 1999
- Reference no.: 1384467

The Pagefield Hotel (also known as the Famous Pagefield) is a Grade II listed former public house on Gidlow Lane in Wigan, Greater Manchester, England. Built in 1902 for the Bolton brewery Magee Marshall & Co and designed by Heaton, Ralph and Heaton, it is noted for its interior, which the Campaign for Real Ale (CAMRA) rates as of "special national historic importance". After closing in 2015, the building and its former bowling green have been the subject of successive residential redevelopment proposals, including a scheme approved in 2018 and a further application submitted in 2024 for new housing on the site.

== History ==
The building was constructed in 1902, according to its official listing, a date shown in the stair‑window glazing. It was designed and built by the architects Heaton, Ralph and Heaton for the Bolton brewery Magee Marshall & Co. The 1908 and 1929 Ordnance Survey maps mark the building as the Pagefield Hotel.

According to the Campaign for Real Ale (CAMRA), the name Famous Pagefield derives from a visit by Queen Elizabeth, who is said to have opened the public house while in Wigan, although no other sources confirm the claim. Queen Elizabeth visited the town on several occasions in 1938, 1940, 1945 and 1959, but none of these visits is linked in contemporary records to the building.

On 8 December 1999, the Pagefield Hotel was designated a Grade II listed building. The interior is recognised by CAMRA with a one‑star rating, indicating its status as of "special national historic importance".

The pub closed in early 2015. The local news website Wigan Today later reported an initial application proposed converting the ground floor into a retail or restaurant unit with eight apartments above, but no matching record appears on Wigan Council's planning website. A further planning application and accompanying listed building consent was submitted to the council in August 2016 seeking to convert the Pagefield Hotel into ten apartments, with nine two‑storey houses on the former bowling green, a three‑storey block of 12 further apartments, and on‑site parking for 56 cars with cycle provision. Permission was granted in March 2018. In 2024 the developer submitted a new application for the former bowling green site, proposing the construction of 19 mews houses in three separate blocks. As of November 2026 there has been no further update.

== Architecture ==
The building is constructed of red brick with stone detailing and a slate roof. It has an L‑shaped layout, with the main section set on the corner and a wing extending to the left. The design follows a Free Renaissance style. The structure has three storeys and five bays. At the corner are two five‑sided turrets that project from the first floor and are topped with domed roofs. The first, third and fifth bays have gabled tops, with short balustrades linking them above the slightly recessed second and fourth bays.

The ground floor includes a tall central entrance with side windows, set within a decorative surround and topped by a shaped pediment carrying the inscription "MAGEE MARSHALL & CO / PAGEFIELD / HOTEL". Other openings include a group of arched windows and larger multi‑paned windows. The upper floors mainly feature similar multi‑light windows, with shallow oriel windows on the top floor of the end bays. The second bay has a round window on each upper floor. Some of the upper panes contain Art Nouveau stained glass. Stone panels below the first‑floor windows of the outer bays display the initials "M. M. & CO LTD". The right‑hand side facing Gidlow Lane has two bays, including a two‑storey bay window and a doorway with a small Ionic porch and balustraded parapet. The left side and rear wing are simpler in design and include an additional entrance.

== See also ==
- Listed buildings in Wigan
- Listed pubs in Greater Manchester
