= Dog and Partridge =

Listed pub in Wigan, Greater Manchester, England

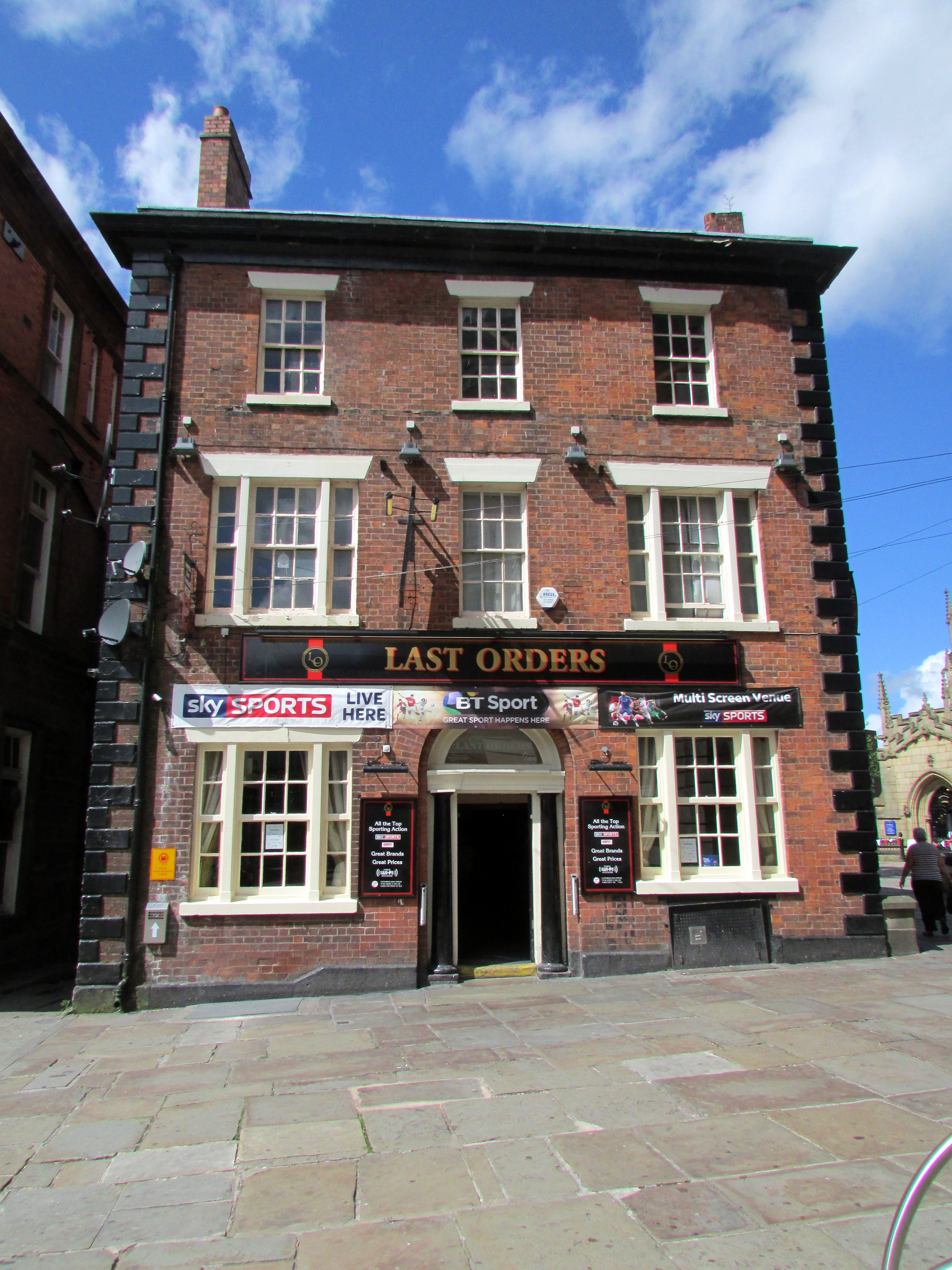
- The pub in 2014, trading as Last Orders

- Location within Greater Manchester
- Former names: Bees Knees; Last Orders

General information
- Type: Public house
- Architectural style: Georgian
- Location: 26 Wallgate, Wigan, Greater Manchester, England
- Coordinates: 53.5456°N 2.6325°W
- Year built: Late 18th or early 19th century

Design and construction
- Designations

Listed Building – Grade II
- Official name: Public house
- Designated: 11 July 1983
- Reference no.: 1384545

The Dog and Partridge (officially listed simply as "Public house") is a Grade II listed public house on Wallgate in Wigan, Greater Manchester, England. Built in the late 18th or early 19th century, the pub has traded under several names, including the reported early name Dog and Partridge, later the Bees Knees and Last Orders, before ultimately reverting to its original name.

== History ==
The building was constructed in the late 18th or early 19th century, according to its official listing. The 1894 and 1942 Ordnance Survey maps mark the building as a hotel with no attributed name. It was reportedly known as the Dog and Partridge in its early history, though the sources do not record whether this name dates from its construction or when it first came into use.

On 11 July 1983, the pub, then trading as the Bees Knees, was designated a Grade II listed building. Following its period as the Bees Knees, the pub was renamed Last Orders. It has since reverted to its earlier name, Dog and Partridge. The pub stands adjacent to Wigan War Memorial, which is in the churchyard of All Saints' Church; both are Grade II* listed.

== Architecture ==
The building is constructed of red brick with stone detailing and has a slate roof. It has a symmetrical front with three storeys and three windows, and its layout includes a rear extension. The style dates from the Georgian period.

The main entrance is a tall arched doorway with Tuscan columns, a panelled door and a fanlight above. Large sash windows flank the doorway on the ground floor, with matching windows directly above them on the first floor and smaller sash windows on the top floor. All the windows sit on raised sills.

Both side walls contain sash windows, and the left side also has a doorway near the front with glass engraved "Dog and Partridge Hotel". The rear corner facing the churchyard repeats the stone detailing found on the front. Behind the main block is an older brick wing, and a later rear extension that is not considered part of the building's historic interest.

== See also ==
- Listed buildings in Wigan
- Listed pubs in Greater Manchester
