= Christ Church, Ince-in-Makerfield =

Coordinates: 53.5386°N 2.6115°W

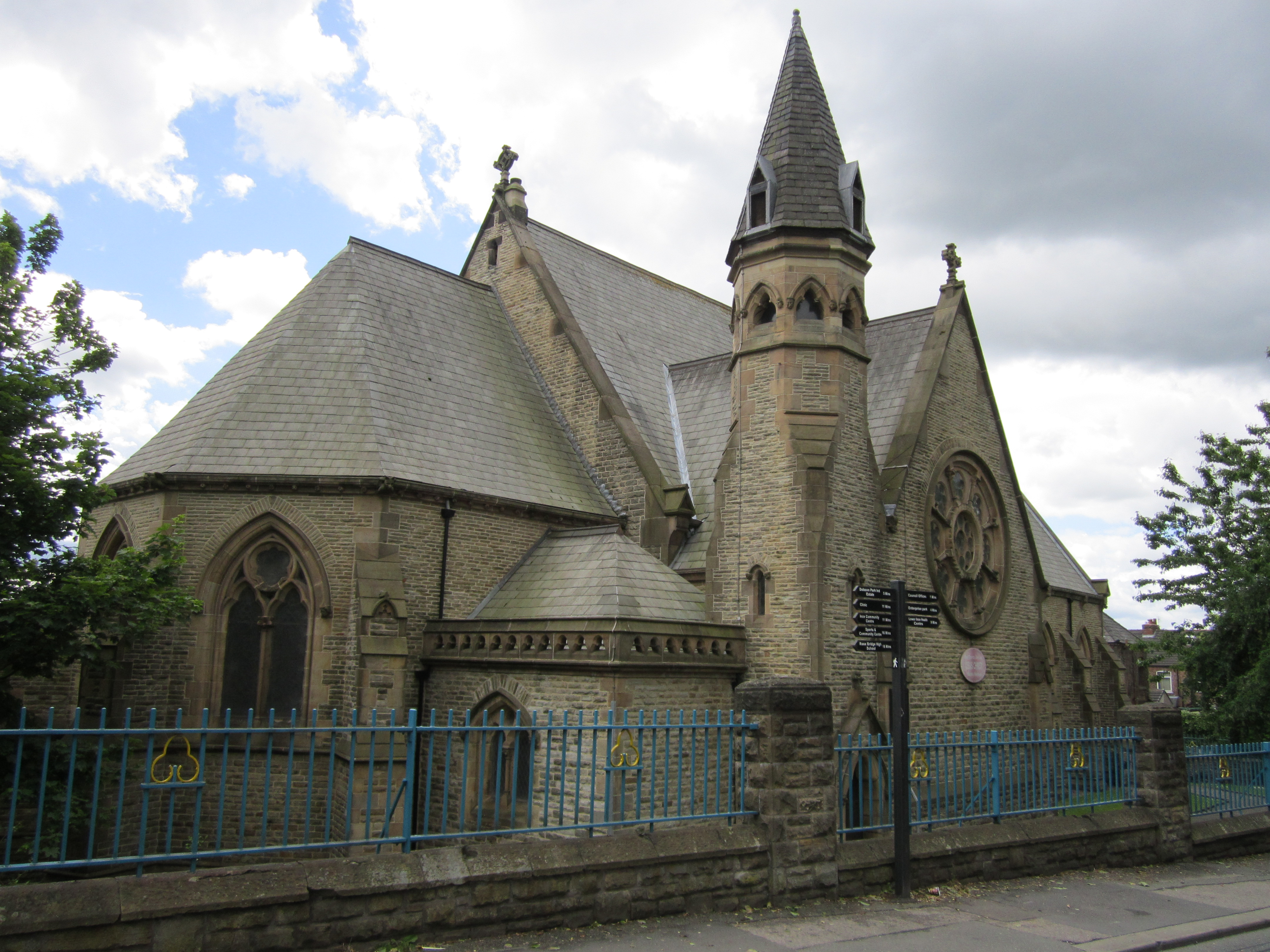
- Christ Church, Ince-in-Makerfield, from the northeast

- Location in Greater Manchester
- OS grid reference: SD 596 048
- Location: Ince Green Lane, Lower Ince, Ince-in-Makerfield, Greater Manchester
- Country: England
- Denomination: Anglican
- Website: Christ Church, Ince-in-Makerfield

History
- Status: Parish church

Architecture
- Functional status: Active
- Heritage designation: Grade II
- Designated: 8 August 1966
- Architect: E. G. Paley
- Architectural type: Church
- Style: Gothic Revival
- Groundbreaking: 1861
- Completed: 1864

Specifications
- Materials: Rock-faced stone, slate roofs

Administration
- Province: York
- Diocese: Liverpool
- Archdeaconry: Warrington
- Deanery: Wigan

Clergy
- Vicar: Revd Dot Gosling

Christ Church is in Ince Green Lane, Lower Ince, Ince-in-Makerfield, Greater Manchester, England. It is an active Anglican parish church in the deanery of Wigan, the archdeaconry of Warrington, and the diocese of Liverpool. Its benefice is combined with that of St Catharine, Wigan. The church is recorded in the National Heritage List for England as a designated Grade II listed building.

== History ==
The church was built between 1861 and 1864 to a design by the Lancaster architect E. G. Paley. When originally planned in 1860 it had been intended to seat 700 people. This was amended the following year to a church seating 677 at an estimated cost of £5,000 (equivalent to £510,000 in 2025).

== Architecture ==
Christ Church is constructed in rock-faced stone with ashlar dressings, and has a slate roof. Its plan consists of a five-bay nave, north and south transepts, a chancel ending in a polygonal apse, north and south vestries, and a porch at the west end. To the east of the north transept is a turret. In the nave there are two-light windows containing plate tracery. Above the porch at the west end is a four-light window with Geometric tracery, and a small single-light window above it. The transepts contain wheel windows with plate tracery. The windows in the chancel have two lights with Geometrical tracery. The stained glass in the west window, dating from 1893, is by F. Holt.

== See also ==
- Listed buildings in Ince-in-Makerfield
- List of ecclesiastical works by E. G. Paley
- List of churches in Greater Manchester
