= John Bull Chophouse =

Listed pub in Wigan, Greater Manchester, England

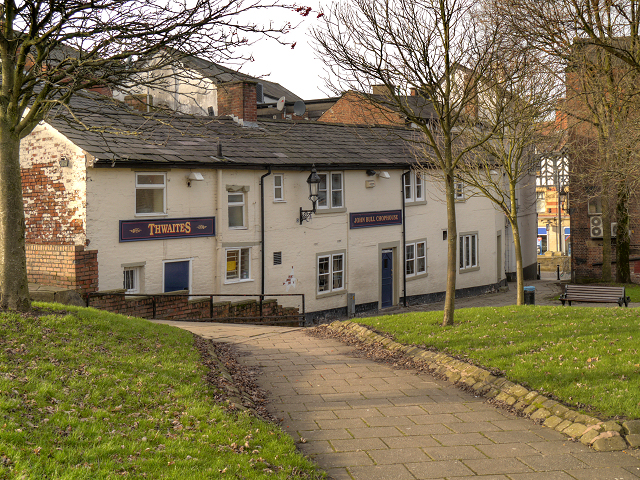
- The pub in 2013

- Location within Greater Manchester
- Alternative names: John Bull Chop House

General information
- Status: Temporarily closed (as of November 2026)
- Type: Public house
- Architectural style: Vernacular
- Location: 2 Coopers Row, Wigan, Greater Manchester, England
- Coordinates: 53.5461°N 2.6311°W
- Year built: 17th or early 18th century (probable)
- Renovated: 2018
- Owner: Thwaites

Design and construction
- Designations

Listed Building – Grade II
- Official name: John Bull Chophouse
- Designated: 29 January 1998
- Reference no.: 1384460

Website
- johnbullchophousewigan.co.uk

The John Bull Chophouse is a Grade II listed public house on Coopers Row in Wigan, Greater Manchester, England. Thought to date from the 17th or early 18th century, it was possibly formed from two cottages and a stable and is also recorded as having served as a slaughterhouse at an unknown date. Ordnance Survey maps of 1894 and 1942 show the now‑combined building as three separate domestic properties, indicating it was not then in use as a pub. The site was included in the Wigan Town Centre conservation area in 1980, and as of March 2026, the freehold was owned by Thwaites Brewery. In August 2026, the pub was badly damaged by fire, and Thwaites stated that it would be restored to its pre‑fire condition.

== History ==
The building was probably constructed in the 17th or early 18th century, according to its official listing, and was possibly originally two cottages and a stable. (Note: According to Wigan Council, it was originally three cottages.) It is also recorded as having served as a slaughterhouse, although the date is not known. The 1894 and 1942 Ordnance Survey maps show the now‑combined building as three separate domestic properties, indicating it was not in use as a public house at that time.

In 1980 the site was included within the newly designated Wigan Town Centre conservation area. On 29 January 1998, the John Bull Chophouse was designated a Grade II listed building. In 2018 the upstairs pool room was refurbished and reopened as a craft‑ale bar known as the Hop House. As of March 2026, the freehold was owned by Thwaites Brewery.

On 4 August 2026, the pub was badly damaged by fire. Police later detained a 44‑year‑old man on suspicion of arson, burglary and possession of Class A drugs. Thwaites later stated that they intend to restore the John Bull Chophouse to its pre‑fire condition, with rebuilding work planned to return the pub to its earlier appearance and layout.

== Architecture ==
The building is constructed of painted brick with a slate roof. It has a long, narrow layout, with the former domestic section making up about two‑thirds of the length and the former stable extending to the left. It has two storeys with four original window openings and two later additions at first‑floor level. The ground‑floor openings follow a regular pattern of windows and doorways, with two of the doorways having plain painted surrounds and one reached by two steps; both doors have been altered. The domestic part has flush‑framed multi‑light windows on both floors. The stable section has two small square windows beside its doorway, and above these a two‑light casement window set slightly to the left and a rectangular louvred opening to the right, with a small later window added further right. A rebuilt chimney stands where the two parts meet.

== See also ==
- Listed buildings in Wigan
- Listed pubs in Greater Manchester
