= St John's Church, Wigan =

St John's Church
- St John's Church, Standishgate
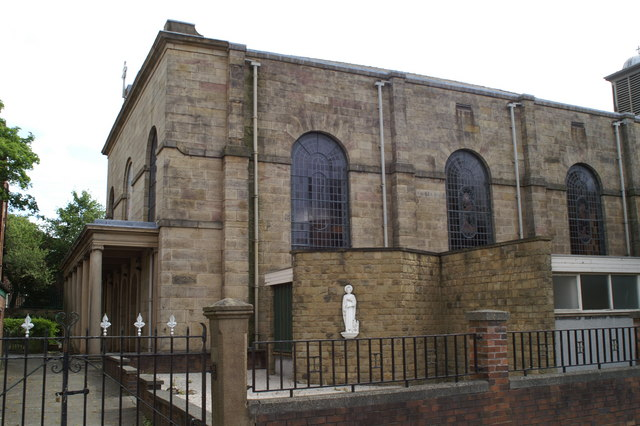
- Front entrance
- St John's Church
- 53.5493°N 2.6280°W
- OS grid reference: SD 58489 06039
- Location: Wigan, Greater Manchester
- Country: England
- Denomination: Roman Catholic
- Website: StWilliamsParishWigan.com

History
- Status: Active
- Founder: Fr Charles Brockholes SJ
- Dedication: St John the Apostle

Architecture
- Functional status: Church building
- Heritage designation: Grade II* listed
- Designated: 24 October 1951
- Architect: Joseph John Scoles (interior)
- Architectural type: Romanesque Revival
- Groundbreaking: 27 January 1818
- Completed: 24 June 1819
- Construction cost: £9,000

Administration
- Archdiocese: Liverpool
- Deanery: Wigan
- Parish: St Mary and St John

St John's Church is a Roman Catholic Church in Standishgate, Wigan, Greater Manchester. It is within 200 feet of another Catholic church, St Mary's. Construction on both churches, was done in a spirit of competition, so they both were finished in the same year, 1819. The competition was because St John's Church was originally served by the Society of Jesus, whereas St Mary's was always served by priests from the diocese. However, the Jesuits gave the church to the Archdiocese of Liverpool in 1933. It is a Grade II* listed building and the sanctuary inside the church was designed by Joseph John Scoles.

== History ==
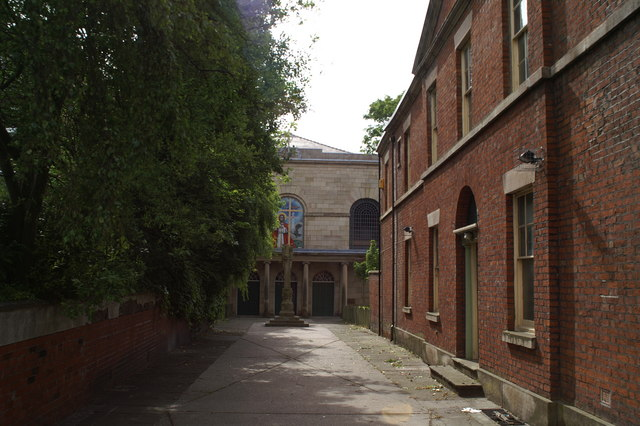
Path leading to church

From 1623, for their own administrative purposes the Jesuits divided the country into 'residences' and St John's church was named after the 'residence' that covered Lancashire, St John's.

Fr Charles Brockholes SJ was the person first connected to the mission of St. John's. He entered the Society of Jesus in 1704 and was sent to Wigan in 1740. When he arrived in Standishgate, where he paid for the building of a house that had a chapel upstairs. This house was built between Dicconson Street and Powell Street. As of 2013, the house still has a priest hiding hole, above a fireplace in the house.

In 1817, the increasing Catholic population of the town meant that there were calls from the congregation for a larger place of worship to be built. A plot of land behind the chapel was used for construction and the foundation stone was laid on 27 January 1818. The church was opened on 24 June 1819. The new church cost £9,000 and could accommodate a congregation of 1,000 people. It was 120 feet long, 50 feet wide and 50 feet high, with room for the parishioners in the organ gallery.

Over the following decades, the church was extended and renovated. In 1849, the interior of St. John's was again decorated at a cost of £400.

In 1933, the Jesuits relinquished the church to the Archdiocese of Liverpool, so both churches were staffed by diocesan priests.

== Parish ==
Like St Mary's church, St John's has two Masses for Sundays, with times that do not conflict with its neighbour, one Mass is 5:00pm Saturday afternoon and the other at 11:00am Sunday morning. Since 2018 St John's has been part of St William's parish.

== See also ==
- Society of Jesus
- Listed buildings in Wigan
