= Royal Oak, Wigan =

Listed pub in Greater Manchester, England

Royal Oak
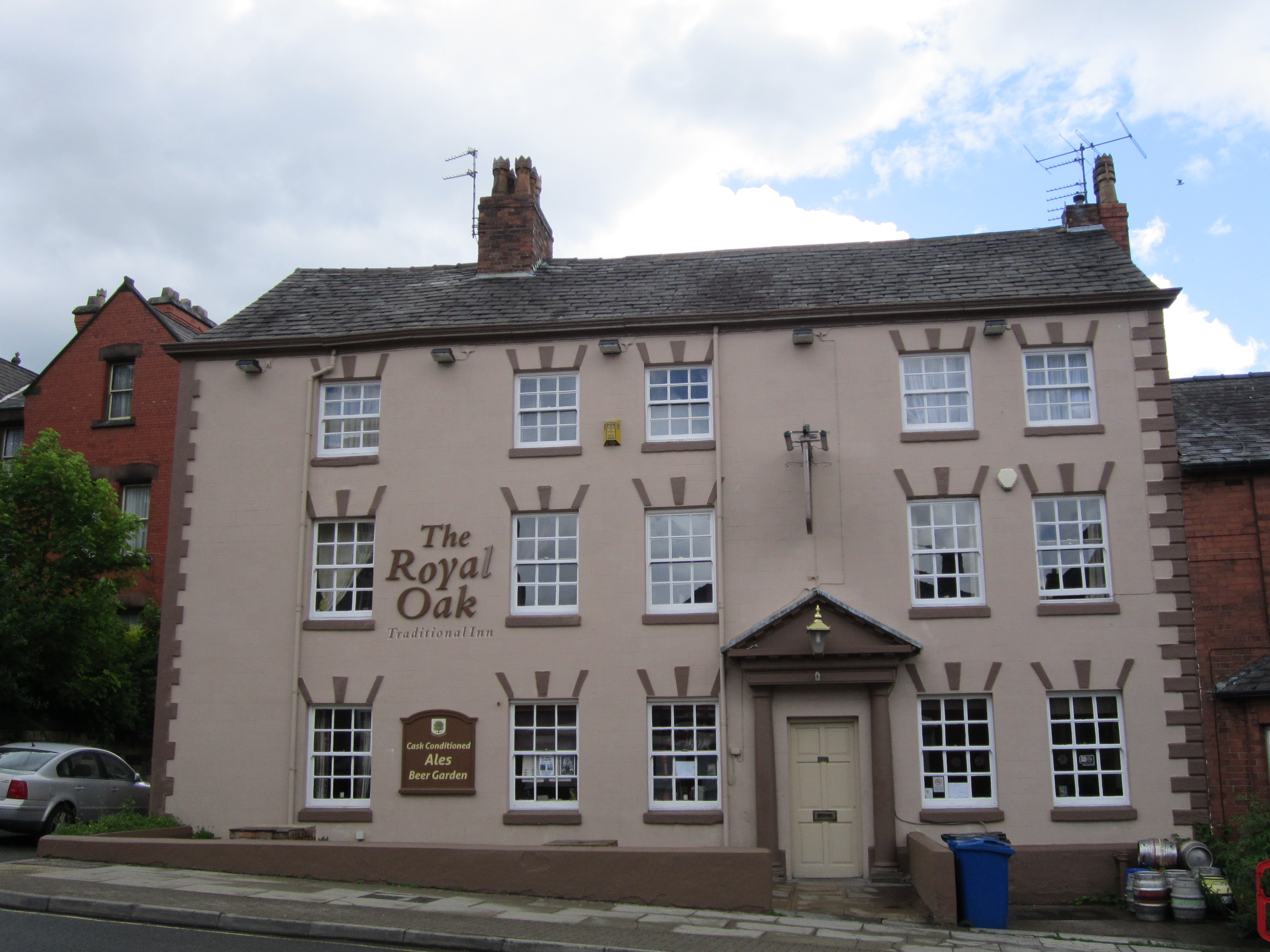
- The pub in 2013

- Location within Greater Manchester
- Alternative names: Royal Oak Hotel

General information
- Type: Public house
- Location: 111–113 Standishgate, Wigan, Greater Manchester, England
- Coordinates: 53.5502°N 2.6283°W
- Year built: Mid to late 18th century
- Owner: Inn The Bar

Design and construction
- Designations

Listed Building – Grade II
- Official name: Royal Oak Hotel
- Designated: 17 November 1997
- Reference no.: 1384518

The Royal Oak (officially listed as the Royal Oak Hotel) is a Grade II listed public house on Standishgate in Wigan, Greater Manchester, England. Thought to date from the mid to late 18th century, it was later extended and altered. As of November 2025, its freehold was owned by Inn The Bar.

== History ==
The building is thought to have been constructed in the mid to late 18th century, according to its official listing, with an early addition on the left and subsequent enlargement and alteration. The 1908 and 1942 Ordnance Survey maps mark the building as a public house, with no attributed name.

On 11 July 1983, the Royal Oak Hotel was designated a Grade II listed building. As of November 2025, the pub's freehold was owned by the Inn The Bar group.

== Architecture ==
The building is likely constructed of brick and has painted stucco walls, with a painted stone base and detailing, a slate roof and brick chimneys. It has a rectangular plan with rooms arranged front and back, along with several later extensions to the rear. The front has three storeys with five windows arranged in a 1–2–2 pattern, broadly symmetrical apart from the left‑hand bay.

The entrance sits between the two pairs of windows and is framed by Tuscan half‑columns supporting a later timber pediment. All the windows are 12‑pane sashes, with shorter ones on the top floor, each set on raised sills and topped with distinctive triple keystones. There is a large chimney along the main roof ridge to the left and another at the right‑hand gable.

== See also ==
- Listed buildings in Wigan
- Listed pubs in Greater Manchester
