= St Mary's Church, Wigan =

St Mary's Church
- St Mary's Church, Standishgate
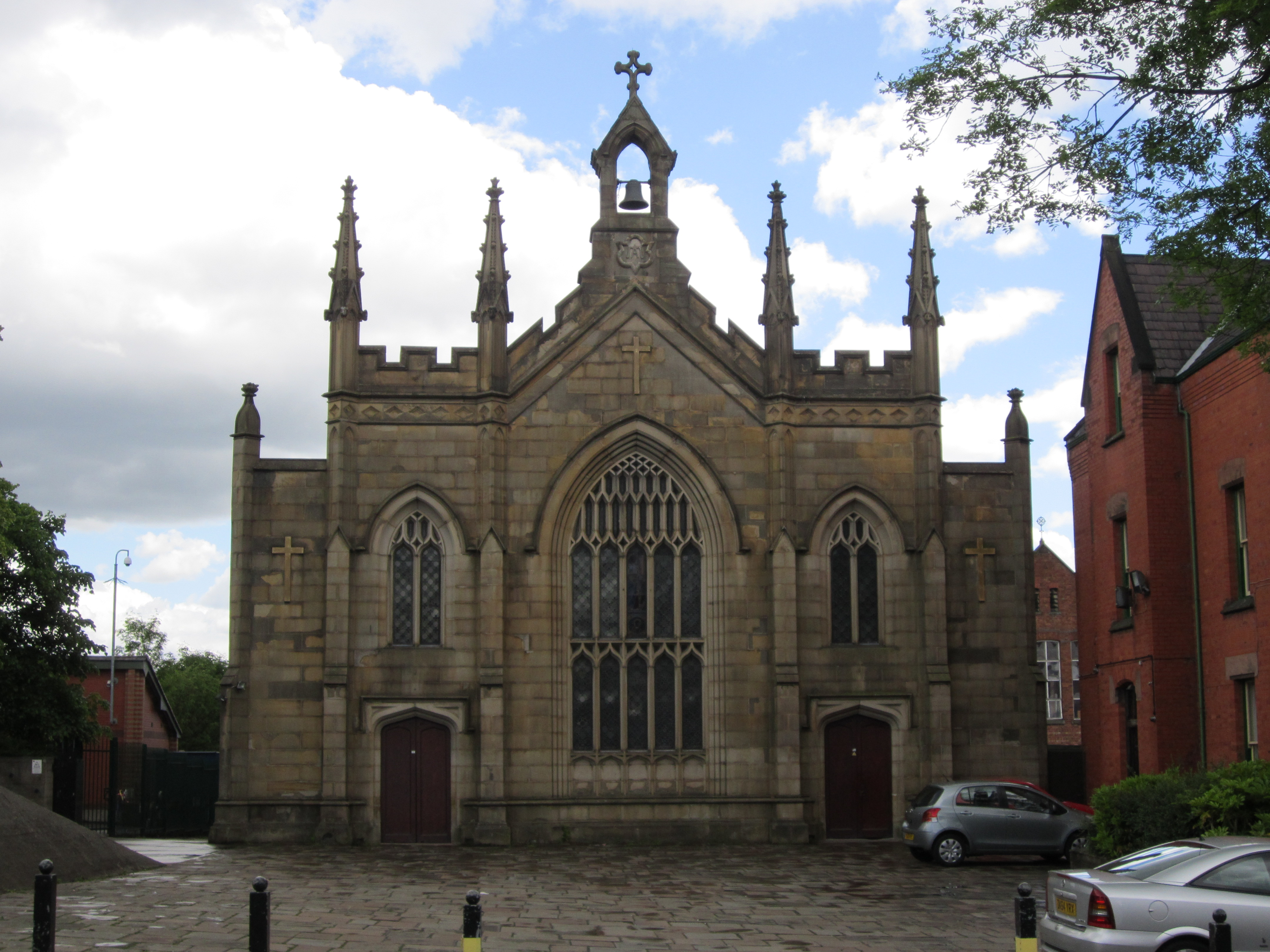
- Church entrance
- St Mary's Church
- 53.5503°N 2.6276°W
- OS grid reference: SD 58513 06150
- Location: Wigan, Greater Manchester
- Country: England
- Denomination: Roman Catholic

History
- Status: Active
- Founder: Fr Charles Middlehurst
- Dedication: St Mary

Architecture
- Functional status: Parish church
- Heritage designation: Grade II*
- Designated: 24 October 1951
- Architectural type: Gothic Revival
- Groundbreaking: 17 March 1818
- Completed: 27 January 1819

Administration
- Archdiocese: Liverpool
- Deanery: Wigan
- Parish: St Mary and St John

St Mary's Church is a Roman Catholic Parish church in the Standishgate area of Wigan, Greater Manchester. It was built in 1818 and is a Grade II* listed building. It is in the Wigan deanery of the Archdiocese of Liverpool. It is within 200 feet of another Catholic church, St John's Church. They were built in a spirit of competition with each other.

== History ==
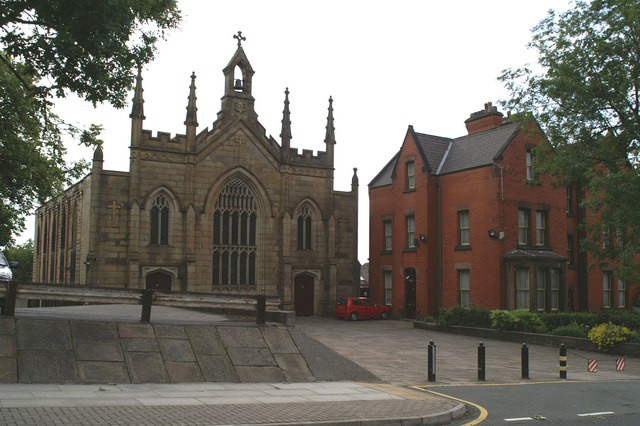
Church with its convent on the right

=== Foundation ===
On 17 March 1818, its foundation stone was laid; less than a year later, on 27 January 1819, the church was opened.

Originally, the church also known as The Hidden Gem, was served by a priest from St Mary's Church, Manchester. It was only with the restoration of the English Catholic hierarchy in 1850 that the church became part of the archdiocese of Liverpool.

=== Extensions ===
With the Catholic population growing, the church was extended and reopened on 19 October 1851. Those present at the ceremony were the Bishop of Liverpool, George Brown and the Bishop of Southwark, Thomas Grant. A new Lady Chapel was opened two weeks later.

In 1859, a Fr Gerard O’Reilly became Rector of the church and, during his time, the organ was rebuilt in 1861, and new pews were installed in 1867.

In 1933, when the Society of Jesus handed over the nearby St John's church to the archdiocese, the two churches began to work in conjunction with each other.

== Parish ==
The church has two Sundays Masses, one at 9:00am and the other at 4:30pm, so that its times do not conflict with St John's church next door. St Mary's Church and St John's Church were united for several years in a single parish. Following a reorganisation of the Wigan pastoral area in 2017 St Mary's again became a one-church parish, with St John's forming a new parish which also included St Patrick's Church.

== See also ==
- Listed buildings in Wigan
