= Whitesmiths Arms =

Listed pub in Wigan, Greater Manchester, England

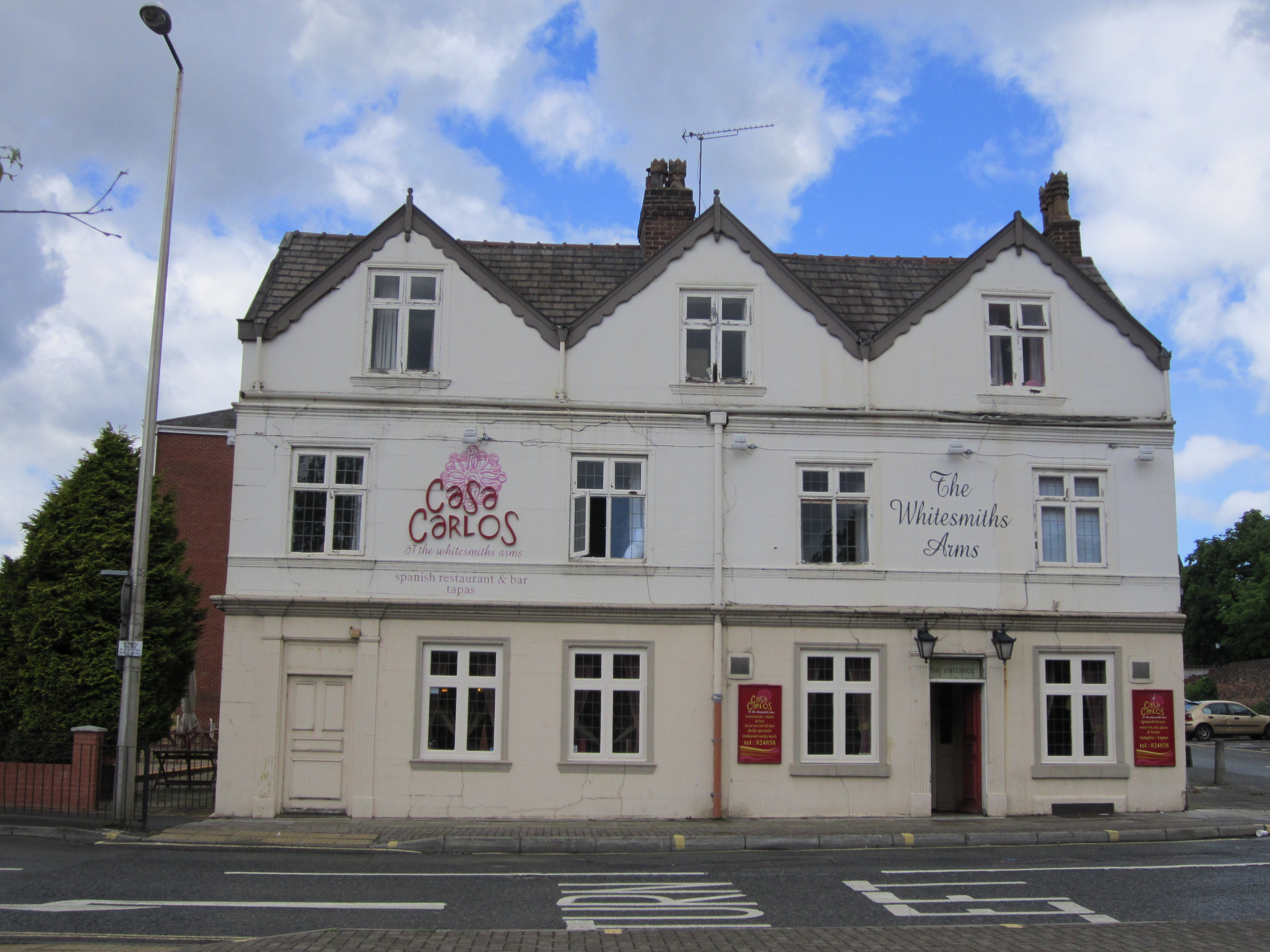
- The pub in 2013

- Location within Greater Manchester
- Former names: Casa Carlos
- Alternative names: The Whitesmiths

General information
- Type: Public house; originally a house (probable)
- Location: 88 Standishgate, Wigan, Greater Manchester, England
- Coordinates: 53.5495°N 2.6293°W
- Year built: Late 17th century (probable)
- Renovated: 2024 (refurbished)

Design and construction
- Designations

Listed Building – Grade II
- Official name: Whitesmiths Arms public house
- Designated: 11 July 1983
- Reference no.: 1384515

The Whitesmiths Arms is a Grade II listed public house on Standishgate in Wigan, Greater Manchester, England. Believed to date from the late 17th century, it is the oldest surviving burgage‑plot building in Wigan and among the oldest properties in the town centre. It has long been recorded as a pub, appearing unnamed on early 20th‑century Ordnance Survey maps, and was included in the Dicconson conservation area in 1982 before being listed the following year. After a period operating as a tapas restaurant, the building underwent refurbishment and returned to pub use in 2024.

== History ==
The building was probably constructed in the late 17th century as a house, according to its official listing, and was later enlarged and altered before eventually being converted into a public house. (Note: According to Wigan Council, it dates from 1600–1650.) It is the oldest surviving burgage‑plot building in Wigan, and among the oldest properties in the town centre. The 1908 and 1942 Ordnance Survey maps mark the building as a public house with no attributed name.

In 1982 the site was included within the newly established Dicconson conservation area, within which the Whitesmiths Arms is the oldest surviving building. On 11 July 1983, it was added to the National Heritage List for England as a Grade II listed structure.

For several years the building traded as a Spanish tapas restaurant called Casa Carlos, before the business moved to new premises on Hallgate in 2019. In September and October 2022, a planning application and accompanying listed building consent was submitted to Wigan Council to convert the first and second‑floor flats in the building into five self‑contained studio units while keeping the ground‑floor restaurant. Approval was granted in January 2023. A further listed building application was made in February 2024 for internal refurbishment and updates to the dining and bar areas, together with improvements to the outdoor spaces and lighting. This was approved in June 2024. Following these works, the premises returned to pub use and reopened as the Whitesmiths Arms later that month.

== Architecture ==
=== Exterior ===
The building is constructed of handmade brick, with the front and left side covered in scored render. It has a slate roof and brick chimney stacks, and is now a double‑depth structure with extensions at the rear.

It has two and a half storeys, with four windows on the first floor and three attic gables. Shallow horizontal bands run above the ground and first floors; the lower one now supports a full‑width 20th‑century fascia. On the ground floor, the left side has a doorway and two cross‑shaped windows, while the right side has a doorway between two matching windows. All of these have 20th‑century leaded glass. The first floor has three similar windows, and the attic gables contain four‑pane sash windows. All windows have shaped sills and surrounds. There is a chimney along the ridge and another on the right‑hand gable.

The right side wall has a small blocked window with a curved top near the front corner, and three two‑light casement windows: one high up near the front, one at first‑floor level towards the back with a brick head above it, and another in the rear extension.

=== Interior ===
Inside, there is a dog-leg staircase dating from around 1700 that rises from the ground floor to the attic. It has a closed side, square posts, turned balusters and a wide shaped handrail. A small lobby at its base is formed by an early wattle and daub partition. The bar is in an Art Nouveau style with mosaic detailing and was originally installed in Glasgow.

In the attic, an upper‑cruck roof truss stands about 2 metres (6 ft 7 in) from the west gable, with small supporting pieces that carry the lower of two original sets of purlins. On the ground floor, some beams are boxed in and may hide earlier structural timbers.

== See also ==
- Listed buildings in Wigan
- Listed pubs in Greater Manchester
