= St Jude's Church, Wigan =

St Jude's Church
- St Jude's Church, Worsley Mesnes
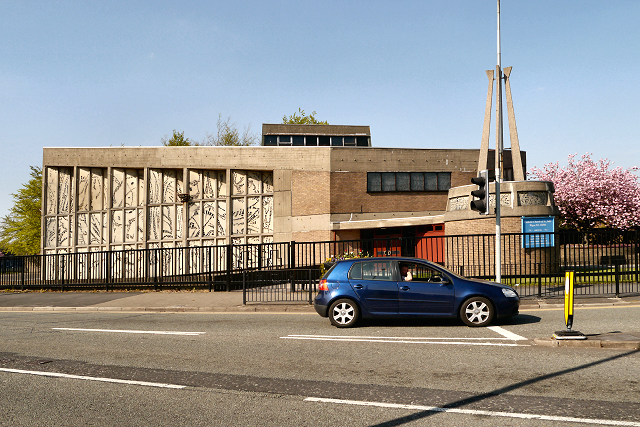
- St Jude's Church
- 53.52629°N 2.64746°W
- OS grid reference: SD 57173 03479
- Location: Wigan
- Country: England
- Denomination: Roman Catholic
- Website: St Jude & St Aidan Parish

History
- Status: Active
- Founded: December 1964
- Founder: Fr Richard Tobin
- Dedication: Jude the Apostle

Architecture
- Functional status: Parish church
- Heritage designation: Grade II
- Architect: L A G Prichard
- Style: Brutalist
- Completed: July 1965
- Construction cost: £100,000+

Administration
- Archdiocese: Liverpool
- Deanery: Wigan
- Parish: St Jude and St Aidan

Clergy
- Priest(s): Fr Michael Harwood; Canon Patrick McNally (retired)

St Jude's Church is a Roman Catholic Parish church in the Worsley Mesnes area of Wigan, Greater Manchester. It was completed in 1965 and is a Grade II listed building in the Brutalist style which stands on the junction of St Paul's Avenue and Poolstock Lane. It is in the Wigan pastoral area of the Archdiocese of Liverpool.

== History ==
=== Foundation ===
Following the demolition of many working class homes in central Wigan in the early-to-mid 20th century there was a migration to new council estates on the outskirts of the town including new developments in the Poolstock and Worsley Mesnes localities. In order to cater to the Catholic inhabitants of the new estates Father Richard Tobin of St Joseph's parish in Wigan, established a chapel of ease (described as a "wooden hut") on St Paul's Avenue, Worsley Mesnes in 1959.

In 1962 Tobin wrote to the Archbishop of Liverpool George Andrew Beck with his proposals for a new, permanent church, suggesting that the church should be dedicated either to St Jude or Our Lady of the Assumption. Beck replied on 15 March:

My dear Father Tobin, Many thanks for your letter. I like your suggestion of St. Jude as a patron of the new church. We already have a parish in honour of The Assumption but none, so far as I know, to St. Jude. I assume that you do not intend to suggest by this title that Wigan is a hopeless case!!

The Liverpool architects L A G Prichard & Sons were engaged and work began in the summer of 1963. Subsidence caused by coal mining in the area necessitated reinforced foundations and the final cost was over £100,000. The foundation stone was laid by Archbishop Beck in December 1964 and the church was opened for worship in July 1965.

=== Description ===
The church was built of reinforced concrete and brick. It is fan-shaped, with the plan of an isosceles triangle with the corners squared off. On front of the entrance porch is a circular baptistry, surmounted by four tapering concrete fins holding a pole with a cross.

The interior features a mosaic of the crucifixion measuring 17 feet by 9 feet designed by Hans Unger and made by Eberhard Schulze. The Stations of the Cross are represented by a series of mosaics with gold backgrounds designed and made by John Madden and Sons of Panton Street, Belfast, N. Ireland, under contract from Earley and Company of Dublin. The design, assembly and finishing of the pieces was completed by Brendan Madden and his brothers. Perhaps the most remarkable feature of the church is the dalle de verre stained glass on the walls of the nave, designed by Robin Riley, made by Verriers de St Jobain in France and fitted by glaziers J O’Neill and Sons. The abstract, swirling patterns are mainly in blue, red, yellow and green.

== Parish ==
St Jude's absorbed the parish of St Joseph's Wigan, when the latter closed in 1995. The parish of St Jude's was united with the neighbouring parish of St Aidan's, Winstanley in 2017. The parish has two Sunday masses: 9:00 am at St Aidan's and 10:30 am at St Jude's. Associated institutions include St Jude's Catholic Primary School, St Aidan's Catholic Primary School and Wigan St Judes Rugby League club.

=== Parish priests ===
- Fr Richard Tobin 1964–1976
- Fr Michael Cronin 1977–1984
- Fr Thomas Delaney 1984–1989
- Canon Patrick McNally 1989–2017
- Fr John Causey 2017–

== See also ==
- Listed buildings in Wigan
