= Listed buildings in Ince-in-Makerfield =

Ince-in-Makerfield is a town in the Metropolitan Borough of Wigan, Greater Manchester, England. The town and the surrounding area contains eight listed buildings that are recorded in the National Heritage List for England. All the listed buildings are designated at Grade II, the lowest of the three grades, which is applied to "buildings of national importance and special interest".

During the 19th century it was an industrial area, with coal mining, iron smelting, engineering works and chemical factories, but none of the listed buildings are directly connected with these industries. The Leeds and Liverpool Canal runs through the area, and associated with this locks and a bridge are listed. The other listed buildings are houses, buildings in a cemetery, and a church.

== Buildings ==
Name and location	Photograph	Date	Notes
Peel Hall and Peel Hall Cottage; 53.54681°N 2.60823°W	—	14th or 15th century (probable)	Originally one house, later divided into two dwellings, it is basically cruck-framed, with external walls in brick, and a roof in slate and stone-slate. There are two storeys and four bays, the outer bays projecting with gables. At the rear is a projecting gabled bay and a later gabled projection. The windows are 20th-century casements, and the doorway has an architrave, a frieze and a cornice. Inside, cruck trusses are visible, and there is a wattle and daub walling.
Westwood Hall and cottage 53.53661°N 2.62607°W	—	17th century	The hall was altered and extended in the late 18th to early 19th century. It is in stuccoed brick with slate roofs, and has an L-shaped plan. There is a main range with two storeys and three bays, a single-storey extension to the left, a wing with three storeys and one bay, and a two-storey rear block. The doorway has a semicircular head and a fanlight, and the windows are mixed, with sashes on the front and casements and sashes elsewhere. Inside there is a cruck truss.
Britannia Bridge and flight of seven locks 53.54269°N 2.61460°W		1816	The bridge and locks are on the Leeds and Liverpool Canal. The bridge carries Warrington Road (A573 road) over the canal. It consists of a single elliptical arch with a keystone and an inscribed panel, and has later iron extensions. The locks are numbers 14 to 20 on the Wigan flight of locks. They are in stone and have gates in timber or iron.
Lock southeast of Poolstock Lane; 53.53328°N 2.63663°W		c. 1816	The lock on the Leeds and Liverpool Canal is in stone and has timber gates. There are a footbridge, ground paddles, and an overflow channel.
Chapel 60 metres southwest of Lodge, Ince Cemetery; 53.53226°N 2.61732°W		1855–57	The Anglican chapel, designed by Alfred Waterhouse in Early English style, is in stone with a slate roof, and consists of a nave, a short chancel and a porch. The windows have trefoil heads, and on the gable is a bellcote.
Chapel 117 metres southwest of Lodge, Ince Cemetery; 53.53176°N 2.61760°W		1855–57	The Roman Catholic chapel, designed by Alfred Waterhouse in Norman style, is in stone with a slate roof, and consists of a nave and a chancel with an apse. The windows are round-headed with zigzag moulding. The south entrance is gabled with a corbeled arch and a cross finial. At the west end is a doorway and a rose window with dog-tooth moulding.
Lodge and gate, Ince Cemetery; 53.53296°N 2.61690°W		1855–57	The lodge was designed by Alfred Waterhouse. It is in stone, and has a slate roof with coped gables, two storeys, and an L-shaped plan. The doorway has a segmental head and a fanlight, the windows are mullioned, some with pointed or cusped heads, and there is a gabled dormer. In the gable facing the drive is a clock face in a square surround. At the entrance to the drive are two gate piers with buttresses, foliated capitals, sunk trefoils, and a four-gabled cap.
Christ Church; 53.53857°N 2.61167°W		1863–64	The church, designed by E. G. Paley, is in stone with slate roofs. It consists of a nave, an open west porch, north and south transepts, and a chancel with north and south vestries. The porch has round columns with crocketed capitals, moulded lintels, a cornice and a gablet decorated with ball-flower and a roundel containing the head of Christ, and a hipped roof. At the northeast is a turret with an octagonal top, a cornice, and a slate-hung spire with lucarnes.
