= St Catharine's Church, Scholes =

Coordinates: 53.5463°N 2.6169°W

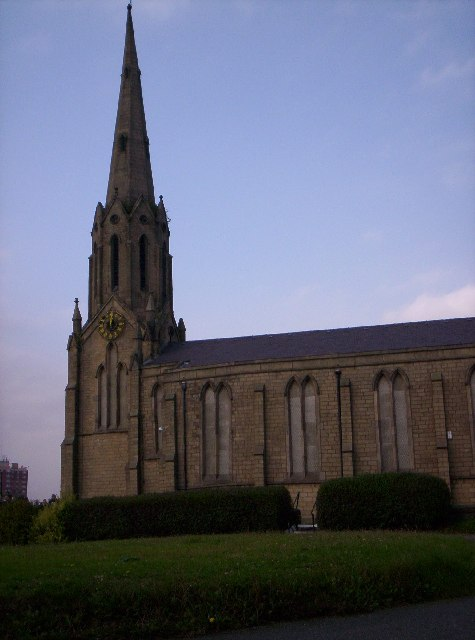

- Location in Greater Manchester
- OS grid reference: SD 59224 05689
- Location: Lorne Street, Scholes, Wigan, Greater Manchester
- Country: England
- Denomination: Anglican
- Website: www.achurchnearyou.com/wigan-st-catharine/

History
- Status: Parish church
- Consecrated: 6 June 1841

Architecture
- Functional status: Active
- Heritage designation: Grade II
- Architect: Edmund Sharpe
- Architectural type: Church
- Style: Gothic Revival
- Groundbreaking: 1839
- Completed: 1841
- Construction cost: £3,180

Specifications
- Materials: Sandstone, slate roofs

Administration
- Province: York
- Diocese: Liverpool
- Archdeaconry: Warrington
- Deanery: Wigan
- Parish: Wigan, St Catharine

Clergy
- Vicar: Revd Samantha Nicholson

St Catharine's Church is in Lorne Street, Scholes, Wigan, Greater Manchester, England. It is an active Anglican parish church in the deanery of Wigan, the archdeaconry of Warrington and the diocese of Liverpool. Its benefice is united with that of Christ Church, Ince-in-Makerfield. The church is recorded in the National Heritage List for England as a designated Grade II listed building. It was a Commissioners' church, having received a grant towards its construction from the Church Building Commission.

== History ==
The church was built in 1839–41 and designed by the Lancaster architect Edmund Sharpe. It was a Commissioners' church costing £3,180 (equivalent to £290,000 in 2025). A grant of £962 was given towards its cost by the Church Building Commission. The land for the church was given by John Woodcock of Springfield Hall; it was originally a chapel of ease. The church was consecrated on 6 June 1841 by Rt Revd John Bird Sumner, Bishop of Chester. In about 1860 the name "Catherine" was changed to "Catharine" and this spelling has continued to be used until the present. About the same time it was discovered that the church was built on a geological fault and that, as a result of coal mining in the area, the west end of the church had moved, causing the spire to lean and twist. Repairs were necessary and these were assisted by contributions from local collieries. In 1864 the church acquired full status as a parish church.

== Architecture ==
St Catharine's is constructed in sandstone from Billinge and has slate roofs; it is in Early English style. Its plan consists of a six-bay nave with north and south aisles constituting one chamber, a south vestry and a short chancel. At the west end is a steeple linked to the nave by a narthex with stair-turrets in the angles. The tower is square and in two stages, with corner buttresses and pinnacles, and a gable at the top of each face. On top of this is an octagonal belfry, again with a gable on each face; this is in turn surmounted by an octagonal spire, with two tiers of lucarnes. In the lower stage of the tower is a west door and in the upper stage are stepped triple-lancet windows with a clock face above them in the gables. The east window is also a stepped triple-lancet. Inside the church are galleries on three sides supported by cast iron columns, with the organ in the west gallery, and box pews. The west end of the church has been partitioned off by a glazed screen.

== Assessment ==
The church was listed at Grade II on 11 July 1983. The architectural historians Richard Pollard and Nikolaus Pevsner are of the opinion that "the steeple is altogether and quite awkwardly too big for the church". Brandwood et al. state that St Catharine's interior, with its original plan, box pews and galleries, "is the most intact of Sharpe's churches".

== External features ==
The sandstone boundary wall of the churchyard is listed at Grade II, as is the brick-built vicarage that stands to the south of the church.

== Reconstruction ==
In 2012 St Catharine's was granted funding from the Heritage Lottery Fund to straighten the spire, which would have collapsed had it been neglected. Work began the same year on dismantling, reinforcing and reconstructing the spire.

== See also ==
- List of architectural works by Edmund Sharpe
- List of Commissioners' churches in Northeast and Northwest England
- List of churches in Greater Manchester
- Listed buildings in Wigan
