= Wigan War Memorial =

War memorial in Greater Manchester, England

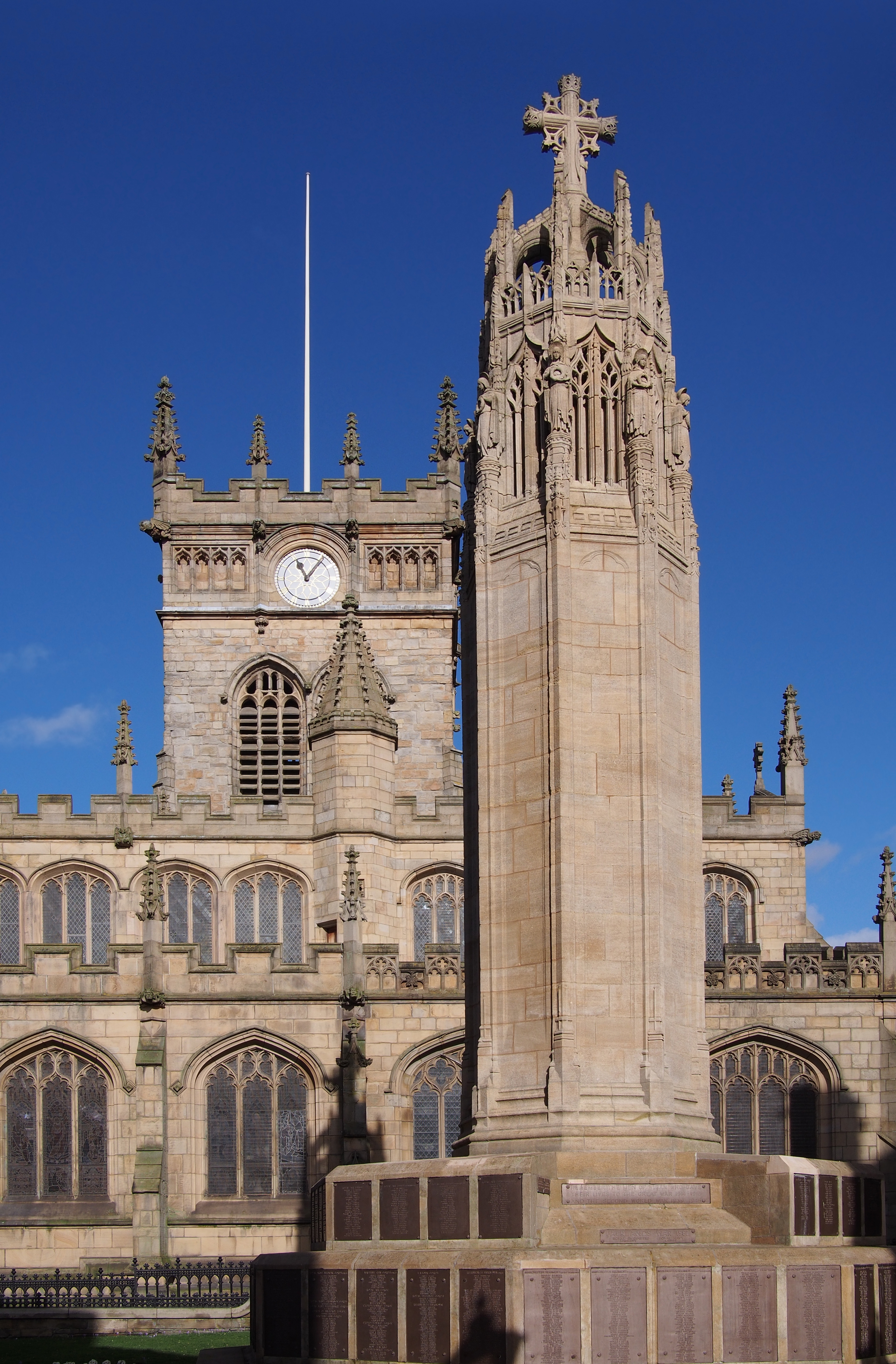
- The war memorial in 2014, with All Saints' Church behind

- Location within Greater Manchester

General information
- Location: Wallgate, Wigan, Greater Manchester, England
- Coordinates: 53.5457°N 2.6325°W
- Year built: 1925; 101 years ago

Technical details
- Material: Portland stone

Design and construction
- Architect: Sir Giles Gilbert Scott

Listed Building – Grade II*
- Official name: War memorial south of Church of All Saints with encircling railings
- Designated: 24 October 1951
- Reference no.: 1384562

Wigan War Memorial is a Grade II* listed monument in the churchyard of All Saints' Church on Wallgate in Wigan, Greater Manchester, England. Designed by Sir Giles Gilbert Scott and constructed in 1925, it commemorates the men of Wigan who lost their lives during the First World War and later conflicts, including the Second World War.

== History ==
Plans for a permanent war memorial in Wigan began shortly after the First World War. Initial proposals in 1920–21 suggested an obelisk or cross in Mesnes Park, but the site was later rejected in favour of an alternative location. In 1923 the War Memorial Committee launched a public appeal to raise funds, initially proposing a site on Wallgate. By 1924 architect Sir Giles Gilbert Scott, known for works such as Liverpool Cathedral and the red telephone box, was commissioned to design the memorial, which was subsequently relocated to the churchyard of All Saints' Church. The project was funded by public subscription.

Construction began in May 1925, which required the relocation and reinterment of existing graves within the site. The memorial was unveiled on 17 October 1925 by General Sir Herbert Alexander Lawrence and was dedicated by the bishop of Liverpool, Albert David. It originally incorporated stone tablets listing the names of approximately 1,800 men from Wigan who died during the First World War.

By 1929, deterioration of the stone tablets had been reported, and plans were made to replace them with bronze panels, which were installed in 1935.

On 24 October 1951, Wigan War Memorial was designated a Grade II* listed structure for its architectural and historic significance.

The bronze plaques were stolen in 2006 but were replaced in 2007 through council funding.

== Location ==
The war memorial stands in the churchyard of All Saints' Church on Wallgate in the town centre of Wigan. Positioned near the main entrance to the church, it occupies a raised, landscaped setting enclosed by quatrefoiled iron railings and includes lamp standards on octagonal plinths at the entrances. The memorial is used as the site for civic remembrance ceremonies, including annual Remembrance Sunday services.

== Design and architecture ==
The war memorial is constructed primarily from Portland stone, with bronze plaques listing the names of the fallen. Its design is based on the Eleanor cross style, a medieval form associated with royal memorials, which Scott adapted for this civic monument. The structure stands approximately 44 feet (13 m) in height on a spreading octagonal, three-stage plinth measuring 22 feet (6.7 m) across at its widest. The lower stage incorporates seating, while the upper stages feature 40 Hopton Wood Stone panels bearing the names of the men commemorated.

The central shaft rises from the plinth and is flanked by buttresses terminating in crocketted pinnacles. Above these are eight sculpted angels holding wreaths, symbolising victory and remembrance. The upper section features an elaborately traceried lantern crowned by a cross.

Two principal inscriptions are featured on the memorial. On the south face, the dedication reads:

"REMEMBER THE MEN OF WIGAN WHO GAVE
THEIR LIVES TO THE GREAT WAR 1914–1918
AND THE SECOND WORLD WAR 1939–1945."

Beneath this, an additional plaque commemorates the Falklands War in 1982, listing the relevant units and names of the fallen.

Within the south recess, two undated plaques record the names and units of two men killed in Afghanistan, alongside a further plaque dedicated to a naval officer killed in service.

The north face bears a biblical quotation:

"A GOOD LIFE HATH BUT A FEW DAYS
BUT A GOOD NAME LIVETH FOR EVER."

Inside the north recess, two undated plaques display the names and units of men omitted from the original First World War memorial. The names are arranged by unit. On these plaques, the names of the Manchester Regiment, beginning with the local Territorial Battalion, the 5th, appear before those of the Royal Navy.

== Gallery ==
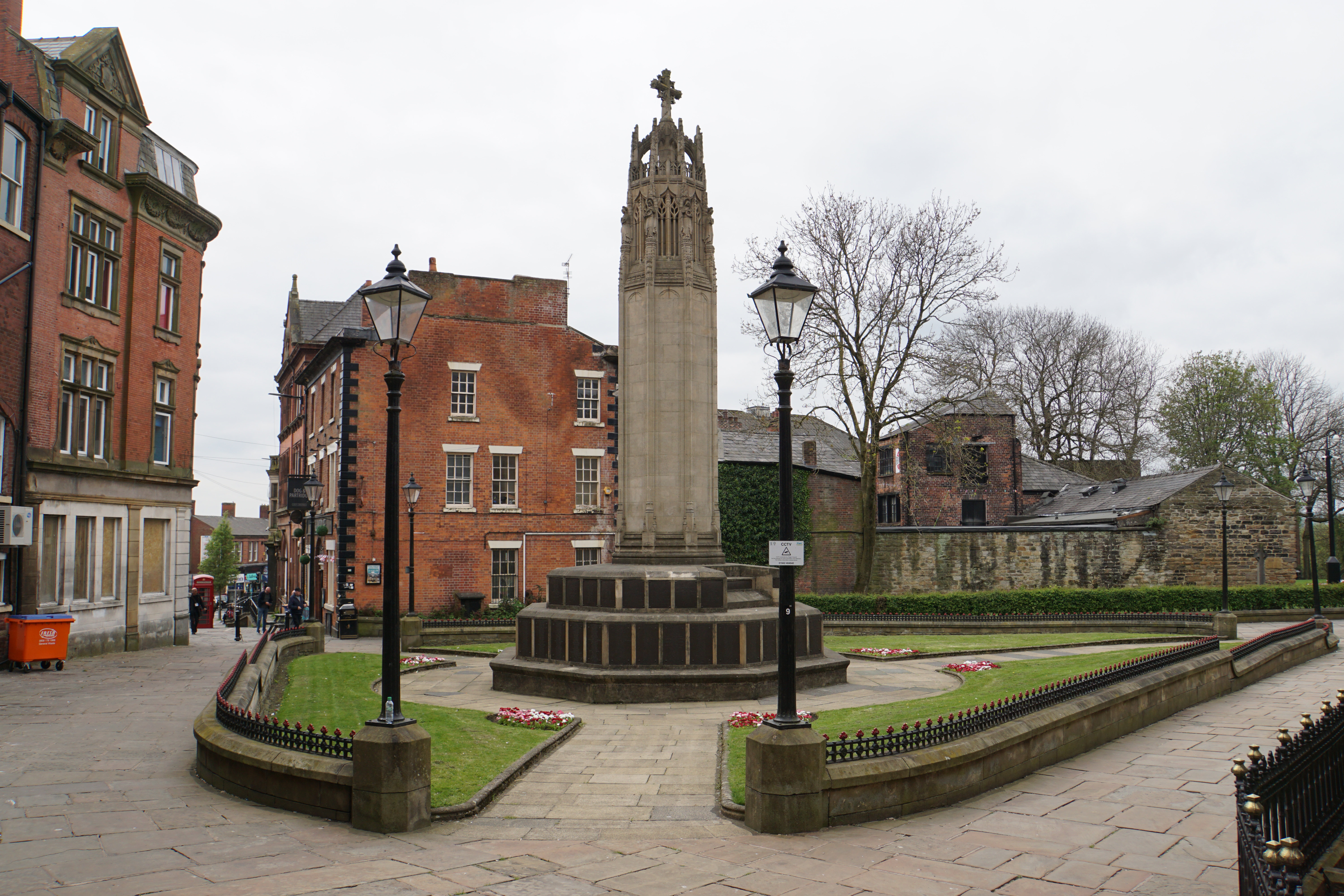
War memorial with its encircling railings

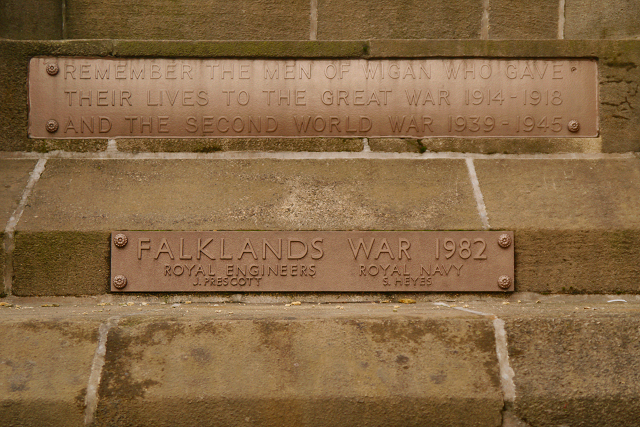
Inscriptions on the south face

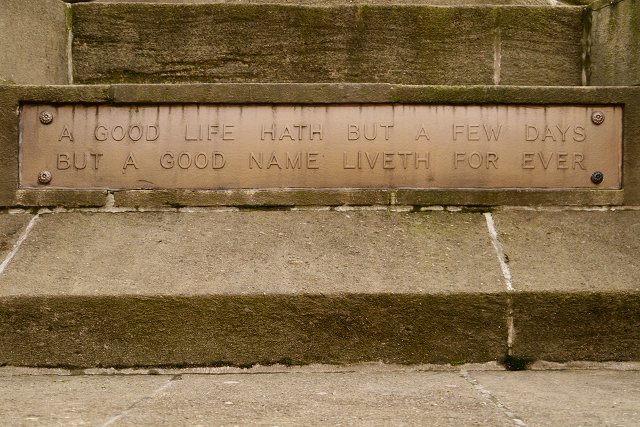
Inscription on the north face

== See also ==
- Grade II* listed buildings in Greater Manchester
- Listed buildings in Wigan
