= Scholes, Greater Manchester =

Coordinates: 53.544707°N 2.625604°W

Scholes
- Location within Greater Manchester
- OS grid reference: SD585055
  - London: 176 miles (284 km) SE
- Metropolitan borough: Wigan
- Metropolitan county: Greater Manchester
- Region: North West
- Country: England
- Sovereign state: United Kingdom
- Post town: WIGAN
- Postcode district: WN1
- Dialling code: 01942
- Police: Greater Manchester
- Fire: Greater Manchester
- Ambulance: North West

Scholes is an urban area in Wigan, Greater Manchester, England. Scholes is immediately to the east of Wigan's town centre; separated from the commercial area by the River Douglas.

Historically a part of Lancashire, Scholes is noted for its council estate and series of tower blocks, which are prominent features in this area of the town.

North West England has several places called Scholes. Some, like Scholes in Wigan, are simply areas within towns, however, some are actual villages in their own right which are totally stand-alone.

Scholes was once a ward of Wigan, east of the town centre. As described in the Victoria Histories of the Counties of England, Lancashire (VCH Lancs, Vol. 4), the district formerly had four wards: St George and St Patrick, the innermost divided by a street called Scholes, and Lindsay and St Catherine's outside. It is now contained in the Wigan Central ward.

The Church of St Catherine was consecrated in 1841 and has a small graveyard attached. In October 1864 representatives of James Horrocks of Spennymoor, claiming to be the heir of Robert Ford who died in 1772, took possession of the ‘Manor House' in Scholes and were besieged for some days, to the excitement of the town.
