= Magee Marshall & Co =

Former brewery in Lancashire, England (1853–1970)

Magee Marshall & Company
- Type: Brewery
- Founded: 1853
- Founder: David Magee
- Defunct: 1970
- Headquarters: Derby Street, Bolton, Lancashire, England,

Magee Marshall & Company was a brewery that operated from the Crown Brewery in Bolton, then part of Lancashire, England. It was founded in 1853 by David Magee, a brewer and spirit merchant. He moved from the Good Samaritan Brewhouse to the Crown Hotel in the 1860s and built the Crown Brewery on Derby Street next to the hotel. After his death, the business passed to his sons, who acquired David Marshall's Grapes Brewery and the Horseshoe Brewery. The company was registered as Magee Marshall & Company Ltd. in 1888. It later acquired Henry Robinson's Brewery in Wigan and Halliwell's Alexandra Brewery. In 1959 the firm was taken over by Greenall Whitley & Company and closed in 1970.

The brewery was built in 1893 (Brewers Journal, 1893, p.564) by William Bradford in a "traditional brewery style", with a five-storey section designed for gravity-based processing and an ornamental tower. Until the 1950s the company brought in water with a high calcium carbonate content from Burton-on-Trent, transporting it by rail in tankers for use in brewing.
