= Bay Mare =

Pub in Bolton, Greater Manchester, England

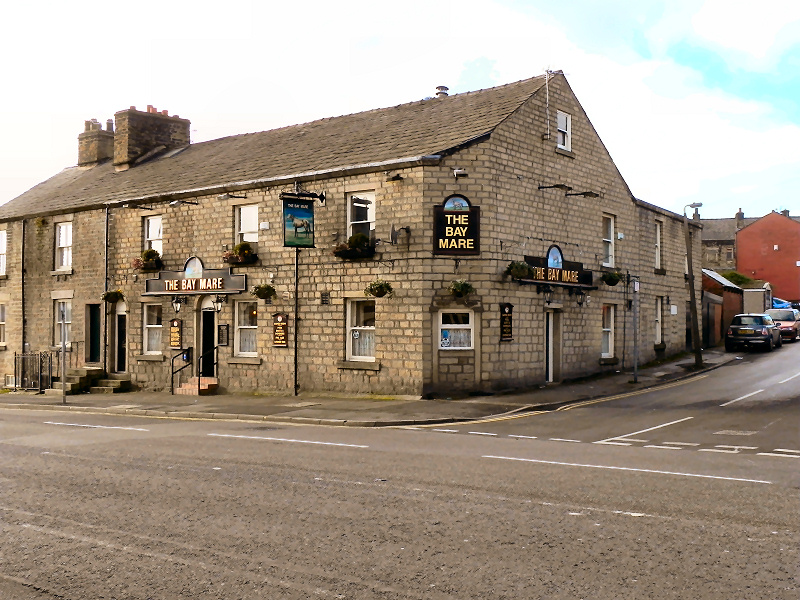
- The pub in 2010

- Location within Greater Manchester

General information
- Type: Public house
- Location: Blackburn Road, Astley Bridge, Bolton, Greater Manchester, England
- Coordinates: 53.6033°N 2.4326°W
- Year built: c. 1830; 196 years ago

Design and construction
- Designations

Listed Building – Grade II
- Official name: Numbers 645 and 647 and the Bay Mare public house
- Designated: 26 April 1974
- Reference no.: 1387920

The Bay Mare is a Grade II listed public house on Blackburn Road in Astley Bridge, an area of Bolton, Greater Manchester, England. Built around 1830, it occupies part of a listed terrace, arranged along Blackburn Road and Pemberton Street.

== History ==
The terrace was built around 1830 as a row of six houses, including two back‑to‑back homes in the return facing Pemberton Street. No public house is shown at the address on or before the 1930 Ordnance Survey map, which records only the terrace. By the time of the 1939 edition, however, the mapping identifies a public house on the site.

On 26 April 1974, the Bay Mare was designated a Grade II listed building, included within the listing of the whole terrace as a single structure. By 1982 the pub was operating as a Matthew Brown establishment. As of 2026, the Bay Mare is owned by Admiral Taverns.

== Architecture ==
The terrace is constructed in stone and topped with slate. The front has two storeys with five window openings. Two entrances to what were originally Nos. 645 and 647 Blackburn Road sit in the middle of the frontage, each reached by a short flight of steps; one has a simple surround and the other has an arched one. Windows sit to either side on both floors.

Further along is the main doorway to the public house, also framed by an arch, with two windows on each floor to its right. The window at the far left belongs to the side wall of the house reached from Pemberton Street.

On the right-hand gable, another doorway is set above steps leading over a cellar, which is lit by small openings at ground level. Throughout the building, two‑pane windows have been fitted back into the original openings.

The left side of the gable contains Nos. 29 and 31 Pemberton Street, which have a similar entrance and replacement windows set where the originals were. No. 29 also includes a small single‑storey addition with a hipped slate roof and its own doorway.

== See also ==
- Listed buildings in Bolton
- Listed pubs in Greater Manchester
