= Yates Wine Lodge =

Yates Wine Lodge may refer to:

- Yates's, a pub chain in the United Kingdom, founded as Yates's Wine Lodge
- Yates Wine Lodge, Bolton, a listed former pub in Greater Manchester, England
