= Swan Lane Mills =

Former cotton mill complex in Greater Manchester, England

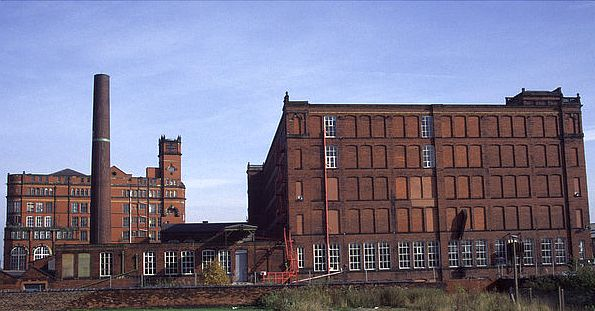
- Swan Lane Mills: No. 3 on left, Nos. 1 and 2 on right

- Location within Greater Manchester

General information
- Location: Higher Swan Lane, Bolton, Greater Manchester, England
- Coordinates: 53.5643°N 2.4423°W
- Year built: 1903, 1906, 1914

Technical details
- Material: Brick

Design and construction
- Architecture firm: Stott and Sons
- Designations

Listed Building – Grade II*
- Official name: Swan Lane Mills numbers 1 and 2
- Designated: 26 April 1974
- Reference no.: 1388070

Listed Building – Grade II*
- Official name: Swan Lane Mill number 3
- Designated: 26 April 1974
- Reference no.: 1388071

Swan Lane Mills is a former cotton mill complex on Higher Swan Lane in Bolton, Greater Manchester, England. Historically in Lancashire, the mills were designed by Stott and Sons of Oldham and built in 1903, 1906, and 1914. When completed, the double mill (Nos. 1 and 2) was the largest spinning mill in the world. All three mills are Grade II* listed buildings. As of 2025, Nos. 1 and 2 accommodate a variety of commercial occupants, whereas No. 3 Mill is included on Historic England's Heritage at Risk Register.

== History ==
Swan Lane Mills are typical of the final phase of cotton mill construction in Lancashire, characterised by their vast scale and flamboyant terracotta decoration, reflecting the industry's prominence and prosperity. The complex was planned as a double mill with a central boiler house and built in two phases. Swan Lane No. 1 Mill was completed in 1903, with No. 2 Mill following three years later. The double mill was designed to contain 210,000 mule spindles. No. 3 Mill, built in 1914, housed a further 120,000 mule spindles. No. 1 Mill spun fine counts using Sea Island Cotton, while No. 2 Mill focused on medium counts using Egyptian cotton. The complex also contained 250 carding machines and 200 drawing and roving frames.

On 26 April 1974, Nos. 1 and 2 Mill was granted Grade II* listed status. No. 3 Mill was separately listed as Grade II* on the same day.

Cotton production at the complex ceased in 2001. Today, Nos. 1 and 2 accommodate a variety of commercial occupants.

=== Heritage at Risk Register ===
As of 2025, No. 3 Mill is included on Historic England's Heritage at Risk Register, reflecting its deteriorating condition and the absence of an agreed scheme for repair or reuse. The building is assessed as being in "poor" and "declining condition", and remains one of the most significant industrial structures in Bolton still awaiting conservation-led redevelopment.

== Architecture ==
The mills are constructed in brick with yellow-brick decoration. Both mills are five storeys over a basement and were built in the same style, with wide segmentally arched windows and flat concrete roofs. They have a yellow-brick eaves band and a stone dentilled cornice. Their projecting stair towers feature Italianate details and balustraded parapets. The double engine house on the north-west side was built to power both mills, with the rope-race tower projecting behind it. The mill chimney has been reduced in height but retains an emblem of a swan in white lettering. Internally, the structure consists of cast iron columns and brick-arched ceilings. No. 1 Mill is 25 bays wide and five bays deep, with a single-storey and basement extension to its north side—possibly a former card room—now used as a warehouse. No. 2 Mill is 23 bays long and six bays deep. The mill's two-storey office block is attached next to the site entrance.

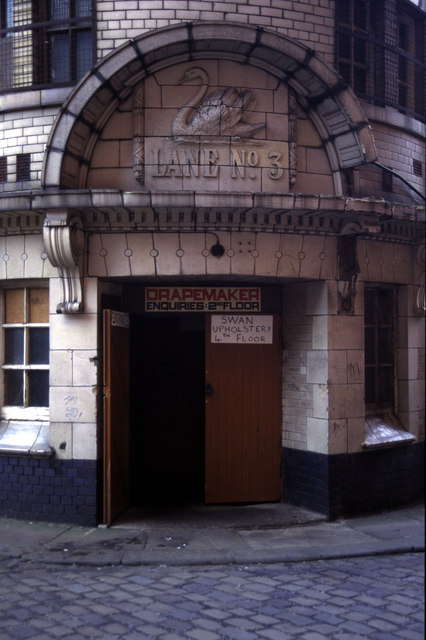
The decorated entrance to No. 3 Mill

No. 3 Mill, built in 1914, is constructed in brick with stone dressings, rounded corners, and a ridged slate roof. It is 23 bays long and 14 bays wide, with segmentally headed windows, and rises to eight storeys in height (six storeys plus a double attic). It is possibly the tallest of the mule-spinning mills, most of which were up to six storeys in height. Above the sixth storey is a cornice from which carved swans project at intervals, and the arcaded attic has round windows to its upper storey. The south-west corner entrance contains a panel with a carved swan above the doorway and leads to a staircase. The tower above is corbelled out from the fifth floor and has angle pinnacles. A two-storey extension houses the card room and warehouse. The engine house, two bays wide and three bays deep, has round-arched windows.

== Power ==
George Saxon & Co supplied No. 1 Mill with a cross-compound engine (works number 352) in 1903. It developed 1,300hp, had 26 and 52-inch cylinders with a 5-foot stroke, and its 26-foot (7.9 m) flywheel powered the machinery via 35 ropes. In 1906 an identical engine was installed for No. 2 Mill. No. 3 Mill was powered by a 2,000 hp vertical triple-expansion engine, also supplied by Saxons. It had a 25-foot (7.6 m) diameter flywheel weighing 25 tons, Corliss valves, and 44 ropes. Steam was generated by ten Lancashire boilers. The engines powered the entire mill complex until 1959, when motor-driven ring frames were installed, although one engine continued to provide power for some processes in Nos. 1 and 2 Mills.

== In popular culture ==
In 1983 Swan Lane Mills was featured in an episode of the documentary Fred, in which Fred Dibnah was hired to remove the decorative ornament on top of the chimney, by then the last decorative-topped chimney in Bolton. He was paid £4,500 (1982) for the work.

== See also ==
- Grade II* listed buildings in Greater Manchester
- List of mills in Bolton
- Listed buildings in Bolton
