= Stork Tavern =

Listed pub in Bolton, Greater Manchester, England

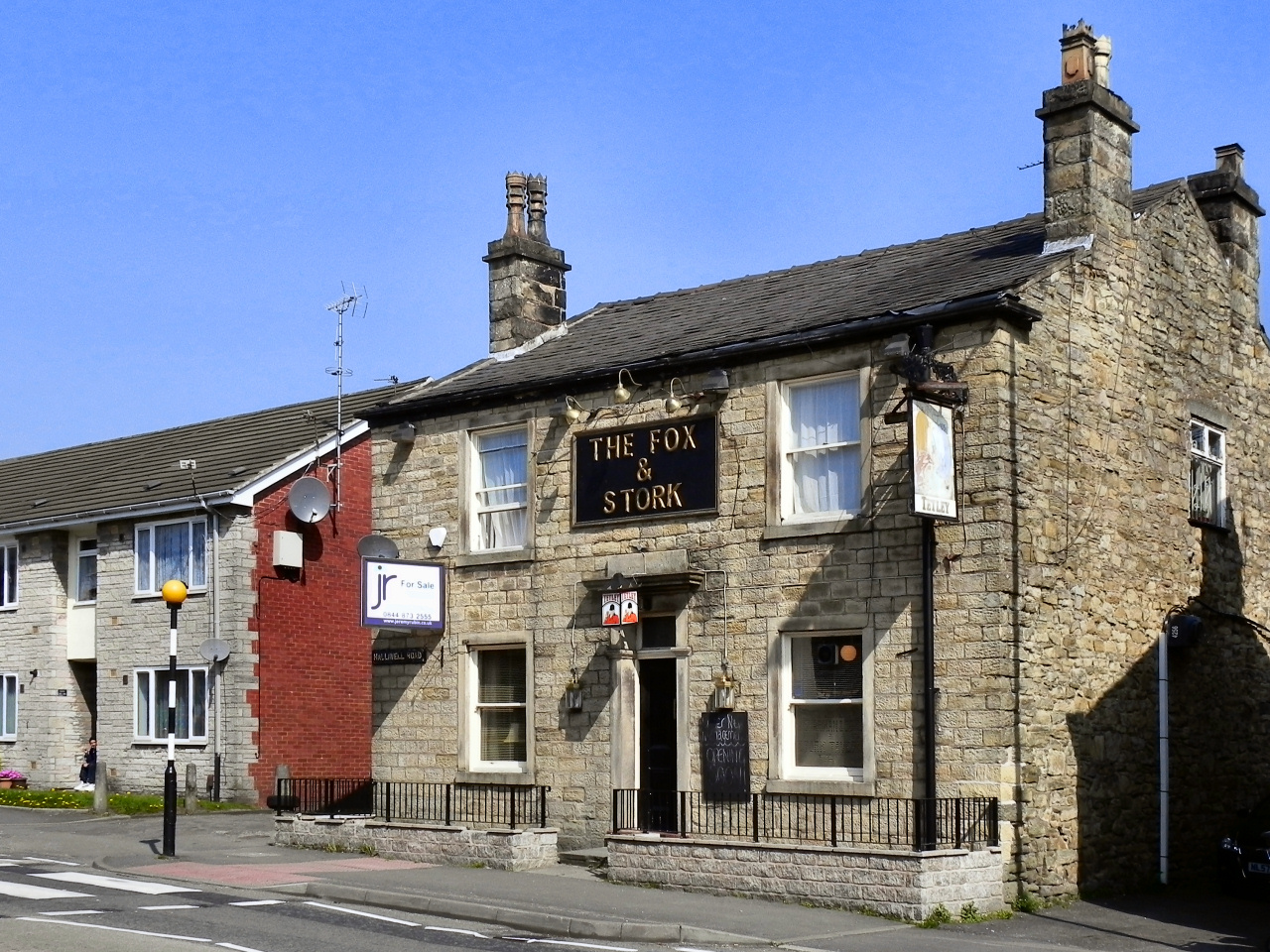
- The pub in 2011, then known as the Fox and Stork

- Location within Greater Manchester
- Former names: Fox and Stork; Stork and Fox

General information
- Type: Public house
- Location: 548 Halliwell Road, Halliwell, Greater Manchester, England
- Coordinates: 53.5959°N 2.4492°W
- Year built: c. 1850; 176 years ago

Design and construction
- Designations

Listed Building – Grade II
- Official name: Stork Tavern
- Designated: 26 April 1974
- Reference no.: 1388055

Website
- storktavern.com

The Stork Tavern is a Grade II listed public house on Halliwell Road in Halliwell, an area of Bolton, Greater Manchester, England. Built around 1850, the site includes a former bowling green to the rear. The pub has a long history of use, with earlier records referring to it as the Stork Tavern from the late 18th century.

== History ==
According to a local report, a public house called the Stork Tavern was established in 1789, although this earlier phase is not documented in the official listing, which dates the present building to around 1850. The name Stork Tavern was still in use in the 1920s.

On the Ordnance Survey maps published in 1893 and 1930, the structure is shown in its corner position with Elliott Street but is neither named nor marked as a pub. A bowling green is first recorded to the rear on the 1943 edition.

On 26 April 1974, the Stork Tavern was designated a Grade II listed building. By 1982 the pub was operating as a Tetley's establishment. The Campaign for Real Ale records later names including the Fox and Stork and the Stork and Fox, though without dates for their use, while the photograph in the article from 2011 shows the pub trading as the Fox and Stork. The former bowling green is now used as a beer garden.

== Architecture ==
The building is made of dressed stone and has a slate roof. It has two floors with two front windows and a doorway in the middle, set within a shaped surround with a small window above it. Each floor has simple sash windows, and there is an additional larger sash window on the left side wall. The eaves are finished with timber detailing, and the chimneys sit on the end walls, slightly forward of the roof ridge.

== See also ==
- Listed buildings in Bolton
- Listed pubs in Greater Manchester
