= Church of St George, Bolton =

Listed building in Greater Manchester, England

Church of St George
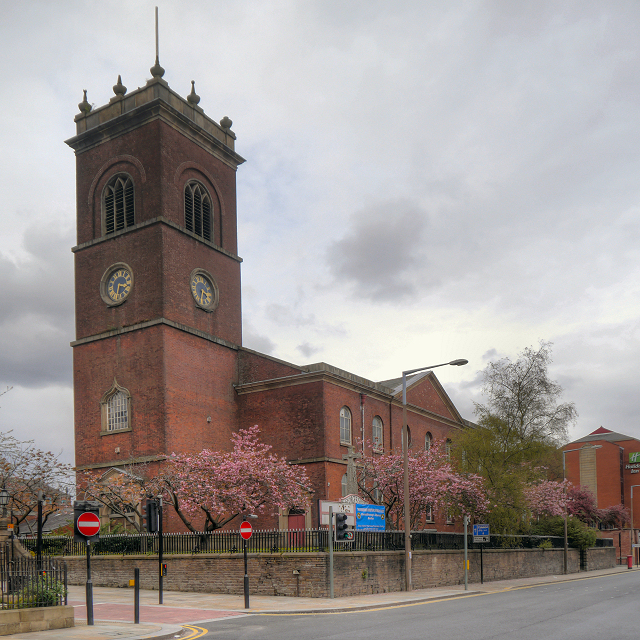
- St George's Church, Bolton

- Location within Greater Manchester

General information
- Architectural style: Georgian
- Location: Bath St, Bolton, Greater Manchester, England
- Coordinates: 53.5815°N 2.4312°W
- Year built: 1796
- Renovated: 1907 (added)

Technical details
- Material: Brick with slate roof and stone dressing

Design and construction
- Architect: Samuel Hope

Listed Building – Grade II*
- Official name: Church of St George
- Designated: 26 April 1974
- Reference no.: 1388252

The Church of St George is a redundant church on Bath Street in Bolton, Greater Manchester, England. It was completed in 1796, with a shallow chancel and south chapel added or rebuilt 1907 by James Simpson. The church was designated a Grade II* listed building on 26 April 1974. It closed in 1975 and was used as a crafts centre until 2007.

In 1806 a set of change-ringing bells was cast by John Rudhall for the church to celebrate Nelson's victory at Trafalgar. In 1976 the bells were removed from the closed church and were destined for a local scrapyard, but were acquired by the Anglican Diocese of Wangaratta. They were shipped to Victoria in 1977 and were first rung in their new home in 1987, after a tower had been built to house them. They are now the oldest "complete" ring of bells in Australia.

In 2010 The Bolton News reported that the Manchester Diocese intended to lease the church to the Redeemed Christian Church of God (RCCG), subject to approval by the Church Commissioners' Closed Churches Division.

== See also ==
- Grade II* listed buildings in Greater Manchester
- List of churches in Greater Manchester
- Listed buildings in Bolton
