= Finishers Arms =

Listed pub in Bolton, Greater Manchester, England

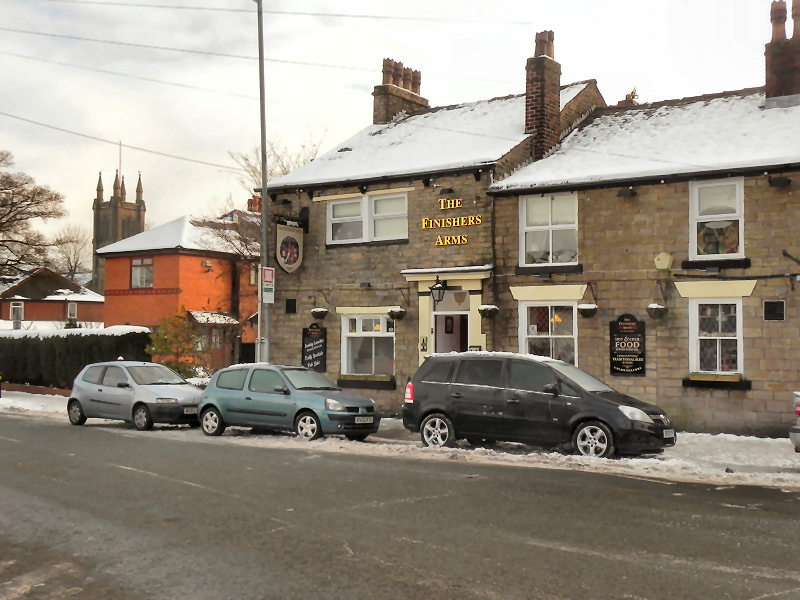
- The pub in 2010

- Location within Greater Manchester
- Alternative names: Finisher's Arms; Finishers' Arms

General information
- Type: Public house
- Location: 487 Church Road, Bolton, Greater Manchester, England
- Coordinates: 53.5916°N 2.4681°W
- Year built: c. 1830; 196 years ago

Design and construction
- Designations

Listed Building – Grade II
- Official name: The Finishers Arms (number 487) and numbers 489–493
- Designated: 26 April 1974
- Reference no.: 1387968

Website
- thefinishersarms.com

The Finishers Arms is a Grade II listed public house on Church Road in Bolton, Greater Manchester, England. Built around 1830, it incorporates an adjoining house from a later phase of development. The building forms part of a group listing with three neighbouring terraced houses and has continued in use as a pub into the 21st century.

== History ==
The building was constructed in about 1830. It appears on the Ordnance Survey map published in 1894 as the Finishers' Arms public house, but neither the presence of a pub nor its name is shown on the subsequent maps issued in 1909, 1929, or 1945.

On 26 April 1974 the Finishers Arms was designated a Grade II listed building, as part of a single listing that also included three adjoining terraced houses (numbers 489–493 Church Road). By 1982 the pub was operating as a Greenall Whitley establishment. Since 2008 the Finishers Arms has been owned and operated independently.

== Architecture ==
The building is constructed of roughly dressed stone laid in regular courses, with a roof covered in stone flags. The pub incorporates an adjoining house that represents a later phase of construction. The frontage has two storeys and four window openings, originally forming two separate small units. The pub entrance is set beside a window with tinted glass, followed by two further windows, the left-hand one having originally been a doorway. Chimneys rise from the end walls.

== See also ==
- Listed buildings in Bolton
- Listed pubs in Greater Manchester
