= Churchills, Bolton =

Listed former pub in Greater Manchester, England

Churchills
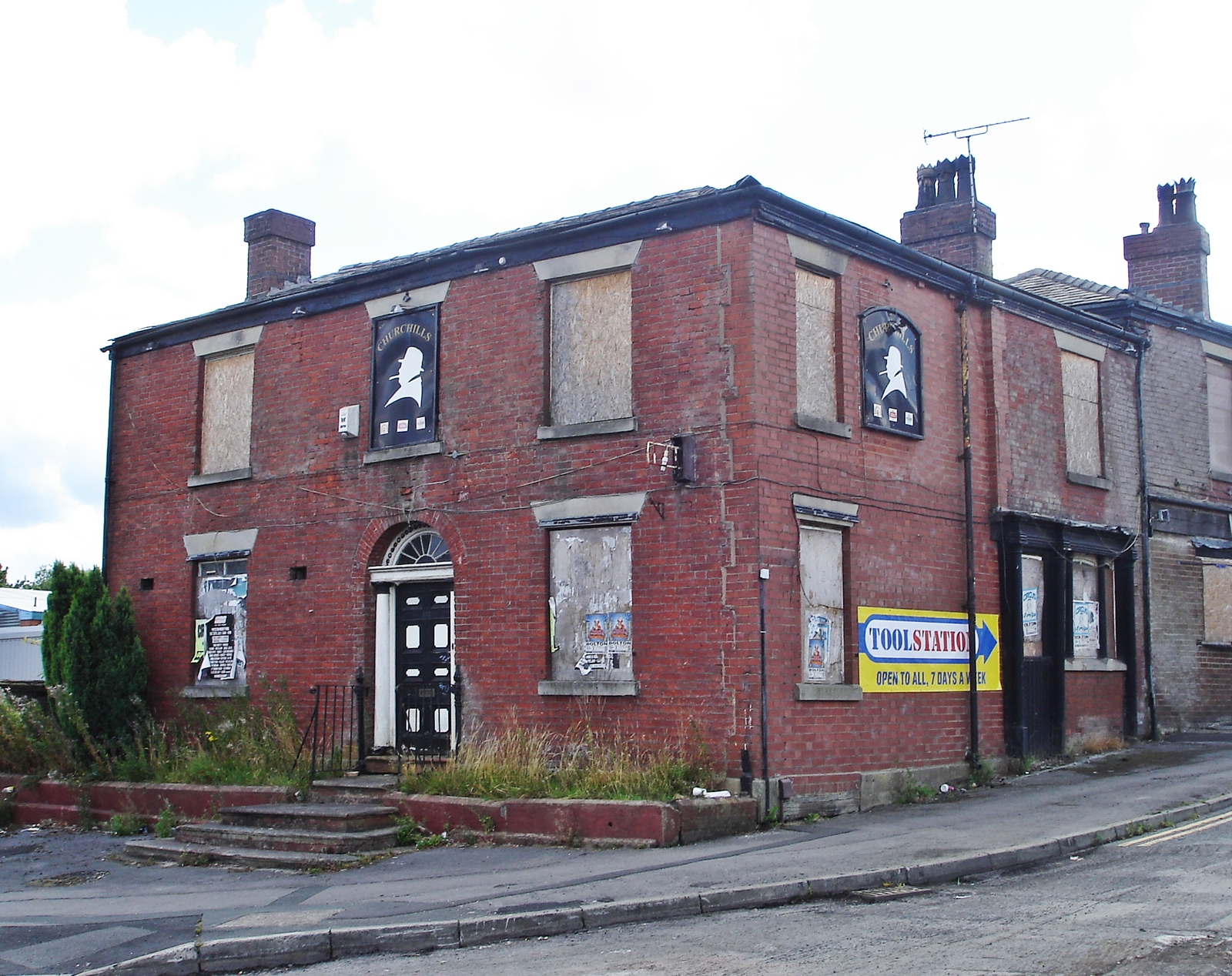
- The building in 2018

- Location within Greater Manchester
- Former names: Rose Hill

General information
- Status: Derelict
- Type: Public house
- Location: Manchester Road, Great Lever, Bolton, Greater Manchester, England
- Coordinates: 53.5706°N 2.4209°W
- Year built: Early 19th century
- Renovated: 1986 (refurbished)
- Closed: 2009

Design and construction
- Designations

Listed Building – Grade II
- Official name: Churchills public house
- Designated: 26 April 1974
- Reference no.: 1388112

Churchills (formerly the Rose Hill) is a Grade II listed former public house on Manchester Road in Great Lever, a suburb of Bolton, Greater Manchester, England. Built in the early 19th century, it closed in 2009 and has since suffered arson damage; the building remains derelict, and as of November 2026 no proposals for its reuse have been recorded.

== History ==
The building originated in the early 19th century as a public house, and may have been constructed for that purpose, according to its official listing. Local reports state that it opened in 1830 as a beerhouse operated by the Lancashire and Yorkshire Railway Company. It appears on the Ordnance Survey maps published in 1893 and 1947 as a public house, although no name is shown.

On 26 April 1974, the building was designated a Grade II listed structure. The pub was later listed in the Good Beer Guide for 1979 and 1980.

By 1980 the premises were operating under the name Rose Hill, and by May 1981 they had become part of the Greenall Whitley estate. In 1984 the property was put up for sale and was subsequently acquired by the amusement‑machine supplier Bandmatic. Following a refurbishment in early 1986, the pub was renamed Churchills.

After closing in 2009, the building experienced repeated deterioration, including arson attacks in 2014 and 2022. As of November 2026 it remained unoccupied and in a derelict state, and no schemes for its repair or future use had been submitted.

== Architecture ==
The building is constructed in brick on a stone base and has a slate roof, which slopes down over the right‑hand end. It has two storeys and three front windows, with the main entrance placed slightly to the right of centre. The upper middle window, now covered by the inn sign, lines up with the doorway. The door has eight panels and a fanlight above it, set within a recessed surround with Tuscan columns. The ground‑floor windows on either side have been replaced but sit in their original openings, each with a flat painted head. The upper windows are simple four‑pane sashes. There are chimneys on the end walls. The side elevation has two windows and includes a 19th‑century bar front with a doorway and window beneath a fascia.

== See also ==
- Listed buildings in Bolton
- Listed pubs in Greater Manchester
