= 26–28 Bradshawgate =

Listed building in Bolton, Greater Manchester, England

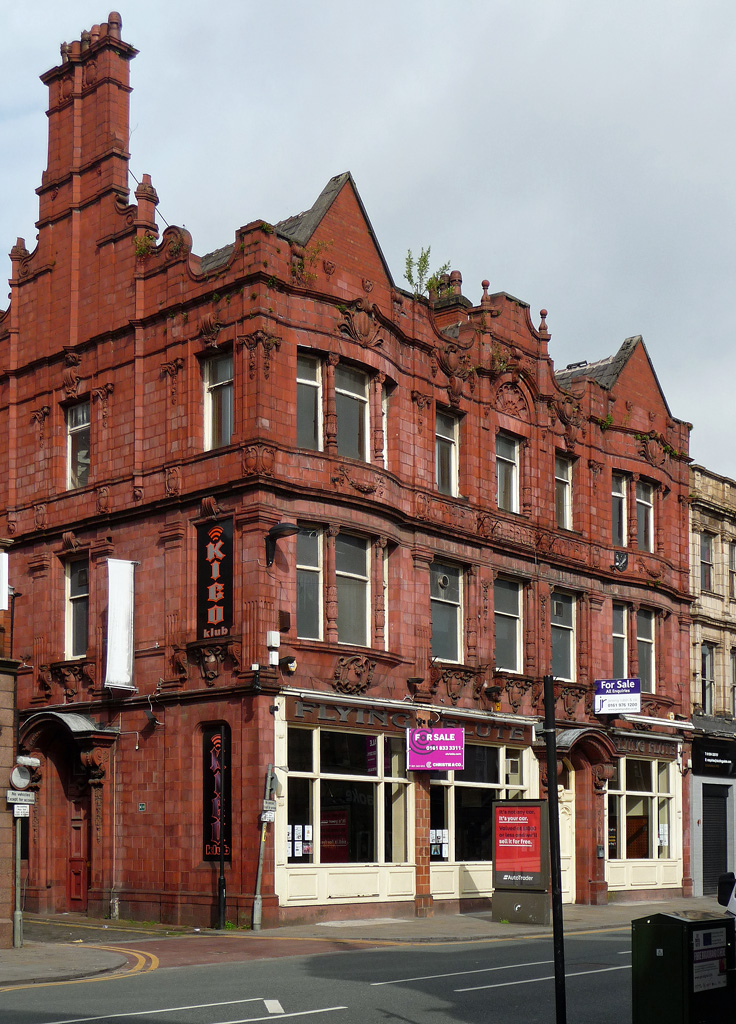
- The building in 2017

- Location within Greater Manchester
- Former names: Fleece Hotel; Gaiety; Maxims; Flying Flute

General information
- Status: Converted to commercial use with flats above
- Type: Hotel, public house (former)
- Location: Bradshawgate, Bolton, Greater Manchester, England
- Coordinates: 53.5791°N 2.4271°W
- Year built: 1907; 119 years ago

Design and construction
- Designations

Listed Building – Grade II
- Official name: Nos. 26–28, Bradshawgate
- Designated: 22 September 1998
- Reference no.: 1387932

26–28 Bradshawgate is a Grade II listed building on Bradshawgate in Bolton, Greater Manchester, England. Built in 1907 and originally operating as the Fleece Hotel, it later traded under several names, including the Gaiety, Maxims, and the Flying Flute public house, before being converted into three commercial premises with flats on the upper floors in the late 2010s.

== History ==
26–28 Bradshawgate was built in 1907 as the Fleece Hotel, a substantial Edwardian building distinguished by its ornate terracotta façade. The Fleece traded for several decades before the premises became a public house and were rebranded under a succession of entertainment‑led names during the later 20th century, including the Gaiety and Maxims.

On 22 September 1998, Nos. 26–28 were designated a Grade II listed building. By the early 21st century the building was operating as the Flying Flute pub. Following its closure in 2017, the interior was remodelled and the ground floor converted to commercial use, with flats created on the upper floors. The building remains in mixed commercial and residential use.

== Architecture ==
The building is faced in terracotta and has a slate roof. It has three storeys and a symmetrical front with five windows, marked by two gabled sections at each end and the main entrance set just to the right of the centre. A small canopy projects above the doorway. The ground‑floor windows have been replaced but appear to follow the original layout.

Both end bays have shallow bow windows on the first and second floors, each containing three lights. These are decorated with a central panel on the first floor and carved swags below the second‑floor windows, with wreath motifs above. The gables above are finished with coping. The three central windows also carry decorative panels, and the middle second‑floor window sits within an arched surround topped by a small gable. Horizontal bands run across the front, adding further detail.

On the side elevation, a second entrance sits beneath another canopy. The windows here have moulded surrounds with decorative panels, brackets and keystones. A chimney stack rises through the centre of the gabled wall.

== See also ==
- Listed buildings in Bolton
- Listed pubs in Greater Manchester
