= King's Head, Bolton =

Listed pub in Greater Manchester, England

King's Head
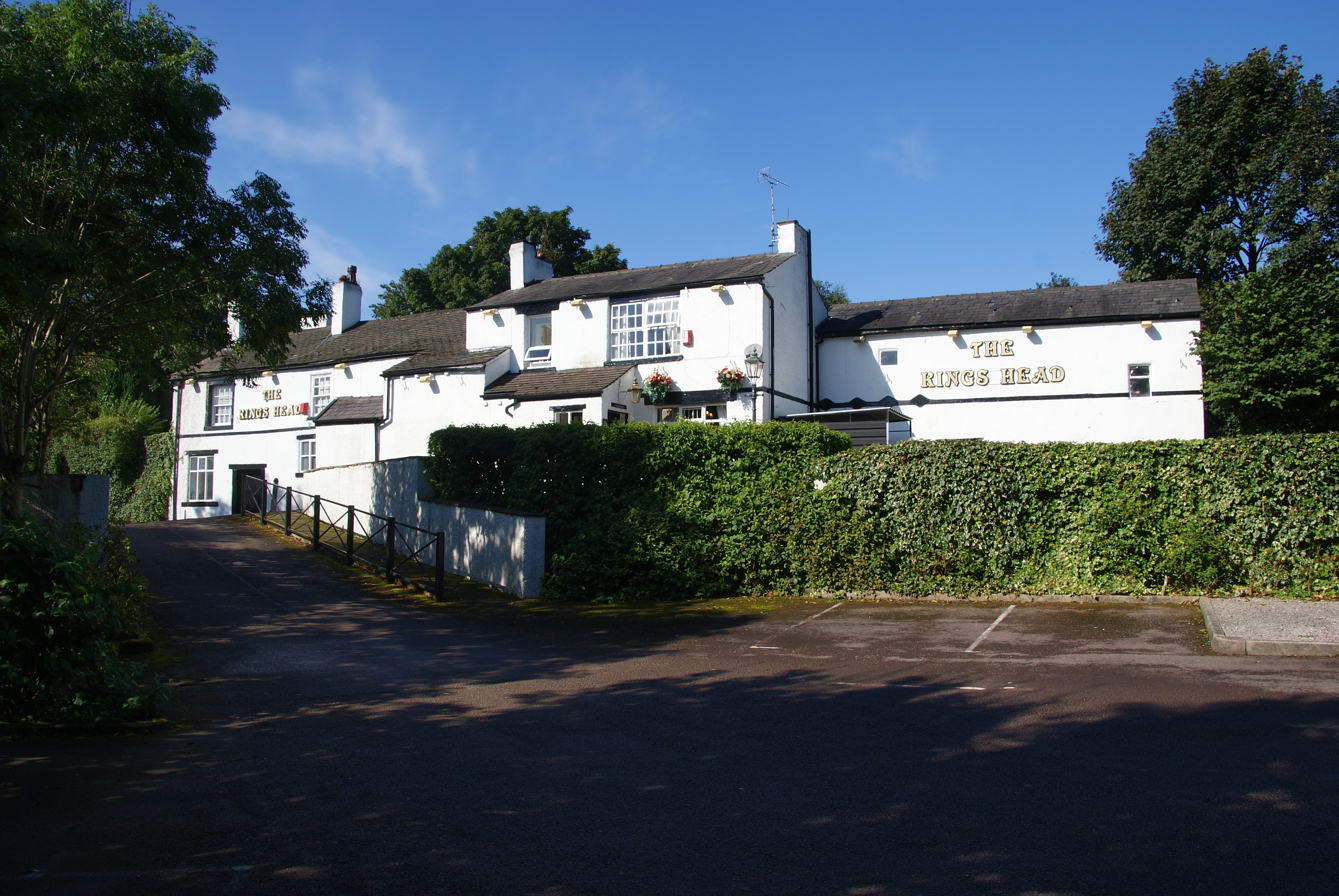
- The pub in 2012

- Location within Greater Manchester
- Former names: King's Head Hotel

General information
- Type: Public house
- Location: 52–54 Junction Road, Deane, Greater Manchester, England
- Coordinates: 53.5682°N 2.4660°W
- Year built: Late 18th century
- Renovated: Mid-19th century (extended)

Design and construction
- Designations

Listed Building – Grade II
- Official name: Kings Head public house
- Designated: 26 April 1974
- Reference no.: 1387968

The King's Head is a Grade II listed public house on Junction Road in Deane, an area of Bolton, Greater Manchester, England. Built in the late 18th century and extended in the mid-19th century, it stands within the Deane village conservation area and has continued to operate as a pub into the 21st century.

== History ==
The building was constructed in the late 18th century and was extended in the mid-19th century, according to its official listing. It appears on the Ordnance Survey map published in 1893 as the King's Head Hotel, and by the 1929 edition the designation public house had been added to its name.

On 26 April 1974, the King's Head was designated a Grade II listed building. By 1982 the pub was operating as a Tetley's establishment.

The King's Head lies within the Deane village conservation area, which also includes Deane Church and its churchyard. In 2025 it was reported to be the only remaining pub in Bolton with a bowling green still used for its original purpose.

== Architecture ==
The building has a roughcast exterior, a mix of slate and tile roofs, and is of two storeys. The original part has three front windows, with the main door set slightly left of centre. The door has a simple stone surround, and there are three‑part windows on either side, though a later single‑storey extension now covers the right‑hand bay. The upper windows are sash types with 12 and 16 panes. There are chimneys on the end walls.

A taller section was later added on the right. It has a lean‑to porch at ground level with a three‑part window beside it, and above are sash windows with four and 12 panes. This section also has end wall chimneys.

== See also ==
- Listed buildings in Bolton
- Listed pubs in Greater Manchester
