= Listed buildings in Bolton =

Bolton is a town in the Metropolitan Borough of Bolton, Greater Manchester, England, and its central area is unparished. The central area of the town contains over 230 listed buildings that are recorded in the National Heritage List for England. Of these, three are listed at Grade I, the highest of the three grades, 13 are at Grade II*, the middle grade, and the others are at Grade II, the lowest grade.

Most of the listed buildings come from the period of the Industrial Revolution and later. Before this, the surviving buildings include two halls, Smithills Hall and Hall i' th' Wood, a church, St Mary the Virgin's Church, Deane, farmhouses, farm buildings, houses and cottages. The major industry in the town was fine cotton spinning. At one time there were about 160 cotton mills, of which only a few survive, they are listed, and are now used for other purposes. The majority of the listed buildings are houses, mainly those provided for workers in the mills and other industries, including engineering. The other listed buildings include larger houses and associated structures, churches and items in the churchyards, bridges, shops, civic buildings, hotels and public houses, schools, railway viaducts, banks, statues, memorials, milestones, and two groups of telephone kiosks.

== Key ==
Grade	Criteria
I	Buildings of exceptional interest, sometimes considered to be internationally important
II*	Particularly important buildings of more than special interest
II	Buildings of national importance and special interest

== Buildings ==
Name and location	Photograph	Date	Notes	Grade
Old Hall Farmhouse and outbuilding 53.58636°N 2.49227°W		Medieval	This was probably the gatehouse range of a courtyard house, and was later remodelled and extended. It is in stone with a slate roof, and has two storeys, three bays, a wing, and an outshut. The entrance in the angle has a moulded archway, and there is a similar archway on the garden front. Some windows are round-headed and blocked, or mullioned, and others are replacements.	II
Smithills Hall; 53.60242°N 2.45592°W		Early 14th century	Originally a medieval hall house, it was later extended to become a country house, and subsequently used for other purposes. The original parts are timber framed, and it is now in stone with stone flagged roofs. The house has three ranges around an open courtyard, and the great hall is in the north range, the east and west wings extending to the south. Most of the house has two storeys, and the windows are mullioned or mullioned and transomed. Other features include gables, bay windows, and oriel windows.	I
St Mary's Church; 53.56885°N 2.46453°W		14th century	The oldest part of the church is the tower, most of it dating from the 15th century and in Perpendicular style. The clerestory was added in 1833, and the church was restored in 1884, when the chancel was lengthened. The church is in stone with a lead roof, and consists of a nave with a clerestory, north and south aisles, a south porch, a chancel with a north chapel, and a west tower. The tower has a west doorway with an ogee arch, a clock face on the south side, and an embattled parapet with corner pinnacles. There are also embattled parapets on the aisles and the nave, and the east window has seven lights.	II*
Hall i' th' Wood; 53.60049°N 2.41895°W		Early 16th century	Originally a manor house, it was extended in 1591 and in 1648, restored in about 1900 by Grayson and Ould for Lord Leverhulme, and later used as a museum. It was originally timber framed with a stone flagged roof, and the later additions are in stone. There are two storeys, and on the south front is a two-storey porch with a round-arched entrance. On the porch, and elsewhere, are obelisk finials. Other features include windows that are mullioned or mullioned and transomed.	I
10 Firwood Fold; 53.59582°N 2.40615°W		16th century (probable)	The house, which was the birthplace of Samuel Crompton, is timber framed, clad in stone, and has a thatched roof. There is one storey with an attic, and the house has a gabled front. On the ground floor is a four-light mullioned window, and above is a two-light horizontally-sliding sash window.	I
15 Firwood Fold; 53.59547°N 2.40590°W		16th century (probable)	A house in stone, extended in brick, incorporating at least one cruck truss, and with a slate roof. There are two storeys and three bays, the west bay being an addition. The doorway is in the centre of the original part, and the windows are replacements.	II*
Random Cottage; 53.58307°N 2.46921°W	—	16th century (probable)	Originally a farmhouse, later a cottage with an outbuilding, it is in stone with a stone flagged roof. There are two storeys and two bays. Most of the windows are mullioned, and one is also transomed.	II*
Former gatehouse to Lostock Hall (demolished) with cottage range to rear 53.57716°N 2.52031°W		1591	The former gatehouse served Lostock Hall, which has been demolished, and the cottage at the rear dates from 1810; they are in stone with slate roofs. The gatehouse has three storeys and three bays, and a central segmental arch, now infilled, with moulded jambs. This is flanked by sash windows, and elsewhere the windows are mullioned and transomed. On each floor are coupled columns, Tuscan on the ground floor, Ionic on the middle floor, and Corinthian on the top floor. The gatehouse also has moulded cornices, string courses, and a scalloped parapet. The cottage forms a rear wing; it has two storeys, three bays, and sash windows.	II*
Haulgh Hall; 53.57564°N 2.41887°W		1597	The house is partly in timber framed and partly in brick, and has a stone-flagged roof. There are two storeys and three bays, one being a later addition at the rear. It has a timber framed porch, and at one end is an exposed cruck frame. The windows have been renewed.	II
7 Horrocks Fold (The Old Farm); 53.61388°N 2.45121°W	—	Early 17th century (probable)	A house later extended and altered, it is in stone with a slate roof, two storeys and an L-shaped plan. The main range has two bays, with a wing extending forwards. The windows are mullioned, and over the inserted doorway is a single round-headed window.	II
Hollin Hey; 53.59487°N 2.48093°W		Early 17th century (probable)	A farmhouse in rendered stone with a slate roof. There are two storeys, a main range of two bays, a cross-wing, and a later rear wing. In the centre of the main range is a gabled porch with a four-centred arch, and the windows are mullioned.	II
Old Man and Scythe public house 53.57954°N 2.42629°W		1636	The public house was remodelled in the 20th century. It is basically timber framed with applied mock timber framing, and has a slate roof. There are two storeys and four bays, the outer bays are gabled. In the left bay is an oriel window on the ground floor and a mullioned and transomed window above. The right bay contains a two-storey canted bay window. The central two bays contain a round-headed doorway, a segmental-headed archway and a three-light window, and on the upper floor are casement windows.	II
Gate piers and gates, Hall i' th' Wood; 53.60036°N 2.41867°W		c. 1648	The gate piers are in ashlar stone, and are rusticated and surmounted by foliate urns. The gates are in wrought iron.	II
Lightbounds; 53.59762°N 2.47078°W		17th century (probable)	The house was significantly remodelled and extended in the 19th century. It is in rendered stone with some slate hanging, and has roofs partly of stone flags and partly in Welsh slate. There are two storeys, and the main range has a front of five bays. The windows in the earlier parts are mullioned and in the later parts they are sashes.	II
Brown Hill; 53.59248°N 2.38146°W	—	1670	A farmhouse built over several phases, it is in red sandstone, partly rendered, with a concrete tiled roof. There are two storeys, four bays, and single-depth plan. Some of the windows are sashes, and others are replacements.	II
Bryan Hey Farmhouse; 53.61007°N 2.46831°W		Late 17th century (probable)	A stone farmhouse with a Welsh slate roof and two storeys. There are three bays, an 18th-century one-bay extension, and outbuildings forming a rear wing. On the front is a two-storey porch with a moulded off-centre archway and a round-headed mullioned window with a hood mould in the gable. The other windows on the front are also mullioned. At the rear are external steps leading to a loft.	II
Walsh Fold; 53.6272°N 2.39597°W		Late 17th century	A late-17th-century stone farmhouse in dressed stone with quoins and a stone slate roof. There are two storeys and four bays. Most of the windows are mullioned	II*
11, 12 and 14 Firwood Fold; 53.59582°N 2.40597°W		Late 17th to early 18th century	A row of four, later three houses, in two builds. They are in stone with a slate roof, two storeys, and a double-depth plan. Nos. 11 and 12 form a mirrored pair with one bay each. The doorways are in the outer part with wedge lintels, there are sash windows on the ground floor and casement windows above. No. 14 has two bays, with a canted bay window to the left of the doorway, and mullioned windows to the right. On the upper floor are two gabled dormers.	II
Sheephouse Farmhouse, cottages and barn 53.60403°N 2.46894°W		Late 17th or early 18th century (probable)	The farmhouse was extended in the 19th century, the cottages date from the 18th century, and the barn is dated 1862 with extensions in 1901. They are in stone and have roofs partly of slate and partly stone-flagged. The original farmhouse has two storeys, two bays and mullioned windows. The cottages are at the rear and have one bay each and windows with plain stone lintels. The barn has two ridges, segmental-arched openings, and a datestone.	II
Pendlebury Farmhouse, Cottage and farm buildings 53.60551°N 2.47318°W	—	1712	The buildings are in stone with roofs of Welsh and Westmorland green slate. The house and cottage have two storeys, the house with two bays, and the cottage with one, and the windows are replaced casements. The farm buildings are on both sides with the main barn to the right; this contains doorways, windows, a pitching hole, and square vents. The other, and older, barn to the left has a doorway, a window, a cart entrance, and a hay loft entry.	II
1–4 Firwood; 53.59558°N 2.40551°W		Early 18th century (probable)	A row of four houses with two storeys and a double-depth plan. No. 1 is in stone and has one bay, and Nos. 2–4 are in brick on a stone plinth, and have two bays each. Most of the windows on the ground floor are small-paned and fixed, on the upper floor they are casements, and all have stone sills and lintels.	II
3, 4 and 5 Hill Top; 53.59707°N 2.44622°W		Early 18th century	A row of three houses in red sandstone, with roofs of slate and stone flags, and with coped gables. There are two storeys, two bays and a cross-wing on the right. The doorways have moulded architraves and stone jambs, and the windows that were formerly mullioned contain replacements.	II
6–9 Hill Top; 53.59691°N 2.44591°W		Early 18th century	A terrace of four houses, No. 6 at the left being added later in the 18th century, in red sandstone with a stone-flagged roof. There are two storeys, and each house has one bay. The original houses have mullioned windows, and in No. 6 the windows are casements. The doorways are in architraves.	II
Lilac Cottage; 53.61392°N 2.44988°W		Early 18th century	The cottage was extended to the left in the 19th century, and is in stone with stone-flagged roofs. The earlier part is on a boulder plinth, with quoins, two storeys, and inserted windows. The later part is higher with two storeys and a basement, two bays, a gabled porch, and replaced windows.	II
759, 759A and 761–773 Chorley Old Road; 53.58982°N 2.47257°W		c. 1730	A terrace of nine houses, built in phases up to about 1860, in stone with roofs of stone flags, slates or tiles, and they have two storeys. At the left end, No. 759 has a canted corner, a doorway and a shop window with moulded architraves, and the next three houses have round-headed doorways. No. 765 was originally a toll house, and is canted forward. The next two houses are lower and have flat-headed doorways, and the last two houses are higher, also with flat-headed doorways. The windows vary; some are sashes, there are horizontally-sliding sashes, an oriel window, and some windows are replacements.	II
1 and 2 Hill Top; 53.59682°N 2.44630°W		1735	Originally one house, later divided into two, in red sandstone on a chamfered plinth, with large quoins and a stone-flagged roof. There are two storeys with an attic, and two bays. The doorways are in the centre with plain architraves and are flanked by casement windows. On the upper floor are five-light mullioned windows.	II
8 and 9 Firwood; 53.59588°N 2.40628°W		18th century	A pair of houses incorporating material from earlier buildings. No. 9 is in stone, and No. 8 is in brick with two exposed cruck blades on stone plinths. The roofs are slated, the houses have two storeys, one bay each, and a double-depth plan. The windows in No. 9 are mullioned. On the upper floor of No. 8 are horizontally-sliding sash windows, and on the ground floor is a casement window.	II
54, 56 and 58 Harvey Street; 53.59663°N 2.44564°W		Mid-18th century	A row of three houses with angle quoins and a slate roof. There are two storeys and three bays with an additional bay added in about 1980. The doorways have plain architraves, and the windows are mullioned.	II
Horrobin Cottage; 53.59406°N 2.48439°W		Mid-18th century	A stone cottage that has a slate roof with coped gables and moulded kneelers. There are two storeys, mullioned windows, a stair window at the rear, and a lean-to on each side.	II
25 Market Street; 53.57943°N 2.42963°W		Late 18th century	A shop with living accommodation above, in brick with a slate roof. There are three storeys and two bays. On the ground floor is a shop front, and the upper floors contain sash windows with flat-arched brick heads.	II
31 Churchgate; 53.57979°N 2.42562°W		Late 18th century	A brick shop with a slate roof, two low storeys, and two bays, with a one-bay extension to the left. On the front is a doorway flanked by slightly bowed windows in wooden architraves, and the other windows are sashes.	II
31–40 Hollins; 53.54917°N 2.44051°W		Late 18th century	A terrace of ten brick cottages, mainly rendered, with a slate roof, and two storeys. Most cottages have one bay, and No. 31 has a one-bay extension. The doorways have plain architraves, and some have porches. The windows are casements, those on the ground floor with segmental heads. The garden wall to Nos. 31–38 consists of upright stone slabs fixed with iron bolts.	II
Barn, Bryan Hey Farm; 53.61006°N 2.46808°W		Late 18th century (probable)	The barn is in stone with a slate roof. It has a doorway and a window with architraves, an outshut porch with double doors, and beyond that a single windows and ventilation slits.	II
Bate's Houses; 53.54598°N 2.45913°W		Late 18th century	A terrace of five brick houses with a slate roof, two low storeys and one bay each. Most of the doors and windows are replacements in the original openings. In the gable end is a re-used datestone.	II
Edge family tomb 53.56870°N 2.46435°W		Late 18th century	The tomb to the memory of members of the Edge family is in the churchyard of St Mary's Church. It is in stone and consists of three slabs on a base with reeded moulding making panels that are decorated with circles and ovals. The slabs carry inscriptions.	II
Firwood Mews; 53.59542°N 2.40562°W		Late 18th century	Originally a stable block, later a row of five houses in brick on a stone plinth with a stone-flagged roof. There are two storeys and six bays. On the ground floor are doorways and windows, on the upper floor are bull's eyes windows and gabled dormers. In the roof are four glazed vents.	II
Garden wall, 25 Wood Street; 53.57861°N 2.42494°W	—	Late 18th century (probable)	The wall runs along the south and east sides of the garden. It consists of up-ended stone slabs linked by iron bolts.	II
King's Head public house 53.56821°N 2.46601°W		Late 18th century	The public house was extended in the 19th century. It is roughcast with roofs partly slated and partly tiled, and with two storeys. The original part has three bays with a door in an architrave to the left and a single-storey extension in front of the third bay. To the right is a taller extension with a lean-to porch. Most of the windows are sashes.	II
Pendlebury Farmhouse and farm buildings 53.57042°N 2.52147°W		Late 18th century	The buildings are in stone with stone-flagged roofs. The farmhouse is rendered and has two storeys, two bays, a double-depth plan, and cottages to the left and at the rear. The central door has a fanlight, an architrave with a keystone, and the windows are casements. The farm building to the right incorporates an earlier building with an inglenook and a bressumer, and at right angles is a barn dated 1832.	II
Scant Row; 53.59573°N 2.49880°W		Late 18th century	A terrace of nine stone houses with a Welsh slate roof. They have two storeys, a double-depth plan, and each house has one bay, other than the house on the extreme right, which has two. The doorways have stone lintels, and the windows are renewed windows.	II
Walls, railings, gate piers and gates, St George's Church; 53.58212°N 2.43104°W		Late 18th century	The gate piers at the entrance to the churchyard are in ashlar stone, and have cast iron lanterns and gates. They are flanked by stone walls with spearhead railings.	II
15 and 17 Wood Street; 53.57868°N 2.42588°W		1786	A pair of rendered brick houses in a terrace, later offices, with a slate roof and three storeys. No. 15 has three bays, No. 17 has two, and between the houses is a passage entry. The doorways have pediments, and above the doors are traceried fanlights. The windows are replacements.	II
Silverwell House; 53.57768°N 2.42553°W	—	1790	A brick house with a moulded eaves cornice and a brick roof. There are three storeys and three bays. On the front is a doorway with a pediment flanked by full-height canted bay windows. At the rear is a doorway with a moulded wooden architrave and a flat entablature. There are two round-headed stair windows, and the other windows are sashes.	II
14 and 16 Wood Street; 53.57856°N 2.42588°W		c. 1790	A pair of brick houses in a terrace, later offices, with a moulded eaves cornice, a slate roof and a slate-hung gable. There are three storeys, No. 14 has three bays, and No. 16 has two. The doorways are in the outer bays, and each has pilasters and a pediment with a modillioned cornice. Above the doors are traceried fanlights. In the left bay of No. 14 is a passage entry, and in the right bay of No. 16 is a canted bay window. The windows are sashes. No. 16 was the birthplace of William Lever.	II
18 and 20 Wood Street; 53.57860°N 2.42553°W		c. 1790	A pair of brick houses in a terrace, later offices, with a moulded eaves cornice, and a slate roof. There are three storeys and a total of eleven bays. In the centre is a segmental-headed carriage entrance. Each house has a symmetrical front and a central doorway with engaged columns and pediments, and above the doors are fanlights. The windows are sashes.	II
St George's Church; 53.58218°N 2.43057°W		1794–1796	The church is in Georgian style, alterations were made between 1908 and 1910, and it is now redundant. The church is built in brick with stone dressings and a slate roof. It consists of a two-storey nave, a shallow chancel, a south chapel, and a west tower. The tower has four stages, a pedimented west doorway with a traceried fanlight, an ogee-headed window, clock faces on four sides, and a stone parapet with ball finials. Along the sides are two tiers of round-headed windows, and in the chapel are two Venetian windows.	II*
Canal milestone 8 miles from Manchester; 53.55448°N 2.37434°W		1797	The milestone is on the south side of the Manchester, Bolton and Bury Canal, and is in buff sandstone. It has a rectangular cross-section with a flat top, and is about 0.5 metres (1 ft 8 in) in height. On the front is inscribed "M" and "8" in deeply-incised lettering.	II
Canal milestone 8¼ miles from Manchester; 53.55487°N 2.36851°W		1797	The milestone is on the south side of the Manchester, Bolton and Bury Canal, and is in buff sandstone. It has a rectangular cross-section with a flat top, and is about 0.5 metres (1 ft 8 in) in height. On the front is inscribed "M" and "8¼" in lettering.	II
Canal milestone 8½ miles from Manchester; 53.55647°N 2.36371°W		1797	The milestone is on the south side of the Manchester, Bolton and Bury Canal, and is in buff sandstone. It has a rectangular cross-section with a flat top, and is about 0.5 metres (1 ft 8 in) in height. On the front is inscribed "M" and "8½" in deeply-incised lettering.	II
Canal milestone 10¾ miles from Manchester; 53.56856°N 2.32136°W		1797	The milestone is on the north side of the Manchester, Bolton and Bury Canal, and is in buff sandstone. It has a rectangular cross-section with a flat top, and is about 0.5 metres (1 ft 8 in) in height. On the front is inscribed "M" and "10¾" in deeply-incised lettering.	II
Canal milestone 11 miles from Manchester; 53.57028°N 2.31675°W		1797	The milestone is on the south side of the Manchester, Bolton and Bury Canal, and is in buff sandstone. It has a rectangular cross-section with a flat top, and is about 0.5 metres (1 ft 8 in) in height. On the front is inscribed "M" and "11" in deeply-incised lettering.	II
22 Mawdsley Street; 53.57742°N 2.42822°W		c. 1800	A house, later a shop, in brick with a slate roof. There are three storeys and two bays. In the right bay is a doorway with a traceried fanlight and a pediment. The windows have flat-arched heads and stone sills; on the top floor they are casements and on the middle floor they are sashes.	II
37 Mawdsley Street; 53.57702°N 2.42769°W		c. 1800	A house, later offices, in brick with a band above the ground floor, and a slate roof. There are three storeys and three bays. In the left bay is a doorway with engaged Ionic columns, a plain frieze and a cornice. The windows are sashes with flat stone heads and stone sills.	II
Former Methodist Church (Genting Casino); 53.58251°N 2.42856°W		1803	The former church, later used as a casino, is in brick with stone dressings and a slate roof. It has two storeys and fronts of five bays. In the entrance front are three doorways, the central one with a pediment, and the outer ones with flat entablatures. At the top is a pedimented gable containing a quatrefoil, swags and a datestone. The windows are round-headed.	II
10 and 12 Grove Street; 53.59305°N 2.44163°W	—	1808	A pair of sandstone houses in a terrace with a slate roof. They have two storeys, No. 10 has a cellar, and each house has two bays. On the left are angle quoins, and to the right is the springing of an elliptical archway. They have round-headed doorways with plain architraves and keystones, there is a mullioned window to the cellar, and the other windows are replacements. On the upper floor is a moulded inscribed plaque.	II
15 and 17 Silverwell Street; 53.57821°N 2.42564°W		1810	A pair of brick houses with a slate roof, later used as offices. They have two storeys and five bays. In the centre is a segmentally-arched carriage entry, and the windows are sashes.	II
19–25 Silverwell Street; 53.57832°N 2.42529°W		1810	A terrace of four brick houses with a slate roof, later used as offices. They have two storeys and eleven bays, and in the centre is a segmentally-arched carriage entry. There is a continuous sill band between the storeys, and a moulded eaves cornice. In the left two bays is a wide doorway with a segmental-arched head, and the other doorways are narrow with round arches. Most of the windows are sashes.	II
Scott House; 53.57839°N 2.42507°W		1810	A brick house with a slate roof, later used as an office. It has two storeys, a front of one bay and a return of four bays. On the front is a doorway with a segmental arch and a fanlight, and in the return is a doorway with a moulded wooden architrave. There are inscribed plaques of the front and the return, and the windows are sashes.	II
St Peter's Jubilee Sunday School; 53.59226°N 2.46248°W		1810	Originally a school, later used for other purposes, it is in stone with stone-flagged roofs. There are two storeys, a front of nine bays, and a later parallel range at the rear. The right two bays formed the schoolmaster's house, it has rusticated quoins, a band, and a moulded gutter cornice. The three bays to the left project slightly under a pediment, and contain two doorways with fanlights. The windows are mullioned and transomed.	II
St Helena Mill; 53.58018°N 2.43435°W		1820	The former cotton spinning mill is in stone with a slate roof. It has three storeys and sides of eleven and three bays. The windows have flat heads and stone lintels, and in the gable end are taking-in doors on each floor.	II
20 Mawdsley Street; 53.57751°N 2.42825°W		c. 1820	A house on a corner site, later offices, it is in brick on a stone plinth, with bands between the storeys, a moulded eaves cornice, and a slate roof. There are three storeys, four bays on Mawdsley Street, one bay on Cheapside Square, and a rear wing. The doorway has Ionic columns with foliate capitals and a pediment. In the right return is a Venetian window, and the other windows are sashes with flat-arched heads.	II
23 Mawdsley Street; 53.57738°N 2.42791°W		c. 1820	A house, later offices, in rendered brick with a moulded eaves cornice, and a slate roof. There are three storeys and four irregular bays. In the centre is a segmental-headed doorway in an architrave, with engaged fluted columns and an entablature with a decorative frieze. The windows are sashes in architraves.	II
44–80 St George's Road; 53.58193°N 2.43194°W		c. 1820	A terrace of 19 houses in brick with moulded eaves cornices, and slate roofs. There are two storeys, and each house has two bays. The details vary, and most have round-headed doorways, some of which are paired, with fluting shafts and fanlights. Some have canted bay windows, one of which is full-height, and the windows are sashes.	II
45–53 Chorley New Road; 53.58168°N 2.44317°W		c. 1820	A row of five houses in a terrace with differing features, in brick with stone dressings, sill bands, fanlights, slate roofs, and two storeys. No. 45 has four bays, and a round-headed doorway with an architrave of fluted columns. No. 47 has two bays, and No. 49 has a hipped roof, four bays, an infilled carriage entrance, and a round-headed doorway that has an architrave with fluted shafts. Nos. 51 and 53 are a mirrored pair with six bays, and flat-headed doorways with panelled jambs and entablatures.	II
Former Holy Trinity Church; 53.57391°N 2.42687°W		1823–1825	Originally a Commissioners' church designed by Philip Hardwick in Gothic Revival style, it is now redundant. The church is built in stone with a slate roof, and consists of a nave, a shallow chancel, an east vestry, and a west tower. The tower has four stages, angle buttresses, a west doorway, clock faces, and a parapet with crocketed pinnacles at the corners and centres. Along the sides of the church is an embattled parapet and crocketed pinnacles, and inside the church are galleries on three sides.	II
Former exchange and library 53.57778°N 2.42926°W		1824–25	The building, later used for other purposes, is in ashlar stone with a slate roof, and was designed by Richard Lane. It has two storeys and sides of five and three bays. In the long front the outer bays are slightly projecting, and flanking the centre bay are giant Ionic columns. The central doorway has a moulded architrave with an entablature. The windows are sashes, between them are carved panels, and the ends of the building are pedimented.	II
1–6 Hoyle Street; 53.60224°N 2.43377°W		Early 19th century	A terrace of six stone houses with a slate roof. They have two storeys and one bay each. The doorways have plain architraves, and the windows, which are mainly replacements, have plain lintels.	II
5 Firwood Fold; 53.59571°N 2.40615°W		Early 19th century	Originally a school, later converted into two houses and then into one dwelling, it is in stone with a stone-flagged roof, two storeys and two bays. In the centre are paired doorways with pointed arches, and on both floors are casement windows with three pointed lights. All the openings have hood moulds.	II
21–35 Gaskell Street; 53.58503°N 2.44023°W		Early 19th century	A terrace of eight houses in stone with slate roofs. They have two storeys, and each house has one bay, and blocked cellars. In each house steps lead up to a doorway in an architrave, and the windows are replacements.	II
Churchills public house 53.57061°N 2.42088°W		Early 19th century	The public house is in brick on a stone plinth with a slate roof, hipped on the right. There are two storeys and three bays. The doorway has a recessed architrave with engaged Tuscan columns and a radial fanlight. On the upper floor are sash windows, and the ground floor windows have been renewed. Now empty and derelict.	II
Gate piers and railings, Former Methodist Church; 53.58236°N 2.42841°W		Early 19th century	A chamfered stone wall encloses the area around the former church, and has cast iron railings with spear heads, urn finials and scrolled braces. The gate piers have pyramidal caps.	II
Gate piers and gates, St Peter's Church; 53.57957°N 2.42445°W		Early 19th century (probable)	The main gate piers are in rusticated ashlar, each with a quatrefoil frieze and a stepped top, and there are simpler outer piers. The gates are decorative and in cast iron, and there is an elaborate wrought iron overthrow.	II
Pair of cottages, Harricroft Farm; 53.60440°N 2.45173°W		Early 19th century	The cottages are in stone with a hipped slate roof, and have two storeys and two bays each. Both cottages have a central doorway, and replaced windows with flat stone lintels.	II
Pool Place; 53.59173°N 2.45154°W		Early 19th century	A row of three stone houses with slate roofs. They have two storeys and each house has one bay. The doorways are round-headed and have architraves with keystones, and the windows are replacements with wedge lintels.	II
Three bridges over Dean Brook and walls 53.60179°N 2.47628°W		Early 19th century	The bridges crossing Dean Brook are in stone, and each has a single segmental arch with rounded and pyramidal copings. They are connected by walls with similar copings.	II
Old Town Hall; 53.58260°N 2.42763°W		1826	The former town hall of Little Bolton, later used for other purposes, is in ashlar stone with a slate roof. It has two storeys and fronts of three bays on St George's Street and five on All Saints Street. On the St George's Street front is a central doorway with a rusticated surround and a modillion cornice, pilasters and a central pediment. The front on All Saints Street has a central portico with coupled Tuscan columns. The windows are sashes.	II
1 Ainsworth Lane; 53.58075°N 2.40753°W	—	c. 1830	House built in two storeys of coursed and squared stone with a stone flagged roof. It has a 3-window front with a central entrance, all with 4-centred arched heads. There are 2-light casement windows with small panes in the lower ones and a narrow light over the doorway. A pedimented dormer and end wall stacks are set in a shallow pitched roof.	II
1–6 First Street; 53.59945°N 2.47251°W		c. 1830	A terrace of six stone houses with a slate roof, two storeys, eleven bays, and a double-depth plan. On the front the doorways have moulded architraves with entablature hoods, and the windows are replacements with stone lintels. At the rear the doorways have simpler architraves.	II
2, 3 and 4 Park Row; 53.61144°N 2.42935°W	—	c. 1830	A row of three houses, the left house being added in the later 19th century. They are in stone with a slate roof, and have two storeys. The original houses have two bays, and the additional house has one. The doorways have plain architraves, and the windows are replacements with wedge lintels.	II
6–10 and 12A Park Row; 53.61153°N 2.42928°W	—	c. 1830	A row of four stone houses with slate roofs. They have two storeys, a double-depth plan, No. 12A is set at right angles with its gable towards the road, and each house has one bay. The doorways have plain architraves. There is one original sash window, and the other windows are replacements with wedge lintels.	II
7–12 First Street; 53.59949°N 2.47227°W		c. 1830	A terrace of six stone houses with a slate roof, two storeys, eleven bays, and a double-depth plan. On the front the doorways have moulded architraves with entablature hoods, and the windows are replacements with stone lintels. At the rear the doorways have simpler architraves.	II
13–19 Chorley Old Road; 53.58249°N 2.44128°W		c. 1830	A terrace of four red brick houses, some used as offices, with a slate roof. They have two storeys, and each house has two bays, a round-headed doorway with reeded engaged columns in an architrave, and a fanlight. The fanlights in Nos. 13 and 15 have wrought iron tracery in the fanlight, and Nos. 17 and 19 have bay windows. The windows in No. 13 are sashes, the other houses have replaced windows.	II
18–23 Second Street; 53.59959°N 2.47190°W		c. 1830	A terrace of six stone houses, originally back to back houses, they have a slate roof, two storeys, and eleven bays. The doorways have moulded architraves with entablature hoods, and the windows are replacements with wedge lintels.	II
22 and 22A Chorley New Road; 53.58227°N 2.44222°W		c. 1830	A red brick house, later an office, on an ashlar plinth with a sill band, a plain frieze, a moulded gutter cornice, and a Welsh slate roof. There are two storeys with a basement, and a symmetrical front of three bays. Steps lead up to a central doorway that has an architrave with half-columns and fluted capitals, and a fanlight with wrought iron tracery. The windows are sashes with flat arched heads.	II
24 Chorley New Road; 53.58225°N 2.44238°W		c. 1830	A house, later an office, in rendered brick with a Welsh slate roof. It has two storeys with a basement, two bays, and a parallel rear range. The doorway in the right bay has an architrave with half-columns and fluted capitals, and a fanlight. In the left bay is a semicircular segmental bay window with six columns, a frieze, a cornice, and a parapet with upstands. The windows are sashes and on the roof is a dormer.	II
29–34 Third Street; 53.59970°N 2.47153°W		c. 1830	A terrace of six stone houses, originally back to back houses, they have a slate roof, two storeys, and eleven bays. The doorways have moulded architraves with entablature hoods, and the windows are replacements with wedge lintels.	II
35–40 Fourth Street; 53.59980°N 2.47117°W		c. 1830	A terrace of six stone houses with a slate roof, two storeys, eleven bays, and a double-depth plan. On the front the doorways have moulded architraves with entablature hoods, and the windows are replacements with flat arched heads. At the rear the doorways have simpler architraves.	II
41–46 Fourth Street; 53.59984°N 2.47093°W		c. 1830	A terrace of six stone houses with a slate roof, two storeys, eleven bays, and a double-depth plan. On the front the doorways have moulded architraves with entablature hoods, and the windows are replacements with stone lintels. At the rear the doorways have simpler architraves.	II
47–51 Fifth Street; 53.59996°N 2.47058°W		c. 1830	A terrace of five stone houses on a sloping site with a slate roof. Some houses have two storeys with a basement, others have three or four storeys, and each house has two bays and a double-depth plan. The doorways have moulded architraves with an entablature hood, and the windows are replacements with flat heads. No. 51 has a stone terrace and cast iron railings.	II
59–63 Barrow Bridge Road; 53.60086°N 2.47113°W		c. 1830	A house and a terrace of six cottages in stone with slate roofs and two storeys. No. 59, the house, has angle pilasters, an eaves cornice, three bays, and a doorway with a moulded architrave and a fanlight. The cottages have one bay each, and replacement doors and windows with stone lintels.	II
65–68 Barrow Bridge Road; 53.60113°N 2.47111°W		c. 1830	A terrace of four stone houses with a slate roof and two storeys. Each house has one bay and a double-depth plan, and Nos. 65 and 68 have added porches. Most of the doors and windows are replacements; the doors have plain stone lintels, and the windows have wedge lintels.	II
591 and 593 Halliwell Road; 53.59597°N 2.45048°W		c. 1830	A pair of stone houses with a slate roof, one storey with attics and high cellars, a double-depth plan, and one bay each. On the left of each house is a doorway with a moulded architrave and a fanlight approached by steps with railings. To the right is a sash window, in the cellars are mullioned windows, and in the attics are windows with segmental-arched dormers on the roof.	II
Beggar's Acre; 53.59858°N 2.45541°W		c. 1830	A stone house with a slate roof, one storey, two bays, and a parallel rear range. The central doorway is flanked by windows with pointed arches and plain architraves, and there is a similar window in the right gable end.	II
Bosco House; 53.60273°N 2.44260°W		c. 1830	A large house, partly the remodelling of an earlier house, and partly incorporating an earlier coach house and stable wing, it is stuccoed with stone quoins, slate-hung at the rear, and with a slate roof. There are two storeys and an entrance front of three bays. On the front is a gabled porch with mullioned windows to the left and a bay window to the right. The garden front has three gables and a central full-height bow window.	II
Rose Cottage, 75 Barrow Bridge Road; 53.60198°N 2.47453°W		c. 1830	A stone house with a hipped slate roof, it has two storeys, three bays, and single-storey one-bay extensions with hipped roofs on each side. The doorway has a moulded architrave and a fanlight, and the windows are replacements with wedge lintels.	II
Bay Mare public house and 645 and 647 Blackburn Road; 53.60334°N 2.43261°W		c. 1830	This consists of a public house and a terrace of six houses, two of which have been incorporated into the pub, and two at the south end which are back-to-back houses. They are in stone with slate roofs, and have two storeys, one house with a cellar, and five bays. Steps lead up to the doorways; in the pub these are round headed with an architrave, and in the houses they have flat heads and plain surrounds. The windows are replacements.	II
The Finishers Arms and 487–493 Church Road; 53.59156°N 2.46814°W		c. 1830	A public house and a terrace of houses in stone with stone-flagged roofs and two storeys. The pub and first house, which is incorporated into the pub, have four bays, and each of the other houses has two bays each. The doorways have moulded architraves, and the windows, most of which are replacements, have wedge lintels.	II
The Mews No. 2: The Mansion; 53.58282°N 2.45628°W		c. 1830	A large house, later a hotel, in stone, with two storeys, and an irregular plan with three parallel ranges. On the front is a gabled porch with a Gothic arch and a traceried fanlight. Most of the windows are mullioned or mullioned and transomed, and some are sashes. Other features include an oriel window, gables, some of which are stepped, and a canted bay window with an embattled parapet.	II
55–58 Barrow Bridge Road; 53.60068°N 2.47065°W		c. 1831	A group of four stone houses with Welsh slate roofs and two storeys. There are seven bays on the front and three on the side. The windows, which have stone lintels, and the doors are replacements.	II
76 and 77 Barrow Bridge Road; 53.60198°N 2.47482°W		c. 1831	A pair of stone houses with a hipped slate roof, two storeys, three bays each, and flanking single-bay extension with hipped roofs. In the centre of each house is an added porch, and the windows are replacements, some containing stained glass.	II
78 Barrow Bridge Road; 53.60197°N 2.47508°W		c. 1831	A stone house with a hipped slate roof, two storeys, three bays, and a single-bay extension with a hipped roof to the right. In the centre of each house is an added porch, and the windows are casements dating from about 1930, some containing stained glass.	II
79 and 80 Barrow Bridge Road; 53.60197°N 2.47534°W		c. 1831	A pair of stone houses with a hipped slate roof, two storeys, a front of three bays each, a single-bay extension with a hipped roof to the right, and a rear wing to No. 80 with a porch in the angle. The doorways are in the right bay of each house, the windows have wedge lintels, some are the original sash windows, and others are replacements.	II
Farm buildings, Harricroft Farm; 53.60463°N 2.45185°W		1832	The buildings consist of an L-shaped dated barn, shippons and a stable, dating possibly from earlier, all almost enclosing a yard. They are in stone with slate roofs. The barn has a two-storey south range, and its openings include doors, windows, ventilation slits, and pitching holes, and there are two semicircular windows each with an architrave and a keystone. The stable has been partly rebuilt in brick.	II
251 Ashworth Lane; 53.60558°N 2.42172°W		1833	Originally a school, later a private house, it is in stone with a slate roof, and a single storey. On the left is a projecting gabled wing, to its right is a two-storey porch, and further to the right is a four-bay range. The gable end has a two-light traceried window, and above it is a moulded string course. In the porch is a round-headed entrance, and above it is a plain parapet and a moulded string course. In the right range are four windows and buttresses.	II
2–16 Eleanor Street; 53.60517°N 2.42253°W		c. 1830–1840	A terrace of eight stone houses with a hipped slate roof, and two storeys, that were originally back-to-back houses. Each house has one bay, and above the central two bays is a pediment containing a round-headed window. The other windows have flat heads, some have the original sash windows, but most windows have been renewed. The doorways have plain architraves.	II
12–30 Park Row; 53.61192°N 2.42900°W		c. 1830–1840	A terrace of ten stone houses with slate roofs, two storeys, two bays each, and a double-depth plan. The doorways have round-arched architraves with keystones and plain fanlights. The windows have wedge lintels, some are original sashes, and the others are replacements.	II
32 and 34 Park Row; 53.61214°N 2.42880°W	—	c. 1830–1840	A pair of stone houses with a plain eaves cornice, a slate roof, two storeys, two bays each, and a double-depth plan. The doorways have moulded architraves and fanlights. The ground floor windows are replacements, and on the upper floor are sash windows.	II
36–42 Park Row; 53.61224°N 2.42872°W	—	c. 1830–1840	A terrace of four stone houses with a moulded eaves cornice, a slate roof, two storeys, one bay each, and a double-depth plan. The doorways have moulded architraves, and the windows have stone lintels, with sashes in some and replacements in others.	II
230, 232, and 234 Ashworth Lane; 53.60531°N 2.42302°W		c. 1835	A terrace of three stone houses with a slate roof, built in two phases. They have two storeys, one bay each, and doorways with plain architraves. No. 234 has retained its sash windows, and the windows in the other houses are renewals; all have wedge lintels.	II
Whitehill Cottages; 53.61079°N 2.44424°W		Early to mid-19th century	A terrace of seven stone houses and a shop with a slate roof, two storeys. and a double-depth plan. No. 2, the shop, has two bays, and the others have one bay each. The doorways are plain, and the windows, some of which are sashes and others are replacements, have wedge lintels. In the gable end is a shop window.	II
Haulgh Cottage; 53.57794°N 2.41360°W	—	1836	The house is in stone, partly rendered, with a slate roof, two storeys and five bays. The entrance is in the end facing the street, through a gabled porch with a datestone. On the front are two gables and two gabled dormers. Most of the windows are mullioned or mullioned and transomed, some are mullioned, and some are renewals.	II
Mere Hall; 53.58733°N 2.43853°W		1837	A large house, later used for other purposes, it is in brick with stone dressings, full-height angle pilasters, string courses, and hipped slate roofs. There are two storeys and an irregular plan. The block containing the entrance has three bays and a portico with paired fluted Doric columns. The windows are sashes. The garden front has five bays, and contains a central full-height semicircular bow window.	II
St Peter's Church, Halliwell; 53.59130°N 2.46615°W		1838–1840	In 1844 the transepts and chancel were added, and the tower rebuilt. The church is in stone with slate roofs, and consists of a nave, a north porch, transepts, a chancel with a south vestry, and a west tower. The church has four unequal stages, clasping buttresses, a west doorway with a stepped moulded arch, a clock face, and corner pinnacles. The windows are lancets.	II
1, 3 and 5 Myrtle Street; 53.58261°N 2.44205°W		c. 1840	A terrace of three red brick houses with a slate roof, two storeys and seven bays. The doorways have architraves with panelled pilasters, a frieze and a fanlight, and the windows are replacements with wedge lintels and stone sills.	II
2 Hugh Lupus Street; 53.60559°N 2.42225°W		c. 1840	A stone house with a slate roof, it has two storeys, and four bays. Above the door is a fanlight, and the windows are replacements with wedge lintels.	II
3–31 Hugh Lupus Street; 53.60601°N 2.42253°W		c. 1840	A terrace of 15 stone houses with moulded eaves, slate roofs, two storeys, and a double-depth plan. Most houses have two bays, and the doorways have stone architraves. Some original sash windows remain, but many have been renewed.	II
18–28 Hugh Lupus Street; 53.60620°N 2.42225°W		c. 1840	A terrace of eight stone houses with slate roofs, two storeys, and a double-depth plan. Most houses have one bay, and the doorways have moulded stone architraves. Some original sash windows remain, but most have been renewed.	II
21–27 Chorley Old Road; 53.58263°N 2.44178°W		c. 1840	A terrace of four red brick houses with stone dressings, two storeys, sill bands, sash windows, and a slate roof. Nos. 21 and 23 have two bays each, round-headed windows with engaged columns in architraves, and bay windows. Nos. 25 and 27 have three bays each, and doorways with flat heads, architraves with panelled pilasters and a frieze, and rectangular fanlights.	II
31 Ramsay Street; 53.60354°N 2.43264°W	—	c. 1840	A stone house with a slate roof, two storeys and two bays. The doorway on the right has a round-arched architrave, the windows are replacements, that on the ground floor having a wedge lintel, and to the left is a window in a blocked doorway.	II
34 All Saints Street; 53.58276°N 2.42778°W		c. 1840	A house, later an office, in stone with a slate roof, it has two storeys with a basement and two bays. Steps lead up to a doorway with a hood mould in the left bay, and the windows are mullioned with hood moulds.	II
41 and 42 Junction Road; 53.56787°N 2.46502°W		c. 1840	Originally a school, later two houses, it is in stone with a slate roof. There are two storeys and five bays, and an embattled parapet. At the left end is a two-storey porch, and at the right end is a gabled porch with finials. The windows are mullioned with pointed lights and hood moulds.	II
71 Bradshawgate; 53.57759°N 2.42615°W		c. 1840	A brick shop with a slate roof, three storeys and three bays. On the ground floor is an archway to the right, and a late 19th-century shop front with ornate panelled pilasters, a fascia with painted glass lettering, and stained glass in the upper part of the window. On the upper floors are sash windows.	II
97 and 99 Chorley Street; 53.58130°N 2.43921°W		c. 1840	A pair of houses, later offices, in rendered brick with a slate roof. They have two storeys and two parallel gables. On the street front are three bays, and a central doorway with a moulded doorcase and a steep open pediment. The windows are mullioned.	II
237–243 Ashworth Lane; 53.60549°N 2.42261°W		c. 1840	A terrace of four stone houses with a hipped slate roof, and two storeys. Each house has one bay, and contains a doorway with a plain architrave, and renewed windows with wedge lintels.	II
245, 247 and 249 Ashworth Lane; 53.60549°N 2.42214°W		c. 1840	A terrace of three stone houses with a hipped slate roof, two storeys, and a double-depth plan. Each house has one bay, and contains a doorway with a moulded stone architrave, and renewed windows with wedge lintels.	II
253 Ashworth Lane; 53.60567°N 2.42131°W		c. 1840	Originally a farmhouse, later a private house, it is in stone with a sill band, a slate roof, two storeys, and three bays. The doorway has a round-arched architrave and a fanlight, and the windows are sashes.	II
367 Blackburn Road and 11A Eckersley Road; 53.59571°N 2.43224°W		c. 1840	Two stone houses in Gothic style, stuccoed on the Blackburn Road front, with rusticated corner pilasters, two storeys, and a hipped slate roof. The two fronts are identical. In the centre of each is a doorway that has a Tuscan doorcase with a pediment and a traceried fanlight. The windows have triangular heads, mullions, and two lights.	II
653–661 Blackburn Road; 53.60364°N 2.43250°W		c. 1840	A row of four stone houses with a slate roof, hipped on the left. There are two storeys and five bays. Each house has a round-headed doorway with imposts and a keystone. The windows are replacements with wedge lintels.	II
733 Blackburn Road; 53.60598°N 2.43177°W		c. 1840	A stone house with a slate roof, two storeys and two bays. In the centre is a two-storey porch that has a doorway and a gable with scalloped bargeboards. The windows are replacements in architraves and with hood moulds.	II
Bank Top United Reformed Church; 53.60525°N 2.42283°W		c. 1840	This originated possibly as a row of cottages, and was used later as a school, and converted into a chapel in 1926. It is in stone with a slate roof. The gable end faces the street and contains a central entrance. Along the sides are five bays, and the windows are replacements in plain stone architraves.	II
Park House; 53.59902°N 2.45534°W		c. 1840	The house possibly incorporates part of an earlier building, and does incorporate adjoining outbuildings. It is in brick with some rendered stone, and has slate roofs. The house has two storeys, a main range of two bays, a rear wing, and a parallel rear range. The windows are mullioned.	II
Railings and gates, St Mary's Church; 53.56820°N 2.46425°W		c. 1840	The wall enclosing the churchyard is in stone with raking coping. On the wall are cast iron railings with spear heads, and the gate piers have pyramidal caps. The main and side gates are ornate and are in cast iron.	II
9, 10 and 11 Playfair Street; 53.61229°N 2.42899°W		c. 1840–1850	A row of three stone houses with a slate roof, two storeys, one bay each, and a double-depth plan. They have doorways with plain architraves, replacement windows, and at the rear are integral stone walls enclosing the yards.	II
Colliers Row School; 53.60807°N 2.47907°W		1841	Originally a school, extended in 1885 and 1898, and later a private house, it is in stone with a Welsh slate roof, it has a single storey, and is in Tudor Revival style. In the centre is a gabled porch that is flanked by arched doorways, and the windows are mullioned and transomed. The gables are coped with finials.	II
Sharples Hall Farmhouse; 53.60739°N 2.42937°W	—	1843	A farmhouse, later a private house, in stone with a slate roof that has a coped gable and a corbelled gable. There are two storeys, four bays, and a rear wing. On the front are two doorways with chamfered architraves, mullioned and transomed windows on the ground floor, and mullioned windows above. In the rear wing is an oriel window, mullioned windows, a gabled dormer, and a verandah.	II
Former New Jerusalem Church; 53.58300°N 2.42917°W		1844	The church, later a warehouse, is in brick with a slate roof. The front facing the street is pedimented with a datestone, and contains a central doorway in a Tuscan architrave. The windows are round-headed.	II
St Stephen and All Martyrs' Church; 53.57221°N 2.40507°W		1844–1846	The church was designed by Edmund Sharpe, and is built in terracotta with a slate roof. It originally had a west steeple, but the spire was removed in 1939 and most of the tower in 1966. The church consists of a nave with the base of the tower forming a west porch, north and south transepts, a shallow chancel, and a vestry. Along the sides of the nave are buttresses surmounted by finials, and the window tracery is in Decorated style.	II*
Former Public Baths; 53.57494°N 2.42154°W		1845	Built as public baths and an assembly room, later used as offices, the building is in stone with a plain cornice, a blocking course, angle quoins, and slate roofs. The front has two storeys and five bays. The outer bays project and contain round-arched doorways in Tuscan architraves. The ground floor of the central three bays is recessed and at the front are five Tuscan columns, with a central doorway and fanlight behind. On the upper floor is a central three-light window in an architrave with an entablature hood. The other windows are sashes in architraves.	II
Grecian Mills; 53.56704°N 2.42934°W		1845	A former cotton spinning and doubling mill, it was extended in phases up to about 1920. The mill has five storeys with basements, and an L-shaped plan. The original part, the rear range, has sides of twelve and five bays, and the eastern range has sides of eleven and five bays. The north wing, the latest phase, has sides of six and two bays, towers at the outer corners and Art Nouveau detailing. There are a number of other buildings, including an engine house, a boiler house, a warehouse and workshop, and a range including an octagonal chimney.	II
Barrowdean House; 53.59936°N 2.47151°W		1846	This was built as the village institute, and has since been divided into residential units. It is in ashlar stone, with a moulded cornice, two storeys and eleven bays. At the ends are pedimented shallow wings. The upper floor contains round-arched windows, and on the ground floor are flat-heated windows, some of which have been converted into doorways, all with moulded architraves.	II
Albert Row: Nos. 1–11 St Paul's Place; 53.59560°N 2.44787°W		1847	A row of six stone houses with a slate roof, originally twelve back-to-back houses. There are two storeys and each house has two bays. The doorways and the windows have architraves with four-centred arched heads and hood moulds; the windows are sashes and the doors have fanlights.	II
St George's Day Centre; 53.58292°N 2.43150°W		1847	Originally a school, later used for other purposes, it is in stone with a slate roof, and is in Jacobean style. There are two storeys with an attic, and a shaped gable with finials. In the centre is a segmental-arched doorway in an architrave with an entablature, above which is an oriel window with a parapet. The windows are mullioned and transomed, and in the gable is an inscribed plaque. To the left is a lower three-storey extension with mullioned windows on each floor.	II
St Paul's Church, Halliwell; 53.59554°N 2.44760°W		1847	The church is in ashlar stone with a steep slate roof, and is in Early English style. It consists of a nave with a west porch, and a shallow chancel with north and south vestries. On the west gable is a bellcote. The porch has a moulded arched doorway, and above it is a clock face. The windows are lancets, and at the east end is a triple stepped lancet.	II
St Paul's School (south of church); 53.59535°N 2.44716°W		1847	Originally a boys' school, later used for other purposes, it is in ashlar stone with a hipped slate roof. There are two storeys and three bays, and a two-bay extension to the right. In the centre is a porch that has a four-centred arch, and this is flanked by tall windows with four-centred arched heads and hood moulds. The windows are sashes. Above the porch the blind window space carries an inscription, and on the gable is a bellcote.	II
Victoria Row: Nos. 2–16 St Paul's Place; 53.59550°N 2.44731°W		1847	A row of eight stone houses with a slate roof, originally 17 back-to-back houses and a vicarage. There are two storeys and each house has two bays. The doorways and the windows have architraves with four-centred arched heads and hood moulds; the windows are sashes. The former vicarage has two-storey canted bay windows flanking the central doorway.	II
Boundary wall, gates and railings, Victoria Row; 53.59534°N 2.44744°W		c. 1847	Facing the street are stone walls with round-arched copings and two decorative cast iron gates. Along the front of the houses is a shallow moulded plinth with decorative railings.	II
Boundary wall, railings and gates, Albert Row; 53.59546°N 2.44786°W		c. 1847	Facing the street are stone walls with round-arched copings and two decorative cast iron gates. Along the front of the houses is a shallow moulded plinth with decorative railings.	II
Boundary wall, St Paul's School (south of church); 53.59526°N 2.44712°W		c. 1847	The wall forms the boundary at the front of the school. It is in stone with round-arched copings.	II
Burnden Viaduct; 53.57011°N 2.41488°W		1848	The oldest parts of the railway viaduct, which is now disused, are the piers built by the Manchester and Leeds Railway, and the spans were built in 1881–82 by the Lancashire and Yorkshire Railway. There are six wrought iron spans, and the piers are in limestone.	II
Darcy Lever Viaduct; 53.57074°N 2.40522°W		1848	The viaduct was built to carry the railway over the valley of the River Tonge. The oldest parts of the viaduct, which is now disused, are the piers built by the Manchester and Leeds Railway, and the spans were built in 1881–82 by the Lancashire and Yorkshire Railway. There are eight wrought iron spans, and the piers are in limestone.	II
St Paul's Church, Astley Bridge; 53.59969°N 2.43137°W		1848	Aisles were added to the church in 1868. The church is in stone with slate roofs, and consists of a nave with a clerestory, north and south aisles, a chapel with a north chapel and a south vestry, and a west steeple. The body of the church is in Norman style, and the steeple and aisles are Early English. The steeple has a four-stage tower with a west doorway, clock faces, and a broach spire with lucarnes. Inside the church is a west gallery.	II
10 and 12 Wood Street; 53.57852°N 2.42616°W		1849	Originally Bolton Saving Bank, later used for other purposes, it is in ashlar stone with quoins, a modillioned cornice, and a slate roof. There are two storeys, the ground floor is rusticated, and five bays. Steps lead up to doorways in the outer bays, and between are three windows; all have stressed voussoir heads. On the upper floor are sash windows in round-headed architraves with imposts and keystones. The building is flanked by lower two-story pavilions with stepped parapets and ball finials.	II
Swan Hotel; 53.57952°N 2.42667°W		1849	The hotel, on a corner site, is in brick with a slate roof, it has three storeys, and was built in three phases. The earliest part, facing Churchgate, is symmetrical with three bays, and has a central doorway with a Tuscan porch flanked by full-height bow windows. The second phase runs for six bays along Bradshawgate, and contains a segmental archway to a courtyard above which is a Palladian window, a doorway in a moulded architrave, and an inserted public house. The latest phase, to the left of the original phase, has two bays, and contains two-storey canted bay windows, those on the upper storey having elaborate pediments. At the top is a pedimented gable containing decoration in low relief. Most of the windows are sashes.	II
Haywood House; 53.56606°N 2.43872°W	—	Mid-19th century	A house, later offices, in brown brick with a stone string course, a moulded eaves cornice, a blocking course, and a hipped slate roof. There are two storeys and five bays, the central bay projecting. On the front is a Doric portico and sash windows with segmental heads. On the upper floor are top-hung casement windows, the central one with a moulded architrave.	II
1–9 Birley Street; 53.59977°N 2.43236°W		c. 1850	A terrace of five sandstone houses with a slate roof, two storeys, and a double-depth plan. Each house has one bay, with a doorway in a plain architrave with a rectangular fanlight to the left, and renewed windows with wedge lintels.	II
2–18 Birley Street; 53.59960°N 2.43246°W		c. 1850	A terrace of eight houses and a shop in stone with a slate roof, two storeys, and a double-depth plan. The houses have one bay each, and the shop has two. The houses have round-arched moulded architraves with fanlights, and the windows are renewals with wedge lintels.	II
Bolton Sea Cadets; 53.57697°N 2.41404°W	—	c. 1850	Originally a vicarage, later used for other purposes, the building is in brick with a stuccoed band and a hipped slate roof. It has a front of three bays, and four on the sides. In the centre of the front is a Doric porch flanked by canted bay windows. The upper floor contains sash windows, there are single-storey extensions to the east, and a stair tower to the west.	II
Stork Tavern; 53.59589°N 2.44924°W		c. 1850	The public house is in stone with a slate roof, two storeys, two bays, and a double-depth plan. The central doorway has a moulded architrave and a fanlight, and the windows are sashes in architraves.	II
1–7 Playfair Street; 53.61243°N 2.42884°W		c. 1850–1860	A terrace of seven stone houses with slate roofs, two storeys, one bay each, and a double depth plan. The doorways have plain architraves, and the windows are replacements with wedge lintels. At the rear are integral stone walls enclosing the yards.	II
1–10 and 13–18 Park View and 11 and 12 Back Park View; 53.61269°N 2.42964°W		c. 1850–1860	Eighteen terraced stone houses in two ranges, forming an L-shaped plan. The end houses have three storeys, the other have two, they have one bay each, and a double-depth plan. The doorways have plain architraves, most of the windows are replacements, some are original sashes, and all have wedge lintels. The end houses have stone canopies over the doorways, and round-headed attic windows.	II
19–28 and 30–36 Park View; 53.61199°N 2.42945°W		c. 1850–1860	A terrace of 17 stone houses with quoins and slate roofs, and a double-depth plan. Most houses have two storeys, the end and middle houses have three storeys, and each house has one bay other than No. 19 which has three. The doorways have plain architraves, most of the windows are replacements, some are original sashes, and all have wedge lintels. Nos. 19 and 25 have porches. At the rear are integral stone walls enclosing the yards.	II
Church of St Michael with St Bartholomew; 53.55988°N 2.40748°W		1851	The church is in Early English style, it is built in stone, and has slate roofs with coped gables. The church consists of a nave, north and south porches, a chancel, and a north vestry. There is an elaborate double bellcote on the west gable. The windows are lancets, and at the east end is a triple lancet.	II
National Westminster Bank; 53.57979°N 2.42793°W		1852	Originally the Bank of Bolton, it was extended in 1907. The bank is in ashlar stone with brick at the rear, and is in the style of a palazzo. There are three storeys, eight bays, a curved bay on the corner, and four bays on the right return. On the ground floor are rusticated pilasters, and the middle floor is arcaded with engaged pilasters, an entablature with a modillion cornice, and round-headed windows with moulded keystones. The windows on the top floor have architraves and between them are scrolled and panelled pilasters. At the top of the bank is a modillion cornice, a balustraded parapet with urn finials, and a central two-bay pediment surmounted by a coat of arms and figures.	II
121 Radcliffe Road; 53.57652°N 2.41338°W		1854	The house originated as a park keeper's lodge, and is in rendered stone. It is in a single storey with two gabled bays and a recessed wing to the left. Between the gables is a porch with a four-centred arch flanked by two-light mullioned windows with ogee heads. In the left able is a coat of arms, and in the right gable is a trefoiled panel. In the wing are two windows, one mullioned with a small gable above. All the gables are coped with finials.	II
Market Hall and ground-floor shops 53.58055°N 2.42969°W		1854	The building is in ashlar stone with an internal cast iron structure, and has a glazed roof over the market and slate roofs over the shops. The main entrance in Knowsley Street has a portico with four giant composite columns and two square piers carrying an entablature. This is flanked by shop fronts above which are nine-bay arcades, and at the ends are three-bay pavilions. The interior has a cruciform aisled plan with ornate cast iron columns.	II
St James' Church, Breightmet; 53.58210°N 2.39291°W		1855–56	The church is in stone with slate roofs, and consists of a nave with a clerestory, north and south aisles, a chancel, a northeast vestry, and a west steeple. The steeple has a three-stage tower, buttresses, a corbel table and a broach spire with lucarnes and a weathervane.	II
St Paul's School (north of church); 53.59563°N 2.44816°W		1856	Originally a girls' school, later used for other purposes, it is in ashlar stone with a hipped slate roof. There are two storeys and three bays. In the centre is a porch that has a four-centred arch, and the windows have similar arches and hood moulds. Above the porch is an inscribed panel.	II
Boundary wall, St Paul's School (north of church); 53.59553°N 2.44809°W		c. 1856	The wall encloses the school yard on its south and east sides. It is in stone and has round-arched copings.	II
Gilnow Mill; 53.57600°N 2.44771°W		1857	A former cotton mill in brick on a stone plinth with slate roofs, and an internal structure of cast iron, brick and timber. The spinning block has four storeys, a stair tower, and an engine house, and in front is a two-storey office, warehouse and workshop range. Behind this are single-storey weaving sheds, and also on the site are a boiler house, a chimney, and a gatehouse.	II
The Brooklyn; 53.55915°N 2.42343°W		1859	Originally a house, later a public house, now a school, it is in Gothic style. The building is in brick with stone dressings and a slate roof, two storeys and an irregular plan. Its features include gables, one with a fretted bargeboard, gabled porches, and a tower with an embattled parapet and a pyramidal roof. The windows are of varying types; some are mullioned, some are mullioned and transomed, there are bay windows, French windows, an oriel window, and gabled dormers.	II
Former gatehouse to The Brooklyn; 53.55949°N 2.42276°W		c. 1859	Originally a lodge, later a private house, it is in brick with a slate roof. The house has one storey and a cruciform plan. The front facing the street is gabled, and there is a gabled porch on the left front. The windows are mullioned.	II
Gate piers to The Brooklyn; 53.55959°N 2.42312°W		c. 1859	The gate piers at the entry to the drive are in stone and have a square plan, decorative panels, and projecting caps. On the caps are cast iron lamp bases with acanthus decoration.	II
St Patrick's Church and presbytery 53.57645°N 2.42735°W		1861	A Roman Catholic church in stone with a slate roof. It consists of a nave, a north aisle, and a southwest steeple. The steeple has a two-stage tower, a south doorway with a statue in a niche above, and a spire with an octagonal base and a copper spire. At the west end is a rose window, and the other windows are lancets. The presbytery to the east is in Gothic style, in stone and brick with a slate roof.	II
Statue of Samuel Crompton; 53.57777°N 2.42658°W		1862	The statue by William Calder Marshall commemorates Samuel Crompton, inventor of the spinning mule. It consists of a bronze statue showing Crompton seated, and is placed on a plinth of polished granite. On the plinth are inscriptions, and bronze panels in low relief depicting his home at Hall i' th' Wood, and the spinning mule.	II
Church of St Andrew and St George; 53.58165°N 2.43136°W		1862–63	Originally a Congregational church, later United Reformed, it is in stone with slate roofs, and is in Gothic style. The church is built over a basement containing school rooms. There is a tower at the northeast corner, originally with a spire, but this was demolished in 1969. Inside the church is a horseshoe-shaped gallery on three sides.	II
St Paul's Church, wall, railings and gate 53.57830°N 2.43525°W		1862–1865	The church is in stone with a slate roof, and consists of a nave with a clerestory, north and south aisles, north and south transepts, a chancel with north and south vestries, and a northeast steeple. The steeple has a tower with clasping buttresses, corner pinnacles, and a broach spire with lucarnes. Against the east wall of the south transept is an octagonal stair tower. Surrounding the churchyard is a stone wall with cast iron railings, a gate and an overthrow.	II
Chimney at junction with Moss Lane; 53.59792°N 2.46318°W		1863	The chimney is all that remains of a former bleach works. It is in brick, octagonal, tapering, and with a moulded cap. It is 30 feet (9.1 m) across at the base, and was originally 306 feet (93 m) tall.	II
28 Mawdsley Street; 53.57719°N 2.42808°W		1865	An office building in brick with a projecting modillion eaves cornice and a slate roof, two storeys and seven bays. The central doorway has an architrave with polished granite shafts, a segmental arch with voussoirs, and an entablature hood with a shallow pediment. Between the storeys is a modillion cornice, and the windows have segmental arches with voussoirs.	II
Mawdsley Hall; 53.57804°N 2.42861°W		1865	The building, which contains shops and offices, is in stone with a slate roof, and is in Italianate palazzo style. There are three storeys, four bays on Mawdsley Street, and ten on Exchange Street. The ground floor is arcaded with rusticated pilasters and flat arches. The upper floors have pilasters between bays, and segmental-headed windows. In the centre is a polished granite shaft with a foliated capital.	II
Hulton Memorial; 53.56821°N 2.46488°W		Mid to late 19th century	The memorial to members of the Hulton family is in the churchyard of St Mary the Virgin's Church, Deane. It is in stone, and consists of an octagonal plinth on steps, with moulded panels and an embattled parapet. An octagonal tapering shaft surmounted by a cross stands on the plinth, which also carries inscribed slate tablets.	II
Former entrance lodge, Queen's Park; 53.57744°N 2.44488°W		c. 1866	The lodge is in stone with a slate roof, two storeys, and an L-shaped plan. In the angle is a porch with a hipped roof. The windows are mullioned, and in both wings is a dormer with a half-hipped roof, and a canted bay window.	II
Town Hall; 53.57812°N 2.43080°W		1866–1873	The town hall, which was extended in 1938, is in ashlar stone, with a basement, and is in Neoclassical style. It has a square plan with offices forming an outer ring. The front has a basement and two tall floors, and above the entrance is a central tower. Steps lead up to a central portico with five bays, six Composite columns, and a pediment containing a sculpture. The portico is flanked on both sides by five bays separated by Composite columns, and with a balustrade, and above the central bays are pedimented towers. The main tower is in Baroque style and has a rusticated base, an upper stage with Composite pilasters and a balustrade, and a top stage containing a clock face that is surmounted by a dome with an elaborate flèche.	II*
St Peter's Church; 53.57938°N 2.42365°W		1867–1871	The church replaced an earlier church on the site, and was designed by E. G. Paley. It is in stone with slate roofs, and consists of a nave with a clerestory, north and south aisles, transepts, a chancel with north and south chapels, and a west tower. The tower has four stages, a west door with a moulded arch and granite shafts, and clasping buttresses rising to crocketed finials.	II*
Thornleigh House; 53.60194°N 2.44283°W		1868	A large house that was extended in about 1890 and later used for other purposes, it is in brick with stone dressings and a slate roof. It is mainly in two storeys, and has a porch that has an arched entrance with decorative spandrels, and above it is a balustraded parapet. Some of the windows are mullioned and transomed, others are sashes. Other features include gables, bay windows, and more balustraded parapets, and inside the house are inglenooks.	II
Former County Court; 53.57786°N 2.42851°W		1869–70	The former county court was later used for other purposes. It is in stone with a rusticated ground floor, a slate roof, and brick at the rear. There are two storeys and ten bays. On the ground floor are two round-headed doorways and windows with flat heads; all have foliated keystones with the initials "VR". On the upper floor the windows have round heads, engaged shafts with Corinthian capitals, moulded arches, and balustrades.	II
All Saints Church; 53.58192°N 2.42710°W		1869–1871	The church was designed by G. E. Street in Early English style, and is in stone with a Welsh slate roof. It consists of a nave with a clerestory, north and south aisles, a west porch, and a chancel. Towards the west end of the nave is a bellcote with a pyramidal roof.	II
24 and 26 Mawdsley Street; 53.57732°N 2.42815°W		c. 1870	A pair of brick office buildings in Italianate style. They have string courses between the storeys, a projecting modillion eaves cornice, and a slate roof. There are three storeys and a symmetrical front of five bays, and in the centre is a segmental archway flanked by doorways. The doorways and windows have arched architraves.	II
25 and 27 Mawdsley Street, wall and railings 53.57700°N 2.42773°W		c. 1870	Originally a club, later used for other purposes, it is in red brick with dressings in blue brick and stone, a slate roof, and is in Venetian Gothic style. There are two storeys with basements, and blocks of four and five bays. The left block has a doorway to the left and arcaded windows, those on the upper floor with trefoil heads. The right block is symmetrical with gablets in the outer bays and a central doorway. The windows on the ground floor have flat heads, and above they are paired. In front of the basement area is a chamfered wall with cast iron railings.	II
Sharples Hall; 53.61081°N 2.42655°W		c. 1870	A large house, extended in about 1980, and divided into different units. It is in stone, partly rusticated, with a modillion cornice, bands, and a slate roof. It has two storeys, a partial basement, an attic, and a square plan with three-bay sides. The west front, originally the entrance front, has a projecting pedimented bay with a porch, and a round-headed doorway, now a window. Elsewhere there are bay windows, and the other windows are replacements in moulded architraves.	II
Steps and balustrade, Thornleigh House; 53.60168°N 2.44241°W	—	c. 1870	The terrace of the garden runs to the south and the east of the house. The walls are in brick and carry a stone balustrade with ball finials. On both sides there are flights of steps.	II
Chadwick statue 53.57795°N 2.42988°W		1873	The statue by Charles Bell Birch commemorates Samuel Taylor Chadwick, a doctor who practised locally. It consists of a bronze figure standing on a stone plinth. On the plinth is a bronze table depicting in low relief a seated woman with poor children.	II
Coach House Restaurant; 53.60355°N 2.45622°W		1874–1878	Originally the coach house, stables and coachman's cottage for Smithills Hall, and later used for other purposes, it is in stone with some timber framing to the gables and a stone-flagged roof. It has an irregular plan arranged around a courtyard. At the entrance is a four-centred archway with a clock in the gable and a cupola on the roof. The windows are mullioned. In the southwest corner is the coachman's cottage that has a jettied upper floor and a quatrefoil band.	II
Royal Bank of Scotland; 53.57980°N 2.42932°W		1875	The bank, on a corner site, is in ashlar stone on a rusticated plinth with a slate roof, and is in Renaissance style. It has three storeys, seven bays on Deansgate and eight on Market Street. The entrance on Deansgate is flanked by pairs of polished granite columns, and on the middle floor are round-headed windows, also flanked by polished granite columns, and a balustrade with ball finials. The right two bays project forward and are surmounted by a tower, and there is another tower on the Market Street front. At the top of the building is a modillion eaves cornice, a balustrade and pediments with finials, including one above the corner canted bay.	II
St Thomas' Church; 53.59255°N 2.44268°W		1875	The church was designed by Paley and Austin, and is in brick with some stone dressings and a green slate roof. It consists of a nave with a clerestory, north and south aisles, north and south porches, a south transept containing a vestry, and a chancel. On the south transept is a bellcote with a pyramidal roof. Most of the windows are lancets, and in the west front are two rose windows.	II*
Castle Street Police Station; 53.57822°N 2.41825°W		1876	A combined law court and police station in red brick with stone dressings, a dentilled band, a modillion eaves cornice, and a hipped and gabled slate roof. There are two storeys and three blocks in a J-shaped plan. It has a front of eleven bays, the outer bays and the central gabled bay protecting forward. The windows in the central bay have quoined surrounds, and between the storeys is an inscribed tablet. The main entrance has a stone surround incorporating a coat of arms, some windows are mullioned and transomed, and others are casements.	II
Woodside; 53.57940°N 2.47778°W		1877	Originally a large house, later a school, it is in stone with a Westmorland slate roof, and in Gothic style. The building has two storeys with attics and a basement, and an irregular plan. Its features include a tower with gargoyles, a mansard roof and wrought iron brattishing, windows that are mullioned or mullioned and transomed, oriel windows, lancet windows, and gables with ornamental bargeboards.	II
Church of All Souls; 53.59372°N 2.43392°W		1878–1881	The church was designed by Paley and Austin, it is now redundant and is under the care of the Churches Conservation Trust. It is built in brick with stone dressings and a slate roof. The church consists of a nave, a north porch, a chancel with a canted apse, and a west tower. The tower has four stages, a west doorway, a traceried parapet with crocketed pinnacles at the corners, and a semi-octagonal stair turret on the north side. At the east end of the nave are octagonal pinnacles with two stages of arcading and a crocketed top.	II*
Former lodge to Watermillock; 53.59861°N 2.42548°W		1880	The lodge was designed by Bradshaw and Gass. It is in stone with green slate roofs, and has 1 1/2 storeys and a rear extension giving a T-shaped plan. On the front is a two-bay loggia that has segmental arches with foliate capitals and spandrels and a coped parapet. Above it is a gabled dormer with a finial. The right bay is occupied by the curved end of the wing, it contains mullioned windows on each floor, and is surmounted by a conical roof with a finial.	II
Former All Soul's School; 53.59383°N 2.43320°W	—	c. 1880	The former school is in brick with a slate roof, and consists of two blocks at right angles with a porch in the angle. The block parallel to the street has one storey and contains four windows with a continuous hood mould and a moulded stone parapet. In the porch is a moulded doorway with a fanlight. The other range has two storeys and five bays. On the entrance front are two arched windows, and along the sides are arched windows on the ground floor and flat-headed windows above. All the windows are mullioned and transomed.	II
Watermillock; 53.59932°N 2.42471°W		1880–1886	Originally a country house by Bradshaw and Gass in Tudor style, and later used for other purposes, it is in stone with York stone dressings and a Welsh slate roof. It has two storeys with attics, and fronts of three bays. In the centre of the entrance front is a projecting porch with a pointed arch, and a parapet with griffins as corner pinnacles. In the right bay is a two-storey canted bay window, and the windows are mullioned and transomed. The bays are gabled; in the left gable is a gabled dormer, and the other gables contain windows in arched recesses.	II
Chapel, Astley Bridge Cemetery; 53.59821°N 2.43792°W		1883	The chapel is in sandstone on a chamfered plinth, and has a slate roof with coped gables. It is in Decorated style, and has an L-shaped plan.	II
Church of St Augustine of Canterbury; 53.58869°N 2.41060°W		1883–1886	Designed by R. Knill Freeman in free Decorated style, the church is in red sandstone with a slate roof. It consists of a nave with a clerestory, north and south aisles, a northwest full-height porch and baptistry, a chancel with a north organ loft, and a basement containing a vestry.	II
Statue of Disraeli; 53.57928°N 2.44544°W		1887	The statue of Benjamin Disraeli is in Queen's Park. It is in sandstone and consists of a standing figure in the robes of the Order of the Garter on a high plinth.	II
Prudential Building; 53.57753°N 2.42642°W		1889	Built by the Prudential Assurance Society on a corner site, and later occupied by other tenants, it is in brick and terracotta and has a slate roof. There are three storeys, three bays in Bradshawgate, and two on Nelson Square. In the corner bay is a two-storey canted oriel window rising to a turret, with mullioned and transomed windows on the lower storey and panels below. There is another two-storey oriel window on the Bradshawgate front. The windows on the middle floor are mullioned and transomed, and on the top floor they are mullioned.	II
Gate piers, Mere Hall; 53.58627°N 2.43930°W		1890	The gate piers at the entrance to the drive are in stone with polished granite dressings and bronze tablets. The piers are chamfered with recessed traceried panels and chamfered pyramidal caps. The piers carry inscriptions and coats of arms.	II
Bridge over St Helena Road; 53.57993°N 2.43502°W		c. 1890	The bridge carries Marsden Road (B6205) over St Helena Road. It is in stone and has a skew arch with rusticated abutments, and a plain parapet with a raised central panel.	II
Canal milestone 8¾ miles from Manchester; 53.55656°N 2.35814°W		c. 1890	The milestone is on the south side of the Manchester, Bolton and Bury Canal, and is in buff sandstone. It has a rectangular cross-section with an arched head, and is about 0.5 metres (1 ft 8 in) in height. On the front is inscribed "M" and "8¾" in incised lettering.	II
Former Turkish baths 53.57686°N 2.42697°W		1890–91	The Victorian Turkish baths closed in 1890 and have since been used for other purposes. The building is in brick with terracotta dressings, an eaves cornice, a balustraded parapet, and a hipped slate roof. There are two storeys and a symmetrical front of three bays. In the central bay is a segmentally-headed doorway that has bulbous pilasters with scrollwork in low relief and an entablature, and above it is an oriel window with an inscribed apron. The outer bays contain, on the ground floor, segmentally-headed windows with voussoirs, and on the upper floor, flat-headed windows. All the windows are mullioned and transomed.	II
Chorley Old Road Methodist Church and Hall; 53.58784°N 2.45623°W		1892	The original building is the hall, the church following in 1902. They are in brick with stone dressings and slate roofs. The front of the church is pedimented with projecting domed pavilions, and there is a larger dome over the body of the church. The porch has two round-headed doorways with a lunette between them, and above it is a balcony and a Palladian window. The church is linked to the hall at the left, which has a two-bay central block flanked by lower bays. In the central block are round-headed windows, and there are flat-headed doorways in the outer bays.	II
George Marsh Memorial; 53.56837°N 2.46433°W		1893	The memorial is in the churchyard of St Mary's Church, and commemorates the Protestant martyr George Marsh who was executed in Chester in 1555. The memorial consists of a Celtic-style wheel cross decorated with scroll work, standing on a rough boulder that carries an inscription.	II
Beehive Mills; 53.56244°N 2.41553°W		1895	Two cotton spinning mills, the second built in 1902, both demolished 2019 to make way for 121 houses. They were in red brick with bands of yellow and blue brick, and had an internal structure of cast iron, steel and concrete. No. 1 mill has five storeys and sides of 15 and four bays, and No. 2 had six storeys and sides of 13 and five bays. Both mills had stair and sprinkler towers at the southeast angles, and No. 2 has a smaller tower at the northwest angle. Joining the mills is a loading bay, and at the rear are an engine house, a boiler house, and the base of a chimney stack.	II
Former Congregational Church, Blackburn Road; 53.59159°N 2.43059°W		1895–1898	The Congregational Church, later an antiques centre, was built for William Lever. It is in red Runcorn sandstone and has slate roofs with ridge cresting, and is in Perpendicular style. It consists of a nave with an apsidal end, east and west aisles, east and west transepts, a high aisle to the south of the east transept, and a northwest steeple. The steeple has a tower with a west doorway, projecting corbels and pinnacles at the top, and is surmounted by a spire with lucarnes.	II
Christ Church; 53.58035°N 2.47638°W		1896	The church, by R. Knill Freeman in Perpendicular style, is in stone with red sandstone dressings and a Westmorland slate roof. It consists of a nave, north and south aisles, a south porch, north and south transepts, and a chancel with a two-storey south vestry. Rising from the side of the vestry is an octagonal turret with a wooden bell stage and a roof with lucarnes. The east window has seven lights.	II
Statue of J. T. Fielding; 53.57911°N 2.44586°W		1896	The statue in Queen's Park commemorates J. T. Fielding, a Trade unionist. It consists of a standing figure in sandstone on a stone plinth that carries an inscription.	II
Former Grammar School and railings 53.57661°N 2.42669°W		1896–97	The school, designed by R. Knill Freeman, has since been used for other purposes. It is in brick with terracotta dressings and a slate roof. There are three storeys and nine bays, the outer two bays on both sides projecting forward. The arched doorway in the fourth bay has decorated spandrels, and above it are four arched windows and a pierced segmental pediment. In the central bay is an oriel window, on the top floor are four Palladian window, and all the windows are mullioned and transomed. At the top are five gables with pierced parapets between them. The central gable is pedimented with a cupola, and in front of the building are cast iron railings, gates and gate piers.	II
Manse, Former Congregational Church; 53.59136°N 2.43072°W		1897	The manse, on a corner site, is in red sandstone with a slate roof and two storeys. There are two bays on Blackburn Road, and three on Hibbert Street. On the front the right bay is gabled and has a full-height canted bay window with mullioned windows. The doorway is in the Hibbert Street front, and has a pediment.	II
War Memorial Lady Chapel, Church of St Peter and St Paul; 53.57148°N 2.43403°W	—	1897	The Lady chapel of the Roman Catholic church was remodelled as a war memorial and decorated with a complete scheme of mosaics by Eric Newton in the 1920s. The decorative scheme includes geometric patterns and depictions of the Annunciation and the Crucifixion. The rest of the church is excluded from the listing.	II
Statue of James Dorrian, MD; 53.57940°N 2.44493°W		1898	The statue in Queen's Park commemorates a popular local doctor, and is by John Cassidy. It is in stone, and consists of a standing figure on a concave sandstone plinth with a laurel in relief and an inscription.	II
Victoria Hall and Victoria Buildings; 53.58072°N 2.43090°W		1898–1900	The hall is a Methodist mission hall, and this is flanked by shops. The building, designed by Bradshaw & Gass, is in red brick and terracotta with stone dressings and slate roofs. Above the canopied entrance to the hall is a three-stage tower containing an oriel window, a blind circular panel with a pediment, a triglyph frieze, a balustraded parapet, an octagonal turret, and a domed top. The tower is flanked by two bays on the left and four on the right. These contain shop fronts on the ground floor, and above are windows in architraves, those on the top floor with small wrought iron balconies.	II
Statue of Lieut. Colonel; Sir B. A. Dobson; 53.57864°N 2.43018°W		1900	The statue, by John Cassidy commemorates a former mayor of the town. It consists of a polished granite plinth with inscriptions. On the plinth is a standing figure in bronze.	II
Railings and walls to underground public conveniences 53.57783°N 2.42665°W		c. 1900	Above each set of steps in Nelson Square is a stone pier with the arms of the town in low relief. The railings are in cast iron, and are decorative, with urn finials and scroll-work.	II
Former School of Art and Design and boundary wall 53.57544°N 2.41852°W		1901	The building, by Bradshaw and Gass, is in red brick and terracotta with a slate roof, two storeys with a basement and two parallel ranges. It has a symmetrical front with stair towers and porches recessed at the ends. The porches have segmentally-headed doorways and windows, and the stair towers have bell-shaped roofs. The main block has a central canted bay window, and in the centre is a lower canted projection with a domed roof. On the upper storeys of the outer bays are windows with segmental heads, and most of the other windows are mullioned and transomed. The front area has a wall in brick and terracotta, and is interspersed by piers with ball finials, and has paired terracotta gate piers	II
13 Silverwell Street, wall and railings 53.57820°N 2.42582°W		1903	An office building in brick and terracotta with a slate roof, two storeys, a front of two bays, and five bays stretching to the rear. The right bay protrudes forward and contains a doorway with a moulded segmentally-arched architrave and a segmental pediment containing a coat of arms. The parapet has a frieze of panels over the left bay, and a segmental arch over the right bay. The windows are mullioned and transomed. In front of the office is a low wall in brick and terracotta with a concave arched parapet and cast iron railings.	II
Lych gate, St Mary's Church; 53.56823°N 2.46437°W		1903	The lych gate at the entrance to the churchyard is in stone with a slate roof. It has a four-centred arch with a hood mould springing from corbels, and a three-light window. The angles are canted, and at the top is an embattled parapet with gargoyles.	II
Swan Lane Mills Nos. 1 and 2; 53.56344°N 2.44331°W		1903	A pair of former cotton spinning mills designed by Stott and Sons, built in two phases, the second in 1906. They are in brick with a concrete roof, and internally have cast iron columns and brick arches. Both mills have five storeys and a basement, Mill No. 1 has sides of 25 and 5 bays, and No. 2 has sides of 23 and 6 bays. The windows have segmental heads, and there are stair towers on the south sides. To the northwest is a double engine house with a tower behind it, and a chimney with a swan in white brick beside it.	II*
Yates Wine Lodge; 53.57890°N 2.42699°W		1906	A public house in terracotta with a slate roof, three storeys and six bays. On the ground floor are two round-headed doorways, and there are arcades of round-headed windows on the ground and middle floors. In the centre of the top floor is an oriel window with pilasters, flanked by two oculi on each side. Above the central three bays is a segmental pedimented gable, and at the tops of the outer bays are towers with domed roofs.	II
Falcon Mill; 53.59543°N 2.44462°W		1907	A former cotton spinning mill in red brick with bands in yellow brick, and the internal construction is in steel and concrete. There are six storeys, and sides of nine and eight bays, with three flat-headed windows in each bay. In the southwest corner is a tower with terracotta dressings, a parapet, and a pavilion roof. There is a projecting block at the southeast corner, a privy tower on the northeast angle, and a two-storey extension on the east side.	II
Nos. 26–28 Bradshawgate (former Fleece Hotel); 53.57912°N 2.42705°W		1907	Originally a hotel, later a public house, it is in terracotta with a slate roof, three storeys and five bays. Above the doorway is a segmental canopy. The outer bays are gabled, and contain shallow oriel windows on the upper floors. Below the middle floor windows are cartouches and under the top floor windows are swags and aprons. In the centre at the top of the building is a shaped gable with ball finials, and the window below it has a segmental architrave with a shall motif.	II
Whitakers Department Store; 53.57936°N 2.43090°W		1907	The department store is built with re-used timber framing, and has a tiled roof. It is on a corner site, with a curved corner and a circular two-storey tower with continuous mullioned and transomed windows. This is surmounted by a bell-shaped conical roof on bracketed eaves. The shop has two storeys with attics, and two bays on each front. On the ground floor is a modern shop front, and the upper floors contain mullioned windows. Above the attics are jettied gables with finials.	II
Croal Mill; 53.57261°N 2.45272°W		1908	A former cotton mill by Bradshaw Gass & Hope in red brick with a concrete roof and an internal structure of cast iron, steel and concrete. It has six storeys and sides of ten and five bays. The mill has a projecting engine house, and there is a boundary wall with ancillary buildings. At the northeast angle is a stair tower with Byzantine details, angle pilasters, terracotta dressings, windows with segmental arches, oriel windows, and volutes below a shallow domed roof.	II
Somerset Road United Reformed Church and Sunday School; 53.58212°N 2.45879°W		c. 1910	The church and Sunday School are in dark stone with dressings in Bath stone and have red tiled roofs. The entrance front of the church has an arched door flanked by mullioned windows and above it is a five-light window. To the left on the northwest corner is an octagonal tower with an embattled parapet. The windows have Decorated tracery with Art Nouveau motifs, and inside the church is a hammerbeam roof. The attached Sunday school has an arched doorway above which is a wide three-light window, and the other windows are mullioned and transomed.	II
Spinners Hall; 53.58154°N 2.43230°W		1911	The hall is in brick with stone dressings, and is in Edwardian Baroque style. There are two and three storeys, and a front of ten bays. In the centre is a round-headed doorway with panelled pilasters, and a balustraded balcony on scrolled brackets, with mullioned and transomed windows in the flanking bays. Above the doorway is a window with a pediment, and a tower with angle pilasters, a round-headed arch with a keystone on each face, and a dome. The outer bays have segmental-pedimented heads on the ground floor, and on the upper floors are pilasters and engaged columns, over which is a segmental pediment containing a cartouche.	II
St Andrew and St George Sunday school 53.58159°N 2.43180°W		1914	The Sunday School, later used for other purposes, is in stone with a Westmorland slate roof, two storeys and ten bays. Each of the outer bays contains a doorway with a hood mould, above which is an oriel window and a stepped parapet. Between the other bays are pilasters with moulded panelled gablets at the top. The windows have segmental heads, those on the upper storey being steeper, and at the top is a panelled parapet, with a coat of arms in the centre.	II
Swan Lane Mill No. 3; 53.56440°N 2.44233°W		1914	A former cotton spinning mill by Stott and Sons, in brick with stone dressings and slate roofs, and with an internal structure of cast iron, steel and concrete. There are six storeys with double attics, and sides of 23 and 14 bays. The corners of the mill are rounded, there is a cornice above the sixth floor, and the windows have segmental heads. At the southwest corner is a tower containing a staircase that has lunette windows and angle pinnacles. At the northwest corner is a two-storey engine room with sides of three and two bays, beyond which is a chimney with a swan in white brick.	II*
Cenotaph, Nelson Square; 53.57769°N 2.42694°W		1920	The war memorial is in Portland stone, and consists of a plain stele with a wreath and inscribed bronze plaques. It commemorates the members of Bolton Artillery who served in the First World War.	II
War memorial, Bradshaw tennis club 53.60711°N 2.40397°W	—	1922	The war memorial commemorates the members of Bradshaw Cricket Club who lost their lives in the First World War. It is in Portland stone and consists of a rectangular slab with a moulded cornice and top on a stepped plinth. It is inscribed with the names of those lost, and on the ends are carvings in relief.	II
Tennis club house 53.60497°N 2.42204°W	—	1923	The club house was extended in 1935. It is built in mock timber framing and has a slate roof, one storey and three bays. The central doorway has an entablature and above it is a pedimented gable. The windows are casements, and in the centre of the roof is a cupola with a weathervane.	II
Astley Bridge Mill; 53.60598°N 2.43047°W		1925–26	The last cotton mill to be built in the town, it is by Bradshaw Gass & Hope and is in red brick with an internal structure of steel and concrete. There are five storeys with a basement, and sides of 14 and six bays. The windows are in groups of three, separated by pilasters with ornamental terracotta capitals, and at the top is a fretted parapet. At the northwest corner is a stair tower with round-arched windows, small balconies, and a domed copper roof. There are extensions of one and two storeys, and a short chimney.	II
Bolton School; 53.57981°N 2.45501°W		1928	The school is in red Runcorn sandstone with green slate roofs, and is in Tudor style. It has a symmetrical plan, with a central block flanked by quadrangles. The entrance has a four-centred arch with a clock face, flanked by octagonal towers, with a two-storey three-bay range on each side with mullioned and transomed windows and an embattled parapet. The quadrangles are in two and three storeys, and the features include gables, canted bay windows and mullioned windows.	II
Cenotaph, Queen's Park; 53.58097°N 2.44691°W		1928	The war memorial is by Bradshaw Gass & Hope, and is in white ashlar stone. It consists of a rectangular structure on a stepped plinth with a stepped moulded cornice. On the sides are coats of arms in relief, and there are panels on the base containing bronze lettered tablets.	II
Cenotaph, Victoria Square; 53.57837°N 2.42962°W		1928	The war memorial is in white ashlar stone, and consists of an arch between pilasters, with a stepped entablature. On the sides are bronze figures in high relief.	II*
Civic Centre; 53.57799°N 2.43192°W		1932–1939	A group of buildings by Bradshaw Gass & Hope including a library, a museum and art gallery, a magistrates court and a central police station, forming a symmetrical crescent. It is in ashlar gritstone and brick on a steel frame and has a Mansard roof in Westmorland slate. In the centre are three semicircular arches, flanked by crescent-shaped wings with two storeys and basements, and 13 bays. At the ends are taller entrance blocks with pilasters, Ionic columns, and steps leading up to a pedimented doorway with a moulded surround.	II
Group of four K6 telephone kiosks in front of Post Office; 53.57910°N 2.43286°W		1935	Four K6 type telephone kiosks, designed by Giles Gilbert Scott, in front of the Post Office. They are constructed in cast iron with a square plan, shallow domes, and unperforated crowns in the top panels.	II
Group of four K6 telephone kiosks outside Market Hall; 53.58047°N 2.42878°W		1935	Four K6 type telephone kiosks, designed by Giles Gilbert Scott, outside the Market Hall. They are constructed in cast iron with a square plan, shallow domes, and unperforated crowns in the top panels.	II
St Chad's Church; 53.57952°N 2.40745°W		1937	The church is in red brick on a blue brick plinth and has a copper roof. It consists of a nave with north and south aisles, a west baptistry, a tall chancel with east vestries, a south chapel, a northwest campanile, and stair towers.	II
