= Bolton Cenotaph =

War memorial in Greater Manchester, England

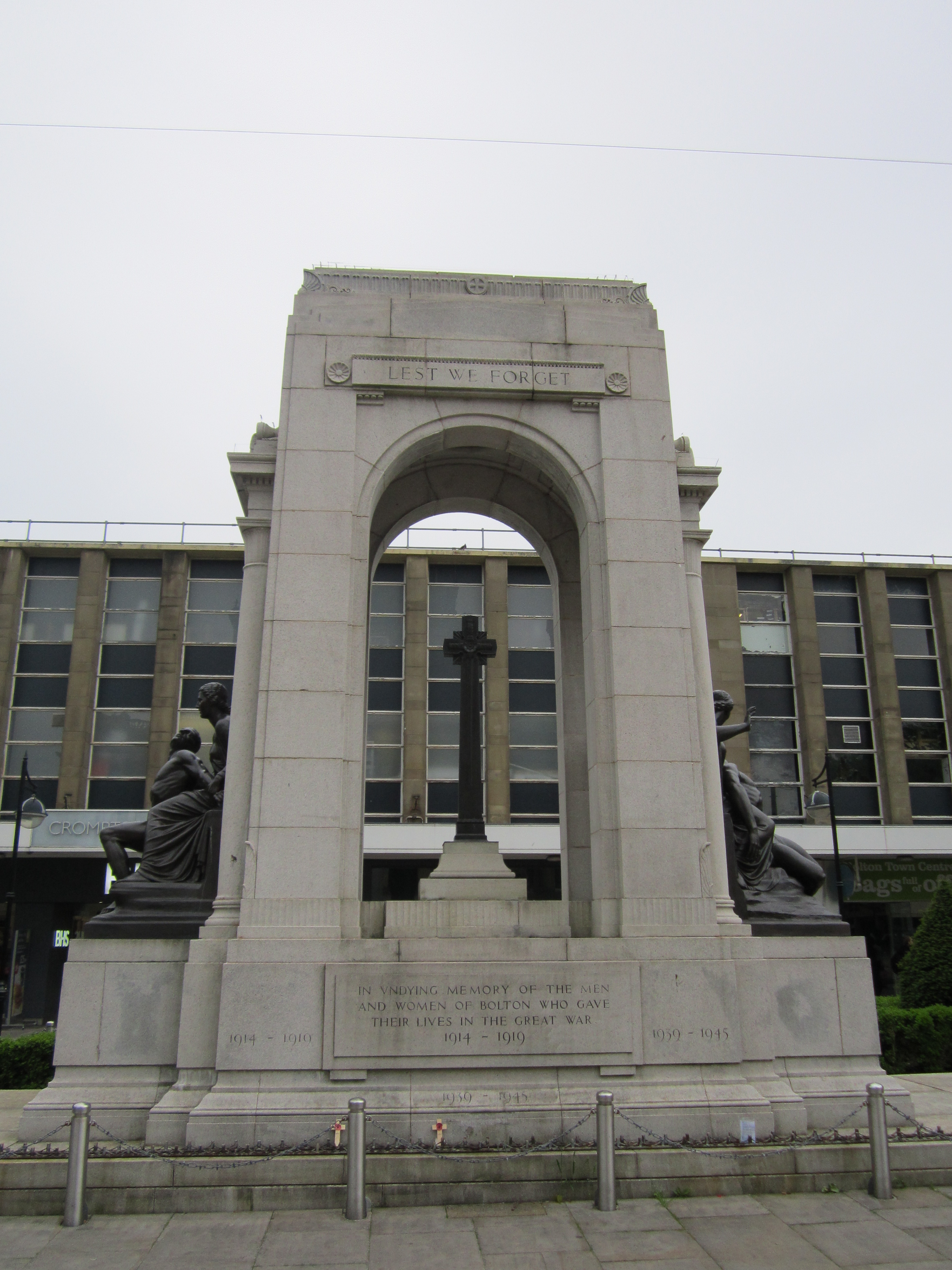
- Bolton Cenotaph in 2013

- Location within Greater Manchester

General information
- Architectural style: Neoclassical
- Location: Victoria Square, Bolton, Greater Manchester, England
- Coordinates: 53.5784°N 2.4296°W
- Year built: 1928; 98 years ago

Technical details
- Material: Kemnay granite

Design and construction
- Architect: A. J. Hope
- Other designers: Walter Marsden (1933 bronze sculptures)

Listed Building – Grade II*
- Official name: Bolton Cenotaph
- Designated: 30 April 1999
- Reference no.: 1388289

Bolton Cenotaph is a First World War memorial in Victoria Square, Bolton, Greater Manchester, England. It serves as the principal monument commemorating the men and women of Bolton who lost their lives during the war and subsequent conflicts, and it is designated a Grade II* listed building.

== History ==
The cenotaph was commissioned by the County Borough of Bolton and unveiled on 14 July 1928 as a tribute to those who died in the First World War. Additional inscriptions were added after the Second World War to honour those who died between 1939 and 1945. The memorial remains the focal point of Bolton's annual Remembrance Day ceremonies and other civic commemorations.

On 30 April 1999, Bolton Cenotaph was designated a Grade II* listed building for its architectural and historic significance. In 2023 Bolton Council restored its floodlighting to ensure the monument could be fully illuminated at night for the first time in years.

== Design and construction ==
The cenotaph was designed by A. J. Hope and constructed from Kemnay granite. It features a tall pylon in the Neoclassical style, penetrated by an arch that frames a bronze cross overlaid with an inverted crusader's sword. The structure stands on a moulded base with inset steps and is flanked by two projecting pedestals.

In 1933 bronze sculptures by Walter Marsden were installed on either side of the arch, each presenting an allegory of peace and war: Struggle portrays Peace as a seated female figure restraining a kneeling warrior, while Sacrifice depicts her raising her hands as a fallen soldier lies in her lap. The bronze work was cast by A. B. Burton of Thames Ditton, a noted art founder.

Bolton Cenotaph occupies a prominent position in Victoria Square, directly opposite the Grade II*-listed town hall.

=== Inscriptions ===
The cenotaph bears several inscriptions:

- East face: "Tell ye your children."
- Base: "Our brothers died to win a better world. Our part must be to strive for truth, goodwill and peace that their self-sacrifice be not in vain."
- West face: "Lest we forget" and "In undying memory of the men and women of Bolton who gave their lives in the Great War 1914–1919."

Dates for both World Wars (1914–1919 and 1939–1945) are also inscribed.

== Gallery ==
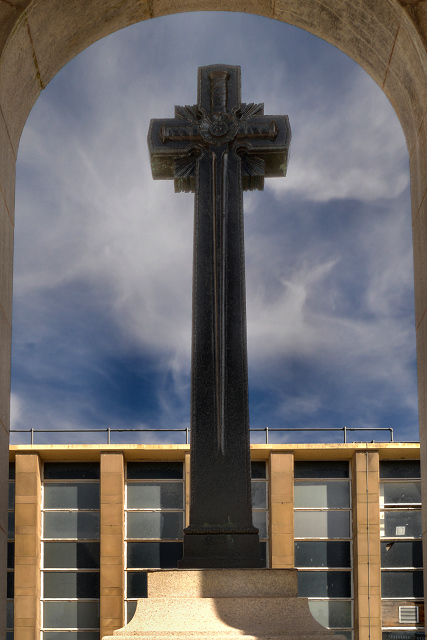
Bronze cross overlaid with sword

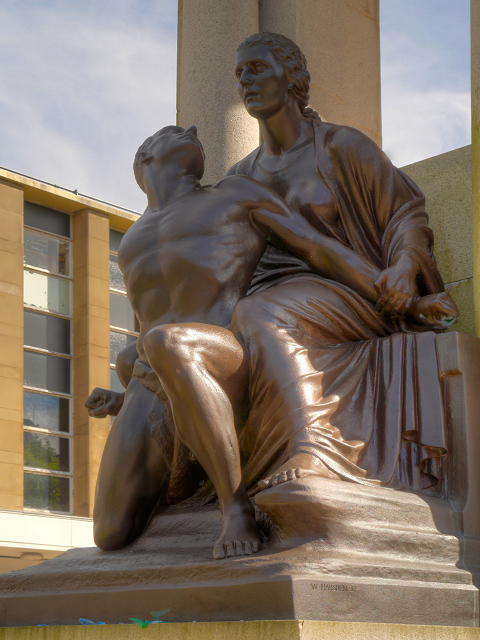
Bronze sculpture Struggle

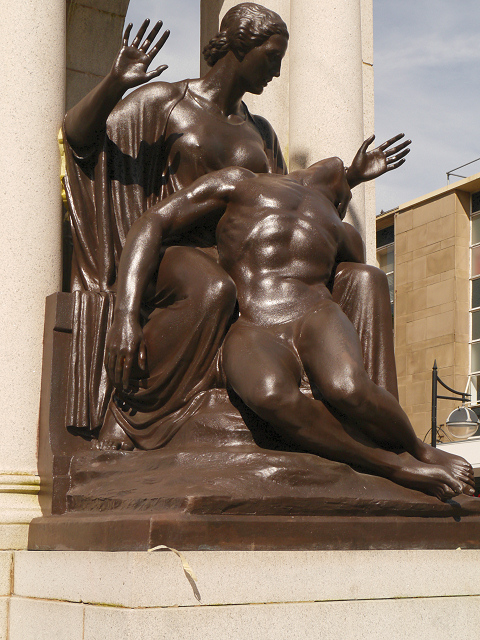
Bronze sculpture Sacrifice

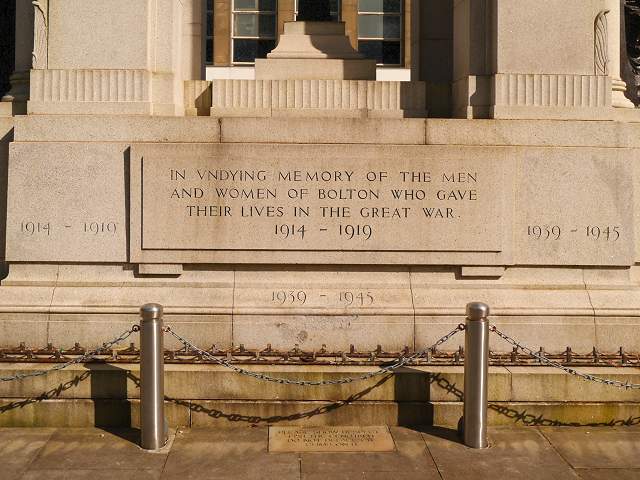
Inscriptions on the west face

== See also ==
- Grade II* listed buildings in Greater Manchester
- Listed buildings in Bolton
