= Astley Bridge Mill =

Cotton mill in Bolton, Greater Manchester, England

Coordinates: 53.6052°N 2.4313°W

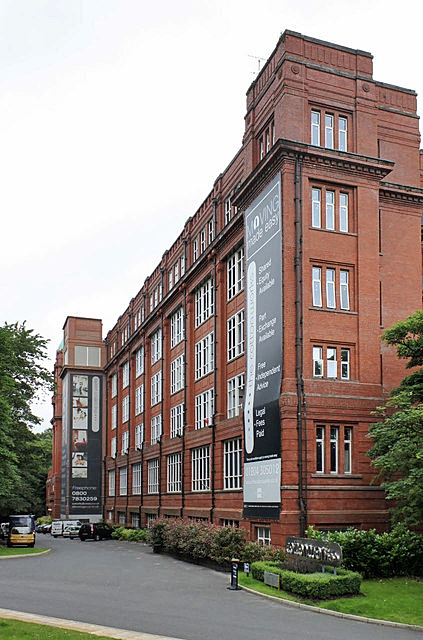
Astley Bridge Mill

Astley Bridge Mill or Holden Mill is a former cotton mill in the district of Astley Bridge in Bolton, Greater Manchester, England, which has since been converted into an apartment building. Constructed in 1926 for Sir John Holden & Sons Ltd, it was the last cotton mill to be built in Bolton and is a Grade II listed building.

== Architecture ==
Designed by the local architectural company of Bradshaw, Gass and Hope, the building has five storeys and a basement, with a typical rectangular floor plan of 14 by 6 bays and a flat concrete roof. The internal structure is made of steel and concrete, faced in brick with red terracotta detailing in a restrained Art Deco style. At one corner is a stair tower with a domed copper roof; projections at other corners carry services between floors. It was designed from the outset to use electricity from the local power station, one of the earliest mills to do so, and thus had no large boiler house and stack, although conventional heating boilers and chimneys were required for heating purposes.

== Equipment ==
Line shafts at ceiling height on each floor which operated the spinning machines were driven by individual electric motors. The end bays in upper floors were lower than the rest of the floor to allow the mounting of the motors at the appropriate height. The mill housed 125,000 mule spindles and 31,000 ring spindles.

== History ==
The building and fitting of the mill was completed in 1927, by which time its owner, Sir John Holden, 1st Baronet, had recently died. Sir John was a self-made man who was born in Bolton but lived in Leigh where he was twice Mayor of the town.

Cotton spinning at the mill came to an end in 1965, after which time it was occupied by Littlewoods Mail Order as a warehouse.

In 2006 planning application for conversion to apartments. The exterior window frames visible today are actually unglazed and provide open balcony screens designed to preserve the mill's original appearance.

== See also ==
- Listed buildings in Bolton
