= Random Cottage =

Listed house in Heaton, Greater Manchester, England

- Location within Greater Manchester

General information
- Location: Greenmount Lane, Heaton, Greater Manchester, England
- Coordinates: 53.5830°N 2.4695°W
- Year built: 1541; 485 years ago (possible)

Listed Building – Grade II*
- Official name: Random Cottage
- Designated: 26 April 1974
- Reference no.: 1388049

Random Cottage is a historic house on Greenmount Lane in Heaton, a district in Bolton, Greater Manchester, England. It is designated a Grade II* listed building, recognised for its architectural and historical significance. The building was added to Historic England's Heritage at Risk Register in 1998 because of its deteriorating condition, being assessed as at immediate risk with the roofless structure requiring urgent attention. In 1999 The Bolton News described it as the most serious case among the town's buildings at risk, noting that renovation work was expected to begin and that the cottage was then owned by the occupants of the adjoining farmhouse. As of 2025, it is no longer included on the register.

== History ==
The building is believed to date from the 16th century, with some sources suggesting a construction date around 1541. Originally built as a stone farmhouse, it reflects the rural heritage of Lancashire before Bolton's industrial expansion.

On 26 April 1974, Random Cottage was designated a Grade II* listed building.

== Architecture ==
The building is constructed from coursed and squared stone and features a stone-flagged roof. It is a two-storey cottage with a two-unit plan, entered through a central hall. The main doorway is flanked by a four-light mullioned window on the left and a six-light mullioned and transomed window on the right, both with hood moulds. The upper storey contains mullioned windows of two and four lights.

To the right of the cottage stands an outbuilding, which may have originally served a domestic function. This structure includes a blocked doorway on the left, partially cut by a buttress, and a current doorway accompanied by a four-light mullioned window. The gable end is built of rough stone, suggesting that the building may once have extended further east.

== Heritage at Risk Register ==
In 1998 Random Cottage was listed on Historic England's Heritage at Risk Register because of its poor condition and vulnerability. It was assessed as being in "immediate risk" of rapid deterioration, with the roofless structure requiring urgent intervention.

According to The Bolton News in 1999, Random Cottage was identified as the most serious case among Bolton's historic buildings at risk. The report noted that, despite its deteriorated condition, renovation work was expected to begin soon. At that time, the cottage was owned by the occupants of the adjoining farmhouse. As of 2025, the building is no longer listed on the register.

== See also ==
- Grade II* listed buildings in Greater Manchester
- Listed buildings in Bolton
