= Yates Wine Lodge, Bolton =

Listed former pub in Greater Manchester, England

Yates Wine Lodge
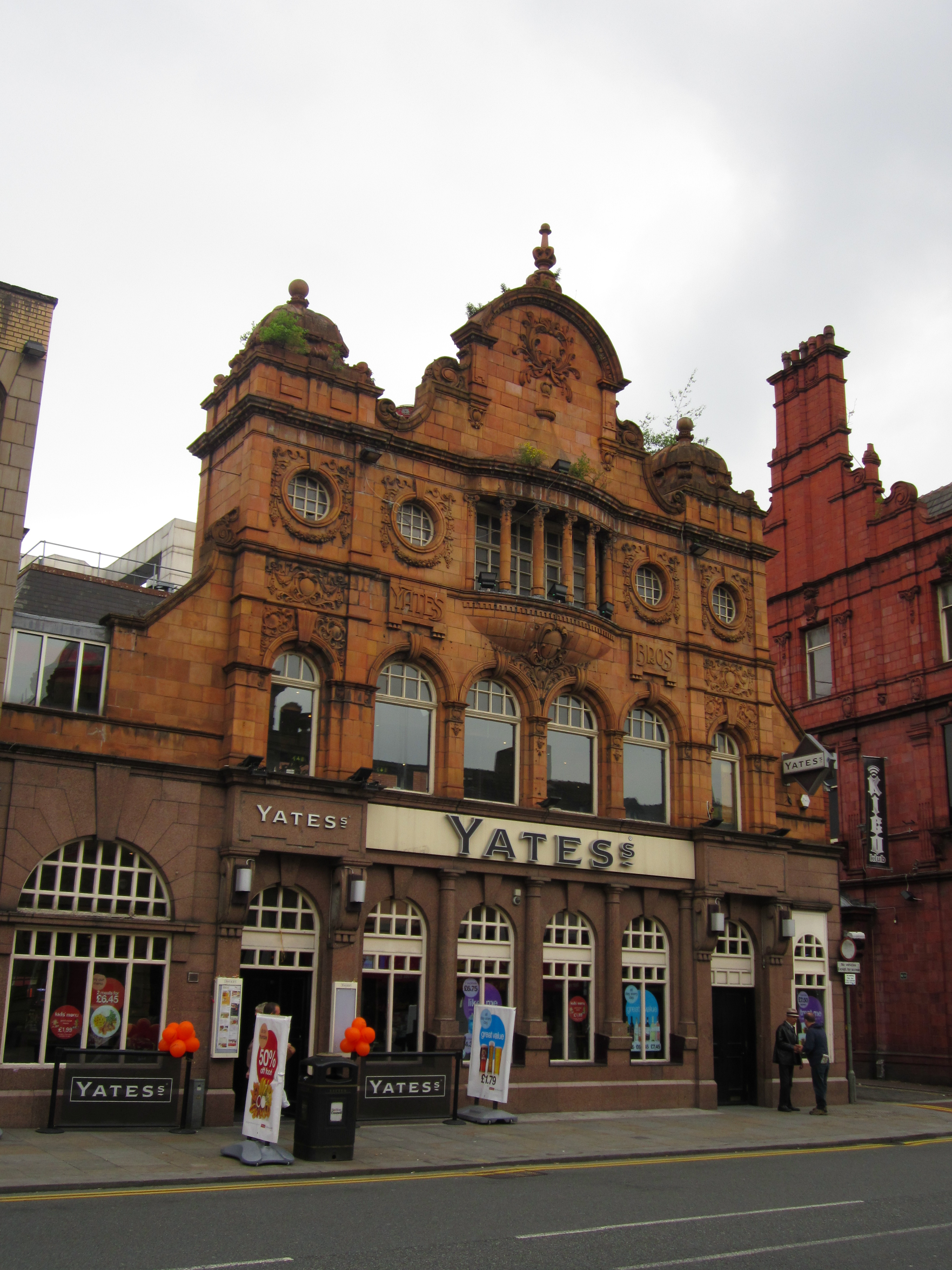
- The pub in 2013

- Location within Greater Manchester
- Alternative names: Yates' Wine Lodge; Yates's

General information
- Status: Vacant
- Type: Public house (former)
- Location: 36 Bradshawgate, Bolton, Greater Manchester, England
- Coordinates: 53.5789°N 2.4270°W
- Year built: 1906; 120 years ago
- Closed: 2025

Design and construction
- Designations

Listed Building – Grade II
- Official name: Yates Wine Lodge
- Designated: 30 April 1999
- Reference no.: 1387943

Yates Wine Lodge is a Grade II listed former public house on Bradshawgate in Bolton, Greater Manchester, England. Built in 1906, it operated for more than a century and was most recently run as a branch of the Yates's pub chain before closing in 2025.

== History ==
The building was constructed in 1906, according to its official listing. On the 1910 Ordnance Survey map it is marked as a public house.

On 30 April 1999, Yates Wine Lodge was designated a Grade II listed building. The premises operated for many years as a branch of the Yates's pub chain, latterly under the ownership of Stonegate Pub Company. A rebranding to a Slug and Lettuce was proposed in 2023, but the pub continued to trade under the Yates name. Stonegate began seeking new operators in 2024, and the venue subsequently closed permanently in January 2025. As of November 2026, no further update has been reported.

== Architecture ==
The building is faced in terracotta and has a slate roof. It is of three storeys with six bays arranged so that the outer ones are narrower and form small corner towers topped with domed roofs. The centre bay has a gable with a curved top.

There are doorways at each end of the ground floor, each beside a single‑storey side wing with a parapet linking back to the main front. The left wing has a large round‑arched window; the right has a small later window. Between the two doorways are four round‑arched windows set in a row.

The first floor has similar arched openings. On the second floor, the centre has a projecting window divided into four parts, with small circular windows on either side. The second‑floor windows have decorated panels beneath them, and the circular windows have carved swags. A band runs across the front above this level, and the gable above the centre bay is filled with ornate scrollwork.

== See also ==
- Listed buildings in Bolton
- Listed pubs in Greater Manchester
