= Matthew Brown brewery =

Former British brewery

Matthew Brown & Co. Ltd. was a British brewery founded in 1830.

The company was originally based at Pole Street, Preston, Lancashire before moving to the Lion Brewery on Coniston Road, Blackburn in 1927, following the acquisition of Nuttall & Co.

In 1984, the company acquired T & R Theakston Ltd. based in Masham.

Matthew Brown was the subject of a hostile takeover in 1987 by Scottish & Newcastle Breweries Ltd. and ceased brewing in 1991.
