= Lass O'Gowrie =

Listed pub in Manchester, England

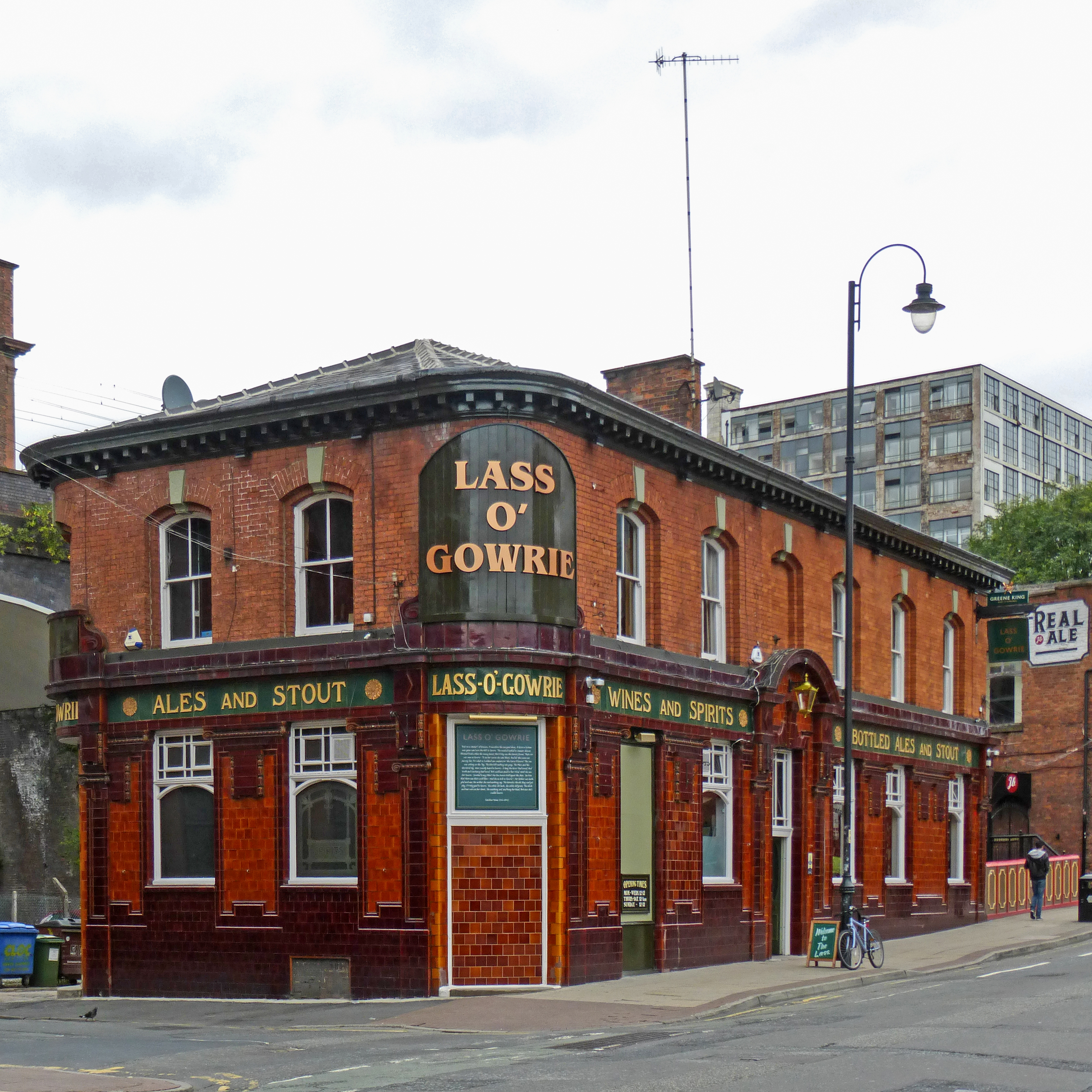
- The pub in 2014

General information
- Type: Public house
- Location: 36 Charles Street, Manchester, England
- Coordinates: 53.4739°N 2.2378°W
- Year built: Mid-19th century
- Renovated: c. 1900 (altered); 2014, 2022 (refurbished)
- Owner: Greene King

Design and construction
- Designations

Listed Building – Grade II
- Official name: Lass O'Gowrie public house
- Designated: 6 June 1994
- Reference no.: 1293175

Other information
- Public transit: Manchester Oxford Road

Website
- Official website

The Lass O'Gowrie is a Grade II listed public house on Charles Street in Manchester, England. Standing on the west bank of the River Medlock near Oxford Road, it is noted for its late‑Victorian tiled exterior and well‑preserved interior features. A pub has occupied the site since the mid‑19th century, with the present building dating from that period and altered around 1900. Formerly a Threlfalls house and later a brewpub, it has continued to serve the surrounding community and underwent major refurbishments in 2014 and 2022.

== History ==
A public house has stood on the site since the mid‑19th century. The present building dates from that period but was altered around 1900. The exterior is finished with decorative glazed tiles and faience typical of Manchester's pub architecture of the era. The pub takes its name from a 19th‑century poem by the Scottish songwriter Carolina Nairne.

During the Victorian period, the Lass O'Gowrie served a largely Irish immigrant community living and working in the nearby area. In the modern era, the pub serves a predominantly local and student clientele due to its proximity to the city's university and surrounding residential districts.

The pub was formerly a Threlfalls Brewery house and, after a period under Whitbread ownership, operated as a brewpub for several years during the 1980s. On 6 June 1994, the pub was designated a Grade II listed building.

The Lass O'Gowrie was named "Best Pub in Britain" in 2012 by Morning Advertiser, recognising its range of events, community role, and real‑ale offering.

The pub underwent a major refurbishment in 2014 following a change of management, with further work carried out in 2022 focused on repairs to the building fabric and additional improvements to the interior. As of June 2026, its freehold was owned by Greene King.

== Architecture ==
The building is constructed of red brick with coloured ceramic details and has a slate roof. It occupies a small island plot and is roughly rectangular, with chamfered corners at the western end. It has two main floors above a cellar. The side facing Charles Street has six window openings, and the western façade has two.

At street level, the exterior is heavily ornamented with patterned tiles, including vertical panels topped with simplified Ionic motifs. The main entrance, set slightly left of centre, is framed in a Baroque‑influenced style with a curved open pediment. A band of green tiles runs along the frontage, carrying raised lettering advertising drinks, with different wording on the front, the corner, and the west side. The ground‑floor windows use glass etchings, with three on the right of the doorway, one on the left, and two on the west end. A former corner entrance has been converted into a window.

The upper floor has windows with shallow arched heads and keystones; the one above the doorway is blocked, while the others contain recessed four‑pane sashes. A pronounced cornice with decorative brackets runs around the top of the walls. The roof is hipped and includes a chimney along the ridge.

== See also ==
- Listed buildings in Manchester-M1
- Listed pubs in Greater Manchester
