= Punch Bowl, Salford =

Listed former pub in England

Punch Bowl
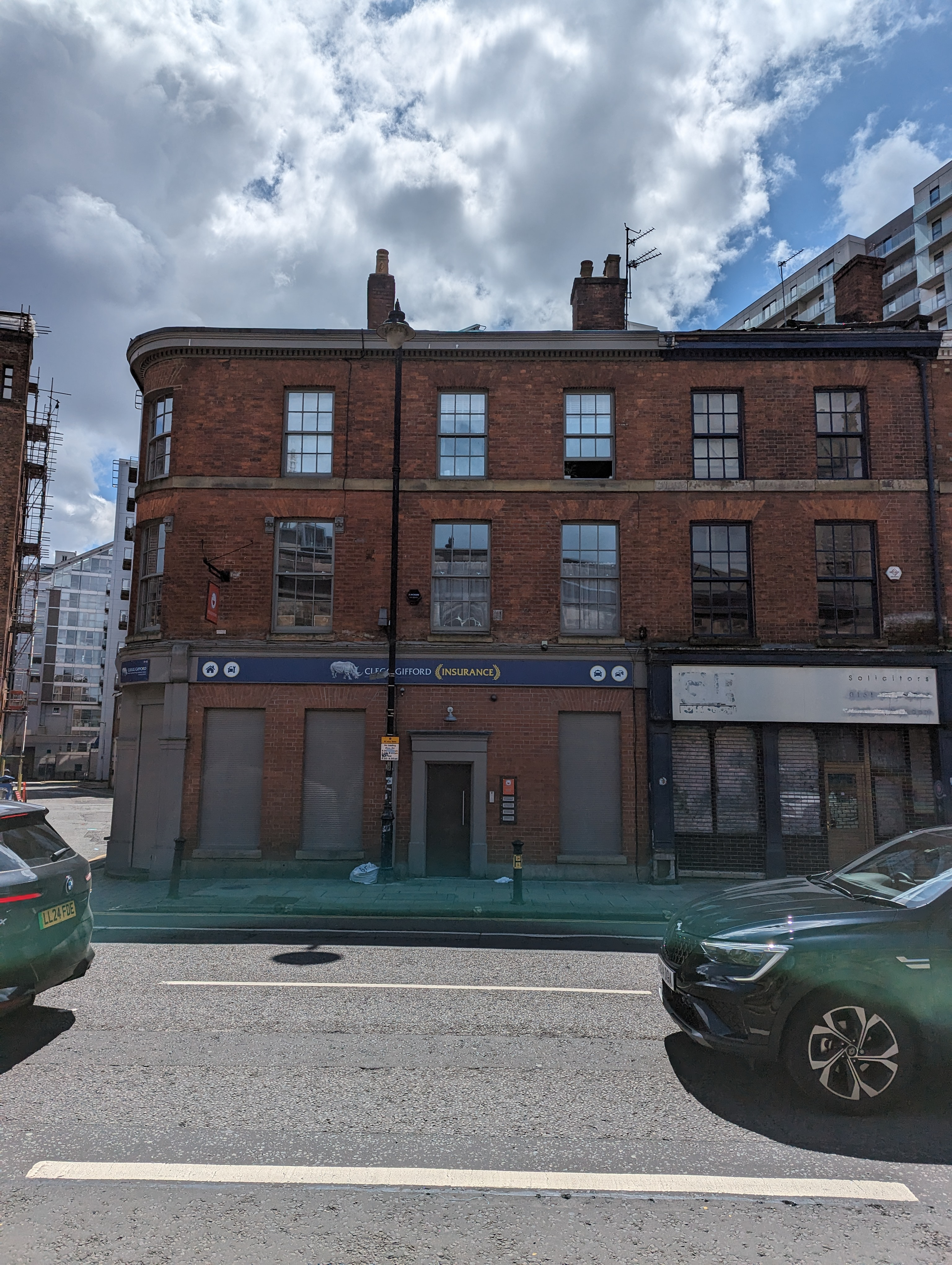
- The former pub in 2024

- Location within Greater Manchester
- Former names: Waggon and Horses

General information
- Status: Converted to offices
- Type: Public house (former)
- Location: 81 Chapel Street, Salford, England
- Coordinates: 53.4846°N 2.2502°W
- Year built: 1817; 209 years ago (mainly)
- Renovated: Late 19th century (refronted)
- Closed: c. 2010 (as a pub)

Design and construction
- Designations

Listed Building – Grade II
- Official name: No. 81 Chapel Street and No. 4 Booth Street
- Designated: 9 March 1989
- Reference no.: 1386114

The Punch Bowl (officially listed as No. 81 Chapel Street and No. 4 Booth Street) is a Grade II listed former public house on Chapel Street in Salford, England. It was mainly built in 1817 as two separate pubs, which were later combined into a single premises and refronted in the late 19th century, although the date of the amalgamation is not recorded. The pub closed around 2010 and was subsequently converted to office use.

== History ==
The building was mainly constructed in 1817 as two separate public houses, including the Waggon and Horses, according to its official listing. These were later brought together to form a single establishment and given a new frontage in the late 19th century, although the point at which they were combined is not documented. The 1922 and 1933 Ordnance Survey maps show it in use as a public house without an attributed name.

On 9 March 1989, the Punch Bowl was designated a Grade II listed building. The Campaign for Real Ale (CAMRA) lists the pub as having closed around 2010, although the exact date is unclear; the building was subsequently converted for office use. The building stands directly opposite the mid-18th-century, Grade II*-listed Sacred Trinity Church.

== Architecture ==
The building is constructed in red brick, with darker bricks visible on the Booth Street side, and has a slate roof. The main section is of three storeys, with two windows facing Chapel Street, one set on the curved corner with Booth Street, and three more along the return. The entrance sits across the corner, with arched windows to one side. A later 19th‑century pub frontage runs along both elevations, supported by large decorative brackets. The upper floors have traditional sash windows, and there is a continuous band beneath the second‑floor windows, along with a detailed eaves line and chimneys at each end.

Along Booth Street is a lower two‑storey wing that once housed the Waggon and Horses. This part has four windows on the upper floor and a doorway to the right. Two later 19th‑century pub windows sit below, each divided into three arched sections. The upper windows here are also sash windows, set beneath shallow brick arches.

== See also ==
- Listed buildings in Salford
- Listed pubs in Greater Manchester
