= Coach and Horses, Weaste =

Listed former pub in Salford, England

Coach and Horses
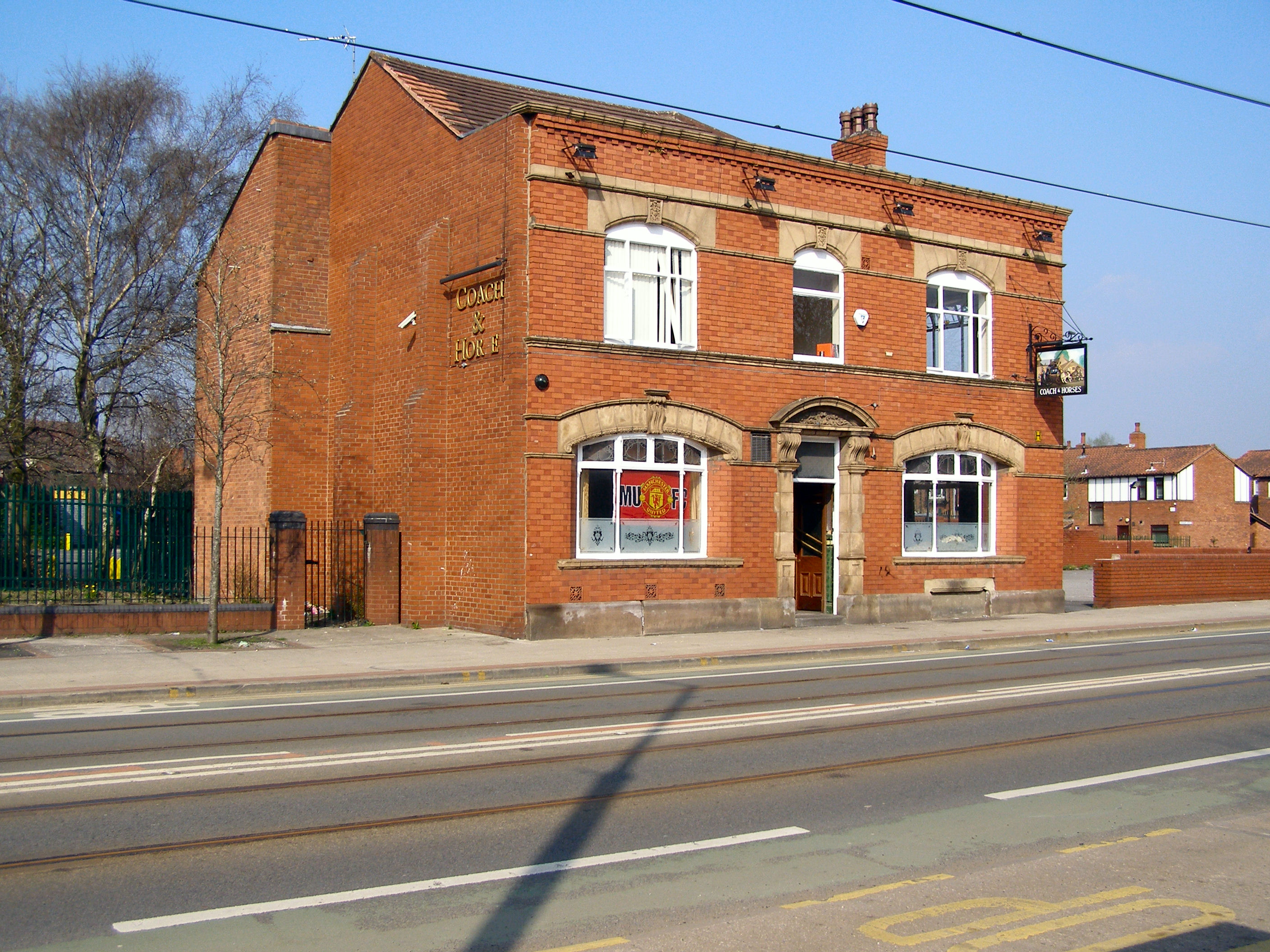
- The pub in 2010

General information
- Status: Vacant
- Type: Public house (former)
- Location: 350 Eccles New Road, Weaste, Salford, England
- Coordinates: 53.4819°N 2.3040°W
- Year built: 1913; 113 years ago
- Renovated: 2014
- Closed: 2021
- Client: Rochdale & Manor Brewery

Design and construction
- Designations

Listed Building – Grade II
- Official name: Coach & Horses public house
- Designated: 30 January 2012
- Reference no.: 1403265

The Coach and Horses is a Grade II listed former public house on Eccles New Road in Weaste, an inner-city suburb of Salford, England. Built in 1913 for the Rochdale & Manor Brewery, it was later acquired by Samuel Smiths and is rated by the Campaign for Real Ale (CAMRA) with three stars for having an interior of "outstanding national historic importance". The pub closed in 2021, and its future as of October 2026 is uncertain.

== History ==
The public house was constructed in 1913 for the Rochdale & Manor Brewery, according to its official listing. The building was originally surrounded by terraced housing and stood on the corner of Eccles New Road and a small street known as Robinson's Buildings. Almost all of the surrounding terraces and their streets, including Robinson's Buildings, have since been demolished. The 1922 and 1933 Ordnance Survey maps show the building but do not indicate a designation or name. In 1947 the pub was acquired by Samuel Smiths brewery.

The Coach and Horses is regarded by the Campaign for Real Ale (CAMRA) as having an interior of "outstanding national historic importance" and is rated three stars on its National Inventory of Historic Pub Interiors.

On 30 January 2012, the Coach and Horses was designated a Grade II listed building. Sensitive repair and renovation work was carried out on the pub in mid‑2014. The pub temporarily closed in early 2017 before reopening in November that year; it closed permanently in October 2021. As of October 2026, no publicly available information has been released regarding the pub's current condition or future use.

== Architecture ==
=== Exterior ===
The building is constructed in red brick with stone detailing, and its roofline is mostly hidden behind a parapet. The main front faces south‑west and is arranged in three bays above a stone base. The central entrance is framed by carved stonework and has a panelled door with stained glass above it. On either side are large bay windows with decorative stone heads and stained‑glass upper sections, while the upper floor has three windows set between horizontal stone bands.

The north‑west side has no openings and is marked by tall brick projections. Modern gold lettering spelling out the pub's name is fixed towards the far end of this elevation.

The south‑east side mirrors the general layout of the front, with three main bays and an added single‑storey section that projects at ground level. The entrance on this side matches the one at the front, and the ground‑floor windows follow the same pattern, though one is slightly narrower. The upper windows keep their original glazing with stained‑glass details, and two later openings have been added. A tall brick chimney stack rises behind the parapet.

=== Interior ===
The interior keeps many of its early decorative features, including moulded detailing, timber surrounds and part‑glazed doors. Both entrances open into small lobbies with patterned mosaic floors and tiled lower walls, each displaying "COACH AND HORSES". Beyond these, the same tiling continues into the central lobby and up the main stair. The lobby itself is L‑shaped, has a black‑and‑white tiled floor, and widens towards the rear where it connects to the toilets and the smoke room. The bar stands at the centre and serves several rooms; it has a panelled counter and a timber and glass screen above, with stained‑glass panels surviving in some sections.

Several rooms lead off the lobby. The lounge sits at the front left and keeps its original fixed seating, bell pushes and decorative frieze, though its fireplace has been replaced and an earlier double doorway altered. The smoke room is at the rear right and is entered through a doorway with stained glass; it retains its wall rails but has lost its original seating. Two small service rooms also survive: the former outdoor department, which has a tiled floor and a timber bench, and the vault, which has a geometric tiled floor, fixed seating and baffles. Both rooms have doors with etched glass panels naming their original functions.

The main stair rises from the back of the lobby and has turned balusters and shaped newel posts. A doorway beside it, marked "PRIVATE", leads to a rear ground‑floor area, and the basement stair is tucked beneath. Later alterations include a modern fire‑exit opening on the stair landing and boxed‑in sections at first‑floor level.

== See also ==
- Listed buildings in Salford
- Listed pubs in Greater Manchester
