= The Crown, Salford =

Listed former pub in England

The Crown
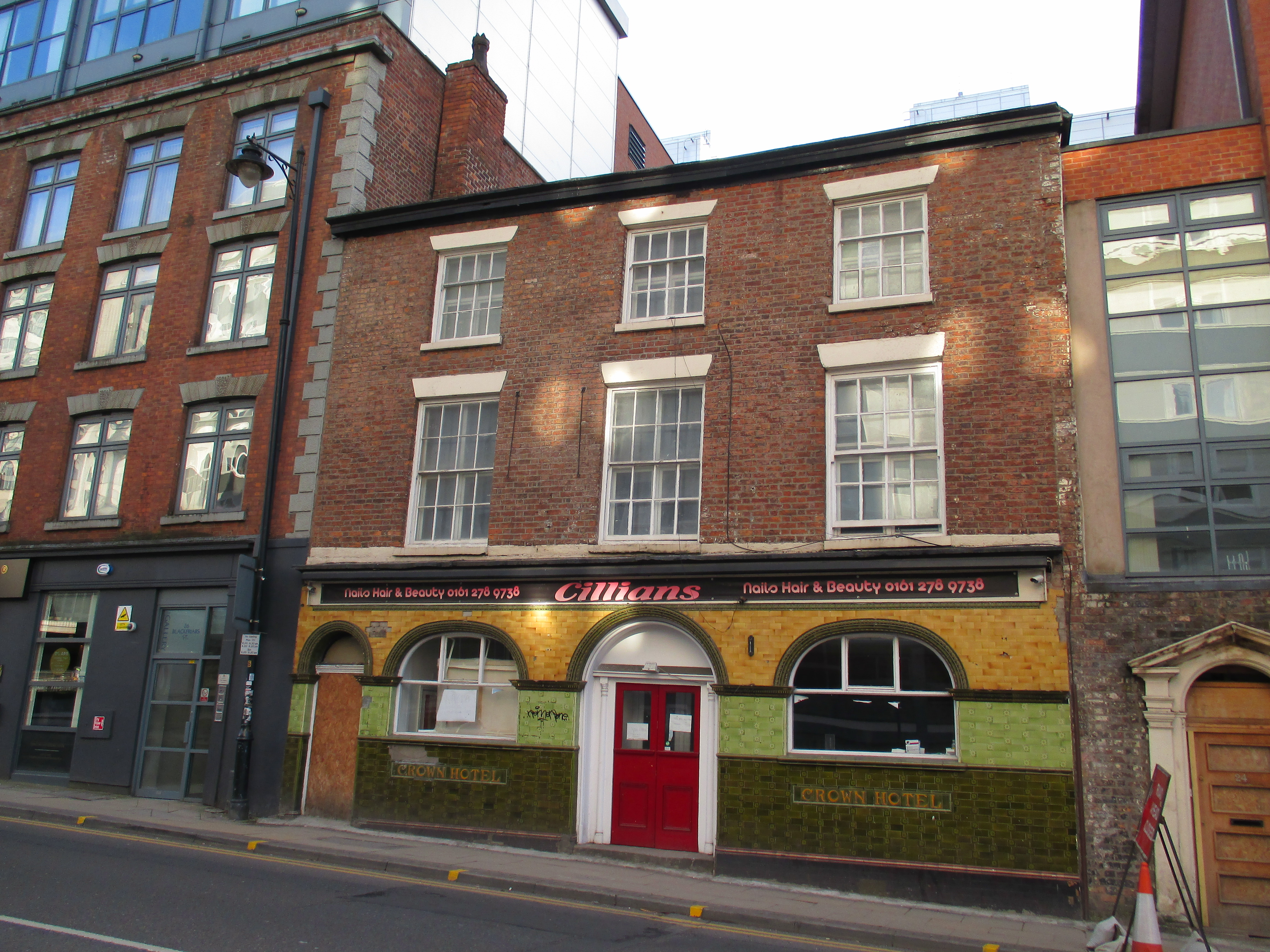
- The former pub in 2015

- Location within Greater Manchester
- Alternative names: Crown Hotel; Crown Tavern

General information
- Status: Converted to commercial use
- Type: Public house (former)
- Location: 24 Blackfriars Street, Salford, England
- Coordinates: 53.4841°N 2.2487°W
- Year built: Early 19th century
- Closed: 1970 (as a pub)

Design and construction
- Designations

Listed Building – Grade II
- Official name: The Crown Tavern
- Designated: 18 January 1980
- Reference no.: 1386084

The Crown is a Grade II listed former public house on Blackfriars Street in Salford, England. Built in the early 19th century, it gained a tiled frontage in the late 19th century with "Crown Hotel" set into the tilework. The pub closed in 1970, and the building was later adapted for commercial use, becoming a nail bar and beauty salon in 2012.

== History ==
The building was constructed in the early 19th century, according to its official listing. A late 19th‑century refurbishment introduced a tiled street front, with "Crown Hotel" spelled out in the tilework. The 1922 and 1933 Ordnance Survey maps show it in use as a public house, although neither edition gives a name.

The pub closed in 1970, and the building was later converted into a nail bar and beauty salon in 2012. On 18 January 1980, The Crown was designated a Grade II listed building.

== Architecture ==
The building is finished in painted brick and has a Welsh slate roof. It rises to three storeys with three windows across the front. The ground floor was given a later 19th‑century pub frontage, including a central arched entrance with double doors, flanked by arched windows and a smaller doorway to the left. The name "Crown Hotel" appears in tiled lettering below the windows, with decorative tiles outlining the door and window arches and a moulded band running across the width of the façade.

The upper floors have traditional sash windows, with larger panes on the first floor and smaller ones at attic level, each set beneath simple flat heads. Chimney stacks stand at each end of the roof.

== See also ==
- Listed buildings in Salford
- Listed pubs in Greater Manchester
