= Black Friar, Salford =

Listed pub in England

Black Friar
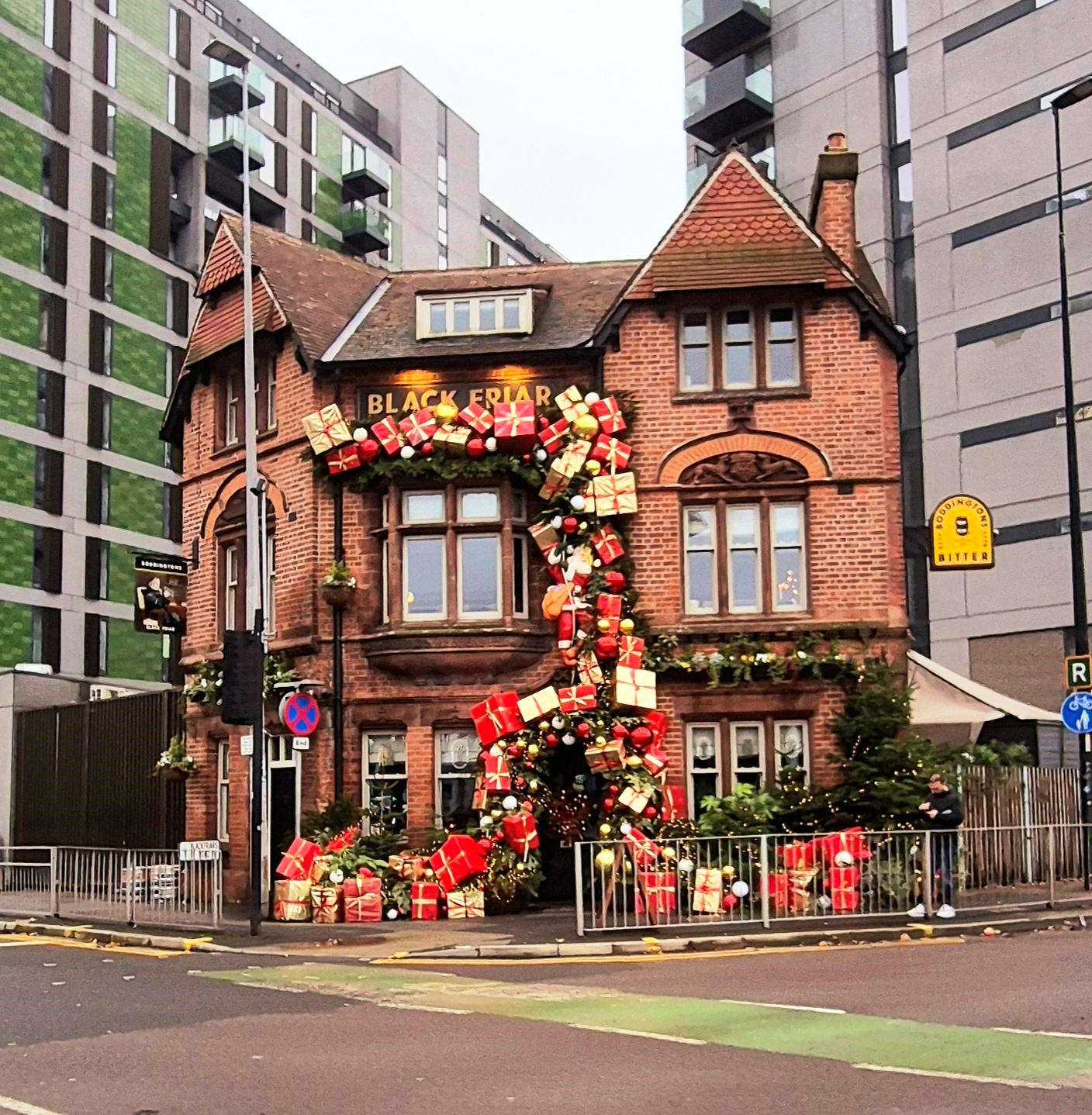
- The pub in 2024

- Location within Greater Manchester

General information
- Type: Public house
- Architectural style: Vernacular Revival
- Location: 41–43 Blackfriars Road, Salford, England
- Coordinates: 53.4866°N 2.2535°W
- Year built: 1886; 140 years ago
- Client: Henry Boddington II

Design and construction
- Architect: William Ball
- Designations

Listed Building – Grade II
- Official name: Black Friar public house
- Designated: 15 April 1994
- Reference no.: 1386081

Website
- theblackfriarsalford.co.uk

The Black Friar is a Grade II listed public house on Blackfriars Road in Salford, England. Built in 1886 in a Vernacular Revival style for Henry Boddington II and attributed to the Manchester architect William Ball, it replaced the Old School Inn on King Street after the creation of Blackfriars Road in the 1880s. The pub was a Boddington's house, though the dates of its inclusion in the brewery's estate are not documented. After nearly two decades of closure and dereliction, including damage from vandalism and a major fire, it reopened in 2021 as a gastropub.

== History ==
The building was constructed in 1886, according to its official listing, for Henry Boddington II of the brewery family and is attributed to the Manchester architect William Ball. It was built as a replacement for the Old School Inn on King Street after the creation of Blackfriars Road in the 1880s. The 1922 and 1933 Ordnance Survey maps show the building but do not indicate a designation or name.

The pub was formerly a Boddington's house, but the period during which it belonged to the brewery's estate is not documented in the published sources. On 15 April 1994, the Black Friar was designated a Grade II listed building.

The Black Friar reopened in 2021 as a gastropub after having been closed and derelict for around 20 years, during which time the building suffered vandalism and a major fire.

== Architecture ==
=== Exterior ===
The building is constructed in red brick with red sandstone details and some tile‑hung sections, and has a slate roof. It is designed in a Vernacular Revival style and has a modified L‑shaped plan. It has two and a half storeys above cellars and three main front bays, with the outer bays gabled. The ground floor includes two entrances with shaped surrounds, one topped by a swan‑necked pediment, and a mixture of single, paired and three‑part sash windows.

On the first floor, the central bay has a stone oriel window with a carved band beneath it reading "YOU MAY GO FURTHER AND FARE WORSE". The outer bays have three‑part windows with decorative brick and stone panels above: one shows a friar holding a banner with the words "THE BLACK FRIAR", and the other includes a shield with corn sheaves and bees and the words "BLACKFRIARS" and "OLD SCHOOL", wording that may relate to the earlier public house of that name. The gabled bays have three‑light windows, and the centre has a flat‑roofed dormer.

The left side wall has a tall chimney that projects from the first floor and rises through the eaves, with a stone plaque at its base inscribed "Rebuilt AD 1886".

=== Interior ===
The inside retains some original fittings and elements of the historic layout. The entrance lobby has a doorway to the left leading to the vault, with another door ahead containing cut and etched glass. The hall includes an altered curved bar and a staircase in a Jacobean style. The parlour has two altered lobby screens, fixed upholstered seating, bell pushes and a fireplace. The vault has simple fixed seating and a modern opening leading to a remodelled area at the rear.

== See also ==
- Listed buildings in Salford
- Listed pubs in Greater Manchester
