= The Crescent (pub) =

Listed former pub in Salford, England

- The pub in 2013

- Location within Greater Manchester
- Former names: Red Dragon

General information
- Status: Derelict
- Type: Public house (former)
- Location: 20 Crescent (A6), Salford, England
- Coordinates: 53.4829°N 2.2670°W
- Year built: Early 19th century
- Closed: 2017

Design and construction
- Designations

Listed Building – Grade II
- Official name: 19, 20 and 21, The Crescent
- Designated: 18 January 1980
- Reference no.: 1386171

The Crescent (officially listed as 19, 20 and 21 The Crescent) is a Grade II listed former public house on Crescent (A6) in Salford, England. Built in the early 19th century as a terrace of three houses and later combined and converted into a pub, it is associated in local tradition with visits by Karl Marx and Friedrich Engels. The building remained in use as a pub until its closure in 2017, after which it fell into disrepair and became the subject of an urgent works notice in 2025. Its future as of November 2026 is uncertain.

== History ==
The building was constructed in the early 19th century as a terrace of three houses before later being combined and converted into a public house, according to its official listing. Local tradition holds that Karl Marx and Friedrich Engels were among the pub's notable visitors in the past. The 1922 and 1933 Ordnance Survey maps show the building but do not indicate a designation or name. The pub was previously known as the Red Dragon, although the date at which this name was adopted is not recorded.

On 18 January 1980, The Crescent was designated a Grade II listed building. The pub closed in August 2017, and has since fallen into a state of disrepair. In October 2025 an urgent works notice was issued to the private owners, requiring measures to safeguard the building after Salford City Council determined that intervention was needed to prevent its loss. After the notice was issued, the owners stated that they would carry out the required repairs themselves, removing the need for the council to intervene and recover the costs. As of November 2026, no publicly available information has been released regarding the pub's current condition or future use.

== Architecture ==
=== Exterior ===
The building has a roughcast finish over brick and a roof of Welsh slate. It is of three storeys with six windows across the front. There are two doorways, each set within a small pedimented surround, with fixed windows to the sides and between them, and two four‑pane sash windows to the right. The upper floors have 12‑pane sash windows, though some have been replaced with fixed panes. The attic level has two windows, one set within a pedimented dormer.

=== Interior ===
The main part of the interior is formed by three rooms grouped around a central island bar. A separate fourth room is provided for functions and other events.

== See also ==
- Listed buildings in Salford
- Listed pubs in Greater Manchester
