= Listed buildings in Salford =

Salford is a city in the City of Salford Metropolitan Borough, Greater Manchester, England. The city, which includes the suburbs of Broughton, Charlestown, Kersal, Ordsall, Pendleton, and Weaste, contains 133 listed buildings that are recorded in the National Heritage List for England. Of these, two are listed at Grade I, the highest of the three grades, 10 are at Grade II*, the middle grade, and the others are at Grade II, the lowest grade.

Although Salford was a manor recorded in the Domesday Book, few listed buildings date from before the arrival of the Industrial Revolution in the form of the textile industry. There was a considerable increase in population in the early 19th century, particularly following the arrival of the railways, and many houses date from between 1830 and 1850, and these were followed by churches and public buildings. The earliest listed buildings are a country house, a manor house and a church. In the early 19th century are a public house, churches and a bridge. Following that are houses, more churches, and a surviving mill; then there are more houses and associated structures, churches and items in churchyards, and public buildings. Other later types of listed buildings include railway structures, memorials and statues, social clubs, offices, a former school, a telephone kiosk, and items of public art.

== Key ==
Grade	Criteria
I	Buildings of exceptional interest, sometimes considered to be internationally important
II*	Particularly important buildings of more than special interest
II	Buildings of national importance and special interest

== Buildings ==
Name and location	Photograph	Date	Notes	Grade
Ordsall Hall; 53.46930°N 2.27762°W		Early 16th century	A country house, extended in about 1639, and restored and extended in 1896–97 by Alfred Darbyshire. The original part is timber framed with slate roofs, and the extensions are in brick with terracotta dressings. The building has a central open hall with gabled two-storey cross-wings. The windows are mullioned or mullioned and transomed, and there is a large two-storey canted bay window.	I
Kersal Cell; 53.51017°N 2.28860°W		16th century	A manor house, later used for other purposes, it is timber framed on a sandstone plinth with plaster infill, and it originated as a cruck-framed building. The house consists of a three-bay hall with gabled cross-wings, it has two storeys, and the windows are mullioned. The rear is in brick and contains Gothic-style windows with hood moulds. On the side walls are exposed cruck trusses and on the west side is a decorative plaster frieze.	II*
Sacred Trinity Church; 53.48484°N 2.25040°W		1635 (tower), 1752	The oldest part is the tower, the rest of the church was rebuilt in 1752, and the church was restored in 1871–74. It is in stone, and consists of a nave, a shallow chancel, and a west tower. The tower has angle pilasters, and at the top is a triglyph frieze, an embattled parapet with finials, and a small spire with a weathervane. Along the sides of the church are two tiers of round-headed windows with keystones, and below the parapet is a modillion eaves cornice.	II*
No. 81 Chapel Street and No. 4 Booth Street (former Punch Bowl public house); 53.48461°N 2.25014°W		1817 (mainly)	Originally two public houses, later used for other purposes, the building is in brick with a modillion eaves cornice and Welsh slate roofs. The main block, on a corner site, has three storeys, one bay on Chapel Street, three on Booth Street, and a curved bay on the corner. The doorway, in the corner bay, has a large fascia on consoles, the windows are sashes, and between the upper floors is a sill band. On Booth Street is a two-storey, four-bay block with mullioned windows on the ground floor and sash windows above.	II
Chapel Street and Hope United Reformed Church; 53.48375°N 2.25480°W		1819	The church is in brick on a stone plinth, with stone dressings, a string course, a parapet, and a hipped Welsh slate roof. It has a single storey over a basement and five bays. In the second and fourth bays are doorways, and in the other bays are windows, all with round heads. The doorways have moulded architraves and radial fanlights. Steps lead up to the doorways and between them is a balustraded balcony. Above the doorways are inscribed stones.	II
22–34 The Crescent; 53.48288°N 2.26805°W		c. 1820	A slightly curving terrace of 13 houses, later offices, with stone dressings and a Welsh slate roof. They have three storeys, and each house has three bays. Most of the doorways have Corinthian shafts carrying an entablature with a triglyph and modillion frieze and a fanlight. The windows are sashes.	II
Blackfriars Bridge; 53.48383°N 2.24790°W		c. 1820	The bridge carries Blackfriars Street on a slope over the River Irwell. It is in stone and cast iron, and consists of three semicircular arches, partly embedded in the river bank. On each side of the central arch are paired Ionic pilasters, the voussoirs have vermiculated rustication, and the outer faces of the parapets are balustraded.	II
St Philip's Church; 53.48405°N 2.26314°W		1822–1824	A Commissioners' church designed by Robert Smirke in Greek Revival style, and reordered in 1895 by J. Medland Taylor. It is in ashlar stone, and has a rectangular plan and two storeys. On the south side is a semicircular porch with six unfluted Ionic columns and a balustraded parapet. The doorway has a Doric architrave. Above the porch is a circular bell tower with two stages; the lower stage has engaged fluted shafts with Corinthian capitals and a cornice. In the upper stage are pilasters, round-arched openings, and a domed cap. The lower storey contains flat-headed windows, and above are larger round-headed windows. There are pediments at the east and west ends, and inside are galleries on three sides.	II*
Islington Mill; 53.48188°N 2.26344°W		1823	A cotton spinning mill, later extended and then used for other purposes, it is in brick with slate roofs. The main block is fire-proof with an internal structure of cast iron columns and brick arches. It has six storeys and twelve bays, a lift tower and a stair tower. There is a second mill with three storeys and a stair tower. Also on the site, with all the buildings surrounding a courtyard, are an external engine house and boiler house, a warehouse range, offices, and stabling.	II
Summer Hill; 53.49323°N 2.29892°W	—	c. 1825	A detached house in Tudor Revival style, later used for other purposes. It is stone-faced and has a Welsh slate roof, and the parapets are embattled throughout. There are two storeys, a symmetrical range of five bays, and a recessed two-bay left wing. The central porch has a four-centred arch and an inner doorway with a traceried fanlight. Flanking the central bay are pilasters that rise to form turrets, and there are angle buttresses rising to octagonal finials. The windows are mullioned and transomed, and in the left wing is a square bay window.	II
1 Massey Street; 53.48294°N 2.26722°W	—	Early 19th century	A house in roughcast brick with a slate roof, it has three storeys and two bays. The doorway has a pediment, and the windows are sashes.	II
2, 4 and 6 Acton Square; 53.48407°N 2.27352°W	—	Early 19th century	A terrace of three brick houses, later used as offices, on a stone plinth, with a sill band, a wooden modillion eaves, and a slate roof. There are two storeys, and each house has three bays. In the central bay of each house is a doorway with an Ionic architrave and a traceried fanlight in a shallow segmental arch. The windows are sashes.	II
6–12 Encombe Place; 53.48455°N 2.26292°W		Early 19th century	A terrace of four brick houses on a stone plinth, with stone dressings, a first floor sill band, an eaves cornice, and a Welsh slate roof. They have three storeys, and each house has three bays. The doorways are approached up steps, and have moulded architraves with Ionic shafts and flat entablatures. The windows are sashes, those on the ground floor with aprons.	II
17 The Crescent; 53.48303°N 2.26671°W	—	Early 19th century	A brick house, later offices, on a stone plinth, with stone dressings, pilasters, a stone eaves cornice and blocking course, and a hipped Welsh slate roof. It has two storeys, five bays, and flanking single-storey bays. Steps lead up to the central doorway, which has engaged Ionic columns and pilasters, a fanlight, and an entablature. The windows are sashes with aprons, the window above the doorway having an architrave and a cornice on consoles. In the outer bays are infilled segmental archways.	II
19, 20 and 21; The Crescent; 53.48298°N 2.26703°W		Early 19th century	Originally a terrace of three houses, later combined to form a public house, since closed, it is in roughcast brick with a Welsh slate roof. There are three storeys and six bays, two doorways, one with a pedimented doorcase, and sash windows. On the roof is a pedimented dormer.	II
32, 34 and 36 Broad Street; 53.48960°N 2.28075°W	—	Early 19th century	A terrace of three brick houses with a modillion eaves cornice and a Welsh slate roof. There are two storeys and eight bays. The first bay projects slightly, the next five bays are symmetrical under a pediment, and the end two bays also project slightly. The doorways have architraves, round heads and fanlights, and the windows are sashes.	II
Bollards south of St Philip's Church; 53.48382°N 2.26331°W	—	Early 19th century	A row of eleven cast iron columnar bollards at the edge of the pavement to the south and west of the church.	II
Bollards west of St Philip's Church; 53.48391°N 2.26346°W	—	Early 19th century	A row of eight cast iron columnar bollards at the edge of the pavement to the south and west of the church.	II
Former Kersal Bar Toll House; 53.51486°N 2.26898°W		Early 19th century	The former toll house is in stuccoed brick with a felt roof. It has an octagonal plan, a single storey, and a rectangular bay to the right. The entrance is on the left, and the windows, which are replacements, have hood moulds.	II
Joule House and 48 and 49 The Crescent; 53.48419°N 2.27274°W		Early 19th century	A group of three brick houses, later used as offices, with a first floor band, a plain eaves cornice, angle pilasters, and a slate roof. They have three storeys, eight bays on The Crescent, four on Acton Square, and a lower wing beyond. Each house has a projecting Ionic doorcase, and the windows are sashes. The scientist James Prescott Joule lived and worked in Joule House.	II
The Crown Tavern; 53.48417°N 2.24863°W		Early 19th century	The former public house is in brick with a Welsh slate roof, three storeys and three bays. The ground floor is tiled, and in the centre is a round-headed doorway that has an architrave with shafts. Above the ground floor is a moulded fascia, and on the upper floors are sash windows with flat-arched stuccoed heads.	II
Buile Hill; 53.49051°N 2.30544°W		1825–1827	A large house, later used for other purposes, designed by Charles Barry, and extended in the 1860s by Edward Walters. It is in ashlar stone and has a Welsh slate roof, and three storeys. In the centre is a porte-cochère with two fluted Doric columns carrying an entablature with a triglyph frieze. Flanking this are two bays, there is a two-bay wing recessed to the right and a further single-storey wing to the right of this. In the centre of the house is an open pavilion with a balustrade. All the windows are sashes. In the garden front is a doorway with a Doric architrave and square bay windows with balustraded parapets.	II
Town Hall; 53.48390°N 2.25909°W		1825–1827	Originally a market hall and used as the town hall from 1853, the front and first bay were designed by Richard Lane in Neoclassical style, and additions have since been made to the rear. The front is in ashlar stone, and has two storeys and a symmetrical front of five bays. The central three bays project forward under a pediment, and there are two central engaged fluted Doric columns, two outer pilasters, and an entablature with a laurel wreath frieze. At the corners are similar pilasters, the central doorway has a fanlight, and the windows are sashes, those on the outer ground floor with entablatures on console blocks. Behind is a long brick range in varying heights.	II
St Thomas' Church, Pendleton; 53.49216°N 2.28568°W		1829–1831	A Commissioners' church by Francis Goodwin and Richard Lane in Gothic style. It is in stone, and consists of a nave, north and south aisles, a chancel, and a west tower flanked by porches. There are embattled parapets on the body of the church and on the tower, which also has corner pinnacles. The aisle windows have Decorated tracery, and the east window has six lights and Perpendicular tracery.	II
Railway bridge to former Liverpool Road Station; 53.47794°N 2.25997°W		1830	The bridge was designed by George Stephenson to carry the Liverpool and Manchester Railway over the River Irwell into Liverpool Road railway station. It is in stone and consists of two segmental arches with a central pier and a cutwater. The arches have voussoirs, there are pilasters flanking the pier, and the bridge has a cornice and a parapet with plain coping.	I
1 Hulme Place; 53.48292°N 2.26861°W	—	c. 1830	A brick house, later offices, with a Welsh slate roof, three storeys, three bays, and a lower two-storey range to the right. In the centre of the main block is a doorway with a pedimented doorcase, and the windows are sashes.	II
30 Broad Street; 53.48950°N 2.28062°W	—	c. 1830	A brick house in a terrace with a moulded wood eaves cornice and a Welsh slate roof. There are three storeys and three narrow bays. The round-headed doorway in the left bay has an architrave and a fanlight, and the windows are sashes.	II
258 Great Clowes Street and 1 Murray Street; 53.50243°N 2.26378°W	—	c. 1830	Originally two houses, later combined and used for other purposes, the building is stuccoed with a sill band, a plain wood eaves cornice, and a hipped Welsh slate roof. There are two storeys with a basement, seven bays on Great Clowes Street, and three on Murray Street. On both fronts is an Ionic portico, and the windows are replacements.	II
260 Great Clowes Street; 53.50248°N 2.26393°W	—	c. 1830	A house at the end of a terrace, stuccoed with a sill band, a plain wood eaves cornice, an angle pilaster, and a Welsh slate roof. There are two storeys and three bays. In the left bay is a recessed doorway with an architrave, and an entablature on Ionic pilasters. Some of the windows are sashes, and others are replacements.	II
Drinking fountain 53.49172°N 2.28506°W	—	c. 1830	The drinking fountain is in the wall at the corner of the churchyard of St Thomas' Church, Pendleton. It is in stone and consists of a chamfered pier with a corbelled cornice and a coped pyramidal cap. There are two basins in niches with trefoil heads and shafts with foliate capitals.	II
Railings, gates and gate piers, St Thomas' Church, Pendleton; 53.49241°N 2.28544°W	—	c. 1830	A low brick wall runs along the north side of the churchyard, and is surmounted by chamfered stone coping and cast iron railings. The gate piers have polygonal angle pilasters and volutes.	II
St John's Church, Broughton; 53.50438°N 2.26205°W		1836–1839	The church was designed by Richard Lane, and the chancel was added in 1846. The church is in stone with a Welsh slate roof, and consists of a nave, a chancel with north and south vestries, and a west tower with flanking porches. The parapets are embattled. The tower has three stages, angle buttresses rising to tall pinnacles, a clock face, and an embattled parapet. Most of the windows contain Decorated tracery.	II
Victoria Bridge; 53.48490°N 2.24607°W		1839	The bridge carries Victoria Bridge Street over the River Irwell, and is in rusticated sandstone. It consists of a single segmental arch with a string course and shallow chamfered copings. In the centre are inscribed panels with ball finials and volutes, and at the ends are pilasters.	II
122 Great Clowes Street; 53.49572°N 2.25903°W	—	c. 1840	A brick house with a sill band, a plain wood eaves cornice, and a Welsh slate roof. There are three storeys and six bays. Steps lead up to the round-headed doorway that has an architrave and a fanlight, and the windows are sashes.	II
208 and 210 Great Clowes Street; 53.49996°N 2.25989°W	—	c. 1840	Originally two houses, later divided into flats, the building is in brick with stone dressings, a first floor sill band, and a hipped concrete tile roof. There are three storeys, a symmetrical front of five bays, and a recessed wing at the rear. In the centre is a Roman Doric portico with an entablature and a cornice, and the windows are sashes.	II
319 Bury New Road; 53.50219°N 2.25852°W	—	c. 1840	A brick house with a sill band, a moulded wood eaves cornice, and a hipped Welsh slate roof. There are two storeys and three bays. The central doorway has a segmental arch, an Ionic architrave and a traceried fanlight, and the windows are replacements. On the north side is a round-arched stair window.	II
393–407 Bury New Road; 53.50635°N 2.26124°W	—	c. 1840	A terrace of eight stuccoed houses with quoins, a modillion eaves cornice, and a Welsh slate roof. They have three storeys and 18 bays, the outer four bays at each end projecting forward. The doorways have moulded architraves and fanlights, and the windows, also with moulded architraves, are sashes. At the ends are projecting porches.	II
437 Lower Broughton Road; 53.50549°N 2.26717°W		c. 1840	A brick house with a Welsh slate roof, two storeys and three bays. The outer bays have shallow gables, and in the central bay is a recessed porch and a doorway with a segmental head. The windows are sashes. In the left return are a bow window with paired pilasters, and a cartouche.	II
451 Lower Broughton Road and coach house 53.50647°N 2.26621°W	—	c. 1840	The house and coach house are in brick with angle pilasters, a plain cornice, overhanging eaves on small brackets, and hipped Welsh slate roofs. The house has two storeys and three bays. In the central bay is a doorway with a canopy, and in the left bay is a full-height canted bay window. The windows are sashes. The coach house at the rear has an arched corbel table, inserted windows, and a pair of pointed niches facing the street.	II
453 Lower Broughton Road; 53.50669°N 2.26589°W	—	c. 1840	A stuccoed brick house with a moulded eaves cornice, and a hipped Welsh slate roof. There are two storeys and three bays. In the centre is a flat-roofed porch and a doorway that has an architrave with Tuscan pilasters. The right bay contains a full-height square bay window, and the windows are sashes with fretted blind canopies.	II
455 Lower Broughton Road; 53.50674°N 2.26580°W	—	c. 1840	A stuccoed brick house with a moulded eaves cornice and a Welsh slate roof. It is part of a terrace, set back from the road, with two storeys, a single bay at the front, and a long rear wing. The porch projects and has a doorway with round-headed side lights, and above it is a glazed gable. On the upper floor is a three-light sash window.	II
457 and 459 Broughton Road; 53.50682°N 2.26563°W	—	c. 1840	A pair of stuccoed brick houses with a sill band, a moulded eaves cornice, and a hipped Welsh slate roof. There are two storeys and six bays. The doorways have architraves with engaged columns and fanlights, and the windows are sashes in architraves.	II
466 Lower Broughton Road; 53.50745°N 2.26358°W	—	c. 1840	A brick house in Gothic style with a Welsh slate roof. There are two storeys with attics, a three-bay front, and a rear wing. The central bay projects slightly and has a gable with bargeboards and a pendant finial, and a projecting porch containing a doorway with a four-centred arched head. Above this is a three-light window and a lancet window in the gable. The ground floor windows are mullioned and transomed. The sides are gabled and contain canted bay windows.	II
Cliff House; 53.50703°N 2.26540°W	—	c. 1840	A stuccoed brick house with a sill band and a hipped tile roof. There are two storeys and a front of three bays at right angles to the road. Facing the road, to the right, is a porch with a pediment behind which is a verandah. The windows have been renewed, those on the ground floor with entablatures on console brackets, and those on the upper floor with architraves.	II
Park Villa; 53.50076°N 2.26107°W	—	c. 1840	A stuccoed brick house with a plain eaves cornice, overhanging eaves, and a hipped Welsh slate roof. There are two storeys with attics and a symmetrical front of three bays. The doorway is in the middle bay, the windows are sashes, and there are three gabled dormers.	II
Parkside; 53.50106°N 2.26148°W	—	c. 1840	A stuccoed house with overhanging eaves on moulded brackets and a Welsh slate roof. There are two storeys with attics, three bays, and a lower recessed two-storey single-bay extension to the left. In the centre is a Doric portico with a balustraded parapet and a doorway with a reeded architrave and a fanlight, above which are two small round-headed windows. The outer bays project slightly and contain sash windows, and on the roof are two gabled dormers.	II
Railway viaduct and retaining walls 53.48640°N 2.24719°W		c. 1840	This consists of two railway bridges and a linking retaining wall. The wall is in ashlar stone and has rusticated piers dividing it into bays containing arches with voussoirs, the piers breaking into the plain parapet. The bridges and their parapets are in cast iron, the parapet over Greengate has solid panels with moulded decoration, and that over Chapel Street has traceried openwork.	II
Scarr Wheel House; 53.50516°N 2.26745°W	—	c. 1840	A stuccoed brick house with a Welsh slate roof. It has two storeys, a front of three bays, and a parallel single-story rear range with pinnacles. In the middle bay is a porch with a four-centred arched doorway and a traceried parapet, above which is an oriel window. Over this bay and the right bay are gablets. The left bay projects forward, it is gabled, and contains sash windows and a sexfoil in the gable apex. On the right return are blind windows.	II
Albert Bridge; 53.48181°N 2.25308°W		1844	The bridge, which carries Bridge Street over the River Irwell, was designed by George W. Buck. It is in sandstone, and consists of a single segmental arch with voussoirs, pilaster terminals, and a moulded string course. In the centre of each parapet is a raised panel, and on the parapets are cast iron lamps.	II
Southern Railway Viaduct and Colonnade; 53.48291°N 2.25447°W		1844	The viaduct was designed by John Hawkshaw for the Liverpool and Manchester Railway. It consists of L-shaped girders with cast iron parapets carried on cast iron columns that have capitals decorated with Egyptian lotus flowers. The viaduct is otherwise plain except for the portion over Bridge Street which has sections divided by fluted pilasters with acanthus capitals, and a frieze.	II*
Salford Cathedral and Cathedral House; 53.48371°N 2.26107°W		1844–1848	A Roman Catholic cathedral designed by Matthew Hadfield in Gothic Revival style, with the south transept added in 1884. It is in stone with slate roofs, and has a cruciform plan. The cathedral consists of a nave with a clerestory, north and south aisles, north and south transepts, a chancel with aisles, and a steeple at the crossing. The steeple has a tower with angle buttresses, a quatrefoil parapet and a broach spire with four tiers of lucarnes. At the east end is a seven-light window, and polygonal turrets at the corners. The west end contains an arched doorway with a four-light window above and flanked by gabled buttresses with statues under canopies. Also at the west end are four octagonal turrets with crocketed pinnacles and spirelets. Adjoining the east side of the cathedral is the Cathedral House that has an L-shaped plan three storeys and three bays.	II*
Railings, wall, gate and gate piers, Salford Cathedral; 53.48345°N 2.26064°W	—	c. 1845	A stone wall runs along the cathedral precinct carrying wrought iron railings, with pilasters on the east side. To the left is a stone arched gateway, and stone gate piers with wrought iron gates.	II
Chaseley Field; 53.49399°N 2.30113°W	—	1848–1851	A detached house in sandstone with a Welsh slate roof, coped gables, and elaborate round chimney stacks. It has an irregular plan, two storeys, attics and cellars. The doorway has a four-centred arch and a hood mould, to the left is a mullioned window and to the right a full-height canted bay window. There are bay windows elsewhere, and dormers, all with sashes. At the rear is a tower-like bay with a pyramidal roof.	II
464 Lower Broughton Road; 53.50731°N 2.26391°W	—	c. 1850	A stone house in Italianate style, with quoins, a Welsh slate roof, and a brick extension at the rear. It has two storey with an attic, and three bays, the right bay projecting forward as a wing with a hipped roof. The central bay contains a porch with a rusticated surround and a round-headed doorway, above which is a balustraded balcony on console brackets. The ground floor windows have panelled architraves and voussoirs, and the upper floor window in the wing has a balustraded balcony.	II
388 and 390 Lower Broughton Road; 53.50311°N 2.26783°W	—	Mid-19th century	A pair of brick cottages incorporating earlier timber framing possibly from the 17th century. They have Welsh slate roofs, and consist of two parallel ranges joined by a lower wing. Features include gables with decorative bargeboards, square bay windows, ornamental hood moulds, a gabled dormer, and sash windows.	II
Boundary post, Flax Street; 53.48965°N 2.26015°W	—	Mid-19th century	The boundary post denotes the boundary between Salford and Broughton. It is in cast iron, and consists of a column 800 millimetres (31 in) tall with an upper face inscribed "DIVISION", and the lower face with the names of the two divisions.	II
St Paul's Church, Kersal; 53.51508°N 2.27243°W		1851–52	The church was damaged by fire in 1987, and in the rebuilding the clerestory was not replaced. The church is in stone, and consists of a nave, north and south aisles, a south porch, north and south transepts, a chancel with a north vestry, and a west steeple. The steeple has a three-stage tower with diagonal buttresses, a south doorway, a quatrefoil frieze, a corbel table, an embattled parapet, and a spire with lucarnes. At the southwest is a stair turret with a spirelet.	II
Royal Art Gallery, Museum and Library; 53.48511°N 2.27188°W		1852–1857	The building was extended in 1878 and in 1936–38. It is in brick with stone dressings, it has a Welsh slate roof, and is in Italian Renaissance style. The building has a range of four bays containing segmentally-arched windows that is flanked by pedimented wings. Each wing contains an arcaded portico with Corinthian columns, and a balcony with a balustraded parapet. Above is a modillion cornice, and a pediment containing arcading.	II
Boundary stone, Bury Old Road; 53.51791°N 2.25685°W	—	1853	The boundary stone is in ashlar and has a triangular plan and a chamfered top. It denoted the boundary between Prestwich and Salford, and the names of the townships are inscribed on the sides.	II
Boundary stone, Singleton Brook; 53.51278°N 2.28943°W		1853	The boundary stone marks the boundary between Prestwich and Salford. It is in ashlar with a triangular plan and a chamfered top. The top is inscribed "BOUNDARY STONE", and on the sides are inscribed the names of the towns.	II
Former Public Baths; 53.48752°N 2.25133°W	—	1855	A public swimming baths designed by Thomas Worthington with an Italianate front, later used for other purposes. It is in brick with stone dressings and a Welsh slate roof. The front is symmetrical with 13 bays and two storeys, the central five bays also have an attic storey. On the ground floor each bay contains a round-arched opening with voussoirs, containing a window or an entrance, and each has a console keystone carrying a cornice. On the upper floor are brick pilasters, windows in architraves, and coats of arms in panels at the ends. On the attic storey are round-headed windows, and at the rear the baths have glazed roofs.	II*
Lodge, Weaste Cemetery; 53.47944°N 2.30198°W	—	c. 1855	The lodge is in stone, and is now roofless and ruinous. It has a single storey, and has a plaque recording the opening and the extension of the cemetery.	II
St Paul's Church, Pendleton, church rooms, vicarage, walls and gates 53.48759°N 2.28423°W		1855–56	The church was designed by E. H. Shellard in Decorated style, but by the 1970s its condition had deteriorated, and it was restored and partly rebuilt by Stephen Dykes Bower, who also added church rooms with a vicarage above. The church is in stone and has slate roofs with stone coping and finials. The church consists of a nave, north and south aisles, a south porch, and a chancel. At the east end is a five-light window, and a bell turret with an octagonal arcaded top and a spire. A northeast porch leads to the church rooms and vicarage, which are at right angles, and a tall garden wall runs from it to enclose a square garden. The wall contains elaborate iron gates.	II
Statue of Queen Victoria; 53.48480°N 2.27217°W		1857	The statue was designed by Matthew Noble. It depicts Queen Victoria, and stands on a tall pedestal on steps.	II
Brotherton Memorial; 53.47732°N 2.30342°W		c. 1857	The memorial is in Weaste Cemetery, and commemorates Joseph Brotherton, Salford's first member of parliament. It is in sandstone, and in Gothic Revival style. The monument has a stepped plinth, a carved arcaded and buttressed base, an open arcaded and gabled octagon with the shafts carved as angels, and a gabled and crocketed spirelet.	II
Leighton House and Moor End; 53.51377°N 2.26782°W	—	c. 1857	A pair of brick semi-detached houses with sandstone dressings, a sill band, a moulded eaves cornice, and a Welsh slate roof. They have two storeys, attics and cellars, and each house has three bays. In the centre of each house is a projecting porch with Doric columns, and a doorway with an architrave and a fanlight. The outer bays project forward with pedimented gables. The windows are sashes, those on the ground floor with pilasters and entablatures, and those on the upper floor with architraves.	II
Tower of St George's Church; 53.49724°N 2.28236°W		1858	The church was designed by E. H. Shellard, but only the steeple remains. This is in sandstone, and in Decorated style. It consists of a three-stage tower with angle buttresses, a four-light west window, a clock face, and a broach spire with lucarnes. To the east is a plain moulded arch and the remains of the springing of the nave arcade.	II
The Maypole; 53.49289°N 2.28408°W		c. 1860	The former public house is in brick, the ground floor faced in stone, and with a Welsh slate roof, two storeys with attics, and five bays, the outer bays gabled. On the upper floor of the left bay are triple round-arched windows, and in the attic are stepped windows and a small balcony. In the right bay is a flat oriel window. The second bay contains a gabled porch, in the upper floor are windows with polychrome round heads, above them is a stone eaves parapet, and on the roof are two dormers with hipped roofs.	II
Greek Church of the Annunciation and presbytery 53.50642°N 2.26026°W		1860–61	A Greek Orthodox church in Classical style, the front is ashlar stone, and the rest in brick with ashlar dressings. On the front is a three-bay portico with Corinthian columns and a pediment with a modillion cornice and an apex cross. The bays on the front and sides of the church are divided by Corinthian pilasters, and the windows have pediments. At the rear is an apse, and a former presbytery in similar style.	II
Court House, gates and railings 53.48456°N 2.26336°W		1860–1865	The court house, later converted into offices, is in brick with the ground floor faced in rusticated stone and with stone dressings. It has quoins, a cornice above the ground floor, a sill band between the upper floors, and an eaves cornice. There are three storeys, a front of seven bays, and three bays on the sides. The doorways are round headed with fanlights and keystones. The windows are sashes, with round heads on the ground floor, on the middle floor they have segmental heads and pediments on consoles, alternately triangular and segmental, and on the top floor they are smaller with flat heads. To the left is a single-story bay, and recessed to the right is a two-storey block. In front is a low stone wall and gate piers and cast iron railings and gates.	II
Statue of Prince Albert; 53.48473°N 2.27170°W		1864	The statue was designed by Matthew Noble. It is in limestone, and depicts Prince Albert in academic dress with a pile of books at his feet. This stands on a tall pedestal on steps.	II
Central Railway Viaduct; 53.48306°N 2.25467°W		1865	The viaduct was built by the Lancashire and Yorkshire Railway to carry its line over New Bailey Street. It consists of L-section steel beams carried on cast iron Doric columns, and has a cast iron parapet with plain panels.	II
St Luke's Church; 53.48394°N 2.30275°W		1865	The church was designed by George Gilbert Scott in Gothic Revival style, and the chancel chapel was added in 1873–78. The church is in sandstone with a tiled roof, and consists of a nave with a clerestory, north and south aisles, a north gabled porch, a chancel with a polygonal apse and north and south chapels, and an embraced west steeple. The steeple has a tower with angle buttresses, and a broach spire with lucarnes.	II*
Girder bridge over River Irwell; 53.47802°N 2.25999°W	—	1860s	The bridge was built over the River Irwell by the London and North Western Railway to the north of an 1830 stone bridge to improve the approach to the goods warehouse of the former Liverpool Road Station. It has cast iron beams, columns and panels, and the abutments are in rusticated sandstone. In the midpoint of the north side is a giant cast iron column on a stone plinth.	II
14 and 16 Blackfriars Street; 53.48440°N 2.24908°W	—	1866	Offices and a warehouse with an ashlar ground floor and brick with stone dressings above. There are four storeys and ten bays. Above the ground floor is a cornice, between the other storeys are string courses, and at the top is a modillion cornice. In the centre is a round-arched doorway with marble shafts and a moulded architrave. The ground floor windows are sashes, between which are pilasters with foliate capitals. The windows on the upper floors have round or arched heads, and marble shafts with foliated capitals.	II
Church of the Ascension; 53.49475°N 2.26285°W		1869	The church, designed by J. Medland Taylor, is in brick with a Welsh slate roof. It consists of a nave with a clerestory, a western narthex with a porch, a chancel with transeptal chapels and an apsidal east end. Above the narthex is blind arcading and a large rose window. Along the sides are triple lancet windows.	II
Ashworth Memorial; 53.47733°N 2.30358°W	—	c. 1869	The monument commemorating members of the Ashworth family is in Weaste Cemetery. It is in stone, and has a stepped base, on which is a canopy with pointed gabled arches on columns surmounted by a spirelet with a cross finial. In the arches are inscribed stones.	II
Rusden Memorial; 53.47720°N 2.30355°W	—	c. 1870	The monument is in Weaste Cemetery, and commemorates members of the Rusden family. It is in stone, and has a stepped base, a canopy with trefoil arches on engaged shafts, and is surmounted by a stepped spirelet with a cross finial. In the arches are memorial stones.	II
Waterpark Hall (former Congregational Church, latterly United Reformed Church); 53.51564°N 2.25491°W		1872–1874	Originally a Congregational church, later converted for residential use, it was designed by S. W. Dawkes in Gothic Revival style. It is in stone with a Welsh slate roof and ridge cresting, and consists of a nave, north and south aisles, north and south transepts, a chancel with chapels, the south chapel with an apse, and a southeast steeple. The steeple has a three-stage tower that has buttresses with gablets, pinnacles, flying buttresses, and a spire with lucarnes.	II*
Wall, archways and gates, Town Hall; 53.48385°N 2.25932°W	—	Late 19th century	The archway and gates are at the entrance to the courtyard. The gate piers and the segmental arch to the right are in rusticated ashlar, and the gates are in cast iron. The piers have wreaths carved in low relief, the arch has a keystone, and above it is a modillion cornice.	II
St Clement's Church, Ordsall; 53.47236°N 2.27595°W		1877–78	The church, designed by Paley and Austin, is in red brick and terracotta with tiled roofs. It consists of a nave with a clerestory, north and south lean-to aisles, a north porch, and a chancel. Above the chancel is a flèche with a roof a Westmorland slate. Along the aisles are windows with pointed heads, and in the clerestory the windows are circular.	II
St Clement's Rectory; 53.47203°N 2.27576°W	—	1878	The rectory was designed by Paley and Austin and is in dark brick with dressings in red brick and has a tiled roof and sash windows. There are two storeys, an entrance front of three bays, and a later block to the left. The central bay is gabled and contains a gabled porch. To the left are lancet windows, and to the right the upper floor is recessed and the ground floor has a flat roof with a fretted parapet. On the side facing the street are a canted bay window and a dormer window.	II
King's Arms public house 53.48415°N 2.25601°W		1879	The public house is in red brick with stone dressings, a sill band, a bracketed cornice, a parapet, and a Welsh slate roof. It is on a corner site, with a semicircular plan, two storeys with an attic, six bays on Bloom Street, two on Sackville Street, and a curved bay on the corner. The round-headed doorway has short granite columns with foliate capitals, a hood mould, and the name in mosaic in the spandrels. Above it is a three-light window, and in the attic another three-light window and a balcony with a wrought ironwork on machicolations. At the top is a coped gable containing the royal coat of arms. The other windows are round-headed sashes, and on the roof are gabled dormers.	II
Former Manchester Swimming Baths; 53.48595°N 2.25211°W	—	1879–80	The swimming baths. later used for other purposes, are in brick with terracotta dressings and a partly glazed roof. The front is expressed as two storeys, and has a central pedimented gable. The central doorway has a four-centred arch, flanking pilasters, and above is a string course, a mullioned and transomed window, and a decorative terracotta panel with pilasters rising to finials. The other windows have round-arched heads.	II
Arlington House; 53.48437°N 2.25591°W		1880	Originally the offices for the Gas Board, it is in red brick on a stone plinth, with a corbelled eaves cornice and a steep Welsh slate roof. The building has two storeys with attics, and a symmetrical front of nine bays. The central bay contains a doorway with a semicircular head and engaged granite pilasters with foliated capitals. Above the doorway is an oriel window with a parapet and gargoyles. The bay rises to a tower with a machicolated parapet, bartizans, and a truncated pyramidal roof with iron brattishing. The outer bays project and have pyramidal roofs, and on the roof are gabled dormers.	II
Wallness Bridge; 53.49460°N 2.27014°W		1880	The bridge carries Frederick Road (B6196) over the River Irwell. There are two sandstone piers on each side at both ends; each has a frieze with acanthus decoration. Between the outer piers is a balustraded parapet with a stone sill and coping, and over the river is a latticed main span, the internal rivets decorated with rosettes.	II
21 Bolton Road; 53.49298°N 2.29356°W	—	c. 1880	A house in blue-buff brick with dressings in red brick, a corbelled string course, and a tiled roof. It has an irregular plan, two storeys and an attic. On the left is a projecting gabled wing, with diapering and tile hanging in the apex. To the right is a projecting porch with a hipped lean-to gabled roof. The windows are mixed, some being mullioned and transomed, some are sashes, and in the gable is a mullioned casement window.	II
Former Williams Deacons Bank; 53.48320°N 2.25824°W	—	c. 1880	The former bank is in brick with an ashlar-faced front, and has a Welsh slate roof with coped gables and wrought iron brattishing. There are three storeys with an attic and four bays. The doorways are in the outer bays with windows in the middle bays; all have semicircular heads. The windows on the upper floors have trefoil heads and between them are pilasters with foliate capitals. At the top is a string course on decorative brackets, a parapet, and two gabled dormers.	II
Irwell Street Bridge; 53.48058°N 2.25585°W		c. 1880	The bridge carries Irwell Street over the River Irwell. It has stone piers and abutments, between which are paired arched trusses with lattice-work cross bracing. The road bed is carried on cast iron beams, and the parapet, also in cast iron, has panels with solid latticework. There is decoration with rosettes over the rivets and on the ends of the beams, and at the ends of the bridge are panels with the coats of arms of Salford and Manchester in low relief.	II
Manchester Tennis and Racquet Club; 53.48609°N 2.25252°W		c. 1880	The club for playing real tennis and other racquet sports designed by G. T. Redmayne, and with a squash court added in 1925–26. It is in red brick with terracotta dressings and has a roof partly slated and partly glazed. The building has a T-shaped plan, with the courts across the rear, and an entrance wing extending towards the street. The central part of the entrance block is gabled with three storeys, and contains a round-headed doorway with a round-headed window to the left, an arcade of round-headed windows above and a blind window on the top floor. To the right is a two-storey gabled block with a three-window arcade on the ground floor and a pair of flat-headed windows under an arch with terracotta panelling in the tympanum. To the left is a single-story flat-roofed block with windows and a stepped parapet.	II*
Ukrainian Catholic Church, walls and gate piers 53.51460°N 2.24797°W		1881	Originally a Sunday school, it was converted into a church in 1954. It is built in buff Kerridge sandstone with a slate roof, and is in Decorated Gothic style. The church consists of a nave, north and south aisles, an apse and a narthex, and on the roof is a flèche. The grounds are enclosed on the east and north sides by a stone boundary wall, with chamfered and polygonal gate piers at the entrance.	II
10 and 12 Blackfriars Street; 53.48461°N 2.24929°W	—	1884	Offices and a warehouse, the main block is faced in ashlar and is in Flemish Renaissance style. There are five storeys with an attic and five unequal bays, the bays separated by octagonal piers. The doorway has a segmental head, a traceried fanlight, and a steep pediment. In the outer bays are two-storey oriel windows, and most of the windows are mullioned and transomed. At the top is a small balcony, a pedimented Dutch gable and heraldic finials. To the left is a later bay with a single-storey entrance containing a four-centred doorway, behind which is a recessed three-storey brick block.	II
Black Friar public house 53.48660°N 2.25351°W		1886	The public house is in red brick on a chamfered plinth, with sandstone dressings, three string courses, and a slate roof. It has an L-shaped plan, two storeys with cellars and attics, and three gables, the upper parts of which are tile-hung. There are two doorways, one with a moulded surround and an ogee head, and the other with a swan-neck pediment. Some of the windows are sashes, in the gables are mullioned windows, there is an oriel window, and a flat-roofed dormer.	II
Former Brunswick Wesleyan Schools; 53.49099°N 2.28281°W	—	1887	The school, later offices, is in stone with a Welsh slate roof, and is in Gothic style. It is on a corner site, and has two storeys. On the corner is a tower with chamfered angles containing a doorway with a pointed head, and on the top is a timber lantern with gablets and a spire. The front facing Broad Street is gabled, and contains pilasters and large windows on the upper floor in an arch containing a circular window in the spandrel. On the Higham View front are six bays, two of them gabled. Most of the windows are mullioned and transomed.	II
Pendleton Co-operative Industrial Society Buildings; 53.49304°N 2.28366°W		1887	The building was extended in 1903. It is in red brick with dressings in terracotta and stone, and Welsh slate roofs. There are three storeys and fronts of four and five bays. The bays are divided by rusticated piers on the ground floor and pilasters above, and at the top of each bay is a pedimented gable. The first floor windows have segmental heads, and those on the top floor are mullioned and transomed. Above the entrance on the north front is a tower with an octagonal lantern and a domed roof. On the west side is an octagonal turret, and on the curved corner bay are a balustraded parapet with urn finials, and a clock near the top.	II
Railings, walls, gate piers and gates, Weaste Cemetery; 53.47956°N 2.30156°W	—	1887	The stone walls flank the drive and the entrance to the cemetery and carry cast iron railings with spiked ball finials. The gate piers flank the main and pedestrian gates, which are in cast iron.	II
62 Chapel Street; 53.48504°N 2.24901°W		1888–89	Originally a police station, later converted into offices, it is in red brick with terracotta dressings and a Welsh slate roof. The building is on a corner site with a triangular plan, a curved corner, and a single storey. Along the sides is a continuous arcade with pilasters and foliate capitals, some arches containing casement windows. The main doorway has a cornice hood on consoles. Along the top is a parapet with balusters and piers at intervals, and on the ridge is brattishing. Above the corner is an octagonal spirelet with an iron corona and a finial.	II
Mark Addy Memorial; 53.47720°N 2.30234°W		1890	The monument in Weaste Cemetery commemorates Mark Addy who rescued many people from the River Irwell. It is in polished granite, and consists of an obelisk on a stepped base. On the obelisk is a medallion, and on the base is an inscription.	II
6 Bloom Street and Salford House; 53.48413°N 2.25548°W		1890–1894	This originated as a model lodging house for men, and has been converted into flats. It is in red brick and terracotta with a Welsh slate roof. The building has a U-shaped plan with three storeys and attics, and a single-storey central entrance. The entrance has a doorway flanked by windows, all of which are round-headed, and above them is a moulded string course, a parapet and a gable containing a heraldic panel. The wings have corbelled cornices and gables. To the left is the former manager's house (No. 6), with three storeys, a gable, and sash windows.	II
Former Sacred Trinity Parish Schools; 53.48590°N 2.25190°W		1891	The school, designed by James Medland Taylor, has been converted for other uses. It is in red brick and terracotta with string courses, a stepped eaves cornice, and slate roofs. There are three storeys and a tall basement, and six bays. The entrance is in the right bay with a doorway and window recessed under a round arch, and above is a two-light window and an oculus. The basement windows have round heads, those on the lower two floors have segmental heads, and on the top floor are gabled half-dormers.	II
Monument to Oliver Heywood; 53.48562°N 2.27712°W		c. 1892	The monument commemorates Oliver Heywood, a banker and local philanthropist. It is in polished granite, and consists of an obelisk on a stone base with radial buttresses surmounted by volutes. On the monument is a bronze medallion in low relief, and on the base is an inscription.	II
Northern Railway Viaduct; 53.48319°N 2.25476°W		1894	The viaduct was built by the Lancashire and Yorkshire Railway to carry its line over New Bailey Street. It has a cast iron deck with some steel supports, and is carried by three cast iron Doric columns. The parapet has fluted pilasters, panels with moulded details, and a swag and Greek Key frieze.	II
Trafford Road Bridge; 53.46567°N 2.28416°W		c. 1894	A swing bridge carrying the northbound lanes of Trafford Road (A5063 road) over the Manchester Ship Canal. It is in wrought iron with abutments in brick and stone. The bridge is constructed with lattice girders by the roadway joined at the top by smaller lattice girders. The bridge pivots on a turntable at the north end.	II
Salford Education Offices; 53.48352°N 2.26026°W		1895	The offices are faced in yellow terracotta on a granite plinth, they have a Welsh slate roof, and are in French Renaissance style. There are three storeys with a high basement, and ten bays, each containing mullioned and transomed windows and divided by Ionic pilasters. In the centre is a round-headed doorway with engaged Tuscan pilasters and a balcony on moulded console brackets, above which are decorative panels. There is a two-storey oriel window in the left bay, and a doorway with an enriched entablature in the right bay. At the top of the left bay is a shaped gable with pinnacles, at the top of the right bay is a tower with a cupola, the central bay is surmounted by a lantern with a wind vane and between them is an openwork parapet.	II
Gazebo, Peel Building; 53.48485°N 2.27249°W	—	c. 1895	The gazebo was designed to conceal a ventilation duct from the former technical college. It is in terracotta and has a square plan and a single storey. In each face is a round-headed arch, on the corners are octagonal turrets with ogee domes, and it has an ogee cupola roof with a finial.	II
Chesters Salford Brewery; 53.48465°N 2.25396°W		1896	The brewery was built for Threlfalls Brewery Company, and has since been altered and used for other purposes. It is in red brick with stone dressings and Welsh slate roofs, and has a T-shaped plan with a tower at the junction. To the northeast of the tower is the maturing house, and along Cook Street are offices, a copper room and a boiler house. The tower has five storeys and sides of five and four bays. At the top is a corbel table, a slotted parapet, and a hipped roof with lunettes in dormers and decorative finials.	II
Peel Building; 53.48517°N 2.27306°W		1896	The building originated as the Royal Technical College, and later became part of Salford University. It is in Ruabon brick and terracotta, it has a tiled roof, and is in Renaissance style. There are three storeys and the front is symmetrical, with a central block of three bays. The central round-arched doorway has paired Ionic columns, an entablature and a balustrades parapet. The windows are mullioned and transomed, and other features include gables, some shaped, stair turrets with ogee domes, and terracotta panels containing sculptures relating to art and science.	II
Charles Hallé Memorial; 53.47686°N 2.30190°W		c. 1896	The memorial in Weaste Cemetery commemorates Charles Hallé, the founder of The Hallé Orchestra, and members of his family. It is in stone, and consists of an elaborately carved pedestal surmounted by a cross. On the front is a bronze plaque with a head and shoulders profile of Charles Hallé. On the cornice of the pedestal is foliage decoration, on the base of the cross are roundels containing carvings of the Four Evangelists, and on the cross is floral decoration.	II
Former Nurses' Home; 53.48435°N 2.27335°W		1897	Originally a nurses' home, later converted into a library, it is in brick with terracotta dressings, applied timber framing to the gables, and has a tiled roof. There are three storeys and an irregular plan. The entrance consists of a flat-roofed porch and a round-headed doorway flanked by moulded pilasters, above which is a balustraded parapet. In the left return are bay windows with decorative parapets. The windows are sashes.	II
Former Victoria Theatre; 53.49129°N 2.25932°W	—	1899	The theatre, later used for other purposes, was designed by Bertie Crewe. It is in red brick and red terracotta with a stuccoed ground floor and a hipped Welsh slate roof. There are two storeys and five bays, the bays divided by Ionic pilasters. On the ground floor are flattened arches, and on the upper floors are square-headed windows.	II
Sports Pavilion; 53.50223°N 2.26907°W	—	1899	The pavilion is red brick with some stone dressings and a hipped tiled roof. It has two storeys and a rectangular plan, with a half-verandah at the front and a square tower in the southeast corner. The eaves overhang to the front and are carried on timber columns with Ionic capitals. The tower has a half timbered upper floor and a pyramidal roof with a weathervane.	II
Church of St Ignatius of Antioch, Ordsall; 53.47619°N 2.27485°W		1900	The church was designed by Darbyshire and Smith in Romanesque style. It is in brick with terracotta dressings and roofs of slate and concrete tiles. The church consists of a nave with a clerestory, lean-to north and south aisles, a chancel with an apse, chapels and a south vestry, and a detached southwest tower. The tower has four stages, a west doorway, and a pyramidal roof with a cross finial. On the church are decorative friezes, arcades and tympani.	II
Burnett Memorial; 53.47722°N 2.30339°W	—	c. 1900	The memorial is in Weaste Cemetery and commemorates members of the Burnett family. It is in stone, and has a stepped base, an openwork canopy with granite columns, pointed arches, and crocketed gablets, and is surmounted by a spire with a cross finial.	II
Eagle Inn and attached dwelling 53.48731°N 2.25117°W		1902	The public house and dwelling to the left are in red brick on a deep plinth, with terracotta dressings and a slate roof with decorative ridge tiles. Both have two storeys and a string course, the pub has an L-shaped plan, and the dwelling a rectangular plan. The pub house is in Edwardian Baroque style with a symmetrical front of three bays. The central doorway has a fanlight and is flanked by recessed canted bay windows. Above the doorway is a terracotta plaque with an eagle and the name, and this is flanked by mullioned windows. At the top is a parapet, a shaped gable and ball finials. The dwelling has a door with a fanlight, and mullioned windows.	II
Salford Lads' Club; 53.47688°N 2.27433°W		1903	The social club is in red brick with terracotta dressings and a slate roof. It is on a corner site, with an irregular rectangular plan, and has two and three storeys. The west front has five bays, the central three gabled. The windows are mullioned and transomed, those on the ground floor with semicircular heads, and in the middle bay is an oriel window. The left bay is a tower with a domed cupola, a pierced parapet, and an oriel window. On the corner is a canted bay with three round-headed entrances. The north front has seven bays, round-headed windows on the ground floor, mullioned and transomed windows on the upper floor and five Dutch gables.	II*
Lancashire Fusiliers Memorial; 53.48305°N 2.26409°W		1905	The memorial commemorates the members of the Lancashire Fusiliers who served in the Boer War, and it was designed by George Frampton. The memorial consists of the bronze figure of a soldier standing on a tall stone plinth on which is an inscription and the insignia of the regiment.	II
Halton Bank School; 53.49268°N 2.29272°W	—	1906	The school, later converted into apartments, is in red brick with yellow terracotta dressings and a Welsh slate roof. The main block has two storeys and a U-shaped plan. The central part is gabled and has a small cupola with a domed roof. The outer wings project forward and have towers on the inner corners, with angle pilasters, parapets, and small spirelets. Outside the towers are projecting porches with segmental heads and parapets. At the corner of the left tower is a canted bay window. The right tower links to a projecting range with three gables.	II
119, 121 and 123 Gerald Road and 1 Littleton Road; 53.49726°N 2.27713°W		1909	A group of shops, originally the butchery department of the local Co-operative Society, with Classical and Arts and Crafts features. They are in red brick with dressings in glazed brick and in yellow and green faience. There is a hipped tiled roof with ridge cresting and finials. The building has a triangular plan, two storeys, and a polygonal tower on the angle of the streets. The tower has a frieze, a cornice on brackets, and an ogee cupola. On the angle of the roof is a leaded lantern with a loured cupola. Other features include round-arched windows with voussoirs and keystones, some in arcades, pilasters, and a panel with wording in low relief.	II
Coach and Horses public house 53.48193°N 2.30401°W		1913	The former public house is in red brick on a stone plinth, with stone dressings, string courses, a dentil cornice, and a tile roof. It has two storeys, a front and a right return of three bays, and a flat-roofed bay at the rear. On the front the central doorway has pilasters, a segmental pediment on consoles, and a recessed tympanum containing carving, and there is a similar doorway in the right return. On the ground floor are recessed canted bay windows with curved stone heads. The upper floor has windows with voussoirs and keystones.	II
Independent Chapel; 53.48352°N 2.25775°W		1915	Originally Salford Cinema, later used as a chapel, it is in brick with facing in faience and roughcast. The building has a half-hipped Welsh slate roof, its front is in Baroque style, and is expressed as two storeys. The central part has a segmental pediment, below it is flanked by rusticated pilasters, and it contains a doorway, two round windows with moulded surrounds, and festoons. In the outer parts are oval windows with similar moulding, and the corner is curved containing a doorway above which are festoons, an elaborate balustrade, and an open cupola carried on six columns with decorated capitals.	II
Andrew Knowles and Sons Collieries War Memorial; 53.50832°N 2.31306°W	—	1919	The war memorial, designed by Charles Archibald Nicholson, is to the memory of the employees of the collieries of Andrew Knowles and Sons lost during the First World War, and stands in a memorial garden at a road junction. The memorial is in Derbyshire sandstone, and is 18 feet (5.5 m) tall. It has a base of four steps and a plinth with an octagonal top. On this is a slightly tapering octagonal shaft, and a Greek cross with flared ends. Behind the memorial is a curved wall, the central section is in ashlar, flanked by pillars, and has an entablature with flat coping. On the entablature is an inscription, and below are eight plaques containing the names of the employees lost in the war.	II
St Paul's War Memorial; 53.48773°N 2.28475°W	—	1921	The war memorial stands in the churchyard of St Paul's Church, Pendleton. It was damaged in 1995, and rebuilt and restored in 2008. The memorial is in sandstone, and consists of a floriated cross-head on a tapering octagonal shaft. The shaft is on an octagonal plinth with a moulded foot, on a base of two steps. On the plinth is an inscription and the names of those lost in the First World War.	II
Winton War Memorial; 53.49102°N 2.36912°W	—	1921	The war memorial is in the churchyard of St Mary Magdalene's Church. It is in stone, and consists of a Celtic cross on an angled plinth on a base of two steps. On three sides of the plinth are panels with inscriptions and the names of those lost in both World Wars.	II
War memorial, Albion Place; 53.48406°N 2.27211°W		1922	The war memorial is in white ashlar stone and consists of a pylon on a stepped base with volutes. It has inscriptions commemorating those lost in both World Wars, carved wreaths, the word "EGYPT", and in the top is a sphinx.	II
Dock Office; 53.47196°N 2.28299°W		c. 1925	The office building is in rendered brick on a steel frame. It has an E-shaped plan, and three storeys with a full attic storey. The central feature is a projecting pylon-like bay containing an entrance, a full-height arched window and a stepped parapet. This is flanked by nine bays on each side with a cornice above, and two rear wings, on the east with nine bays and on the west with eleven. The windows have steel frames, and between them are moulded aprons.	II
Entrance to Dock Office; 53.47177°N 2.28266°W		c. 1925	The entrance is in concrete and consists of a flat arch between pylons decorated with incised panels and motifs with the appearance of ships' keels. To the right is a smaller pedestrian gate with a segmental arch. The gates have been replaced by a screen.	II
Synagogue; 53.51416°N 2.24741°W	—	1928–29	The synagogue is in brick with ashlar facings and stone dressings, and has a hipped Welsh slate roof with a central lantern. It has a rectangular plan with a segmental and domed protrusion towards the road containing the Ark. The entrance is on the southeast front and has a rusticated plinth and stripped down Corinthian pilasters. Lower and to the west are offices, a hall and a staircase block.	II
K6 telephone kiosk, Albion Place; 53.48404°N 2.27159°W		1935	A K6 type telephone kiosk, designed by Giles Gilbert Scott. Constructed in cast iron with a square plan and a dome, it has three unperforated crowns in the top panels.	II
Mural at former Cromwell Secondary School; 53.49613°N 2.27595°W		1960	The mural on the north wall of a former school, the rest of which has been demolished, is by Alan Boyson and entitled The Tree of Knowledge. It is in mixed media, including ceramics, concrete, tiles, and pebbles, and measures about 7 metres (23 ft) by 7 metres (23 ft). The mural depicts a stylised tree with birds, including an owl, and flowers.	II
Three totem sculptures, University of Salford; 53.48833°N 2.27911°W		1966	Three totem sculptures by William Mitchell in concrete with pebble aggregate and coloured tiles. They consist of columns made from four blocks each and are between 5.6 metres (18 ft) and 6 metres (20 ft) tall. Each has a different design and colour, and they include human features, swirls, squares and shells, and applied mosaic tiles.	II
War memorial, Sacred Trinity Church; 53.4848°N 2.2503°W		Undated	A granite war memorial in the churchyard commemorating local servicemen who died during the First World War, together with one of the most famous civilian casualties of the conflict, Edith Cavell.	II
