= Peel Building =

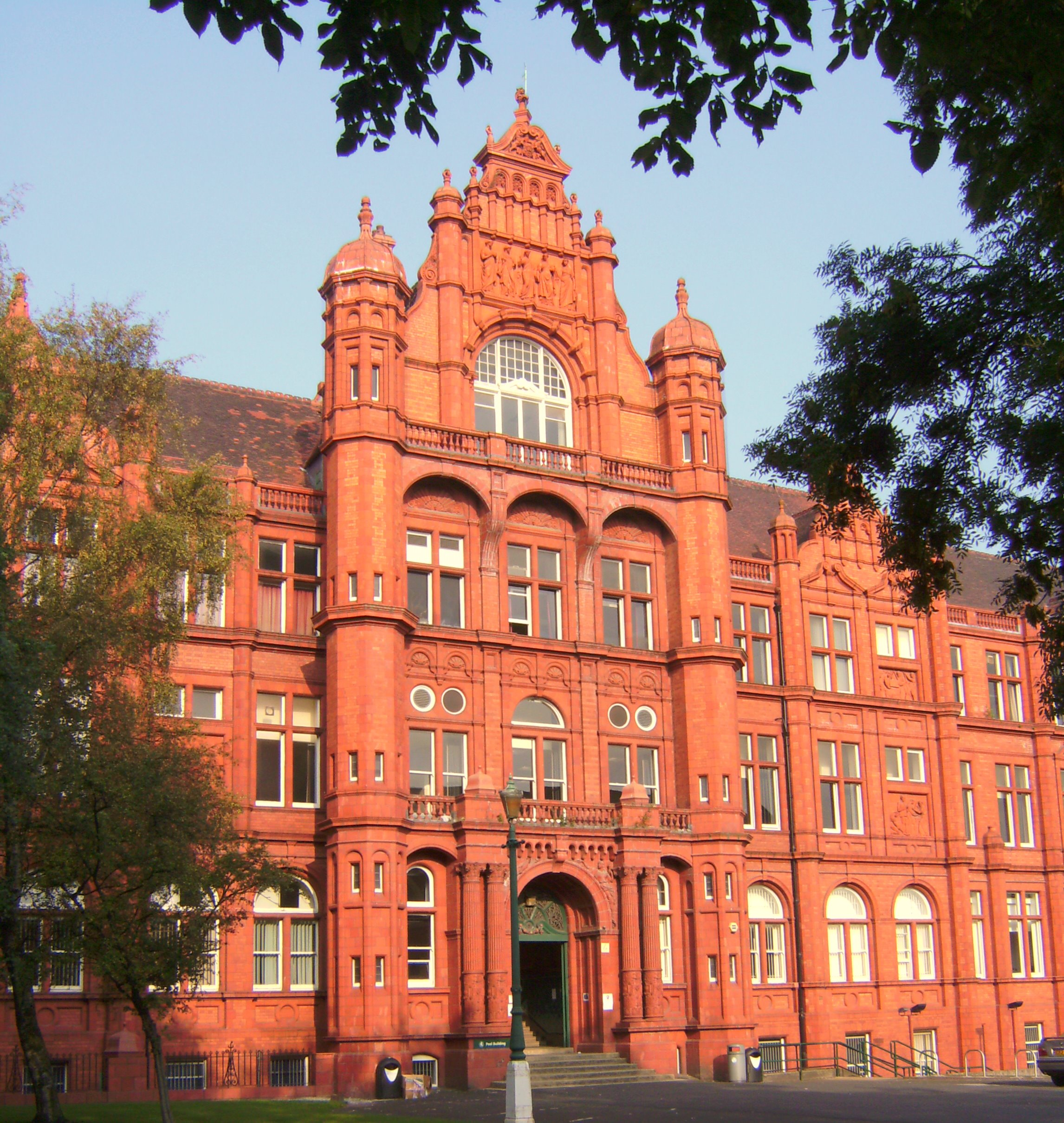
- Peel Building
- Interactive map of the Peel Building area
- Former names: Salford Royal Technical Institute

General information
- Type: Academic
- Architectural style: Redbrick
- Location: Salford
- Coordinates: 53.48516°N 2.273238°W
- Completed: 1896; 130 years ago
- Owner: University of Salford

Design and construction
- Architect: Henry Lord

The Peel Building is a building at the University of Salford located in their Peel Park campus adjacent to the A6 Crescent and is the university's oldest building in current use.

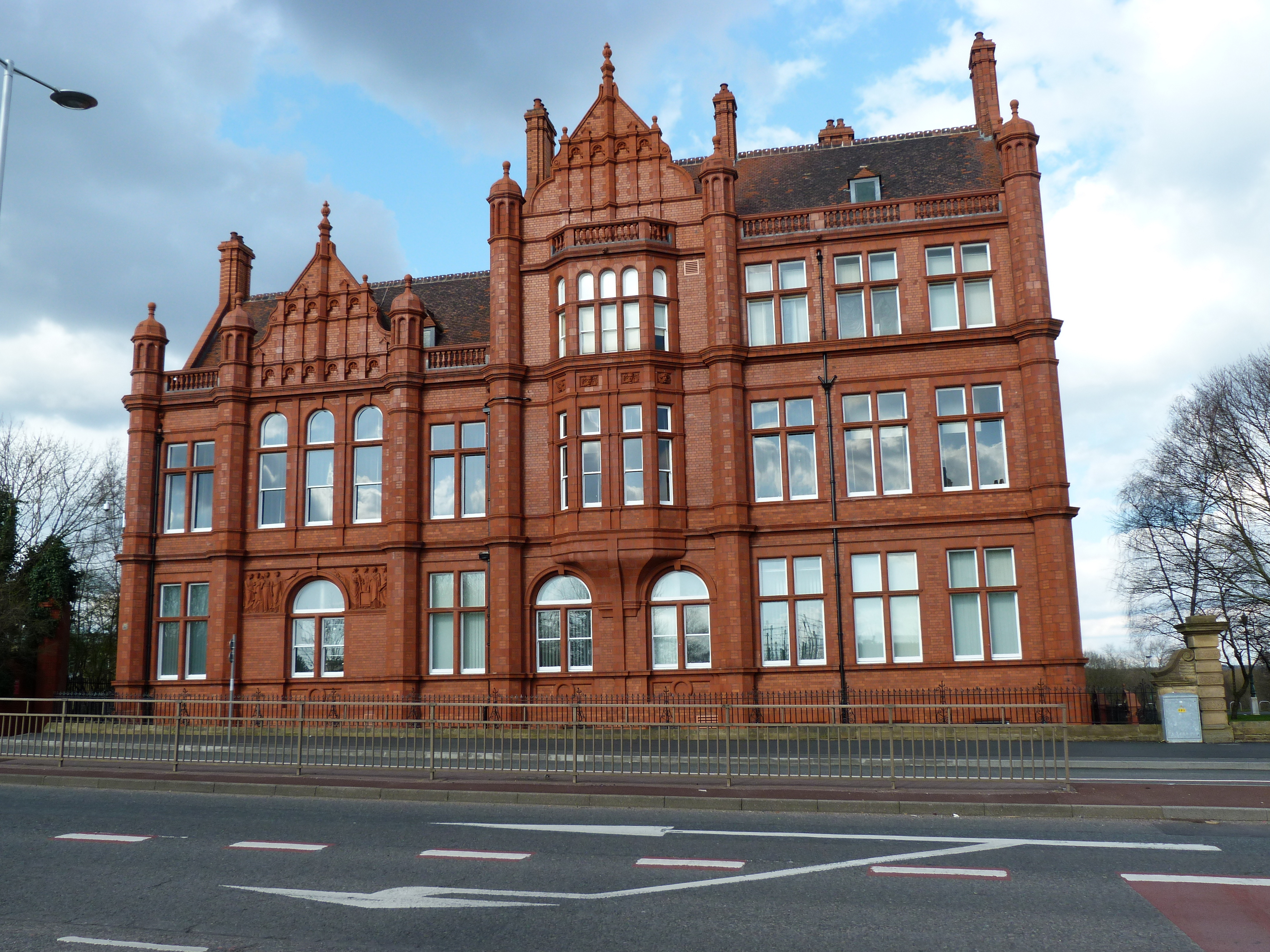
Peel Building viewed from Working Class Library

== History ==
Originally the home for Salford Royal Technical Institute it was opened by the then Duke and Duchess of York (latterly George V and Queen Mary) in 1896. The building was renamed Peel Building in 1967 as the Royal College of Advanced Technology (as it had evolved into) was granted university status.

== Listed building ==
Like several buildings in the close area such as Salford Museum and Art Gallery and Working Class Movement Library it is Grade II listed.

== Present day ==
The building still is in use and is currently home to the Universities' School of Environment and Life Sciences.

== See also ==
- Listed buildings in Salford, Greater Manchester
