= The Maypole, Salford =

Listed former pub in England

The Maypole
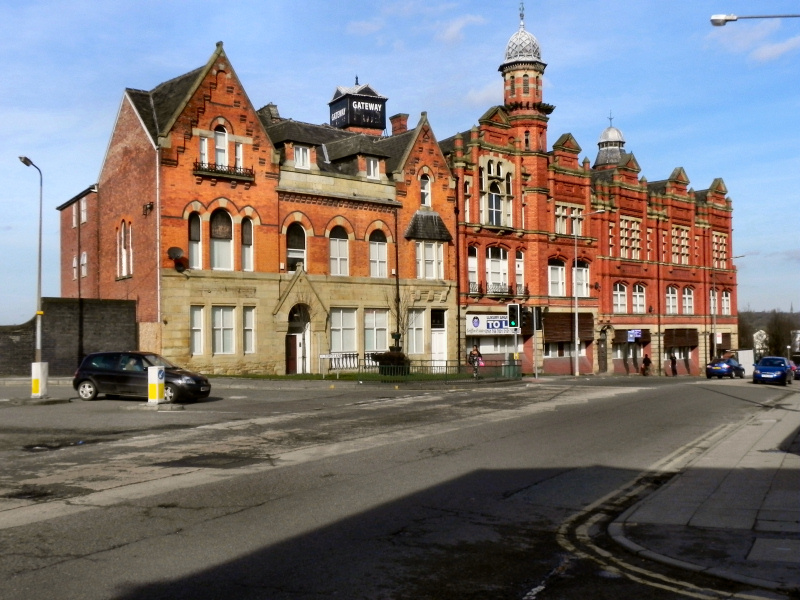
- The former pub in 2011, on the left

- Location within Greater Manchester
- Former names: Maypole Hotel

General information
- Status: Converted to residential use
- Type: Public house (former)
- Architectural style: Gothic
- Location: 9 Broughton Road, Pendleton, Greater Manchester, England
- Coordinates: 53.4929°N 2.2840°W
- Year built: c. 1860; 166 years ago
- Closed: 1990s (as a pub)
- Client: James Addison

Design and construction
- Architect: James Redford
- Designations

Listed Building – Grade II
- Official name: The Maypole
- Designated: 18 February 1998
- Reference no.: 1386098

The Maypole is a Grade II listed former public house on Broughton Road in Pendleton, an inner-city district of Salford, England. Built in around 1860 in a Gothic style, it was designed by the Manchester architect James Redford and originally opened as a hotel named after a maypole that stood beside the site. It remained in pub use into the late 20th century before closing in the early 1990s and was later converted to residential use.

== History ==
The building was constructed in around 1860, according to its official listing. (Note: Other sources give construction dates of 1858–1861 or 1875.) While the listing does not specify its original use, a contemporary source records that it was built as a hotel. It was designed by the Manchester architect James Redford for James Addison. The hotel was named after a maypole that stood beside the site, raised by local subscription to replace Pendleton's earlier pole.

The 1893 Ordnance Survey map shows it in use as the Maypole Hotel, while the 1922 edition marks it as a public house without an attributed name.

According to a local history blog, anecdotal recollections suggest that the pub closed in the early 1990s. On 18 February 1998, The Maypole was designated a Grade II listed building. The building was subsequently converted to residential use, but the date of the conversion is not documented.

== Architecture ==
The building is constructed in brick with stone detailing and has a Welsh slate roof. It has two floors and five bays, with gabled ends at each side, and is designed in a Gothic style. The lower level is faced in stone. The main entrance sits just left of the centre within a small gabled porch. To its left is a three‑part mullioned window; to its right are two later window openings, with a secondary doorway beneath the right‑hand gable.

On the upper floor, the right‑hand gable contains an oriel window and a round opening set high in the gable. The central section has three arched windows with patterned brickwork above them, topped by a stone parapet with corbelling and two small dormers with hipped gables. The left‑hand gable has a group of three round‑arched windows with coloured stone detailing, and above them stepped openings with a small cast‑iron balcony supported on brackets. Both gables include shallow decorative corbelling and stone coping. The end walls have shortened chimney stacks.

== See also ==
- Listed buildings in Salford
- Listed pubs in Greater Manchester
