= Public Baths, Salford =

Listed building in Greater Manchester, England

Public Baths
- Location within Greater Manchester
- Alternative names: Greengate Public Baths; Collier Street Baths

General information
- Status: Derelict
- Type: Public baths (former)
- Location: Collier Street, Salford, England
- Coordinates: 53.48292°N 2.25446°W
- Year built: 1855; 171 years ago

Design and construction
- Architect: Thomas Worthington

Listed Building – Grade II*
- Official name: Former Public Baths
- Designated: 18 January 1980
- Reference no.: 1386123

The former Public Baths (also known as Greengate Public Baths or Collier Street Baths) is a Grade II* listed building on Collier Street in Salford, England. It was designed by Thomas Worthington and built in 1855 as one of the region's earliest public bathing facilities. After closing as baths in the late 19th century, it served as a warehouse for much of the 20th century before falling into disuse. As of 2025, it remains on Historic England's Heritage at Risk Register, rated in very bad condition with no agreed solution.

== History ==
The baths were designed by architect Thomas Worthington and constructed by the Manchester and Salford Wash Baths & Laundry Company in 1855, during a period of significant urban growth in Salford driven by the textile industry. Public baths were introduced to provide sanitary facilities for working-class communities who lacked access to private bathing amenities. The Collier Street baths were among the first in Salford and were considered advanced for their time, offering separate facilities for men and women.

By the late 19th century, after 25 years, the building had ceased functioning as public baths and was repurposed as a warehouse. It remained in commercial use for much of the 20th century before becoming disused.

On 18 January 1980, the former public baths was designated a Grade II* listed building.

In 2024 the developer Renaker submitted a planning application to Salford City Council to restore the building as part of its wider Greengate regeneration scheme. The plans include structural stabilisation and essential conservation works, such as fabric repairs, installation of a new roof, and the addition of staircases to access the mezzanine level. The interior is proposed to be divided into north and south pool halls and returned to a shell condition to allow for future fit-out once an occupier is identified. Suggested uses include a food hall or other community-oriented spaces, with the potential reinstatement of a swimming pool considered if feasible. In July 2026, the council stated that no date had yet been set for councillors to consider the planning application.

The building forms a group with the Eagle Inn opposite, built in an Edwardian Baroque style and listed at Grade II.

== Architecture ==
The building is constructed of brick with stone dressings and a Welsh slate roof. It is two storeys in height with a central five-bay attic storey and a symmetrical 13-window range. Entrances are located in the fourth bay on each side; one is now blocked, while the other retains paired panelled doors. The ground floor features a continuous range of stone-dressed arcading, with stepped voussoirs over round-arched recesses that house entrances and windows. Each arch incorporates a console keystone supporting a cornice above, and the corners are defined by stressed quoins.

The upper storey is articulated by brick pilasters with plain stone capitals, and the windows are set within stone architraves in shallow recesses. Blind panels on either side display coats of arms. The central attic storey contains an arcaded range of five round-arched windows divided by brick and stone pilasters, with paired brackets supporting sharply overhanging eaves. End wall stacks are positioned on this projecting storey and at the outer gable ends.

To the rear are the former bath halls, which retain twin-span part-glazed roofs. Internally, the bath areas survive with roofs supported by rare early laminated timber trusses. Semi-circular arch-braces spring from cantilevered iron consoles to support the principal rafters, and the spandrels are infilled with wooden cross-bracing. The structure is considered an important example of early purpose-built public baths.

== Heritage at Risk Register ==
In late 2014, the Victorian Society named the former Public Baths among its top ten most endangered buildings in England and Wales.

As of 2025, the building is listed on Historic England's Heritage at Risk Register with its condition rated as "very bad" and with "no solution agreed".

== See also ==
- Grade II* listed buildings in Greater Manchester
- Listed buildings in Salford
