= King's Arms, Salford =

Listed pub in England

King's Arms
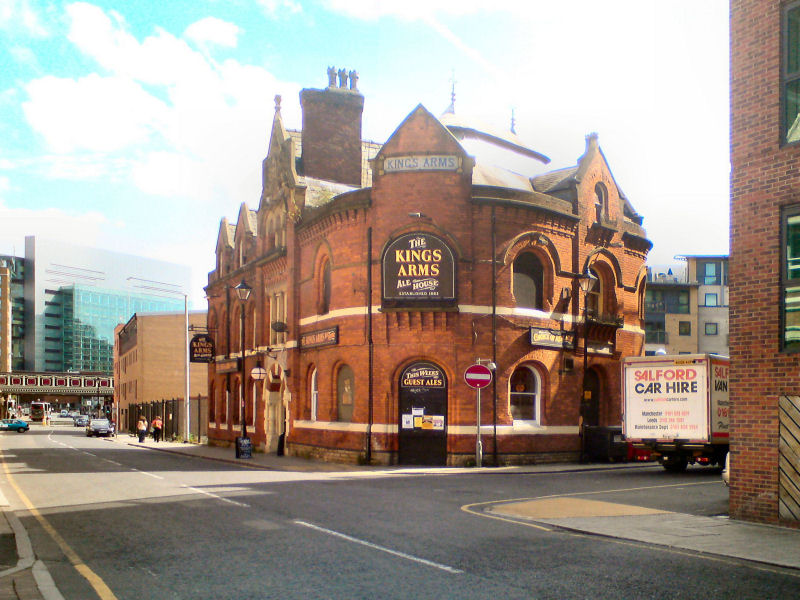
- The pub in 2010

- Location within Greater Manchester
- Alternative names: Kings Arms

General information
- Type: Public house
- Architectural style: Gothic
- Location: 11 Bloom Street, Salford, England
- Coordinates: 53.4841°N 2.2559°W
- Year built: 1879; 147 years ago

Design and construction
- Designations

Listed Building – Grade II
- Official name: Kings Arms public house
- Designated: 1 December 1987
- Reference no.: 1386087

Website
- kingsarmssalford.com

The King's Arms is a Grade II listed public house on Bloom Street in Salford, England. Built in 1879 in a Gothic style, it replaced an earlier King's Arms that stood on the opposite side of the road and was licensed from 1807. In the early 2010s it gained a reputation as a hub for artistic activity, including during a lease held by musician Paul Heaton, and it now incorporates a theatre space that hosts a programme of performances and related events.

== History ==
An earlier King's Arms stood on the opposite side of the road and was licensed from 1807. The present building, constructed in 1879 according to its official listing, replaced that earlier public house. The 1922 and 1933 Ordnance Survey maps mark the building as a pub, but do not attribute a name. On 1 December 1987, the King's Arms was designated a Grade II listed building.

From 2011 to 2015 the pub was run under a lease held by musician Paul Heaton, during which time it developed a growing reputation as a hub for artistic activity. As of 2026, the King's Arms incorporates a theatre space that hosts a programme of performances and related events.

== Architecture ==
=== Exterior ===
The building is constructed in red brick with stone detailing and has a conical slate roof that includes glazed sections and two small spire‑like features. It is designed in a Gothic style and occupies a semi-circular plot on a corner.

It has two storeys with an attic above. The side facing Bloom Street includes six first‑floor sash windows with rounded tops, set within linked stone features and resting on a continuous stone ledge. The ground floor has similar openings but is built in rougher stonework with a blue‑brick base. The main entrance sits within a projecting bay and has a rounded doorway framed by short granite columns with carved capitals. Above the doorway is a decorative panel with the name "King's Arms" in mosaic, and a group of three windows above that. Higher up is a band of patterned brickwork and a small stone balcony with iron railings, supported by projecting stonework beneath three attic windows with arched heads. The gable above is shaped to frame a decorative carving of the Royal Arms.

A former doorway on the curved corner is now filled in. Above it is a window with a small balcony, and another gable containing a mosaic of the "King's Arms". The side facing Sackville Street has three windows, a central doorway, and a gabled dormer above.

=== Interior ===
The entrance corridor passes a snug on the left, with the main lounge and bar to the right in an oval-shaped room, furnished with a bench running around most of the perimeter. A further corridor leads out to the garden.

== See also ==
- Listed buildings in Salford
- Listed pubs in Greater Manchester
