= St Philip's Church, Salford =

Coordinates: 53.4840°N 2.2631°W

Saint Philip's Chapel Street
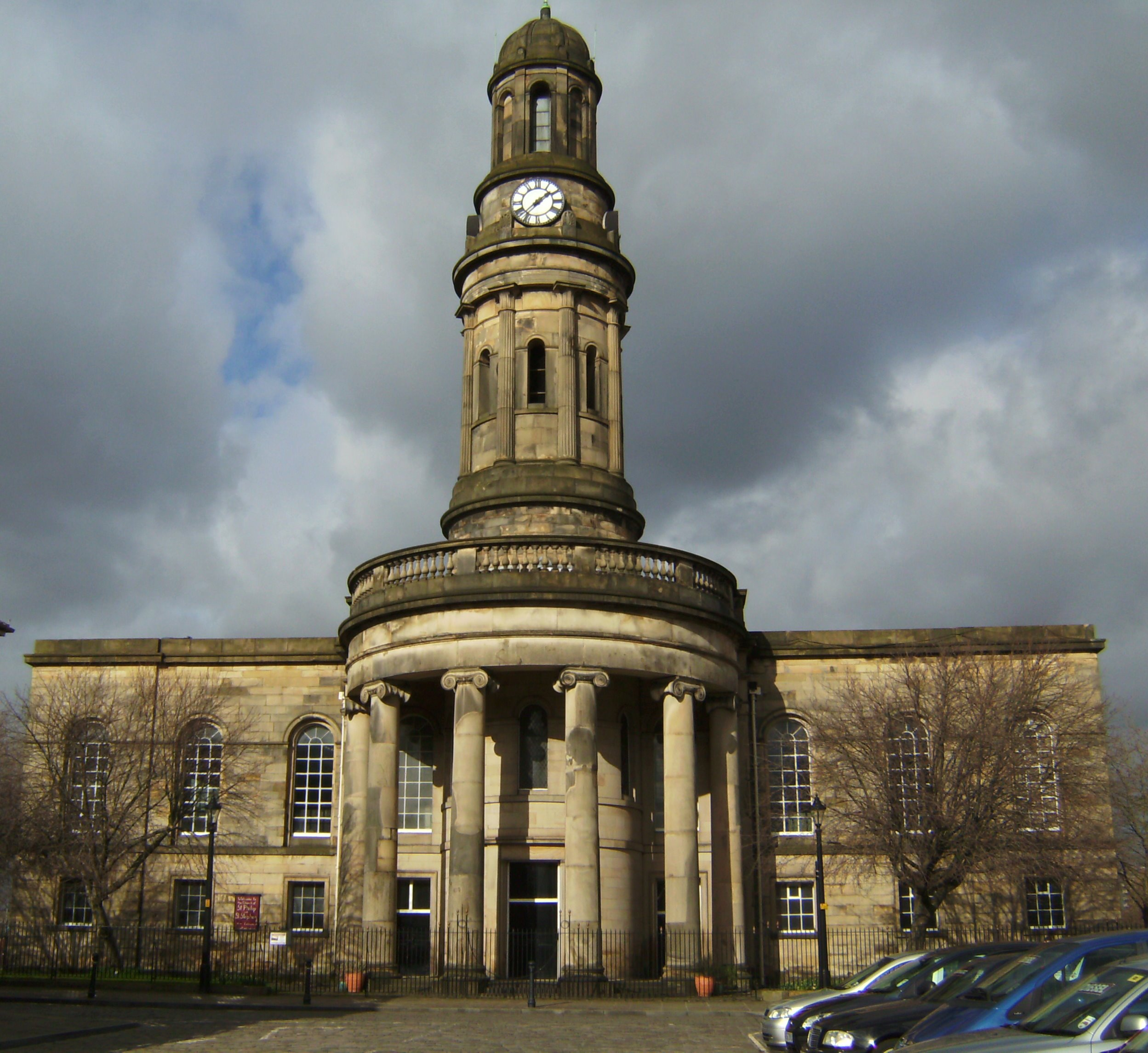
- St Philip's Church, Salford, from the south

- Location in Greater Manchester
- OS grid reference: SJ 826 986
- Location: Wilton Place, Salford, Greater Manchester
- Country: England
- Denomination: Church of England
- Website: St Philip, Salford

History
- Former name: The Parish Church of Saint Philip
- Status: Parish church
- Dedication: Philip the Apostle
- Consecrated: 21 September 1825

Architecture
- Functional status: Active
- Heritage designation: Grade II*
- Designated: 31 January 1952
- Architect: Sir Robert Smirke
- Architectural type: Church
- Style: Greek Revival
- Groundbreaking: 1822
- Completed: 1824; 202 years ago
- Construction cost: £14,670

Specifications
- Materials: Dressed stone

Administration
- Province: York
- Diocese: Manchester
- Archdeaconry: Salford
- Deanery: Salford
- Parish: St Philip with St Stephen, Salford

Clergy
- Rector: Rev Gareth Robinson

St Philip's Church is an Anglican parish church in the diocese of Manchester, in the deanery and archdeaconry of Salford. The church was renamed in 2016 as Saint Philip's Chapel Street. It is located at Wilton Place, off Chapel Street in Salford, Greater Manchester, England.

The structure is registered as a Grade II* listed building on England's National Heritage List. It was a Commissioners' church, having received a subsidy from the Church Building Commission for its erection. Sir Robert Smirke, the church's architect, reused his design for St Mary's Church, Bryanston Square, London. The tower design was also employed at Wandsworth's St Anne's Church.

== History ==
Smirke designed the church, which was completed between 1822 and 1824. The Church Building Commission provided a grant of £16,804 (equivalent to £1,510,000 in 2020) to help fund its construction. [A] J. Medland Taylor reorganised the inside of the church in 1895. The neighbouring church of St Stephen closed in 1962, and the parishes amalgamated to form St Philip with St Stephen.

== Architecture ==
=== Exterior ===
The exterior of St Philip's is made of ashlar stone. It was built in the Greek Revival style. It features an undivided design, with a bell tower atop a semi-circular portico to the south. The church's body is divided into two levels. The upper floor windows are round-headed, while the lower-storey windows are straight-headed. On the north and south sides, are nine bays, and on the east and west sides, are three bays. The portico encloses a semi-circular porch, covering the central three bays on the south side. An Ionic colonnade with a balustraded parapet supports the portico. Plain pilasters separate the bell tower's round-arched apertures, which are alternately open and blind. Above this stage there are four clock faces, and the summit is capped by a dome. The clock was made by Whitehurst and Company of Derby. On the west front are three doorways; the central bay projects slightly forward, and has a pedimented doorway.

=== Interior ===
The church's interior has galleries on three sides. The stained glass in the east window dates from the middle to late 19th Century; it was designed by R. B. Edmundson of Manchester. In the southeast chapel is a memorial to the First World War by Humphries, Jackson and Ambler, also of Manchester.

=== Organ ===
The two-manual organ was made by Renn and Boston in 1829. It was moved forward from a position above the west door to the west gallery in 1873 by Alex Young and Company, who also carried out modifications. The organ was cleaned and restored in 1915 by Wadsworth and Company. In 1963, Noel Mander, performed further restoration of the organ including reversing some of 1873 modifications to maintain its historic character.

== Present day ==
=== Services and other activities ===
Saint Philips provides a number of worship services; 9:30 am (Common Worship Communion service), 10:45 am (vibrant and contemporary service, including groups for children), and 6:30 pm (contemporary service) each Sunday.

The church runs a vibrant range of events and community activities, groups, and initiatives throughout the week, including Alpha for those exploring the Christian faith, Chapel Tots on Tuesdays for families and carers with babies and toddlers, Bags of Hope, Foodbank, student groups and youth groups.

Saint Philips works with St Philip's Church of England Primary School, located on Barrow Street.

== See also ==
- Grade II* listed buildings in Greater Manchester
- Listed buildings in Salford, Greater Manchester
- List of Commissioners' churches in Northeast and Northwest England

== Notes ==
^{A} The size of the grant was greater than the actual construction cost (as shown in the infobox) because it also included contributions towards the cost of the site, legal fees, etc.
