= Eagle Inn =

Listed pub and music venue in Salford, England

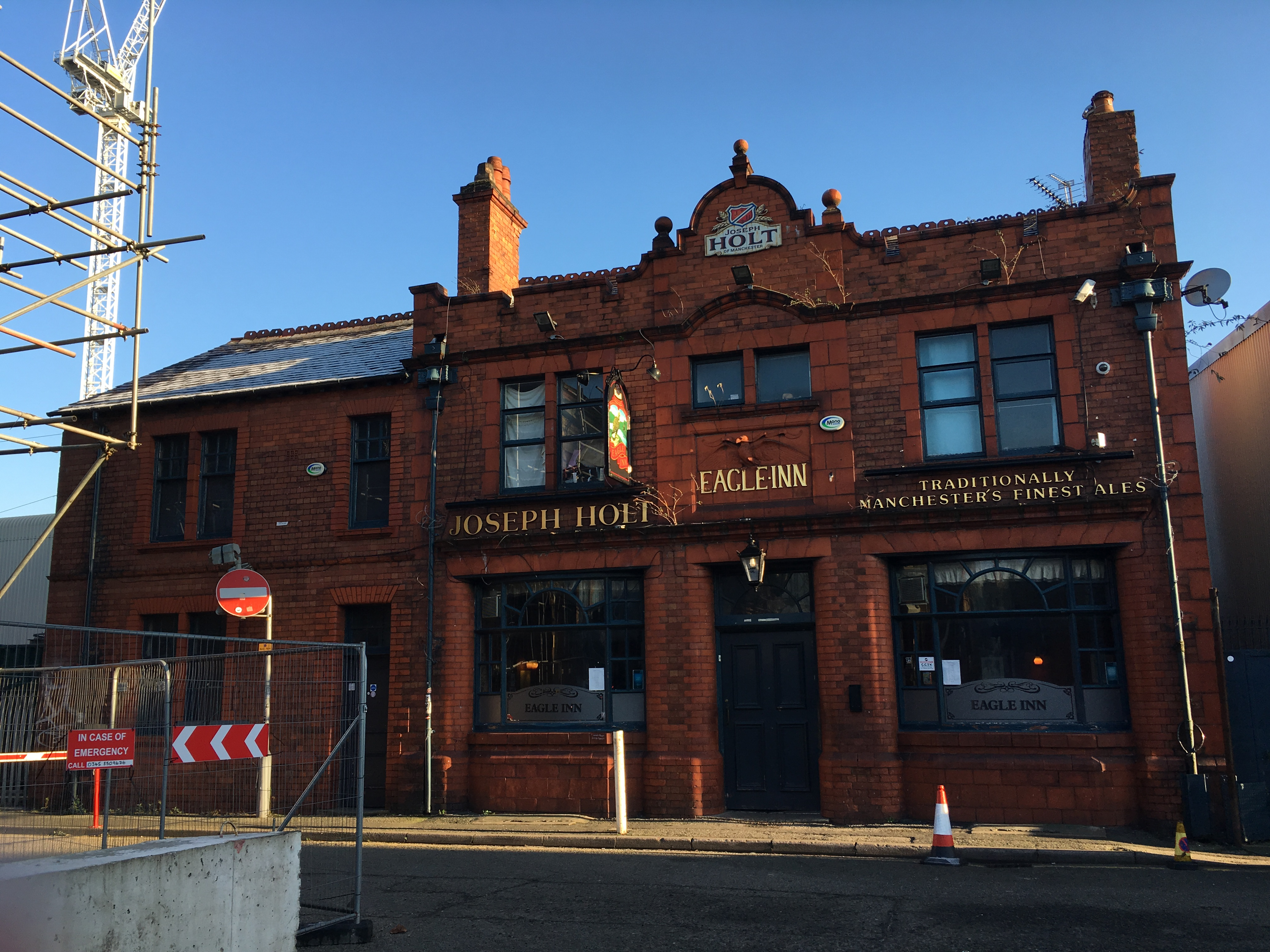
- The pub in 2016

- Location within Greater Manchester
- Alternative names: The Lamp Oil

General information
- Type: Public house
- Architectural style: Edwardian Baroque
- Location: 18–19 Collier Street, Salford, England
- Coordinates: 53.4873°N 2.2511°W
- Year built: 1902; 124 years ago
- Owner: Joseph Holt

Design and construction
- Designations

Listed Building – Grade II
- Official name: Eagle Inn and attached dwelling
- Designated: 20 March 2006
- Reference no.: 1392691

Website
- eagleinn.co.uk

The Eagle Inn is a Grade II listed public house on Collier Street in Salford, England. Dated 1902 and built in an Edwardian Baroque style, it is rated by the Campaign for Real Ale (CAMRA) for having an interior of "special national historic importance". Some sources suggest an earlier pub on the site by 1848, though this is not reflected in the official listing. An attached former terraced house has since been adapted for use as a live music venue.

== History ==
A rainwater head carries the date 1902, which may relate to a later re‑fronting of the public house rather than the original structure, according to its official listing. (Note: Other sources state the pub dates back to 1848.) An early licensee, John Stone, ran the pub while also operating a nearby coal yard that sold paraffin, a sideline that led to the nickname "The Lamp Oil". The 1922 and 1933 Ordnance Survey maps show the building but do not record a designation or name.

The Eagle Inn is regarded by the Campaign for Real Ale (CAMRA) as having an interior of "special national historic importance" and is rated one star in its grading scheme. On 20 March 2006, the Eagle Inn and the attached house was designated a Grade II listed building.

Following the transfer of the lease to Rupert Hill and his business partner in 2012, the former terraced house attached to the pub was converted into a space for live music. As of June 2026, the freehold was owned by Joseph Holt's Brewery. The building forms a group with the Grade II*-listed Public Baths opposite, designed by Thomas Worthington.

== Architecture ==
=== Exterior ===
The building is constructed in red brick with terracotta detailing and has slate roofs finished with patterned ridge tiles, with three chimney stacks rising from the gabled sections. The pub occupies an L‑shaped footprint and the attached house has a rectangular plan, both set directly onto the street.

The pub is designed in an Edwardian Baroque style and has two storeys above cellars. A deep base runs along the front, its upper edge cut back at an angle. The main elevation is arranged in three bays with the entrance in the centre. The original door survives, partly glazed with etched decoration, set within a timber screen that also contains etched glass panels and a fan‑shaped glazed section above. The outer bays each contain a recessed, angled bay window with some etched glass and curved glazing bars in the upper portion. A horizontal band marks the first‑floor level. Above the doorway, the central section projects slightly and carries a terracotta panel showing an eagle with the name "EAGLE INN", with a small two‑part window above. The outer first‑floor bays each contain a two‑part window. A rainwater head is marked 1902, possibly relating to a later re‑fronting. The roofline ends in a parapet with a shaped central feature topped by a ball and finial. Full‑height corner blocks frame the frontage, though on the side next to the house they appear only at first‑floor level, suggesting the house may originally have been single‑storey.

The house has two floors and continues the same deep base as the pub. Its entrance is on the right with a small window above, and to the left is a two‑part ground‑floor window with another two‑part window directly above at first‑floor level.

=== Interior ===
The building keeps its original arrangement of three rooms. The entrance leads into a small lobby used for drinking, with two doorways on the right giving access to the parlour and, behind it, the tap room. To the left of the bar area is a third and larger room. The lobby still has its ceramic wall finish and the original panelled bar counter, with narrow vertical supports carrying screens that include fixed glazed panels and curved overlights above the serving hatch. The parlour and the larger room both have fixed upholstered seating, picture rails and moulded cornices, while the tap room has timber panelling to mid‑height and a picture rail. Other early features include a small Art Nouveau fireplace in the larger room, along with moulded door surrounds and panelled doors. The bar counter in the larger room has been changed from its original form.

== See also ==
- Listed buildings in Salford
- Listed pubs in Greater Manchester
