= Sacred Trinity Church =

Listed church in Salford, England

- Church of the Sacred Trinity
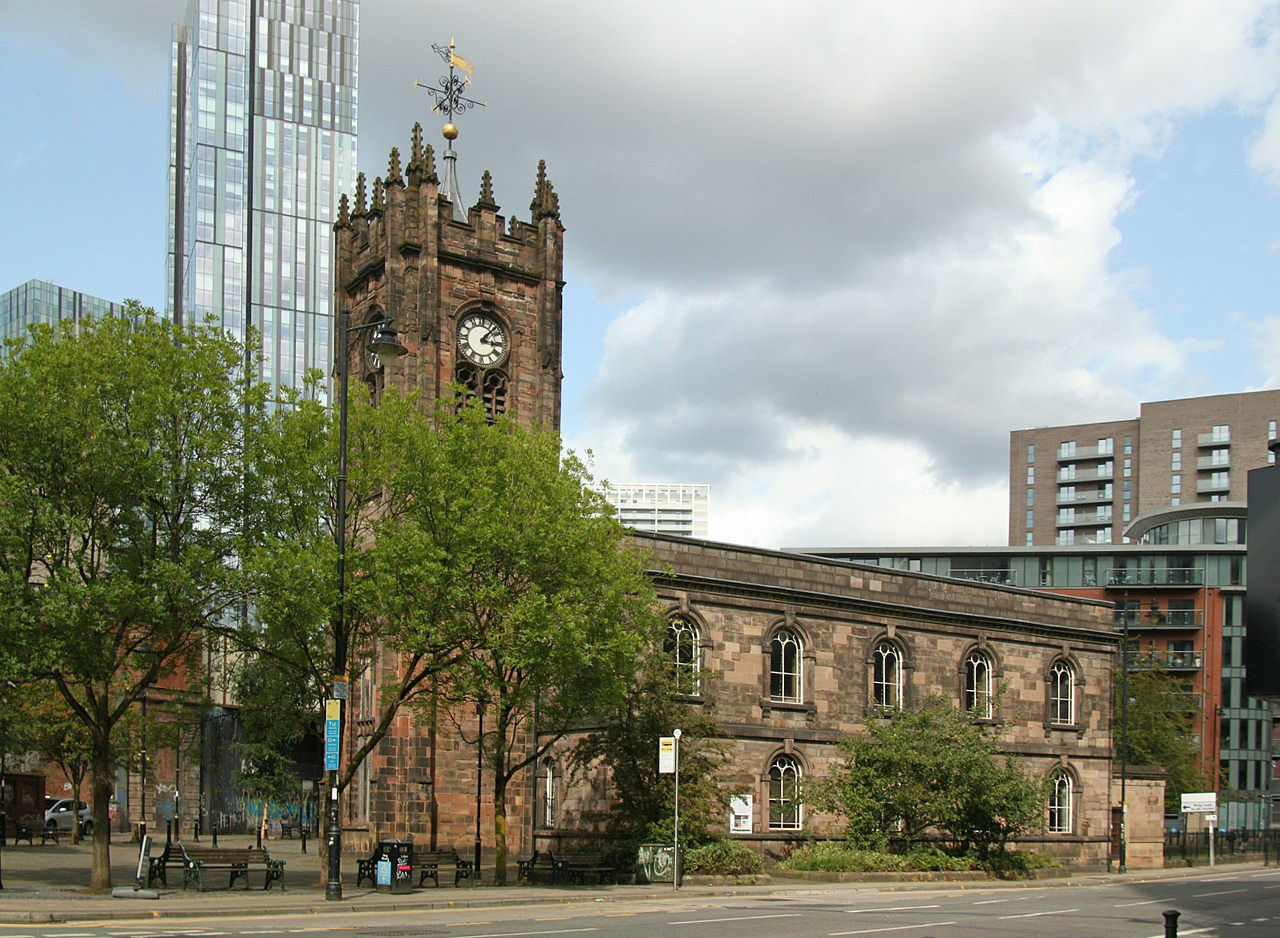
- The church in 2024

- Location in Greater Manchester
- 53.4848°N 2.2503°W
- OS grid reference: SJ 83486 98704
- Address: Chapel Street, Salford
- Country: England
- Denomination: Anglican
- Website: sacredtrinity.org.uk

Architecture
- Heritage designation: Grade II*
- Designated: 31 January 1952
- Architectural type: Church
- Years built: 1751–52 (with tower of 1635)

Administration
- Archdiocese: Archdeacon of Salford
- Diocese: Diocese of Manchester

Clergy
- Priest: Rev. Andy Salmon

Sacred Trinity Church is an Anglican parish church on Chapel Street in Salford, England. Founded in 1635, it is the oldest surviving church in the city and the only church in the country dedicated under the title Sacred Trinity. Largely rebuilt in 1752, the building has since undergone several major phases of alteration and restoration, resulting in a mixture of Jacobean, Georgian, Victorian, and early 20th‑century architectural elements. It is recorded in the National Heritage List for England as a Grade II* listed building.

== History ==
In 1635 the church was founded by Humphrey Booth, a prominent Salford merchant and philanthropist, who endowed the new chapel to serve the growing population of Chapel Street and the surrounding township. It became the first parish church to be built in Salford, receiving full parochial status in 1650, and the only church in the country dedicated under the title Sacred Trinity.

During the 17th and early 18th centuries, Sacred Trinity developed as a significant religious centre in the expanding industrial town. The church gained wider attention in 1733, when John Wesley preached there during his early evangelical mission. Wesley was later refused access to the church precincts on his return visit in 1747, reflecting the tensions between established Anglican clergy and emerging Methodist movements.

By the mid‑18th century, the original Jacobean structure required substantial repair. In 1751–52 the main body of the church was rebuilt in the contemporary Georgian style, replacing much of the earlier fabric while retaining the tower and elements of the original plan. This rebuilding established much of the church's present external character.

A major restoration campaign took place between 1871 and 1874, undertaken by the Manchester architect James Platt Holden. His work included a new west window and the remodelling of the bell openings in the tower, part of a wider effort to stabilise and update the ageing structure.

Further alterations occurred in the early 20th century, when the sanctuary and east wall were remodelled, and a south‑east porch and vestry was added to improve circulation and liturgical function. These works introduced modest Gothic influences to the interior.

On 31 January 1952, Sacred Trinity Church was designated a Grade II* listed building.

Today, Sacred Trinity remains an active Anglican parish church and a notable heritage landmark. It is known for its community engagement, small but active congregation, and its role in local cultural events, including music and arts activities hosted within the historic building.

== Architecture ==
The church is built of ashlar and consists of a west tower, nave and shallow chancel. The exterior includes a two‑stage tower in a transitional Gothic‑classical style, with a Decorated window divided by a transom in the lower stage and paired bell‑chamber lights above. It has angle pilasters and a triglyph frieze below an embattled parapet with cusped finials, and is topped by a leaded spirelet with a wrought‑iron weather vane.

The nave is expressed as two storeys to accommodate the galleried interior. It has round‑arched doorways to the north‑west and south‑west with heavy voussoirs to the arches, and round‑arched windows with kneelers and keystones on each floor, separated by a plain string course. A modillion eaves cornice runs below the parapet. The chancel projects as a small rectangular bay and contains a pair of round‑headed windows with a round‑headed niche above, together with a string course.

=== Interior ===
Internally, the building has a galleried plan, with the aisles beneath the gallery now partitioned to form separate offices. The galleries are currently used as a library. There is moulded wood panelling to the gallery and to the casing of the supporting piers, above which stand Doric columns. The shallow king post and panelled roof dates from the Victorian restoration.

== War memorial ==
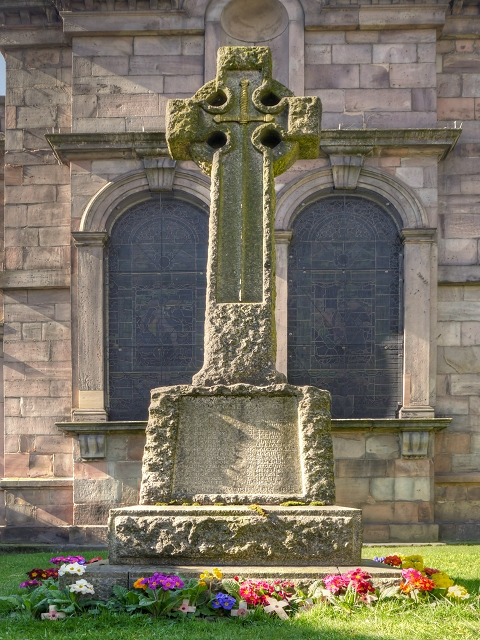
War memorial in churchyard

Within the churchyard stands a Grade II listed granite war memorial commemorating local servicemen who died during the First World War, together with one of the most famous civilian casualties of the conflict, Edith Cavell. Cavell worshipped at Sacred Trinity in 1906–07, when she lived nearby and worked at the Manchester and Salford Workhouse under the direction of the Queen's Nursing Institute. During the war she assisted allied soldiers who were behind enemy lines to escape from German-occupied Belgium to Britain. In August 1915 she was arrested and was killed by firing squad two months later.

== See also ==
- Grade II* listed buildings in Greater Manchester
- Listed buildings in Salford
