= Threlfalls Brewery =

Building in Salford, Greater Manchester, England

Deva City Office Park
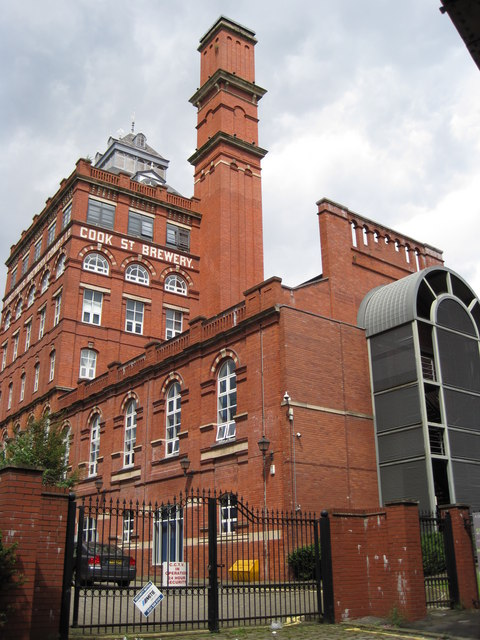
- Threlfalls Brewery on Cook Street, Salford
- Former names: Threlfalls Brewery

General information
- Location: Cook Street, Salford
- Coordinates: 53.4845°N 2.2537°W
- Completed: 1895; 130 years ago
- Owner: Highcross

Website
- http://www.devamanchester.co.uk/

Threlfalls Brewery is a Grade II listed building on Cook Street, Salford, England, built in 1896 to the design of W.A. Deighton for Chester's Brewery Company.

The brewery premises, comprising two-storey offices, copper room, maturing room, single-storey boiler room, chimney and five-storey tower, were built in pressed red brick with ashlar dressings and Welsh slate roofs.

== Company ==
Threlfall's Brewery Company had breweries in Liverpool and Salford. The company was active between 1861 and 1967. John Mayor Threlfall bought the Lupton and Adamthwaite Brewery in 1861. The company was registered in Liverpool in 1888. In around 1895, Threlfall's bought the Blue Lion (previously White Lion and Apollo) public house on Cook Street in Salford and built the Cook Street Brewery. The company took over Chester's in 1961 and, in 1963/64, began the process of integrating the Chesters operation onto the Cook Street site. Initially, a disused building was refurbished, at much cost, to be the new Chesters offices. It was completely self-contained, even down to its own telephone switchboard, and when the staff were transferred from Ardwick it was under the pretence that all their jobs would continue and that Chesters would maintain its own identity. Privately, many feared that this would only be a temporary arrangement. Threlfall's operated the Cook Street site as Threlfall Chesters Brewery Ltd, while Threlfalls continued to brew in its Liverpool brewery. The Chesters brewery, in Ardwick, continued in operation until 1966. It was demolished a year later and the integration was complete. At Crook Street the two sets of offices were gradually merged and staffing reduced, as had always been expected.

The Threlfall's group included West Cheshire Brewery, Birkenhead Brewery and Mackies off licences. Whitbread took over the group including the Moorhouse's soft drinks company in 1967 and the Salford site became surplus to requirements in 1999. Whitbread closed the company's head office, brewery and bottling plant in Trueman Street Liverpool in the early 1980s. In 1967, Threlfall's was the eighth largest brewery in the UK and the largest in North West England. After the takeover, Whitbread, a predominantly southern based business, became the second largest brewery business in the UK

== Redevelopment ==
The grade II listed Salford premises have been redeveloped into the Deva Centre, an urban business village. The Liverpool buildings have been partly demolished and replaced with flats and the head office converted to small office units. The brewery's hundred or so public houses and hotels covered the North West of England, with a few in North Wales.

== See also ==
- Listed buildings in Salford, Greater Manchester
