= Architecture of Manchester =

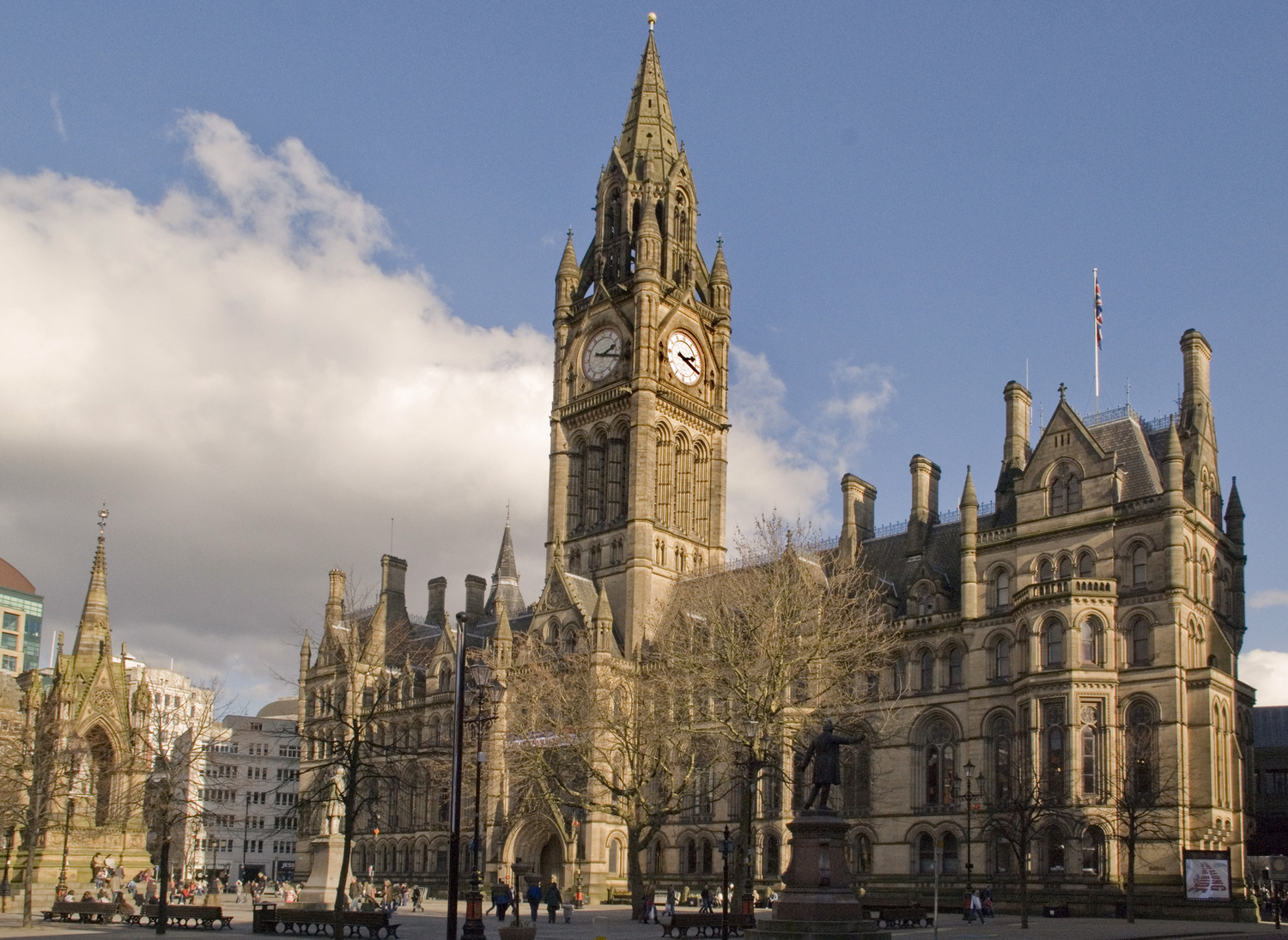
Manchester's Victorian neo-Gothic town hall

The architecture of Manchester showcases a rich variety of styles. The city, a product of the Industrial Revolution, is regarded as the first modern industrial city. Manchester is noted for its warehouses, railway viaducts, cotton mills, and canals—remnants of its past as a hub for production and trade. The city has minimal Georgian or medieval architecture and instead boasts an array of 19th and early 20th-century styles, including Palazzo, Neo-Gothic, Venetian Gothic, Edwardian baroque, Art Nouveau, Art Deco, and Neo-Classical.

Manchester burgeoned as a result of the Industrial Revolution, with the Bridgewater Canal and Manchester Liverpool Road station becoming the first true canal and railway station used to transport goods. The Industrial Revolution made Manchester a wealthy city, but much of that wealth was spent on lavish projects, often at the expense of its population. Engineering developments such as the Manchester Ship Canal symbolised a prosperous and proud Manchester; likewise, Mancunian buildings of the Victorian era reflected this wealth, with the finest examples including the neo-Gothic town hall and the John Rylands Library. At the height of the Industrial Revolution, the city had nearly 2,000 warehouses. Many of them have since been converted for other uses, but their external appearance remains largely unchanged, allowing the city to retain much of its industrial, brooding character.

The 1996 IRA bombing sparked a major regeneration project, with new buildings such as Urbis forming a centrepiece of the redevelopment. In recent years, there has been renewed interest in constructing skyscrapers in Manchester, with Manchester City Council signalling that it would be sympathetic towards 'iconic' skyscrapers that 'reflect the historic non-comformist attitude and uniqueness of the city'. The Beetham Tower was completed in autumn 2006 and, until 2018, was the tallest building in the UK outside London—at which point it was surpassed by the South Tower at Deansgate Square, also in Manchester. City-centre regeneration coincided with the property boom of the 2000s, with one urbanist remarking on "the sheer number of cranes and the noise of the building work, with the sound of pneumatic drills in my ears wherever I went".

Manchester was granted city status in 1853 due to its rapid development, becoming the first city to receive such status since Bristol in 1542. Manchester was also placed on a provisional list for UNESCO World Heritage site status, highlighting the city's role in the Industrial Revolution and its extensive canal network. Castlefield, west of the city centre, is Britain's only Urban Heritage Park, created to preserve the character and history of the area.

== History ==
The Roman fort, Mamucium, on the sandstone bluff at the junction of the Rivers Irwell and Medlock gave Castlefield its name. The fort's remains including a short, seven feet high section of wall are protected as a scheduled monument. The Romans left Mamucium in 410 AD and the settlement was subsequently occupied by Saxons who renamed it Manigcastre. It was taken by the Danes in 870 AD, the significance of which is seen in the street patterns and names. The gate suffix in Deansgate and Millgate derives from the Old Norse gata meaning road. In the 10th century, the cliff at the junction of the Irwell and the Irk became the preferred site when a church dedicated to St Mary was built at St Mary's Gate and the Danish town grew around it. The settlement was important enough to be given the right to strike coinage by King Canute.

There has been a church on the site of the cathedral since 1215. Another medieval survival is the Hanging Bridge across the filled-in Hanging Ditch, a stream south of the cathedral. All that remains are two sandstone arches now incorporated into the cathedral's visitor centre. When Thomas De la Warre obtained a licence to refound the church as a collegiate parish church, a college of priests was built of red Collyhurst sandstone on the site of his manor house. The college had a large hall, warden's lodgings and rooms for the priests. Two ancient halls survive outside the city centre, Clayton Hall is a rare example of a medieval moated site and Baguley Hall is a timber-framed hall from the 14th century.

Shambles Square, created after the 1996 bombing with the timber-framed Old Wellington Inn, Sinclair's Oyster Bar and the Mitre Hotel preserves some of the city's oldest buildings of their type. The original site of the Shambles was the location of butchers' shops and abattoirs.

In the 16th century, domestic cloth weaving became important, and an Act of Parliament regulated the length of Manchester Cottons (which were actually woollens) to 22 yards. By 1641 Manchester was producing both cotton and linen cloth. A bequest from wealthy cloth merchant, Humphrey Chetham was responsible for the Chetham's School and Library in the mediaeval collegiate building. St Ann's Church, attributed to Wren or one of his pupils, was built in 1712 in St Ann's Square which became the fashionable area of town. Seven other churches were built during the 18th century, none of which survive. St James Square (1735) was built by the Jacobites. Planned development occurred in the 1750s between Market Street, Cross Street, King Street and Mosley Street.

Relatively few houses in the city centre survive from the Georgian era, one is Richard Cobden's townhouse from the 1770s. Another survival is a row of three-storey town houses built in red brick with sandstone dressings, now used as shops and offices on Princess Street. Terraced houses were built on Byrom Street and Quay Street for the middle classes at the turn of the 18th and 19th centuries, but few dwellings for the working classes survive except for a few north of Piccadilly Gardens and in Castlefield. Houses built for artisans and skilled workers had attic workshops housing handlooms for weaving. Other city-centre dwellings had cellars and attics but none survive.

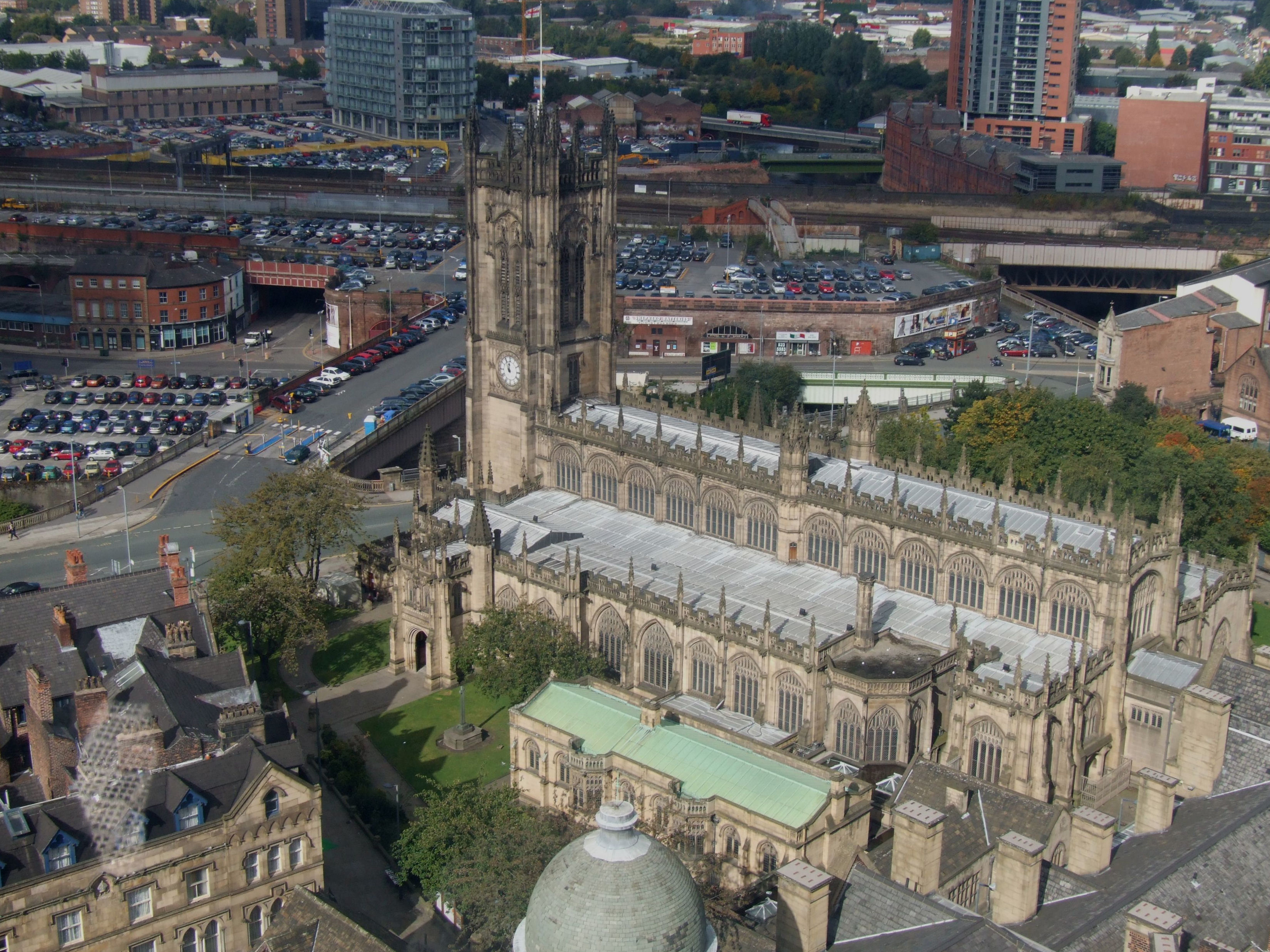
Manchester Cathedral

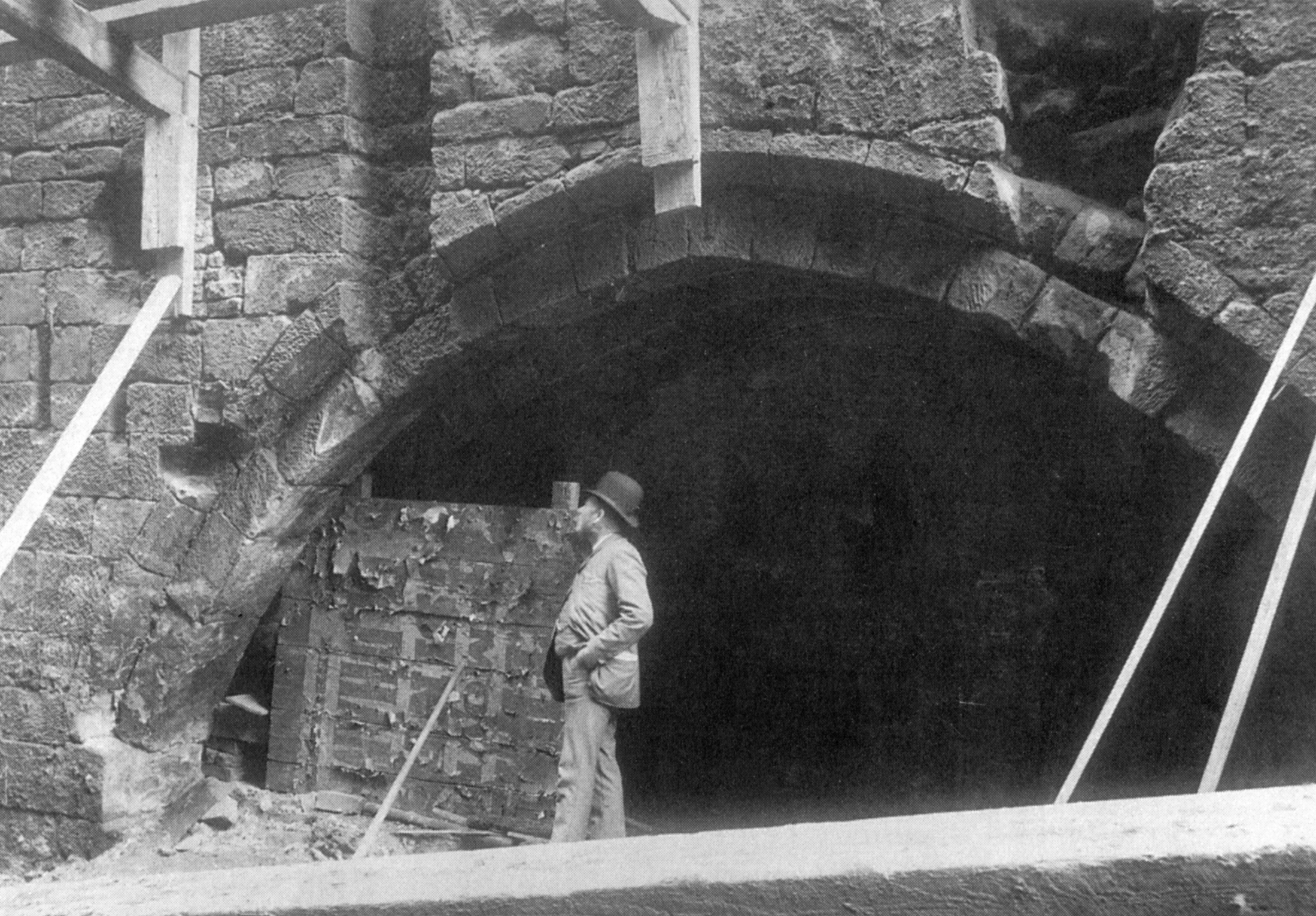
The medieval Hanging Bridge excavated in Victorian times.

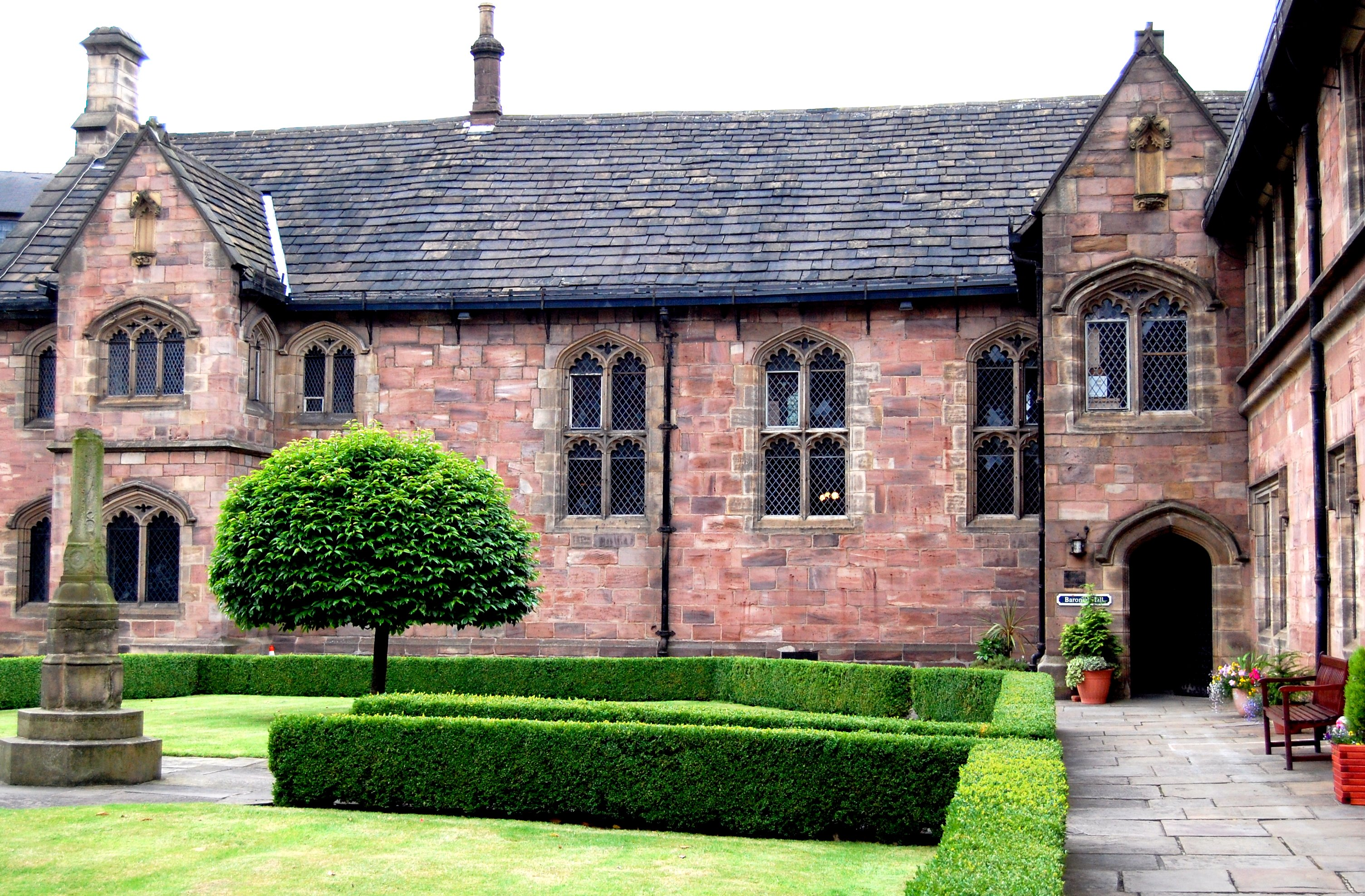
Chetham's School and Library dates from the medieval era.

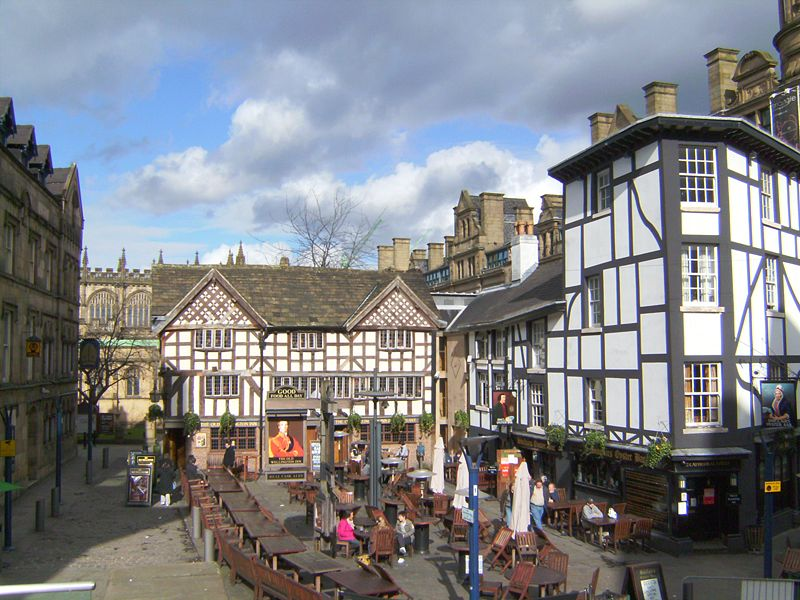
Shambles Square as rebuilt.

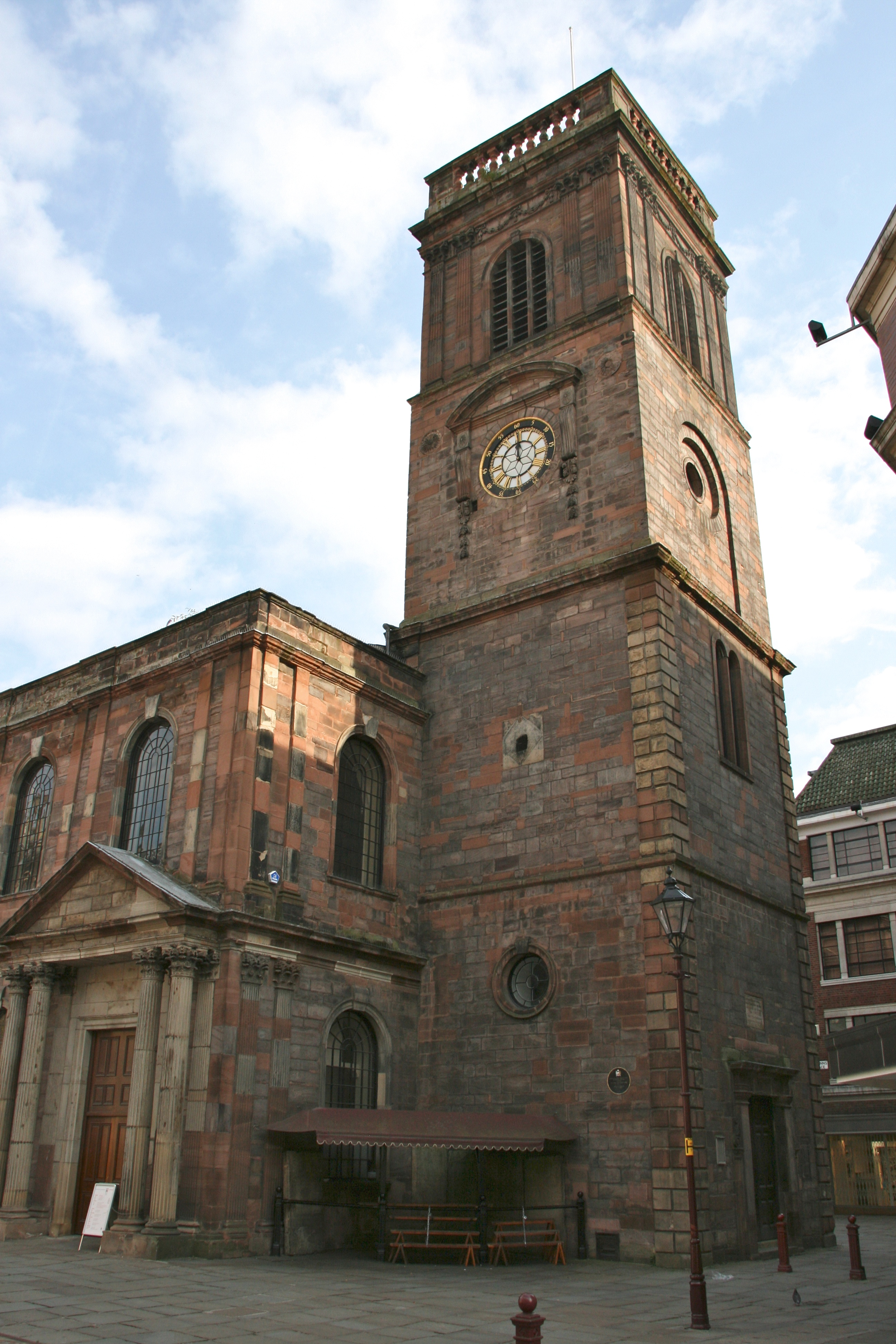
St Ann's Church dates from 1712.

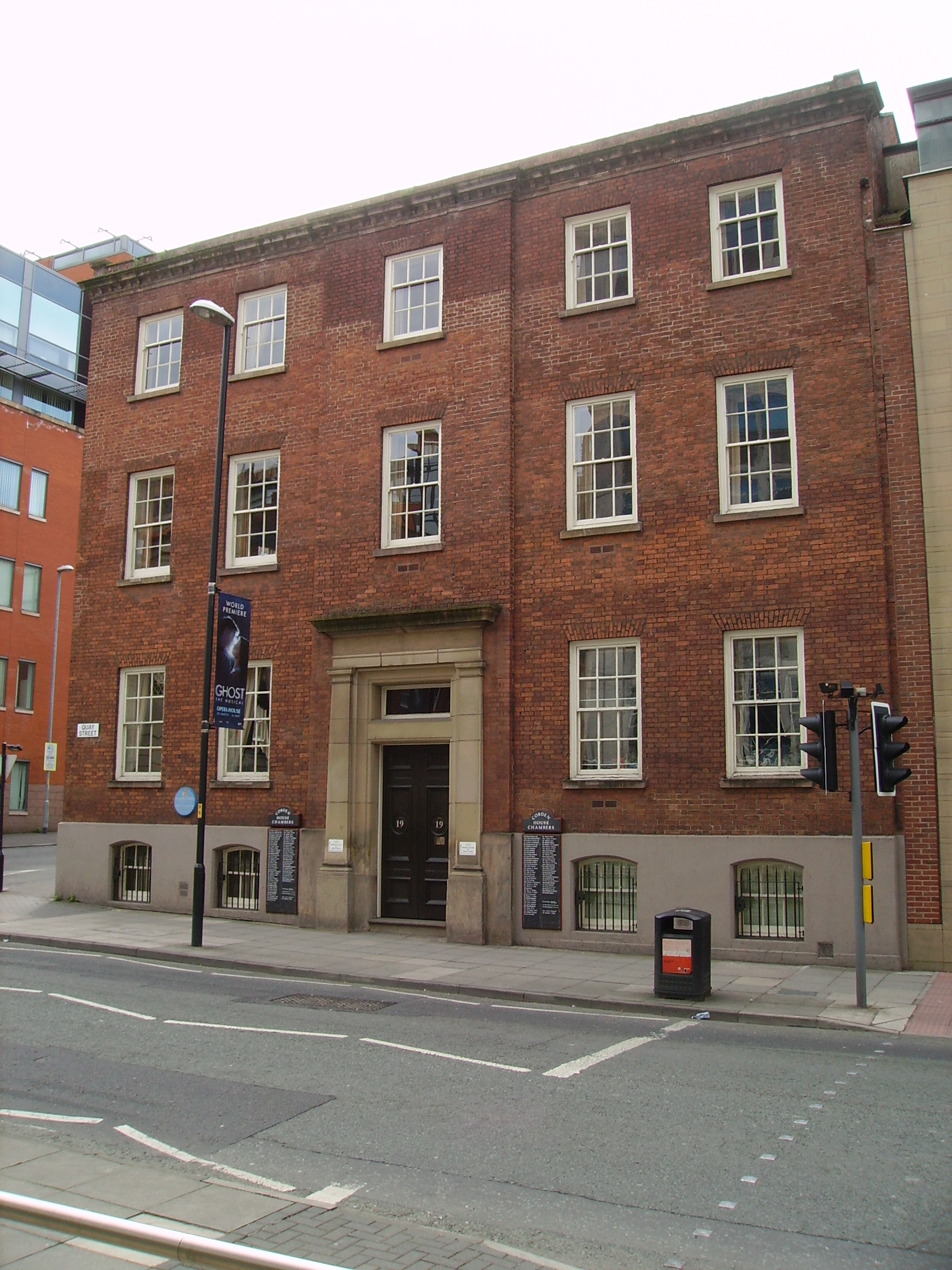
County Court was built in 1770.

== Post-Industrial Revolution ==
=== Transport and industry ===
The Industrial Revolution gathered momentum after the Bridgewater Canal was opened to Castlefield on 10 July 1761. The canal brought coal to the town from Worsley and when in 1776 it had been extended, cotton could be shipped into the town from the Port of Liverpool. At Castlefield Basin are a series of early warehouses, such as the Dukes Warehouse and the Grocers Warehouse. By 1800 the Bridgewater at Castlefield was connected to the Rochdale Canal and beyond that to the Ashton Canal. On the Ashton Canal the Store Street Aqueduct designed by Benjamin Outram, is believed to be the first skewed aqueduct of its kind and the oldest still in use and a brick lock-keeper's cottage constructed about 1800 survives by Lock No.2.

The canals shaped the layout of the city attracting wharves and warehouses, transporting coal and heavy materials and provided water to run steam-engines. Large cotton mill complexes survive on the fringes of the city centre, Murrays Mills, the McConnel & Kennedy Mills and Beehive Mill at Ancoats were built from the 1790s. The oldest surviving fireproof mill is at Chorlton New Mills in Chorlton on Medlock.

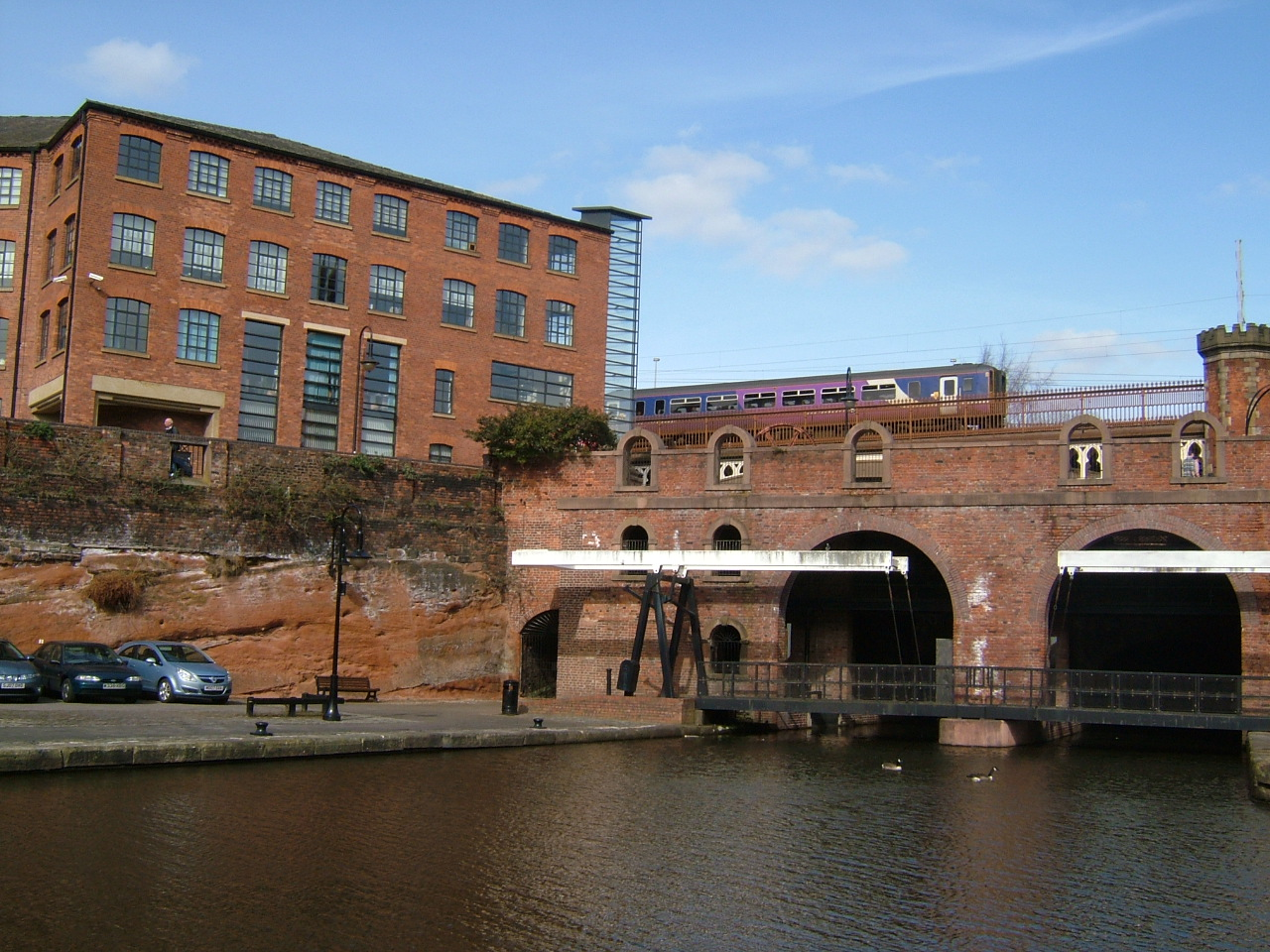
The Bridgewater Canal and the remains of the Grocer's Warehouse in Castlefield.

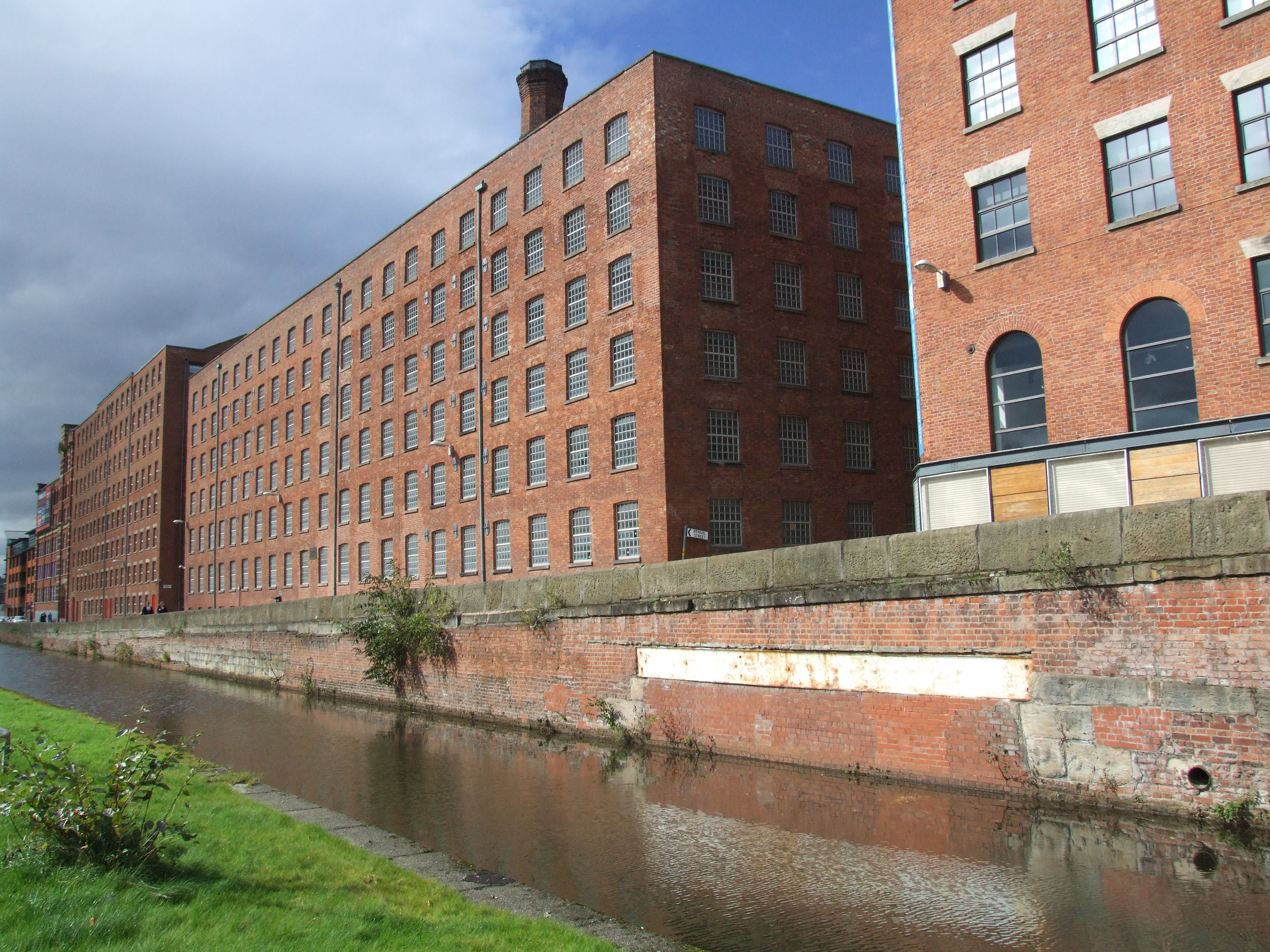
The Rochdale Canal in Ancoats and Murrays' Mills built 1797–1804.

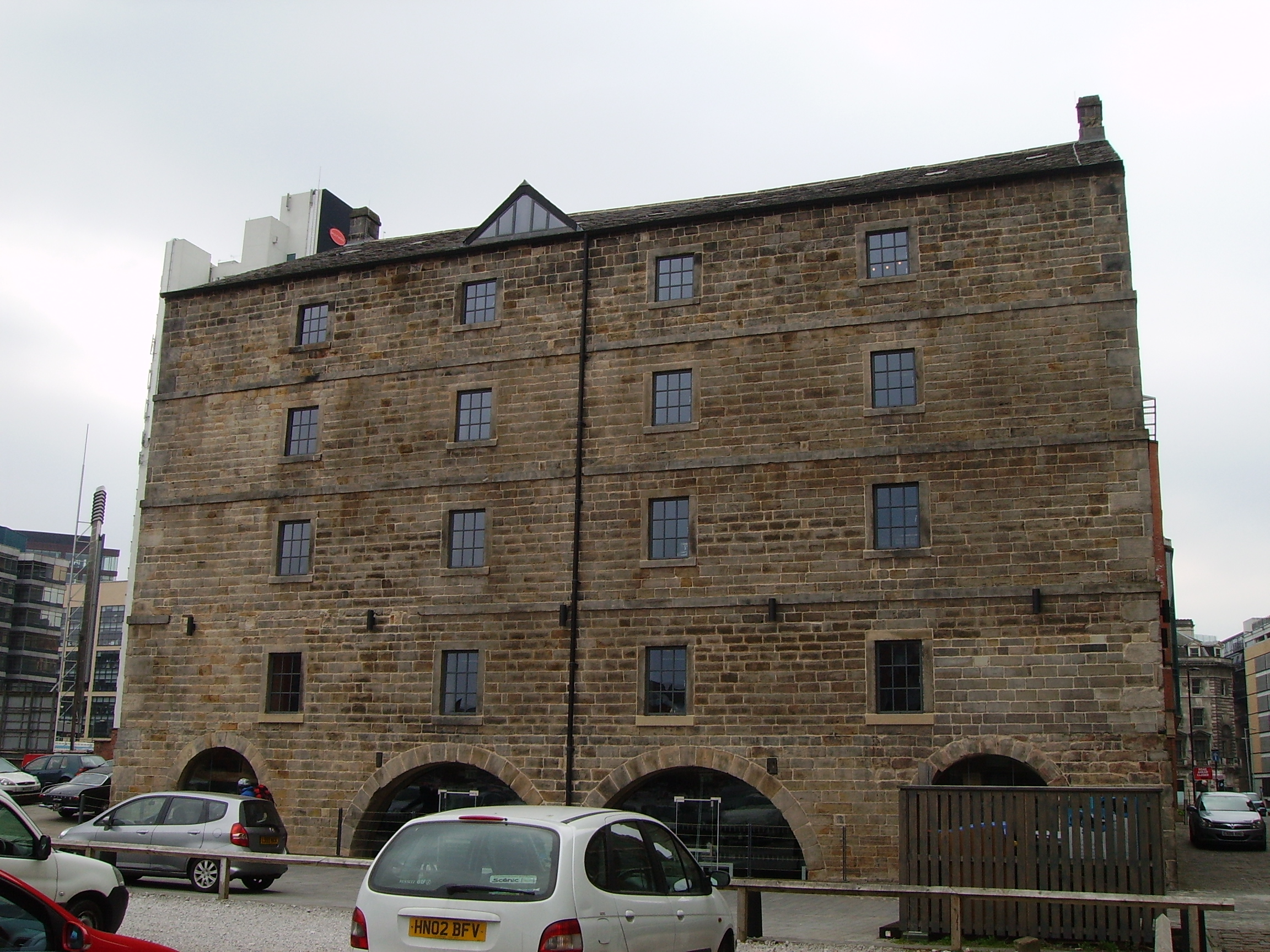
The Dale Street Warehouse built in 1806.

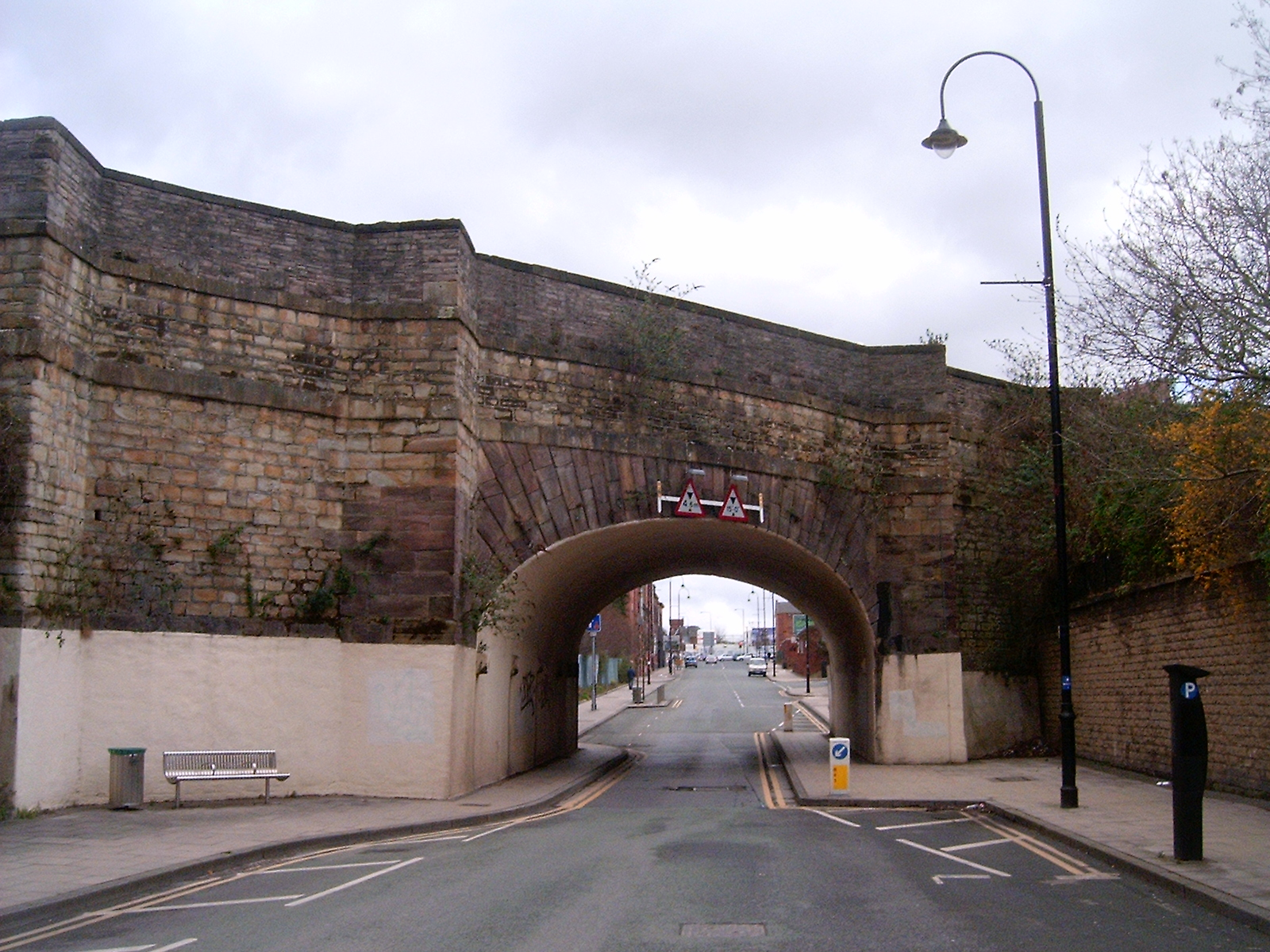
Store Street Aqueduct, which carries the Ashton Canal.

Manchester was linked to Salford across the River Irwell by a ford and subsequently by Salford Old Bridge in the 14th century. During the 19th century, more bridges were built. The old bridge was replaced by Victoria Bridge which has a single arch span of about 100 feet (30 m) constructed from sandstone in 1839. Other Victorian bridges over the Irwell are the three-arched Blackfriars Bridge, the skew arched Albert Bridge and the wrought iron Palatine Bridge.

Modern bridges include the Hulme Arch Bridge completed in 1997 and the Trinity footbridge across the Irwell designed by Santiago Calatrava in 1994. It has a rotund pylon which rises to 41 metres (135 ft) from which tension cables hang down to suspend the footbridge deck. Merchants Bridge at Castlefield Basin, built in 1996 by Whitby Bird, is a dramatic curving footbridge contrasting with seven older bridges.

The Liverpool and Manchester Railway, the world's first passenger railway was built in 1830 and Manchester Liverpool Road railway station opened. The classically designed station and adjoining Georgian station master's house are part of the Museum of Science and Industry. The railways required large viaducts and bridges to carry the track into Manchester's several stations. Four viaducts cross the canal basin at Castlefield, and from there an arched brick viaduct carries the railway to Piccadilly, Oxford Road and Deansgate stations. At Castlefield there are cast iron arch bridges crossing the Rochdale Canal, Castle Street and Chester Road. Liverpool Road was the first of the city's stations, of which four remain in the city centre. Piccadilly and Victoria which has a long Baroque frontage and glass canopy are the largest; Piccadilly retains is Victorian train shed and Victoria its Edwardian facade. Deansgate has a curved corner frontage with mock portcullis and embattled parapet. Oxford Road was rebuilt in 1960 in concrete and wood.

The Midland Railway's Manchester Central Station, one of the city's main railway terminals, was built between 1875 and 1880 and was closed in 1969. Its huge wrought-iron, single-span arched roof, spanning 210 feet (64 m), 550 feet (168 m) long and 90 feet (27 m) in height, is a listed building. The station has been converted for use as a conference centre. The associated Midland Hotel designed by Charles Trubshaw was constructed between 1898 and 1903 from red brick and brown terracotta and clad in several varieties of polished granite and Burmantofts terracotta to withstand the polluted environment of Manchester. Mayfield Station, opened in 1910 next to Manchester Piccadilly by the London & North Western Railway, closed in 1960 and lies derelict. Manchester Exchange operated between 1884 and 1969 near Manchester Cathedral; most of the station was in Salford and its 1929 extension east of the Irwell was in Manchester and was linked with the adjacent Victoria Station.

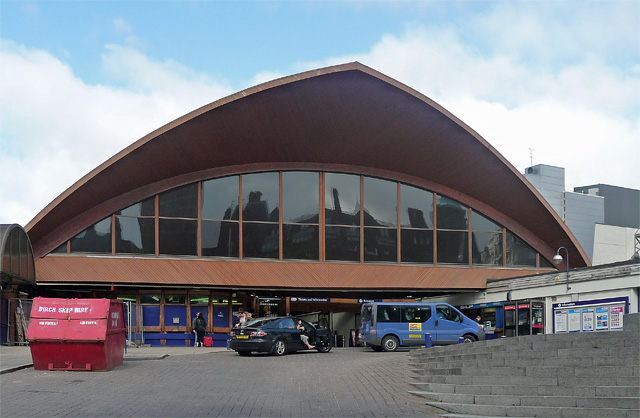
Oxford Road Station

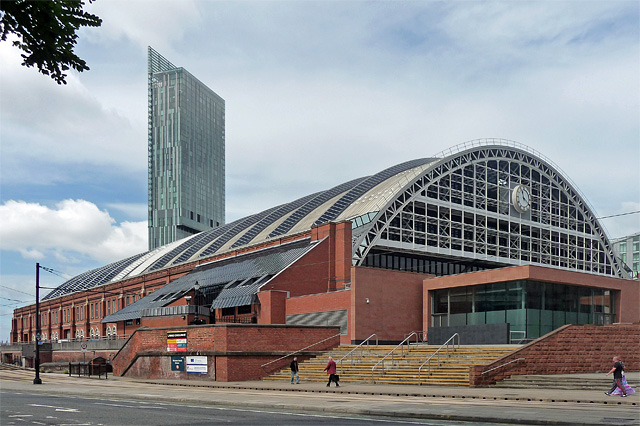
Manchester Central railway station, now a conference centre

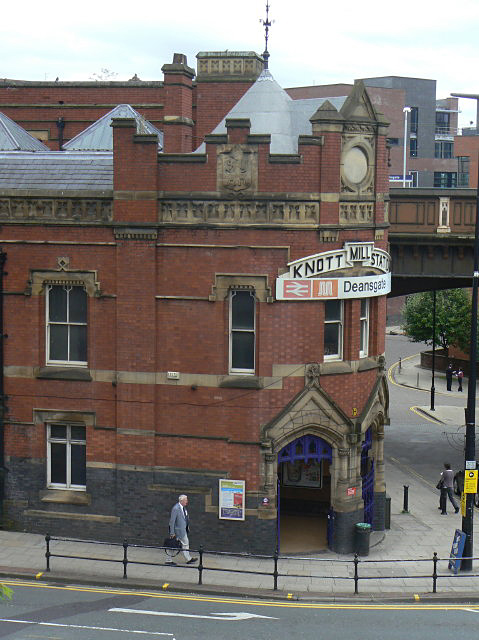
Deansgate Station

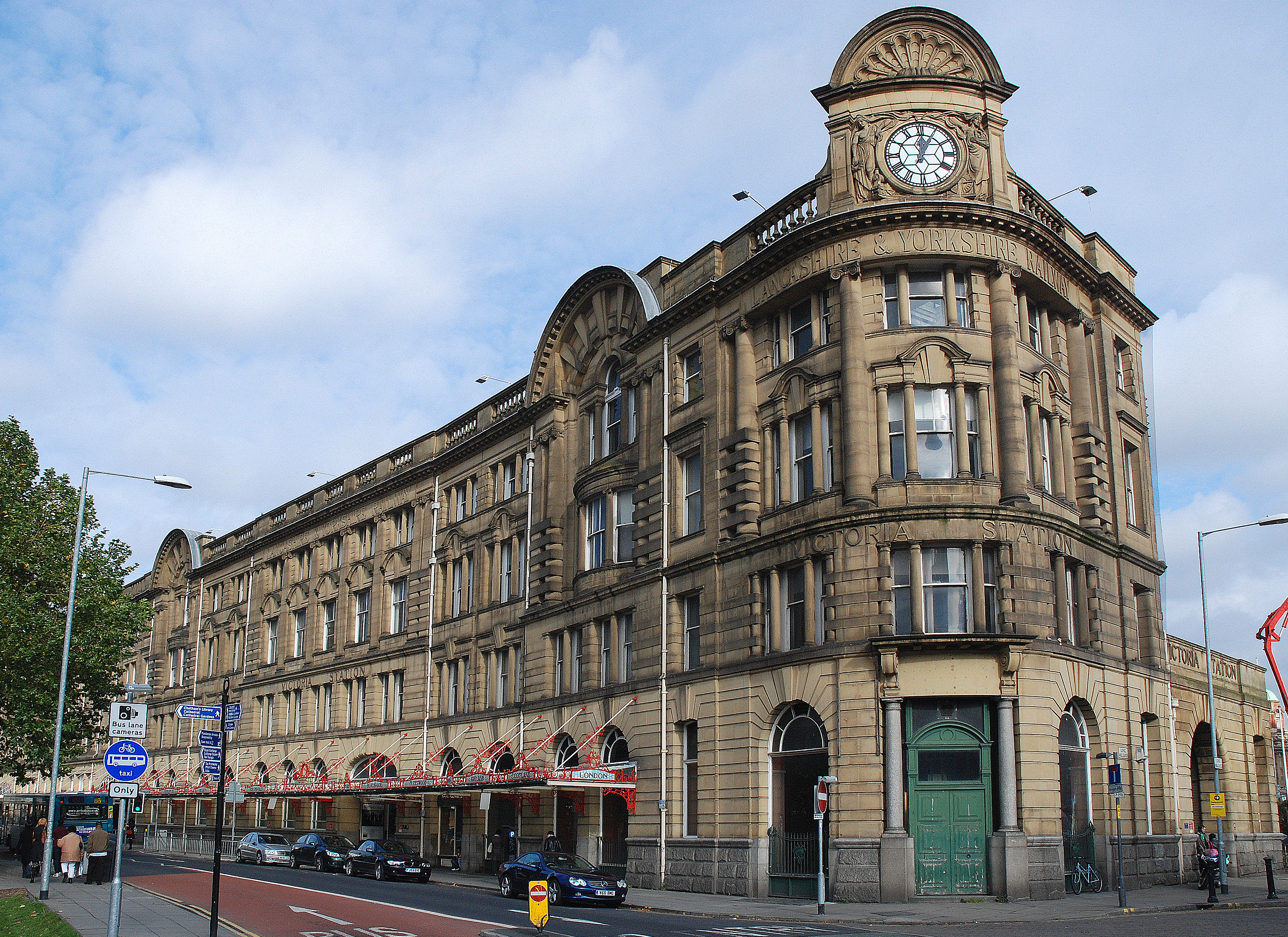
Facade of Victoria Station

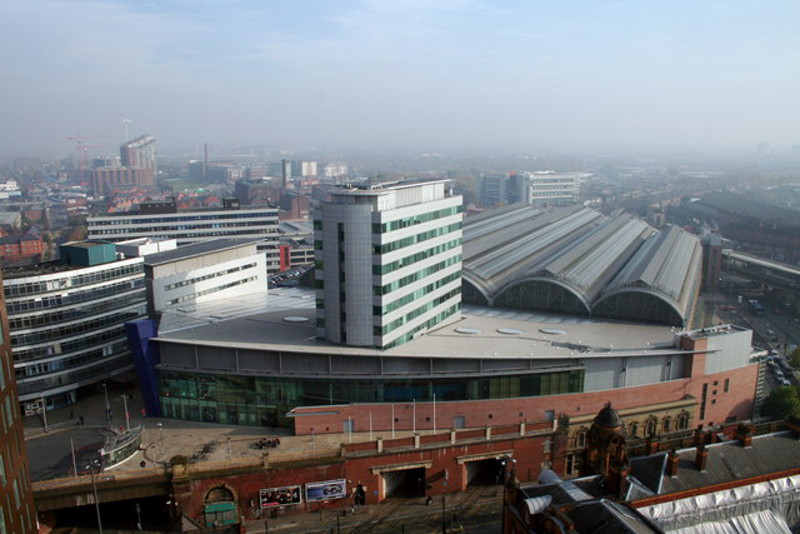
Piccadilly Station from above

=== Public buildings ===
Manchester's first town hall, designed by Francis Goodwin, was constructed during 1822–25 in the neo-classical style with a screen of Ionic columns. Its facade was re-erected as a folly in Heaton Park at the west end of its lake in 1913. Manchester was granted a Charter of Incorporation in 1838. Classical architecture gave way to neo-Gothic and Palazzo styles in the Victorian era. Edward Walters designed the Free Trade Hall in the 1850s as a monument to the Peterloo Massacre and Manchester's pivotal role in the Anti-Corn Law League. Built as a public hall, only the facade remains. The old town hall was replaced by the present town hall, designed by Alfred Waterhouse. Completed in 1877, its Great Hall contains the Manchester Murals by Ford Madox Brown.

Waterhouse was influenced by Pugin and most of his designs were in the Gothic Revival style. He is a prolific contributor to the design of Manchester's public, educational and commercial buildings. Waterhouse's exteriors used large quantities of "self-washing" terracotta to provide rich ornament in the polluted atmosphere and after 1880 his interiors were decorated with moulded and glazed faience both manufactured by the Burmantofts Pottery. He designed the Royal Insurance Office, in which he had an office, in 1861. The now demolished Manchester Assize Courts, built between 1864 and 1877 in the neo-Gothic style, was a major commission. In the 1860s, Waterhouse designed Strangeways Gaol, its French Gothic style gatehouse in red brick with sandstone dressings and landmark tower in red brick with sandstone dressings in the style of a minaret.

The City Police Courts in red brick with an impressive tower in the Italian Gothic style was completed in 1871 on Minshull Street by another proponent of the Gothic style Thomas Worthington. Worthington's last commission in the city was the flamboyant Flemish Gothic Nicholls Hospital, an orphanage that is now part of The Manchester College and has similarities with the Minshull Street Courts.

Acres Fair moved to Castlefield in 1872 and after it was abolished, the market traders remained at Lower Campfield Market and Higher Campfield Market which were later covered by large, glazed buildings with cast-iron frames by Mangnall and Littlewood. Lower Campfield Market is now the Air and Space Gallery of the Museum of Science and Industry.

London Road Fire Station of 1906 was designed in the Edwardian Baroque style by Woodhouse, Willoughby and Langham in red brick and terracotta. The building, on the Buildings at Risk Register, is currently unoccupied. The eclectic Jacobean and Baroque styled Victoria Baths in Chorlton on Medlock opened in September 1906. It included private baths, a laundry, three swimming pools and a Victorian-style Turkish bath.

In the 1930s, Vincent Harris won competitions to design two of the city's civic buildings. The town hall extension between St Peter's Square and Lloyd Street was built between 1934 and 1938 to provide accommodation for local government services. Its eclectic style was designed to be a link between the ornate Gothic Revival town hall and the classical rotunda of the Central Library built four years earlier.

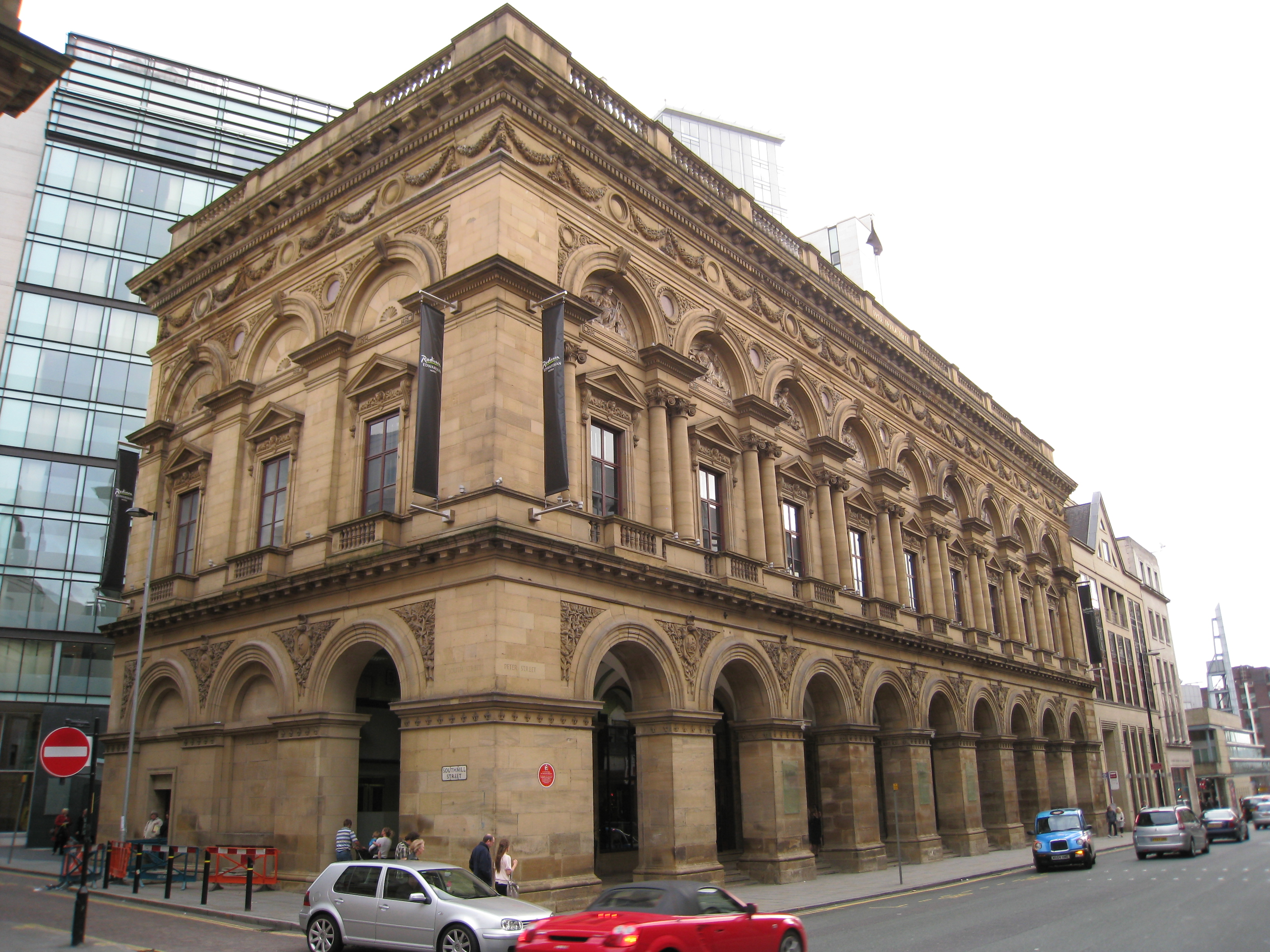
The Free Trade Hall.

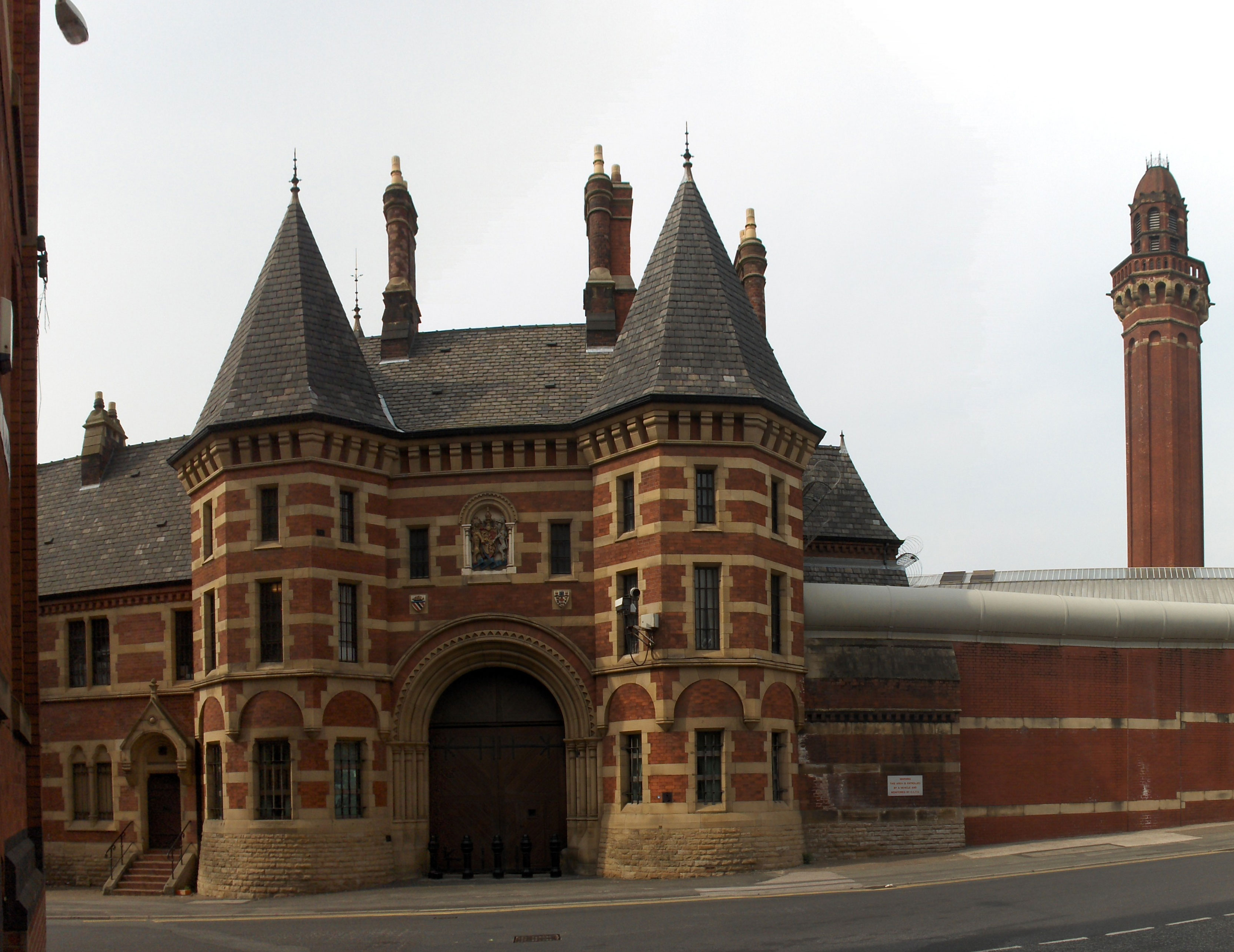
The French Gothic gatehouse of Strangeways Prison by Alfred Waterhouse.

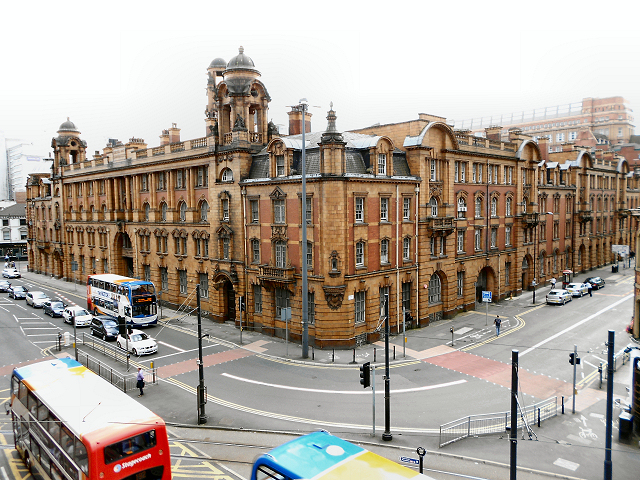
London Road Fire Station opened in 1903.

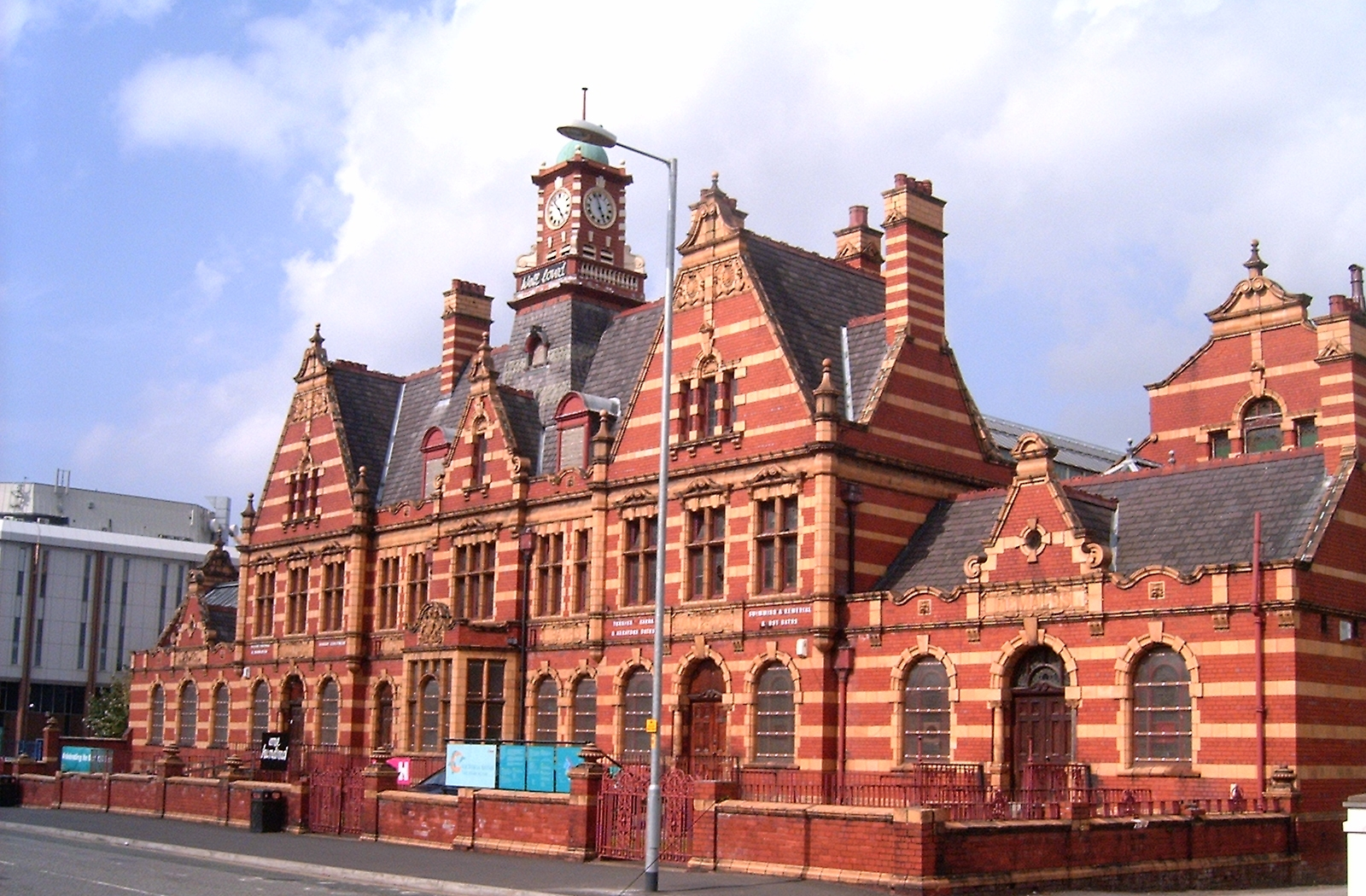
The ornate façade of Victoria Baths.

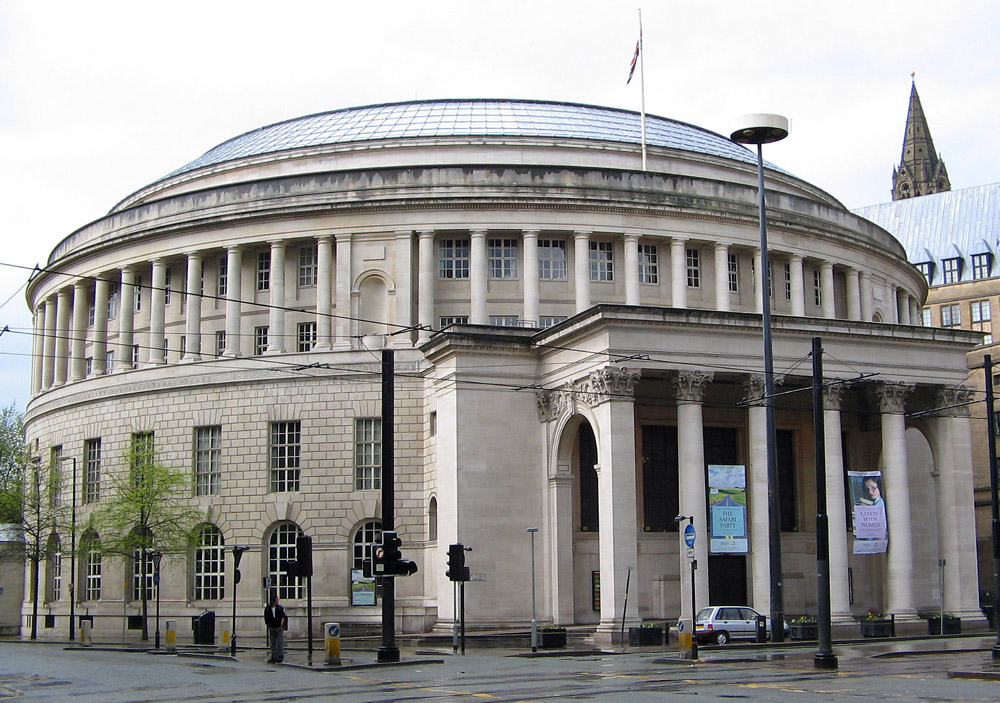
The neoclassical Manchester Central Library.

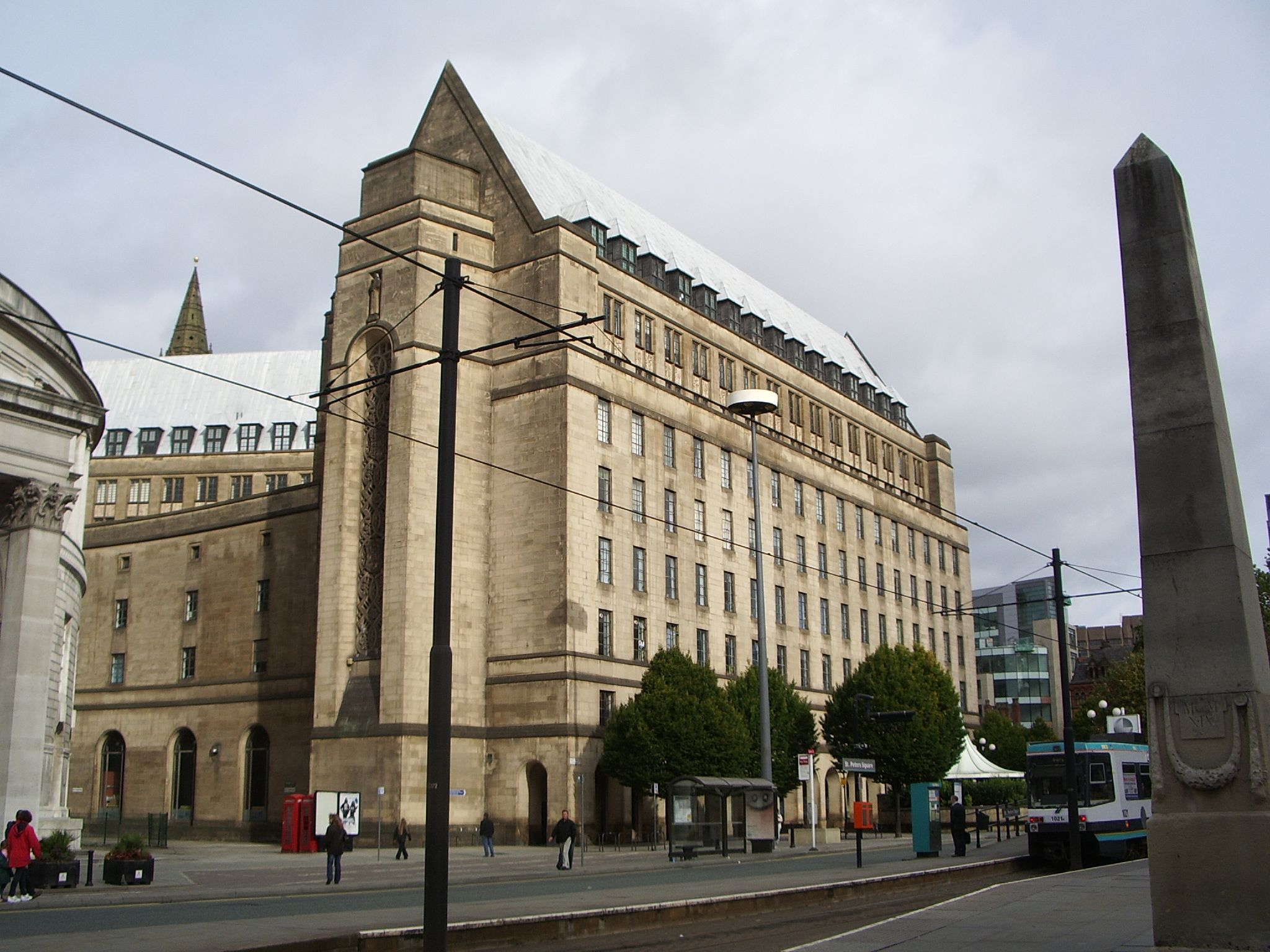
Town Hall Extension and St Peter's Square with trams.

=== Education and culture ===
Education and culture became important in Georgian times leading to the construction of buildings that endure today. The Portico Library designed by Thomas Harrison was the first Greek Revival building in Manchester and the only surviving building by Harrison in the city. Its interior was inspired by John Soane. The Royal Manchester Institution a learned society was founded in 1823. Its home in Mosley Street was designed by Charles Barry, his only public building in the Greek neo-classical style. The building and its collections became Manchester Art Gallery which also incorporates the Manchester Athenaeum, designed in the palazzo style by Barry in 1836.

As Manchester emerged as the world's first industrial city, a Mechanics' Institute, the forerunner of the University of Manchester Institute of Science and Technology, was established in 1824. Owens College, founded with a bequest from John Owens in 1851, became the Victoria University of Manchester in 1880. Alfred Waterhouse was appointed architect for Owens College and the Victoria University where he designed several of its buildings from 1860 until his retirement. An early commission for Owens College was the Manchester Museum on a new site in Chorlton on Medlock. The Whitworth Institute and its surrounding park was founded in 1889 in the name of Sir Joseph Whitworth, one of the city's great industrialists. Designed by J.W. Beaumont in red brick with details in matching terracotta, it was transferred to the university and changed its name to the Whitworth Art Gallery in 1958. Alfred Waterhouse's son, Paul Waterhouse, continued the Gothic tradition with the university's elaborate Whitworth Hall, its ceremonial venue built between 1895 and 1902.

The Manchester School of Art was built in two stages: the main building is by G.T. Redmayne in the neo-Gothic style in stone with gabled wings and pinnacles and an 1897 rear extension by Joseph Gibbon Sankey in red brick and terracotta with Art Nouveau decoration.

The John Rylands Library by Basil Champneys on Deansgate, designed like a church in the Decorated Gothic style with Arts and Crafts details, opened in 1900.

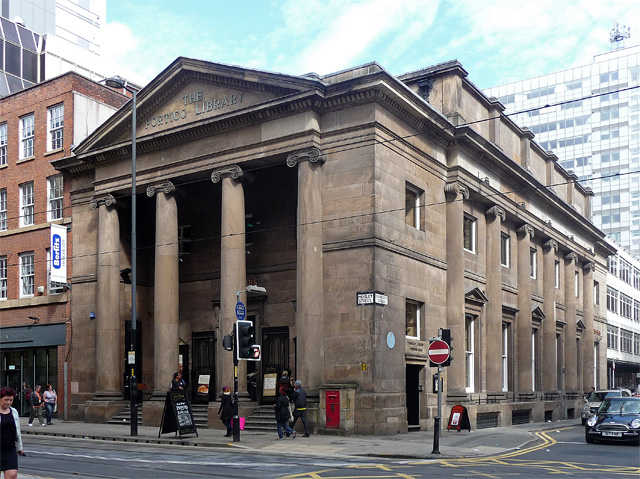
The Portico Library.

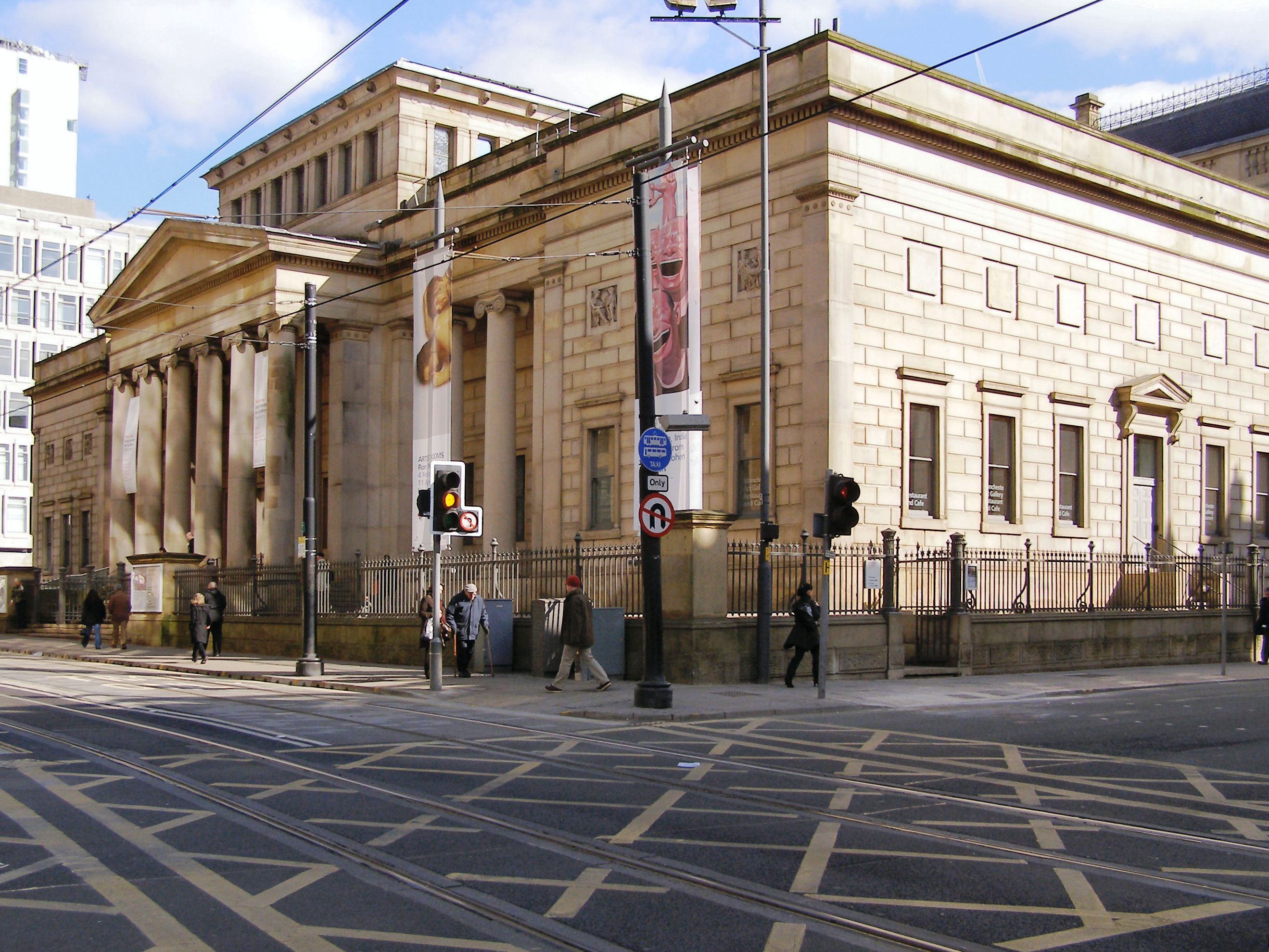
Manchester Art Gallery.

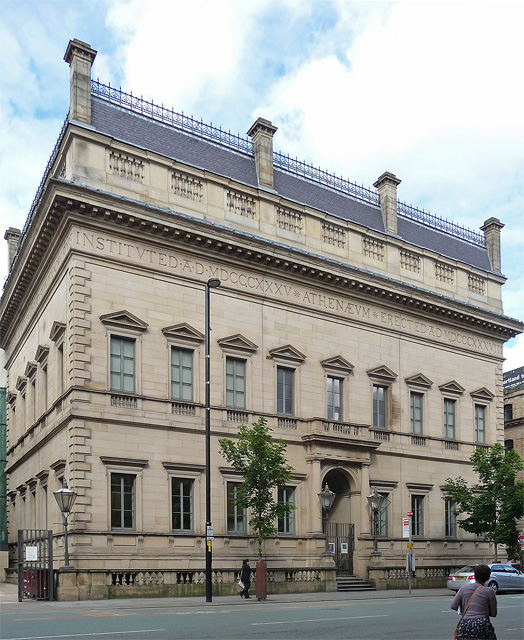
Manchester Athenaeum.

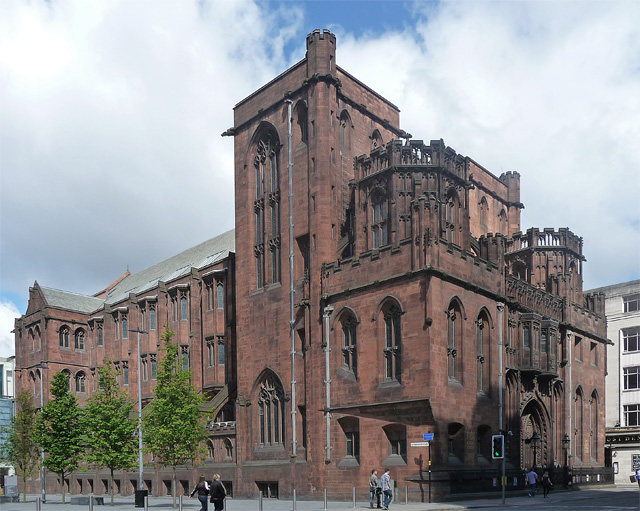
The neogothic John Rylands Library opened in 1900.

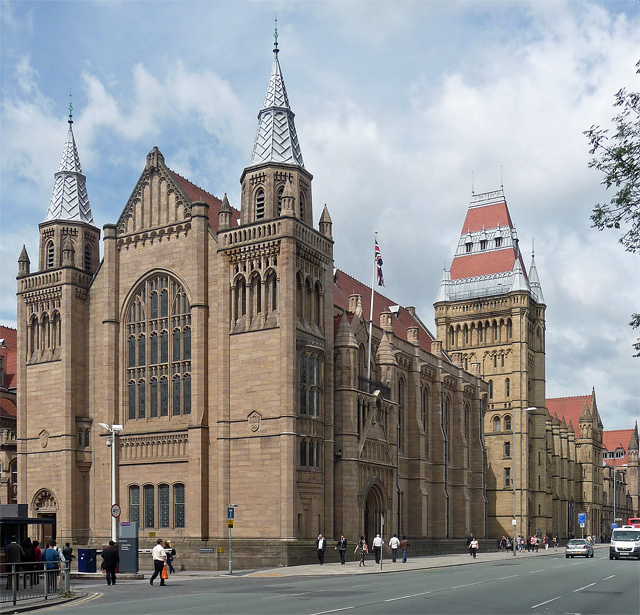
Whitworth Hall opened in 1902.

=== Commerce ===
The commercial hub of Manchester or Cottonopolis was the Exchange, of which there were four, the first was in the market place in 1727 and it was re-built three times. Thomas Harrison built the second in the Greek Revival style between 1806 and 1809 and it was enlarged between 1847 and 1849. Queen Victoria granted it the title the Manchester Royal Exchange in 1851. The third exchange in the Classical style by Mills and Murgatroyd, opened in 1874 and was lavishly re-built Bradshaw Gass & Hope between 1914 and 1921. It had the largest trading room in the world but closed for cotton trading in 1968 and is now a theatre.

Early Victorian warehouses were built of brick with stone dressings typically up to six storeys tall with basements and steps to the front door. Fireproof construction was used towards the end of the century. They had loading bays with hydraulic wall cranes at the side or rear. Some traders built their own warehouses but others shared speculative developments that were built for multiple users. Watts Warehouse by Travis & Mangnall in the form of a Venetian palazzo, was built in 1856, the largest single-occupancy textile warehouse in Manchester.

Warehouses were built into the 20th century, many in the highly decorated Edwardian Baroque style, leaving the city with a legacy of some of the finest buildings of this type in the world. The continuing urbanisation and narrow roads in Manchester have impacted on views of these ornate buildings, many of which were often decorative at the top of the building. A flurry of ornate warehouses were built, many of which dominated the area around Whitworth Street and included Asia House, India House, and Lancaster House, designed by Harry S. Fairhurst.

From the early 19th century, residential King Street and Spring Gardens developed into the city's financial quarter. Banks were designed by local architects Edward Walters, J.E. Gregan and Charles Henry Heathcote and by Charles Cockerell and Edwin Lutyens. Benjamin Heywood's palazzo style bank in St Ann's Square, (the Royal Bank of Scotland), was built in 1848 to the designs of J.E. Gregan. Cockerell designed the Bank of England's Manchester branch on King Street in 1845–46 but the street is dominated by the former Midland Bank designed by Edwin Lutyens in 1928 his major work in the city. The Royal Bank of Scotland on Mosley Street was designed for the Manchester and Salford Bank by Edward Walters in 1862. On the corner of Spring Gardens and York Street is the former Parrs Bank in red sandstone with a corner entrance designed in 1902 by Heathcote in the Edwardian Baroque with Art Nouveau motifs in its ironwork. Heathcote also designed the Baroque Lloyds Bank in 1915 on King Street in the heart of the city's banking district.

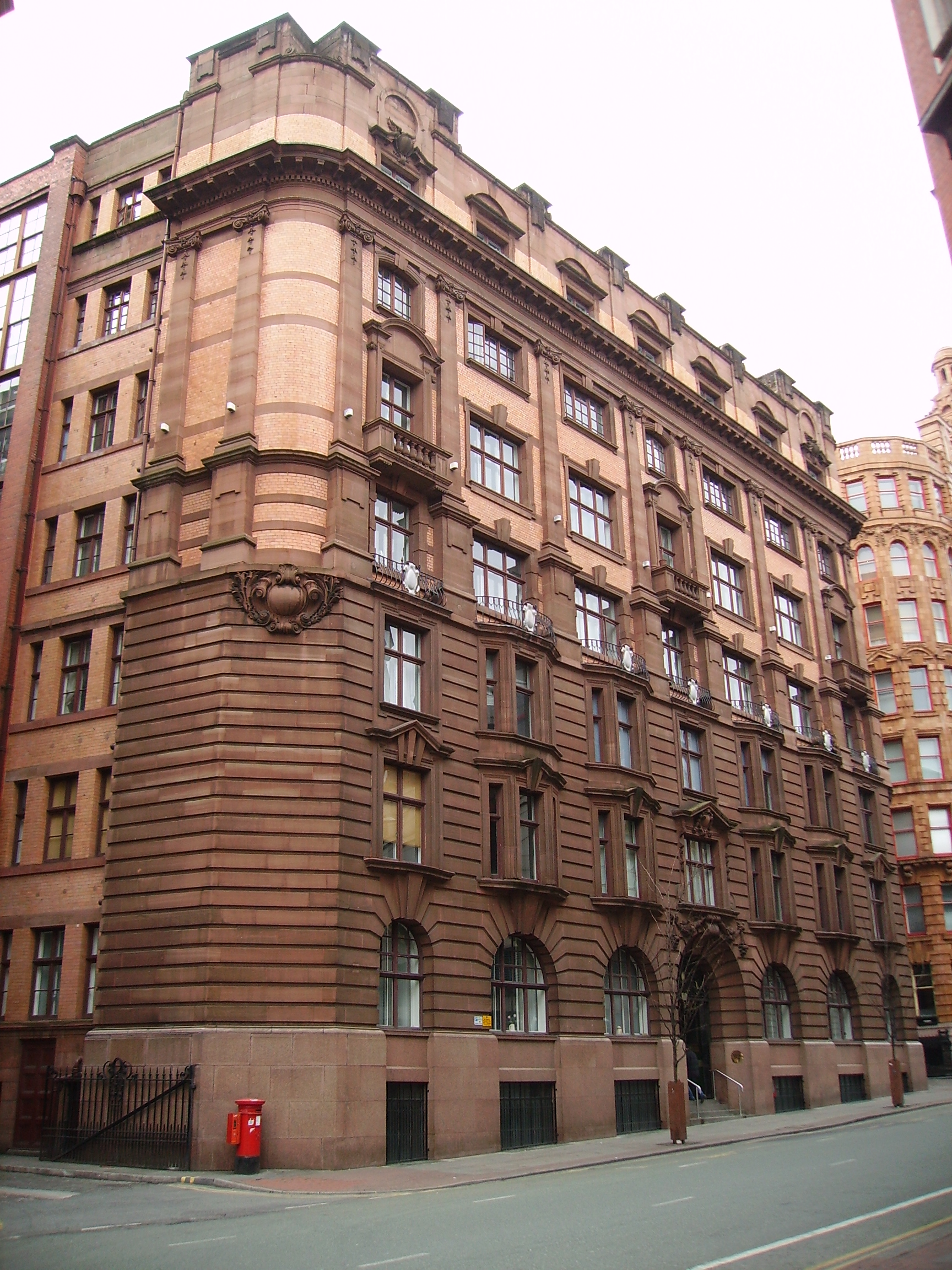
Asia House, opened in 1909.

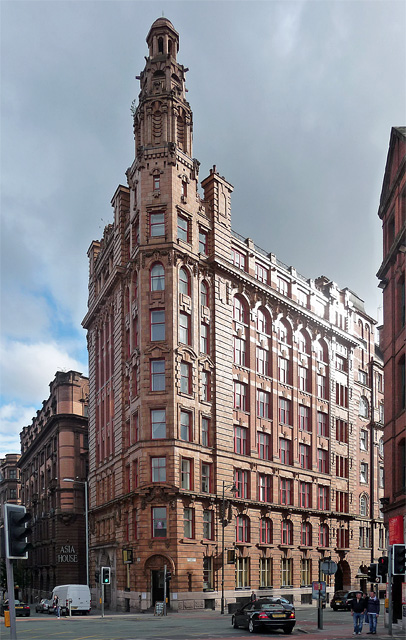
Lancaster House, opened in 1910.

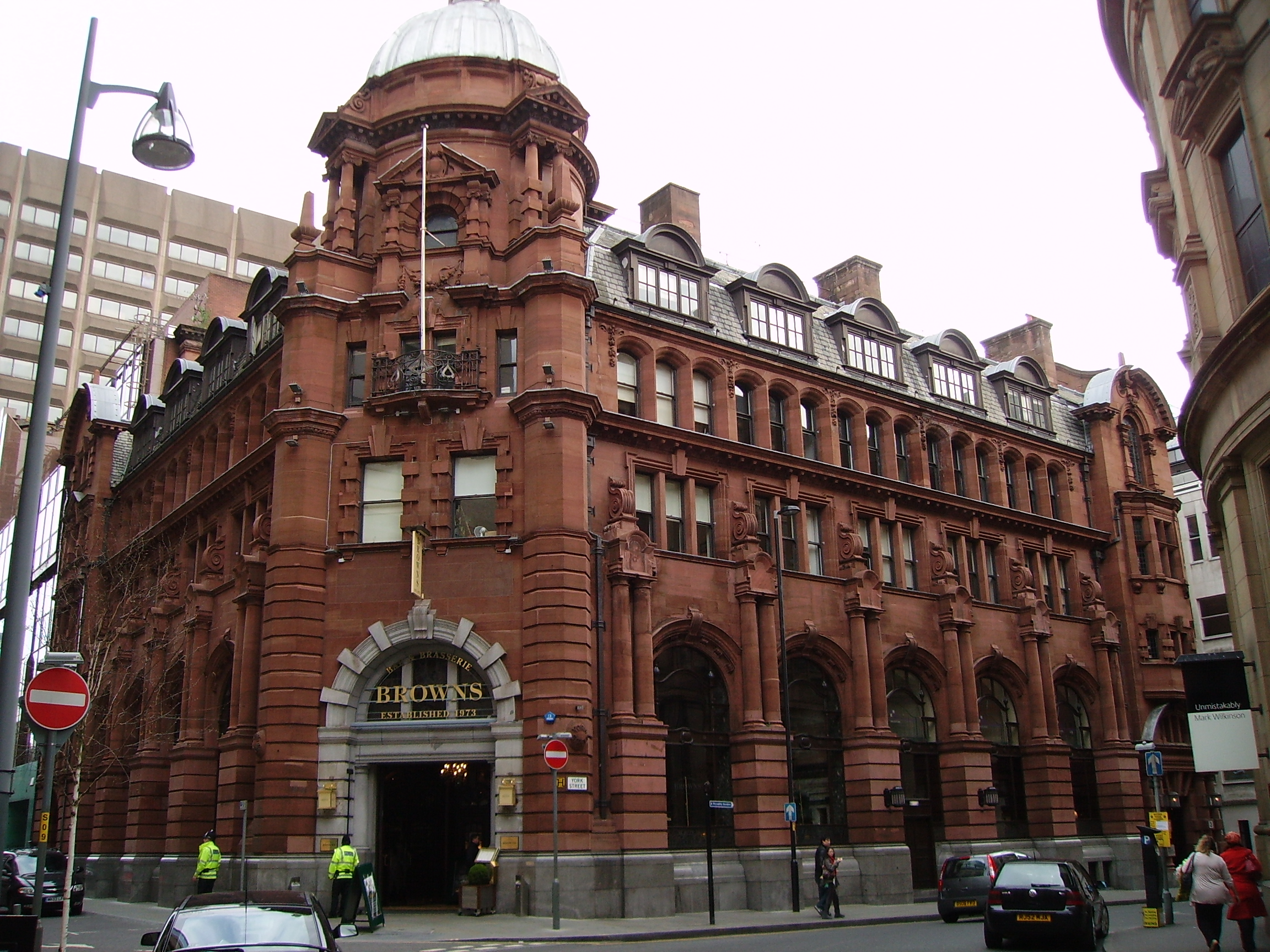
Former National Westminster Bank, 1902.

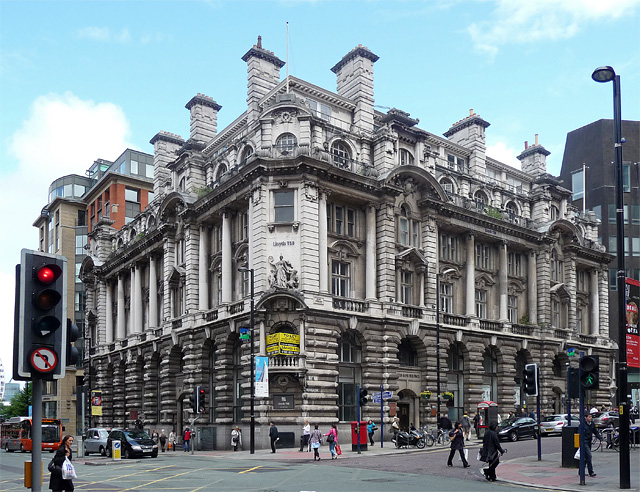
Lloyds Bank opened in 1915.

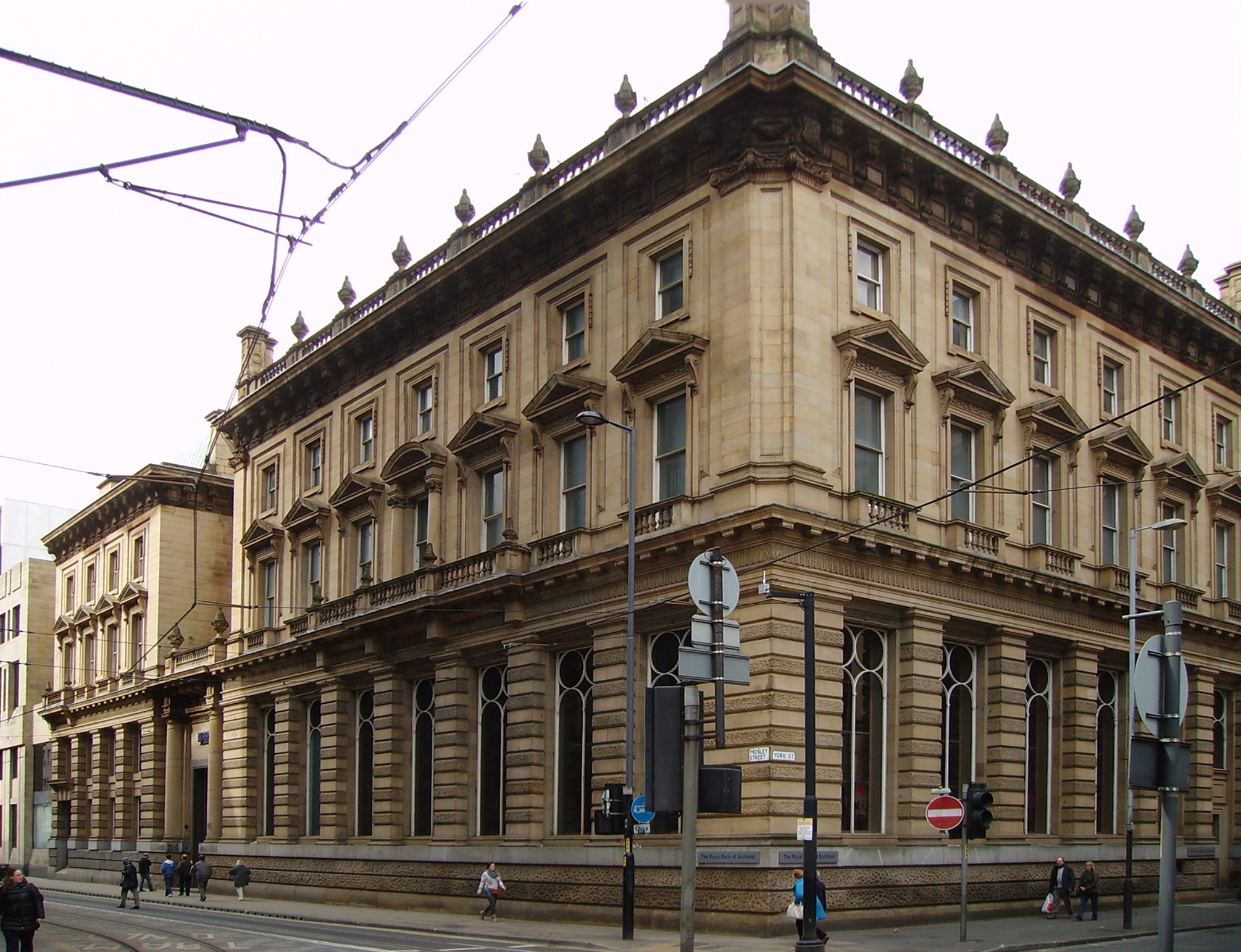
38 and 42 Mosley Street, opened in 1880.

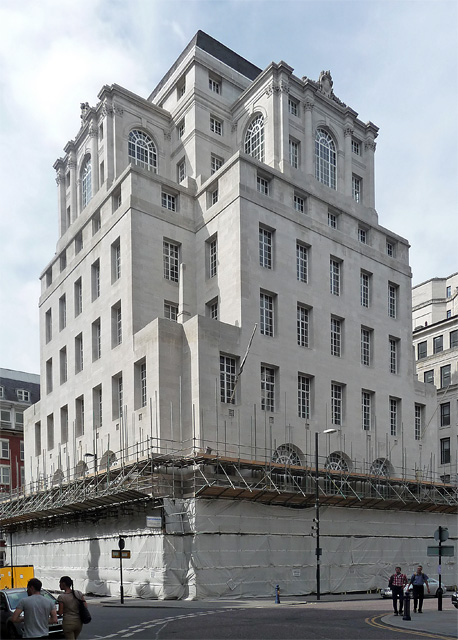
Lutyens' Midland Bank on King Street.

Ship Canal House was completed in 1927 for the Manchester Ship Canal Company by Harry S. Fairhurst in a transitional Edwardian Baroque/Art Deco style. Owen Williams designed the Daily Express Building with a futuristic dark glass façade. Nikolaus Pevsner described it as "all-glass front, absolutely flush, with rounded corners and translucent glass and black glass". Sunlight House which opened in 1932 on Quay Street was designed in the Art Deco style by Joseph Sunlight. The brown-brick Redfern Building on the Co-operative Estate is an individualistic interpretation of the Art Deco, although Pevsner believed it shared more in common with 'Dutch Brick modernism'.

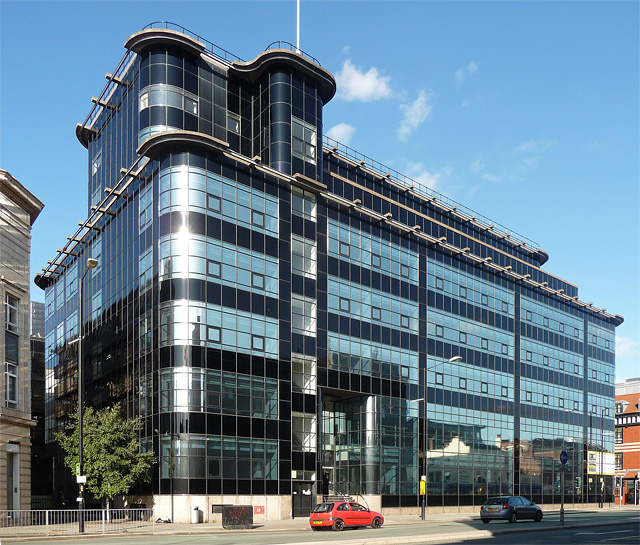
The futuristic Art Deco style Daily Express Building.

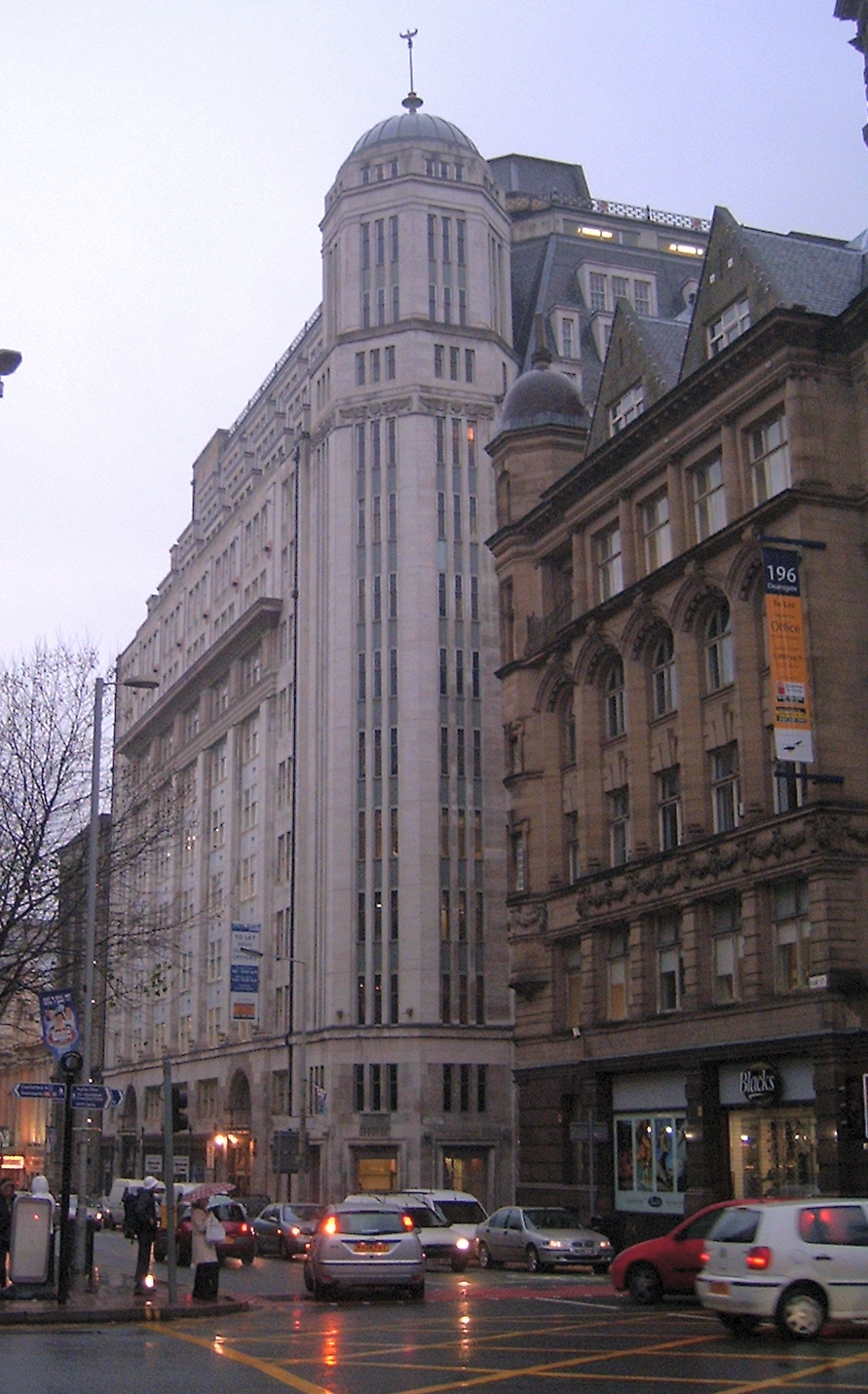
Sunlight House on Quay Street.

=== Places of worship ===
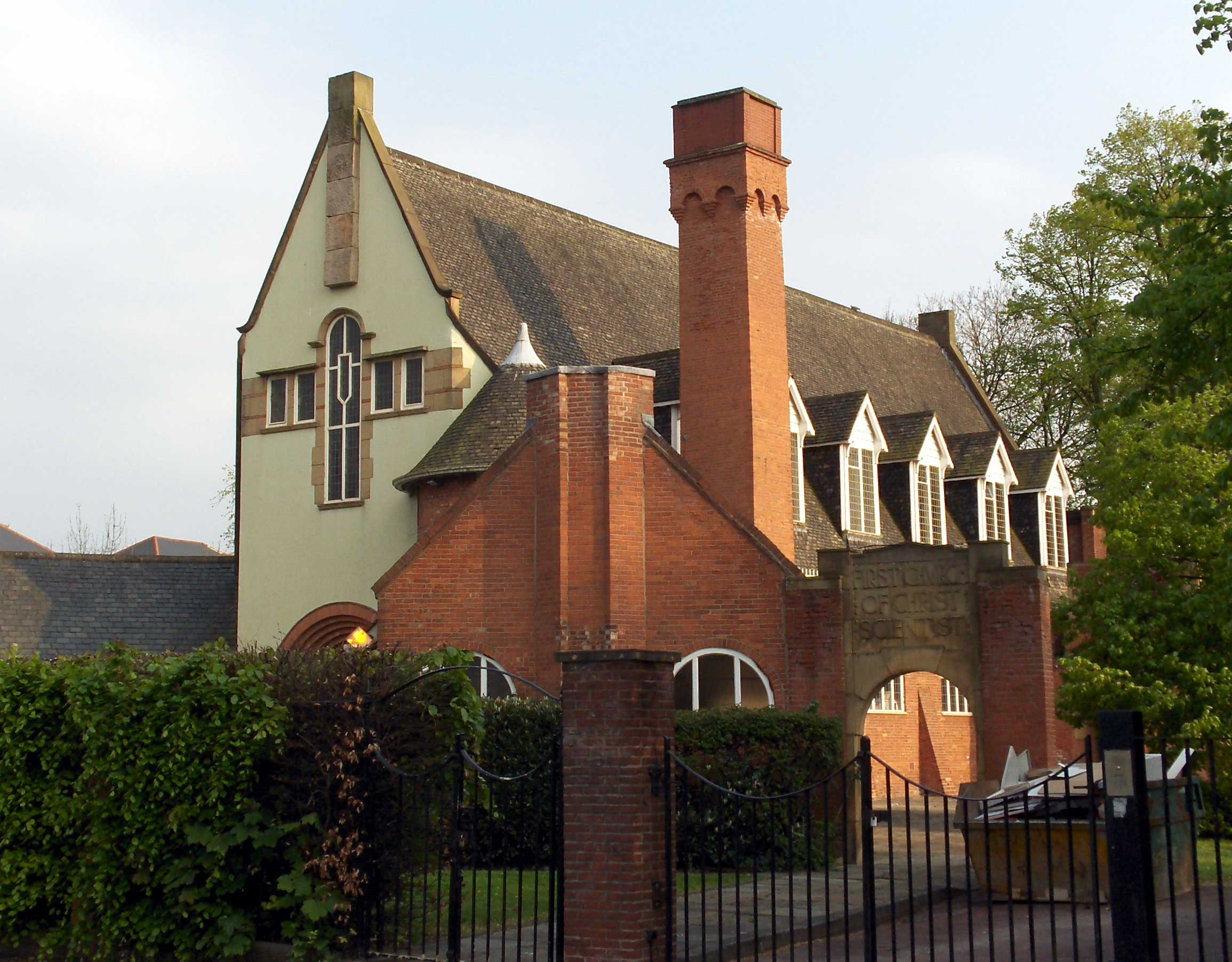
Edgar Wood Centre, opened in 1906 (Grade I)

The medieval parish church was altered and rebuilt between 1814 and 1815. It became a cathedral in 1847 and was extensively restored and rebuilt by J.P. Holden between 1862 and 1868, by J. S. Crowther in the 1880s and in 1898 by Basil Champneys who added annexes in 1903.

In 1828 the Quakers built their Meeting House on Mount Street. Designed by Richard Lane it has an ashlar facade and a three-bay pedimented Ionic portico with a frieze.

Victorian churches, particularly those of the Roman Catholics, espoused the Gothic principles of A. W. N. Pugin who designed the red brick St Wilfrid's Roman Catholic Church in the early English style in Hulme in 1842. St Mary's Roman Catholic Church, The Hidden Gem, on Mulberry Street, the first Roman Catholic church in the city centre, was designed by Weightman & Hadfield in 1848. On the outskirts of the city centre, J. A. Hansom designed the Roman Catholic Church of the Holy Name of Jesus in Chorlton-on-Medlock which was completed 1928 by Adrian Gilbert Scott and E.W. Pugin's Grade II* Church and Friary of St Francis, Gorton Monastery are "of more than local interest".

In the late 19th century, the large Jewish community around Cheetham Hill built the Sephardic Synagogue of 1874–75 to the designs of Edward Salomons in the Moorish style and survives as Manchester Jewish Museum.

The Church of Christ, Scientist in Fallowfield, designed by Edgar Wood opened in 1907. Nikolaus Pevsner considered it "the only religious building in Lancashire that would be indispensable in a survey of twentieth century church design in all England." and "one of the most original buildings of that time in England, or indeed anywhere."

=== Modernism ===
After World War II, work to rebuild war-damaged Manchester began and the transition from warehouse to office blocks accelerated as the city's industrial prowess waned. Few aesthetically memorable buildings were constructed in the 1950s and 1960s, but some grew into landmarks for the city.

The first major building constructed after the war was the Granada Studios complex designed by Ralph Tubbs in 1954. The studios' notable features were a lattice tower and red, neon sign.

When the 118-metre (387 ft) CIS Tower was built in 1962, it was the tallest building in the United Kingdom. The tower by Sir John Bumet, Gordon Tait and Partners with G.S. Hay, is recognised as one of the best 1960s modernist buildings. As home to the Co-operative Group, it was designed to showcase Manchester and the Co-operative movement. It was clad in photovoltaic cells in 2005 and is the tallest listed building in the United Kingdom. Along with New Century House which also opened in 1962, its "design of discipline and consistency which forms part of a group with the Co-operative Insurance Society". Gateway House, a modernist office block designed by Richard Seifert & Partners in 1969 on the approach to Manchester Piccadilly station, is considered to be one of Seifert's most loveable buildings. Hollins College, known as the Toast Rack, is representative of work produced by Manchester's City Council's city architect L. C. Howitt while implementing the city's post-war rebuilding plans.

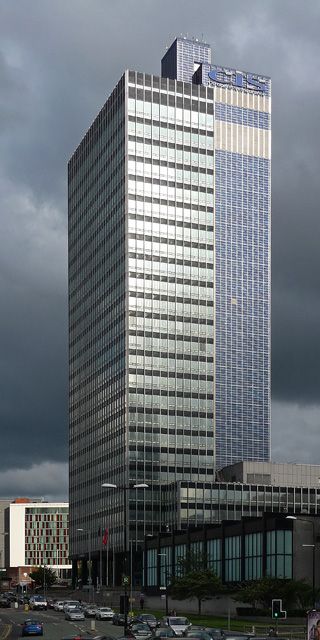
The CIS Tower (1962) was the tallest listed building in the UK.

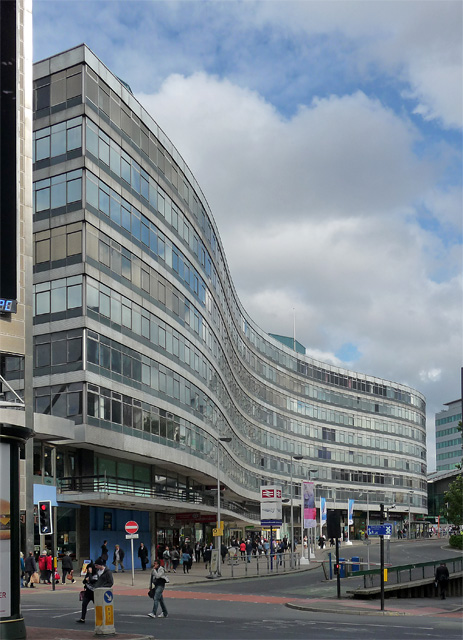
The wavy frontage of Gateway House (1969).

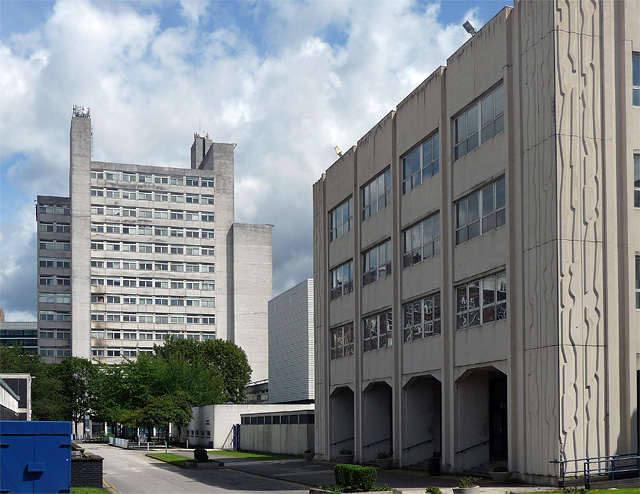
The former UMIST Campus consists of many Modernist buildings built in the 1960s.

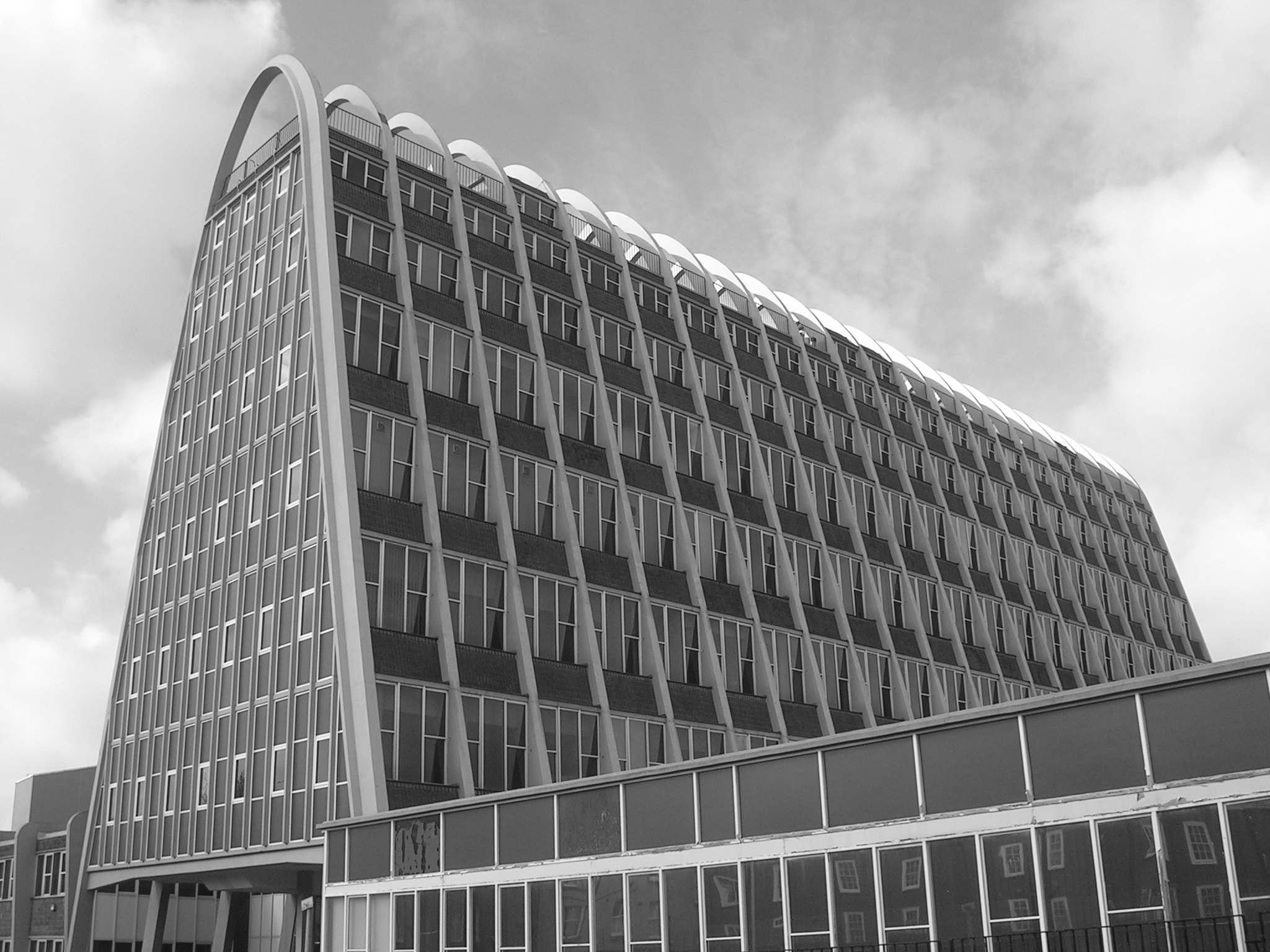
The Grade II Toast Rack building (1960).

=== New millennium architecture ===
After the destruction caused by the 1996 bombing, the city had a chance to reinvent itself. Tall buildings, many in a post-modernist style incorporating glass façades were constructed, the most prominent is a skyscraper built in 2006 – the 168-metre tall Beetham Tower by architecture firm, SimpsonHaugh and Partners. Other buildings with glass incorporated into their design include Urbis, No. 1 Deansgate, the Manchester Civil Justice Centre and the Great Northern Tower, by Assael Architecture. Manchester City Council has been more sympathetic to tall buildings since 1990 and its Manchester Core Strategy 2012–2027 considered 'iconic' developments which reflect the non-conformity and uniqueness of the city would be viewed more sympathetically.

The Manchester Civil Justice Centre was built in 2007 in Spinningfields - Manchester's new business district. It has been well received by architecture critics who praised its aesthetics, environmental credentials and structural quality. The Guardian architecture critic Owen Hatherley described it as a "genuinely striking building".

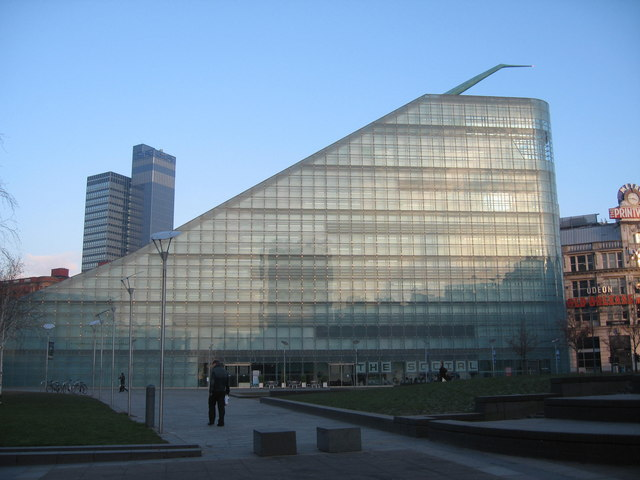
Urbis, 2002.

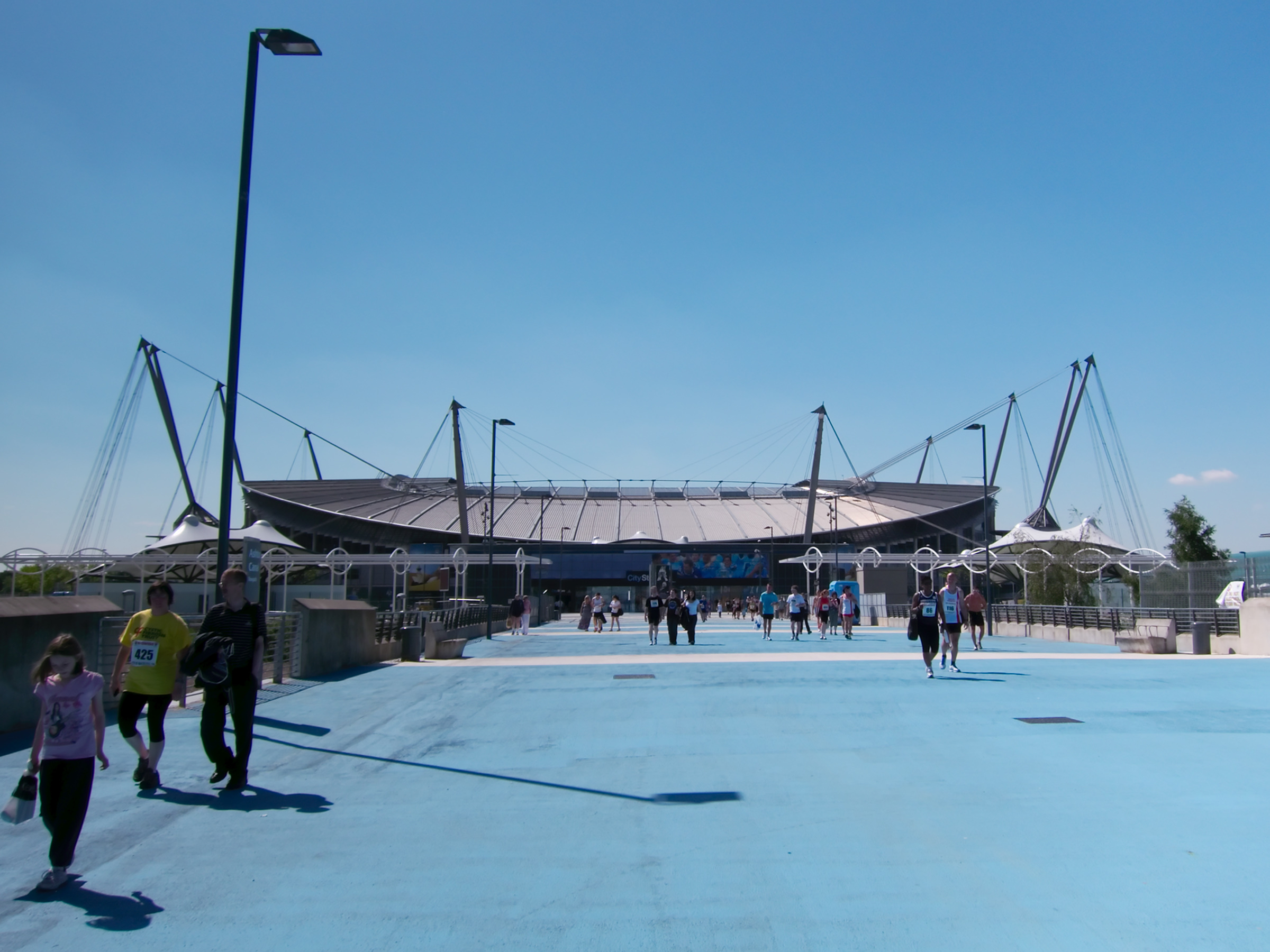
The City of Manchester Stadium, completed in 2001.

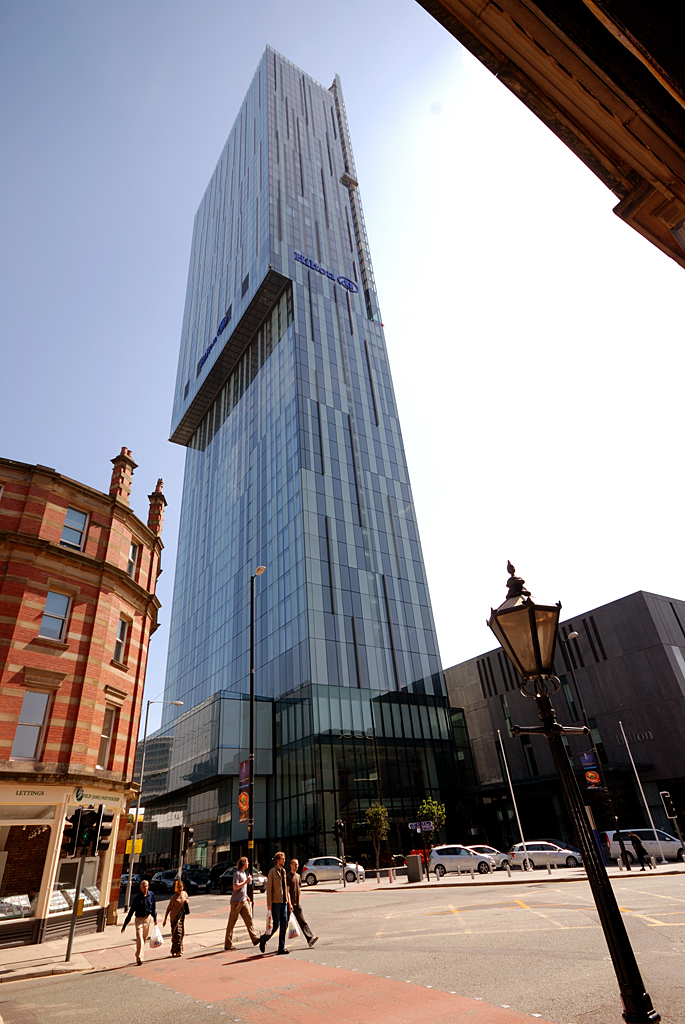
Beetham Tower, 2006.

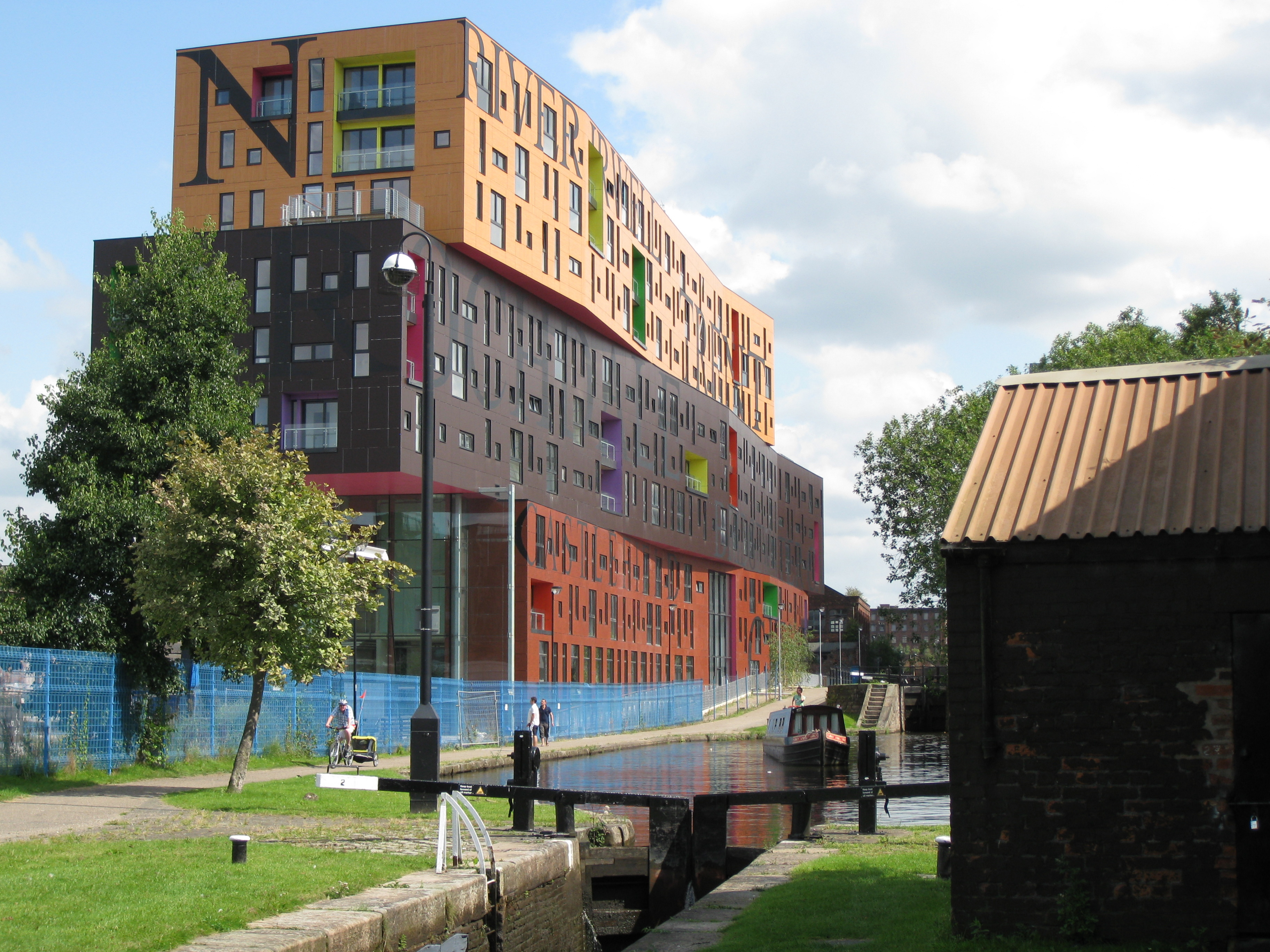
Will Alsop's Chips building in New Islington, 2007.
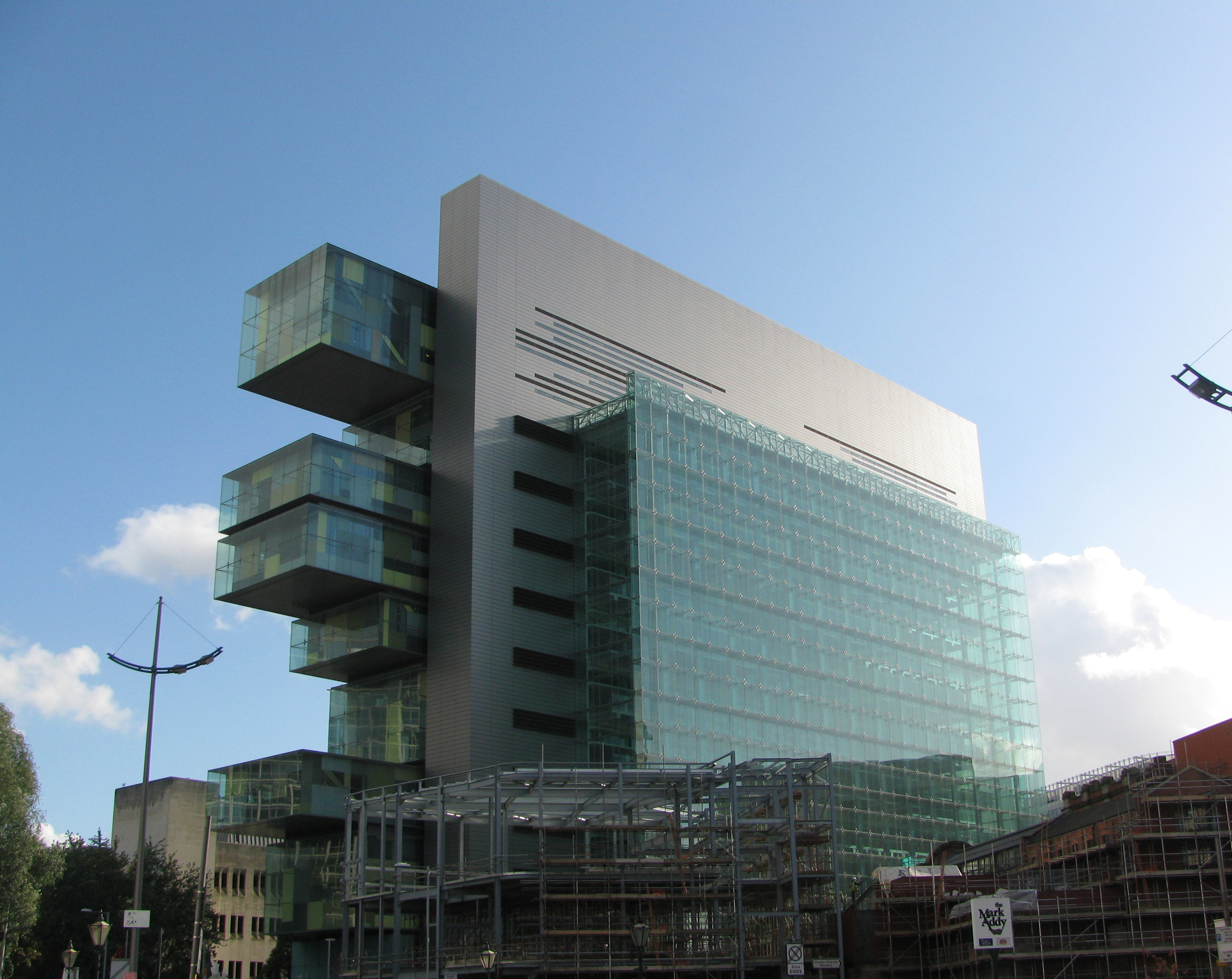
Manchester Civil Justice Centre, 2007.

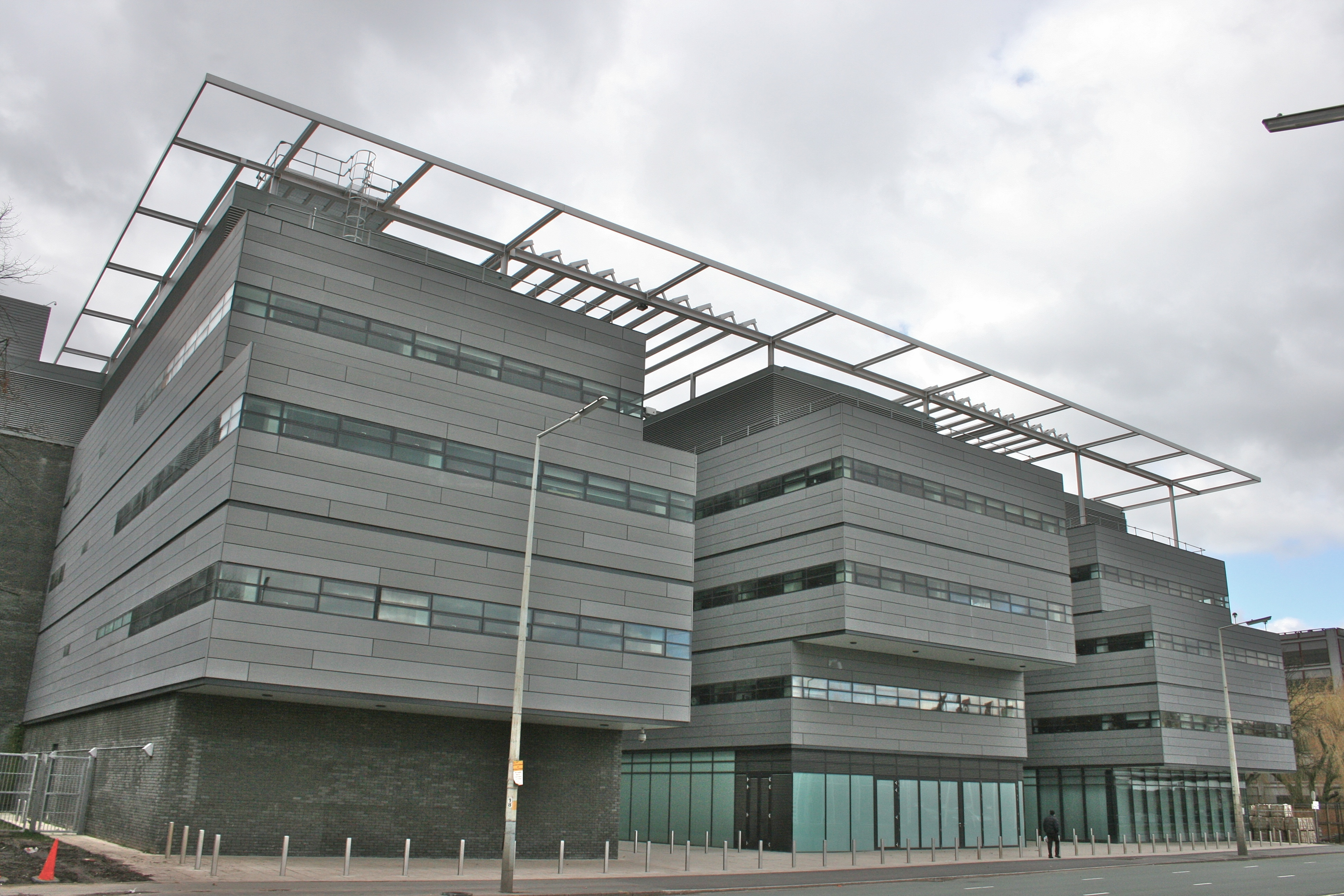
Alan Turing Building, 2007.

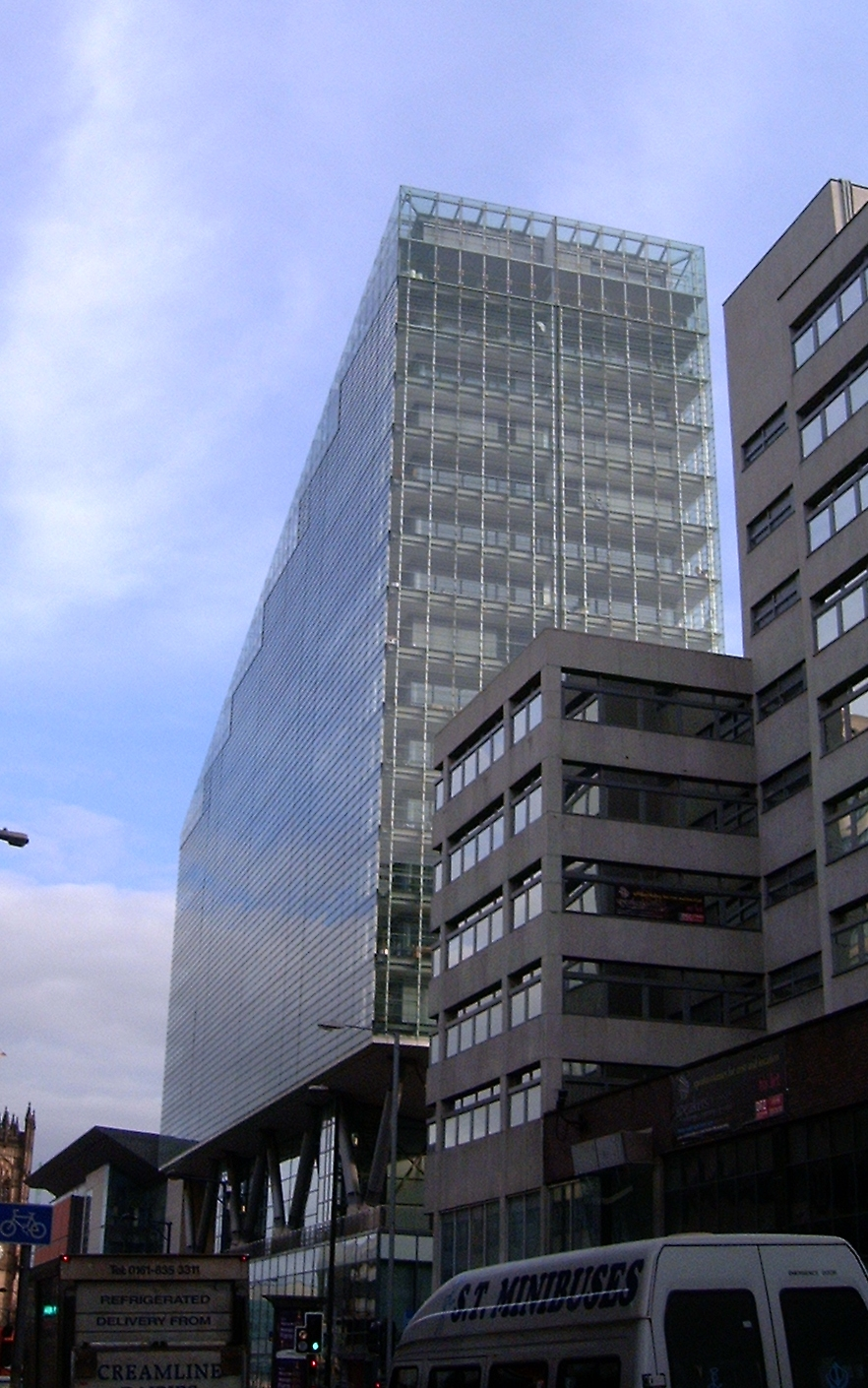
No. 1 Deansgate, 2001.

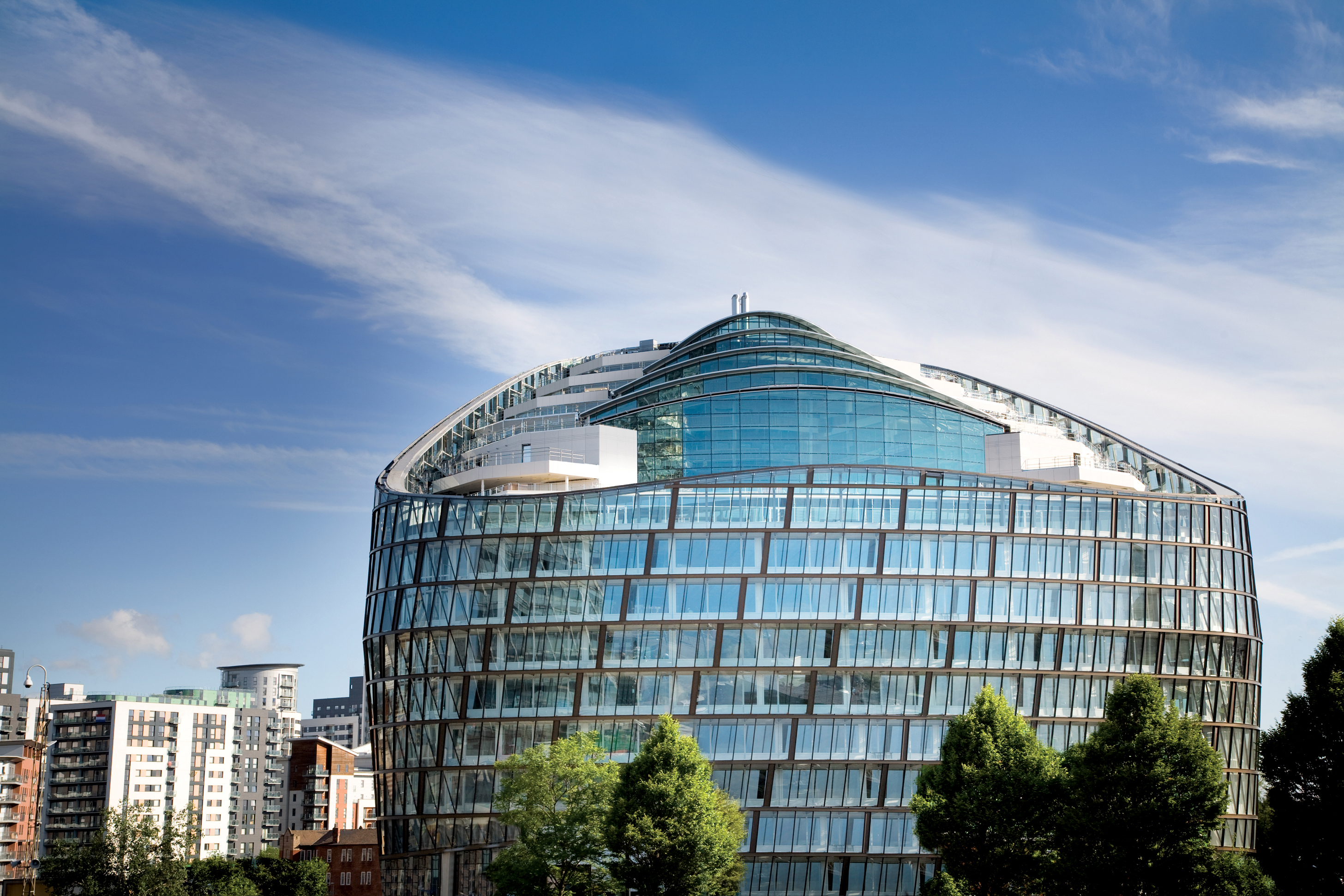
One Angel Square under construction, 2013.

=== Monuments and sculpture ===
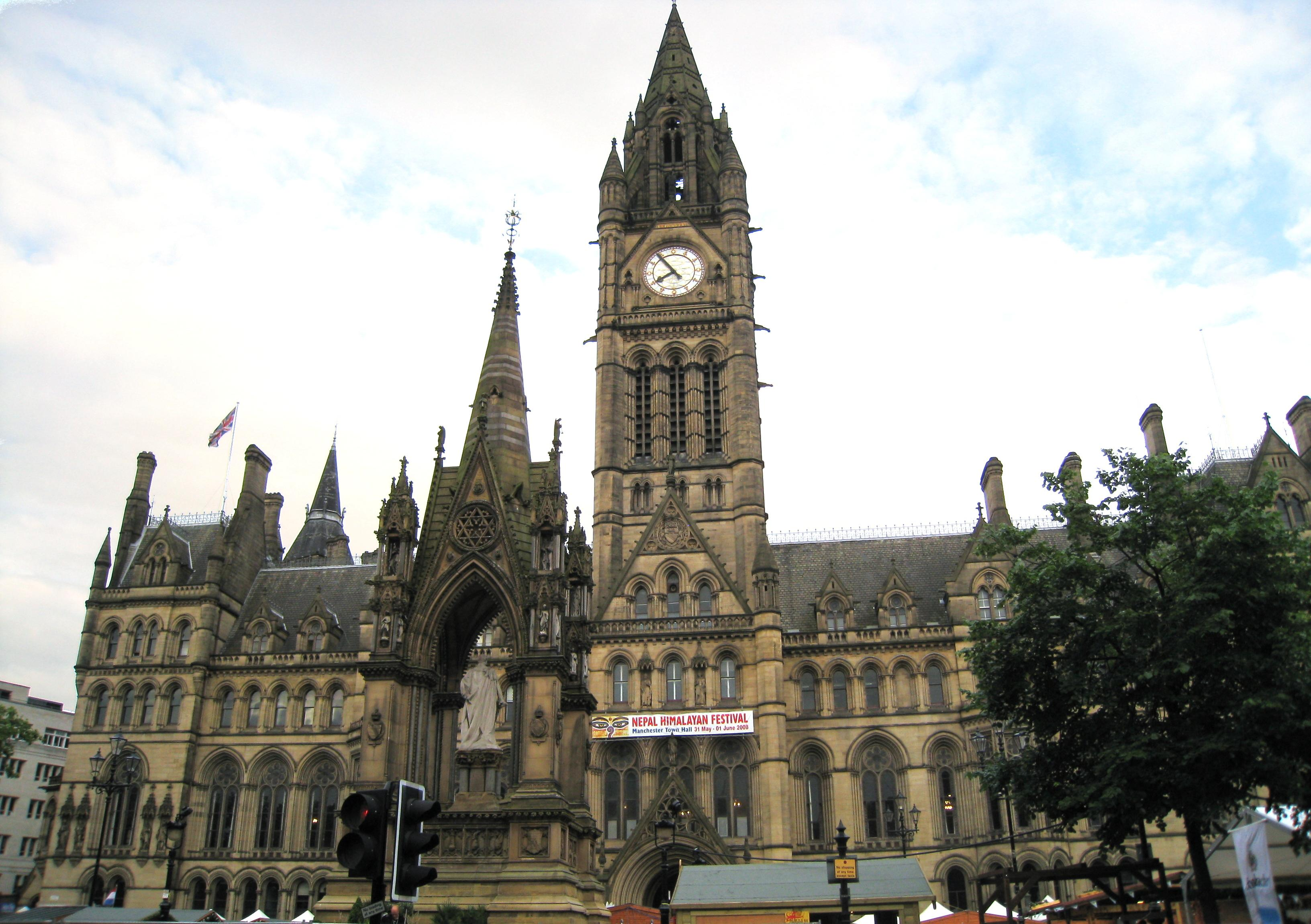
The Albert Memorial, Albert Square

In Manchester are monuments to people and events that have shaped the city and influenced the wider community. Two squares holding many public monuments are Albert Square in front of the town hall which has monuments to Prince Albert, Bishop James Fraser, Oliver Heywood, William Ewart Gladstone and John Bright, and Piccadilly Gardens with monuments to Queen Victoria, Robert Peel, James Watt and The Duke of Wellington.

Notable monuments elsewhere in the city include the Alan Turing Memorial in Sackville Park commemorating the father of modern computing. A monument to Abraham Lincoln by George Gray Barnard in the eponymous Lincoln Square was presented to the city by Mr & Mrs Charles Phelps Taft and marks the part Lancashire played in the American Civil War and its consequence the cotton famine of 1861–1865. In the entrance to Watts Warehouse is a bronze statue, "The Sentry", by Charles Sargeant Jagger, a memorial to the staff of S & J Watts & Co who died in World War I. The city's principal war memorial is the Cenotaph in St Peter's Square, designed by Edwin Lutyens after his original in London.

Thomas Heatherwick's B of the Bang was a 56-metre-tall (184 ft) metal sculpture commissioned for the 2002 Commonwealth Games. Erected near the City of Manchester Stadium in Eastlands, the sculpture was beset by structural problems and dismantled in 2009.

=== Streets and plazas ===
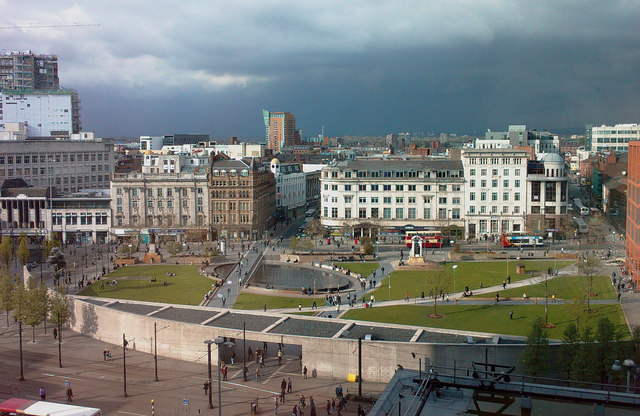
Piccadilly Gardens, redesigned by Tadao Ando in the early 2000s

Manchester has a number of squares, plazas and shopping streets many of which are pedestrianised and other streets have Metrolink or bus priority.

One of the oldest thoroughfares is Market Street, originally Market Stede Lane. Much of the medieval street pattern around the original market place was cleared in 1970s developments. Ancient streets such as Smithy Door were lost. One ancient survivor is Long Millgate, a winding lane, leading north from the old market place across Fennel Street to Todd Street (formerly Toad Lane – thought to be a corruption of T'owd Lane, or The Old Lane), an attractive and peaceful thoroughfare bounded by gardens.

Whitworth Street is a broad 19th-century road from London Road to Deansgate, running parallel to the Rochdale Canal for much of its length, intersecting Princess Street, Chepstow Street and Albion Street (the western section is called Whitworth Street West). It is lined with impressive former warehouses now converted to residential use. Mosley Street runs roughly parallel to Portland Street, Whitworth Street and Deansgate, from Piccadilly Gardens to St Peter's Square. It is closed to traffic as Metrolink trams run along its length. Another Victorian addition to the city's street pattern was Corporation Street, which cut through slums to the north of Market Street providing a direct route from Cross Street and Albert Square to the routes north of the city. South-east of the city centre Wilmslow Road runs from Oxford Road, the hub of student life and home to Manchester's curry mile in Rusholme.

Other notable places in Manchester include: Great Northern Square, Lincoln Square, Spring Gardens, Cathedral Gardens, Whitworth Gardens, New Cathedral Street, the Gay Village and Chinatown.

== Architects ==
The Manchester School of Architecture is jointly administered by the University of Manchester and Manchester Metropolitan University. Contemporary architects born or educated in Manchester include Roger Stephenson, Stephen Hodder, Norman Foster.

Manchester has historically had a large architecture practice presence in comparison to other British cities however this presence burgeoned during the redevelopment of the city since the 1996 bombing. Architecture practices with head offices in the city include BDP, SimpsonHaugh and Partners, Urban Splash, Stephen Hodder Architects, Stephenson Architects, Leach Rhodes Walker and 5plus Architects. Practices with regional offices include Arup, Aedas, AHR, Aecom, Broadway Malyan, Capita Symonds and Chapman Taylor.

More recently, practices such as Denton Corker Marshall, Mecanoo, Hawkins\Brown, Feilden Clegg Bradley and Donald Insall Associates have opened offices in Manchester since the Great Recession recovery.

== See also ==
- Manchester cotton warehouses
- Tallest buildings in Manchester
- Warehouses in Manchester
- Grade I listed buildings in Greater Manchester
- Listed buildings in Manchester-M1
