= Brunswick Hotel, Manchester =

Listed pub in England

Brunswick Hotel
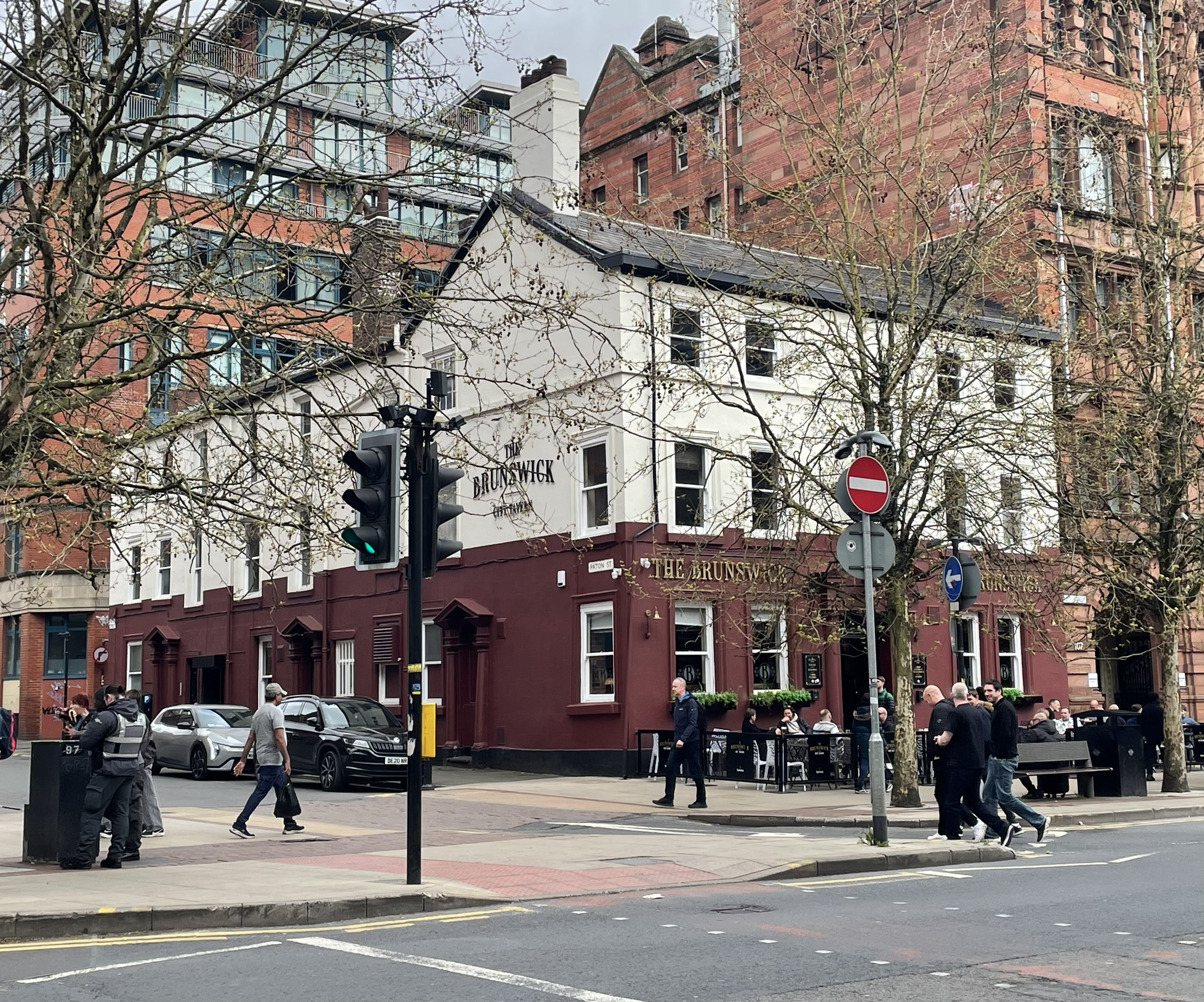
- The pub in 2026
- Alternative names: The Brunswick

General information
- Type: Public house (originally a hotel with two adjoining townhouses)
- Location: 97 Piccadilly, Manchester, England
- Coordinates: 53.4800°N 2.2333°W
- Year built: Early 19th century

Design and construction
- Designations

Listed Building – Grade II
- Official name: The Brunswick Hotel
- Designated: 3 October 1974
- Reference no.: 1271113

Other information
- Public transit: Manchester Piccadilly

The Brunswick Hotel (now trading as The Brunswick) is a Grade II listed public house at the corner of Piccadilly and Paton Street Manchester, England. Built in the early 19th century, the property originally comprised a hotel with two adjoining townhouses, which were later combined and adapted for use as licensed premises.

== History ==
The Brunswick Hotel was originally constructed as a hotel accompanied by two adjoining townhouses on Paton Street. Over time, the three properties were combined and adapted for use as licensed premises. The building has since undergone various alterations, and it now operates solely as a public house.

There are differing accounts of the building's origins. The official listing from Historic England dates the existing structure to the early 19th century. In contrast, some local reporting states that a pub called the Brunswick has occupied the site since the 1790s, implying that an earlier building may have stood there before the present one was constructed. This difference may reflect the distinction between the long‑standing use of the site as an inn and the later construction date of the current building.

A map of Manchester and Salford published in 1832 shows a building at the corner of Booth Street (now Paton Street) and Piccadilly, but it is not identified as an inn, hotel, or public house. Other premises on Piccadilly are labelled as such, including the Flying Horse Inn and the Albion Hotel.

According to one account, although the building is now overshadowed by later neighbouring development, it is described as the only surviving remnant of the structures that originally lined this part of the road when it was built.

On 3 October 1974, the pub was designated a Grade II listed building.

In 2023 proposals were submitted to Manchester City Council by its owners, Trust Inns, to refurbish the building and create guest accommodation on the upper floors. The plans include restoring historic features while adapting the interior for modern use, with the stated aim of securing the building's long‑term future. The Brunswick continues to operate as a pub near Manchester Piccadilly station.

== Architecture ==
=== Exterior ===
The building is finished with scored plaster over brick and has a slate roof. Its layout forms an L‑shape, with a main block that is two rooms deep and has a rear extension, continuing toward the back alongside Nos. 2 and 4 Paton Street. It has three floors plus cellars, with four evenly spaced front windows and a central entrance reached by two steps. The central doorway is framed by a Tuscan-style doorcase with pilasters and an open pediment, and the fanlight above it has been filled in. Each floor has two windows on either side of the entrance; the ground‑floor windows contain multiple small panes, while those above are sash windows without dividing bars. A chimney rises from the left end of the building.

The left side wall includes another opening originally used as a doorway, now converted into a window, along with several windows arranged in a similar style to the front. Nos. 2 and 4 Paton Street, which adjoin at the rear, follow the same general pattern in their doors and windows.

=== Interior ===
To the right of the bar is the main lounge area, and towards the back there is a raised section on the right with a smaller seating area to the left. The pub also has an outdoor seating area on the pavement.

== See also ==
- Listed buildings in Manchester-M1
- Listed pubs in Manchester
