= Dale Street Warehouse =

Listed warehouse in Manchester, England

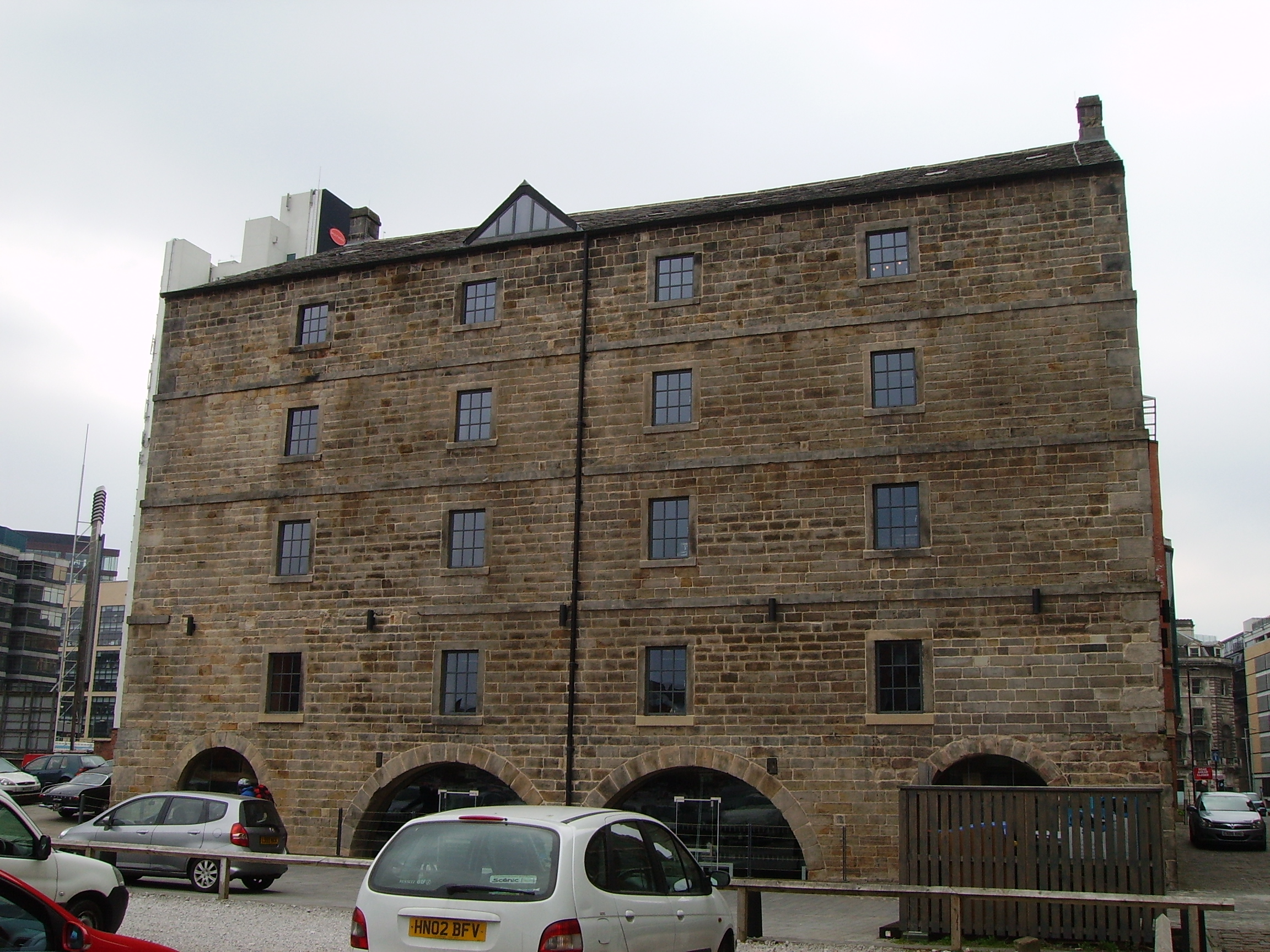
- Dale Street (now Carver's) Warehouse in 2011

- Location within Greater Manchester
- Alternative names: Carver's Warehouse; Dale Warehouse

General information
- Location: Dale Street, Manchester, England
- Coordinates: 53.4803°N 2.2319°W
- Year built: 1806
- Renovated: 1824 (water wheel added)

Design and construction
- Architect: William Crossley
- Designations

Listed Building – Grade II*
- Official name: Dale Warehouse
- Designated: 10 November 1972
- Reference no.: 1200845

Dale Street Warehouse (officially listed as Dale Warehouse and now known as Carver's Warehouse) is an early 19th-century warehouse in the Piccadilly Basin area of Manchester city centre, England. Built in 1806 and attributed to the engineer William Crossley, it is the earliest surviving canal warehouse in the city, and a Grade II* listed building. It formed part of the Rochdale Canal Company's operations during the mid‑19th century and later spent many years in commercial use. After a long period of decline, it was restored and converted into office space and a café, and now operates under the name Carver's Warehouse.

== History ==
The warehouse was built in 1806, a date recorded on the keystone of a window in the north gable, and is attributed to William Crossley. It originally operated with a water wheel installed in 1824 to support its industrial functions.

By 1849 the canal basins around the site were far more extensive, and the Dale Street Warehouse formed part of the Rochdale Canal Company's operations, with canal arms running directly to it and to the company's main office.

On 10 November 1972, Dale Warehouse was designated a Grade II* listed building.

For many years the building operated as a shop and was described in 2000 as "sadly neglected"; it has since been converted into office space and a café, and is now known as Carver's Warehouse.

== Architecture ==
The warehouse is constructed of watershot sandstone blocks with dressed stone details and a slate roof. It has a rectangular plan running north to south, with two shipping openings in the rear east wall and the former water wheel positioned near the south end. The building rises four storeys above a basement and contains timber floors supported throughout by cast‑iron columns, a structural arrangement that is now unique among Manchester's surviving warehouses. The base includes four boatholes that once allowed boats to unload directly inside the building. It originally operated with a water wheel installed in 1824 to support its industrial functions.

The original west front, now mostly hidden by later sheds, appears to have been arranged symmetrically with a slightly projecting centre and included a plinth, corner stones, horizontal bands at each level, a cornice and a parapet. Most window openings have raised sills and plain surrounds, though many are now bricked up. At the south end of the ground floor is a segmental loading doorway with the remains of a wall‑mounted crane beside it. The roof has small skylights and gable‑end chimneys.

The north gable has three windows on each floor and a Venetian window in the attic with a dated keystone, along with original small‑paned glazing in the attic and the two windows below. The south gable, now the main entrance front, has a round‑arched doorway reached by steps, flanked by two rectangular windows, and above it a tall arched loading opening with doors at each level up to the attic, the uppermost beneath a hoist canopy. The rear elevation has two semi-circular shipping openings in the centre, a round‑arched doorway to the left, four windows on each upper floor, and a small gable over the left‑hand windows.

=== Interior ===
Inside, the warehouse is arranged with two lines of cast‑iron columns that support long, curved iron plates carrying the timber floors. The lower parts of the columns are octagonal, while those on the upper levels have built‑in flanges that once held shuttering boards. Beneath the south end lies a wheel‑pit running parallel to the wall, containing a 16-foot (4.9 m) breast‑shot waterwheel made by T. C. Hewes. The wheel retains its hub gearing, fragments of its timber spokes, and a mix of wrought‑iron and wooden buckets. It powered hoists in the warehouse and in a former neighbouring warehouse through a line‑shaft tunnel that largely survives under the present car park.

== See also ==
- Grade II* listed buildings in Greater Manchester
- Listed buildings in Manchester-M1

== Bibliography ==
- Pevsner, Nikolaus; Hartwell, Clare & Hyde, Matthew, The Buildings of England: Lancashire - Manchester and the South East (2004) Yale University Press
- Hartwell, Claire Pevsner Architectural Guides: Manchester (2001) Yale University Press
