= 24–28 Dale Street =

Listed terrace in Manchester, England

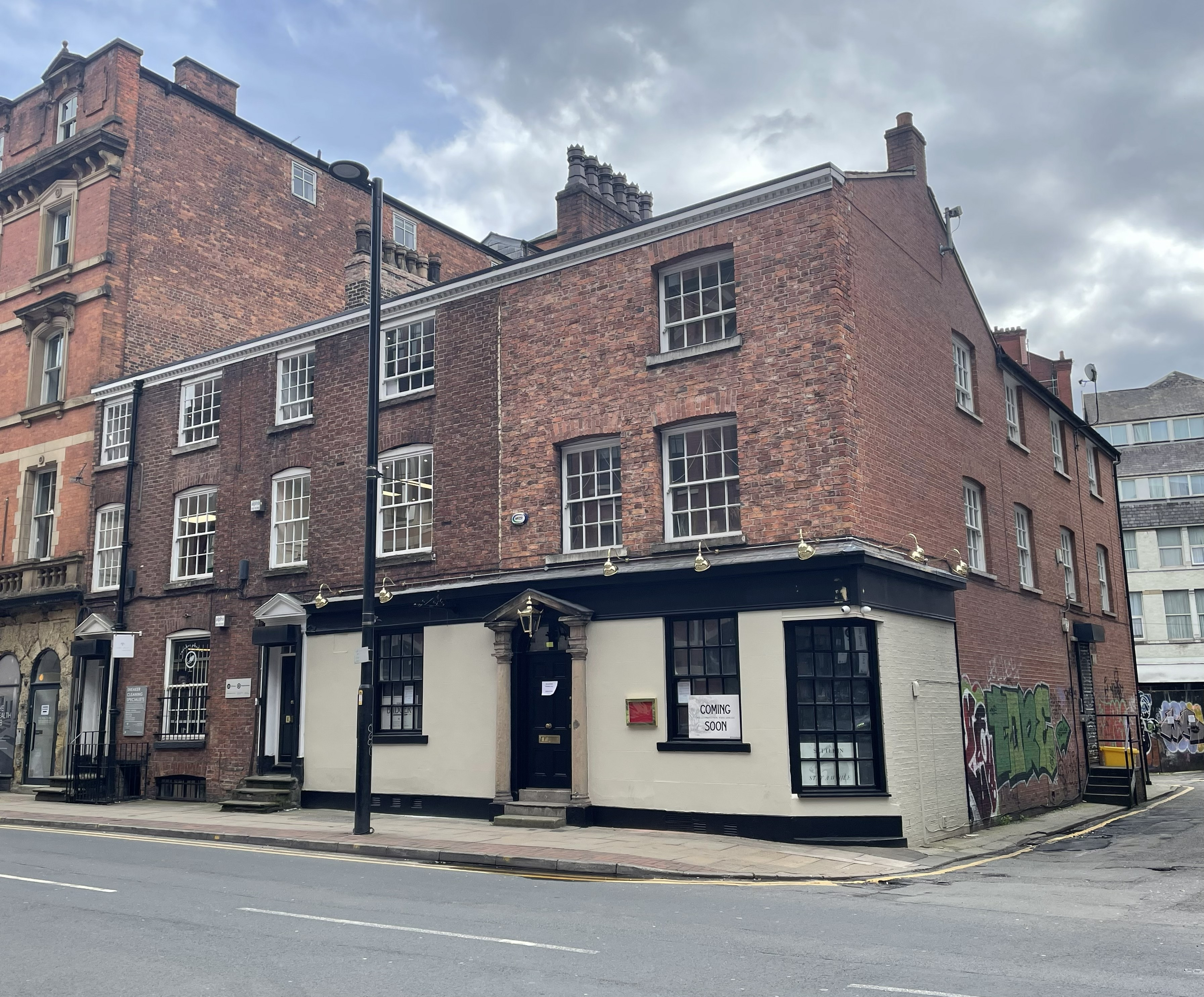
- The terrace in 2026; No. 24 is on the right

General information
- Type: Offices, public house, retail
- Location: Dale Street, Northern Quarter, Manchester, England
- Coordinates: 53.4816°N 2.2340°W
- Year built: Late 18th century

Design and construction
- Designations

Listed Building – Grade II
- Official name: Nos. 24, 26, and 28, Dale Street
- Designated: 3 October 1974
- Reference no.: 1209604

Other information
- Public transit: Manchester Piccadilly

Website
- thebadgermcr.com

24–28 Dale Street is a Grade II listed terrace in the Northern Quarter area of Manchester, England. Built in the late 18th century as three individual townhouses, the buildings have since been altered and now contain The Badger public house at ground‑floor level in No. 24, with offices above and further retail and office accommodation in the adjoining units.

== History ==
The terrace was built in the late 18th century as three separate townhouses, and has been altered at various points since, including changes to the internal layout, the combination of two of the units, and modifications to the ground‑floor openings.

The building at 24 Dale Street was in use as the Haunch of Venison public house throughout the mid-19th and early 20th centuries, with occupants recorded in trade directories between the 1840s and the 1910s. It later became Nickleby's, a pub that remained in operation until its closure in the late 1990s. On 3 October 1974, Nos. 24–28 were designated a Grade II listed building.

After Nickleby's closed, the premises were refurbished and used as offices by Knights Fashion Agencies, a clothing importer. A new bar, Allotment, opened in No. 24 in 2014 and traded until it was replaced in 2021 by the bar and restaurant HerdNQ, which closed in August 2023. The unit was then occupied by a bar called Calcio, which remained active until December 2025.

In March 2026 it was reported that the operators of the Crown and Kettle would take over the former Calcio space and open a pub called The Badger. The remainder of the terrace, excluding the pub, contains retail space at ground‑floor and basement level, with offices occupying the two upper floors.

== Architecture ==
The terrace is built of brick, with the ground floor of Nos. 24 and 26 finished in textured render. It has a slate roof and an L‑shaped plan made up of a main block and a rear wing. Nos. 24 and 26 were originally two small, separate houses, but they have since been combined so that No. 24 now occupies the full width of both plots. It has three floors above a cellar, and the front has been altered over time, including changes to the number and arrangement of windows. A continuous wooden feature runs along the top of the front wall.

No. 24 has an arched entrance framed by attached columns and a decorative top, set at the centre of the combined property. The ground‑floor openings have been altered, and one corner has been chamfered to make room for an added window. The entrances to Nos. 26 and 28 are rectangular and set within shaped surrounds with triangular tops. They stand slightly above street level and are reached by short flights of steps, one of which retains its original metal railings.

On the first floor, the windows have gently curved tops, and most retain their older sash frames, though some have been replaced. The upper floor windows are also traditional sliding types. There are chimney stacks along the roofline and another at the gable end. At the back, a three‑storey wing continues the same general style and window pattern.

== See also ==
- Listed buildings in Manchester-M1
- Listed pubs in Manchester
