= Listed buildings in Manchester-M1 =

List of English historic buildings

Manchester is a city in Northwest England. The M1 postcode area of the city includes part of the city centre, in particular the Northern Quarter, the area known as Chinatown, and part of the district of Chorlton-on-Medlock. The postcode area contains 195 listed buildings that are recorded in the National Heritage List for England. Of these, 14 are listed at Grade II*, the middle of the three grades, and the others are at Grade II, the lowest grade.

The area was an important commercial centre, and this is reflected in the listed buildings, as more than half of them originated as warehouses built mainly in the second half of the 19th century and the first quarter of the 20th century. These buildings also reflect the commercial wealth in the city at this time as many are elaborately decorated and designed in a variety of architectural styles, including Classical, Baroque, Romanesque, Gothic, and Edwardian Baroque. Some are in the form of an Italian palazzo, and one is in the form of a Scottish Baronial castle. Most of the warehouses have since been converted for other purposes, including offices, shops, hotels, and apartments. Industry in the city was stimulated by the arrival of canals in the late 18th century and railways in the early 19th century. The Ashton Canal and the Rochdale Canal pass through the area and form a junction within it. Listed structures associated with the canals include a flight of locks, an aqueduct, boundary walls, and bridges. Listed buildings associated with the railways include two stations, a viaduct, a warehouse, and goods offices. The area contained textile mills, some of which have survived and are listed, most of them in Chorlton-on-Medlock. On the edge of the commercial area is Piccadilly Gardens, an open space that contains a number of listed statues. Other listed buildings include houses, hotels and public houses, factories, civic buildings, offices, educational buildings, a former power station, and places of entertainment including former cinemas and a dance hall.

== Key ==
Grade	Criteria
II*	Particularly important buildings of more than special interest
II	Buildings of national importance and special interest

== Buildings ==
Name and location	Photograph	Date	Notes	Grade
4, 6 and 8 Bradley Street with screen walls 53.48369°N 2.23270°W		Late 18th century	A row of six cottages in three blocks linked by screen walls, with one cottage in each block facing the street and the other facing the rear yard. They are in brick with slate roofs, and were rebuilt in 1996. Each block has a plain doorway, a segmental-headed window on the ground floor, and a flat-headed window above.	II
24, 26 and 28 Dale Street; 53.48157°N 2.23403°W		Late 18th century	Three houses, later partly used for other purposes, in brick, partly stuccoed, with a dentilled eaves cornice, a slate roof, and an L-shaped plan. There are three storeys with cellars, and six bays, with a chamfered corner on the right. No. 24 has a round-headed doorway with engaged columns and an open pediment, and the doorways to Nos. 26 and 28 have flat heads, moulded architraves, and triangular pediments. Most of the windows are sashes, and on the middle floor they have segmental heads. (Note: Street View in September 2016 shows that the building is no longer occupied by Nicklebys public house.)	II
45, 47 and 47A Hilton Street; 53.48170°N 2.23199°W		Late 18th century	A pair of brick houses, later a café, with some sandstone dressings and a slate roof. There are two storeys with basements, a double-depth plan, and each house has two bays. The doorways on the right are approached up steps with railings, and have moulded architraves and pediments. The windows are sashes with segmental heads.	II
47 Piccadilly; 53.48114°N 2.23536°W		Late 18th century (probable)	A house, later a shop, in stuccoed brick with a dentilled eaves cornice and a slate roof. It has three low storeys and three narrow bays. The windows are sashes, some with cornices.	II
74–80 Portland Street and railings 53.47794°N 2.23973°W		Late 18th century (probable)	A row of four houses, later used for other purposes, including one as a public house. They are in brick, with No. 78 rendered, and they have a slate roof. There are three low storeys, and No. 80 has a cellar with railings in front of the cellar area. The windows vary.	II
87–91 Princess Street; 53.47799°N 2.24072°W		Late 18th century (probable)	A row of three Georgian houses in red brick with some sandstone dressings and a slate roof. They have three storeys, No. 89 has three bays and the other houses have two each. All have round-headed doorways; No. 87 has a Tuscan doorcase with pilasters and an open pediment; and Nos. 89 and 91 have recessed doorcase with fluted pilasters. The ground floor windows have been altered, and on the floors above are sash windows.	II
Store Street Aqueduct; 53.47958°N 2.22735°W		c. 1794–1799	The aqueduct, designed by Benjamin Outram, carries the Ashton Canal over Shore Street. It is in sandstone, about 70 metres (230 ft) long, and crosses the street at angle of about 45 degrees. It consists of a single skewed semi-elliptical arch, with voussoirs, triangular buttresses, bands, and coped parapets.	II*
9 Richmond Street; 53.47781°N 2.23607°W		c. 1800	A Georgian house in brick with a modillioned eaves cornice and a slate roof. There are three storeys, a single-depth plan, and two wide bays. The central doorway has a round head, semi-columns, an entablature, and an open pediment, and is flanked by inserted openings. The windows on the middle floor have segmental heads, there is one sash window, and the others are casements.	II
13 and 15 Paton Street and railings 53.48025°N 2.23298°W		c. 1800	A pair of houses, later used for other purposes, in brown brick with a slate roof. They have three storeys with basements, a double-depth plan, and two bays each. The windows are sashes; in No. 13 with segmental heads, and in No. 15 with wedge lintels. In front of the basement of No. 13 are area railings and steps down.	II
39 Chorlton Street; 53.47770°N 2.23597°W		c. 1800	A Georgian house, later a shop, in brick with wooden modillioned eaves and a slate roof. There are three storeys, a double-depth plan, and two bays. The doorway has a round head, semi-columns, an entablature, and an open pediment, and the windows are sashes, with those on the middle floor having segmental heads.	II
Lock No. 83, Rochdale Canal; 53.48165°N 2.22935°W		c. 1800	The lock is in sandstone with a chamber 14 feet (4.3 m) wide. There are pairs of wooden gates at both ends, and a ladder in centre of the north side.	II
50–62 Port Street; 53.48188°N 2.23188°W		Late 18th or early 19th century	A row of seven shops with domestic accommodation above, in brown brick with slate roofs. They have three low storeys, a double-depth plan, and one bay each, with No. 50 taller and forming a cross-wing at the right end. On the ground floor are pilastered 19th-century shop fronts. The windows are sashes and No. 54 has a six-light horizontally-sliding sash window. The return of No. 50 has three bays and a basement with railings round the area.	II
69–77 Lever Street and 10 Bradley Street; 53.48368°N 2.23248°W		Late 18th or early 19th century	A terrace of five brick houses with a slate roof, they have three storeys and basements, a double-depth plan with rear extensions, and two or three bays each. The round-headed doorways have Tuscan doorcases, fanlights, and open pediments. The windows are sashes, with segmental heads on the lower two floors, and flat heads on the top floor. At the rear No. 10 Bradley Street has three storeys, five bays, and a mix of cross windows and casements.	II
Circus Tavern and railings 53.47782°N 2.24000°W		Late 18th or early 19th century	A house, extended later and used as a public house, it is in brick with a stuccoed front and a Welsh slate roof. It has three storeys and a cellar, a double-depth plan, and one bay with a single-room width. There are sash windows on the lower two floors and a three-light casement window on the top floor. In front of the access to the cellar are 20th-century railings.	II
Boundary wall, Rochdale Canal; 53.47650°N 2.23764°W		1804	The wall runs along Canal Street between the street and the canal from Sackville Street to Princess Street. It consists of upright slabs of millstone grit with rounded tops.	II
Boundary wall, Rochdale Canal; 53.47801°N 2.23525°W		1804	The wall runs along Canal Street between the street and the canal from Minshull Street to Chorlton Street. It consists of upright slabs of millstone grit with rounded tops.	II
Boundary wall, Rochdale Canal; 53.47722°N 2.23649°W		1804	The wall runs along Canal Street between the street and the canal from Chorlton Street to Sackville Street. It consists of upright slabs of millstone grit with rounded tops.	II
Footbridge and ramps, Rochdale Canal; 53.48193°N 2.22906°W		c. 1804 (probable)	The footbridge crosses the canal adjacent to Lock No. 83. It is approached by brick ramps on each side that have cobbled surfaces and walls of stone slabs with rounded tops.	II
Lock No. 84, Rochdale Canal; 53.47972°N 2.23157°W		1804–05	The lock is in sandstone with a chamber 14 feet (4.3 m) wide. There are pairs of wooden gates at both ends, and a ladder in centre of the north side.	II
Lock No. 85, Rochdale Canal; 53.47936°N 2.23235°W		1804–05	The lock, which is underground, is in sandstone with a chamber 14 feet (4.3 m) wide. There are pairs of wooden gates at both ends, and a ladder in centre of the south side.	II
Lock No. 86, Rochdale Canal; 53.47774°N 2.23554°W		1804–05	The lock is in sandstone with a chamber 14 feet (4.3 m) wide. There are pairs of wooden gates at both ends, and a ladder in centre of the south side.	II
Lock No. 87 and footbridge, Rochdale Canal; 53.47629°N 2.23805°W		1804–05	The lock is in sandstone with a chamber 14 feet (4.3 m) wide. There are pairs of wooden gates at both ends, and a ladder in centre of the south side. At the lower end is a cast iron footbridge.	II
Lock No. 88, Rochdale Canal; 53.47537°N 2.24107°W		1804–05	The lock is in sandstone with a chamber 14 feet (4.3 m) wide. There are pairs of wooden gates at both ends, and a ladder in centre of the north side.	II
Lock No. 89, Rochdale Canal; 53.47438°N 2.24593°W		1804–05	The lock is in sandstone with a chamber 14 feet (4.3 m) wide. There are pairs of wooden gates at both ends, and a ladder in centre of the north side.	II
Lock No. 90, Rochdale Canal; 53.47448°N 2.24873°W		1804–05	The lock is in sandstone with a chamber 14 feet (4.3 m) wide. There are pairs of wooden gates at both ends, and a ladder in centre of the north side.	II
Dale Warehouse; 53.48029°N 2.23190°W		1806	A canal warehouse incorporating a waterwheel, designed by William Crossley, later converted for other uses. It is built in millstone grit with quoins, bands, a moulded cornice, a parapet, and a slate roof. There are four storeys with a basement, and five bays, and internally there are cast iron columns and timber floors. The windows have plain surrounds, there is a Venetian window in the north gable, and other openings include a round-headed doorway, a segmental-headed loading doorway, and at the rear are two semicircular shipping holes and a round-headed doorway to the left.	II*
Mill on north-east corner of junction with Chester Street; 53.47175°N 2.24275°W		1813	A cotton spinning mill later used as offices, it is in brown brick with some sandstone dressings and has a coped parapet. There are five storeys, a basement and an attic, with 13 bays on Cambridge Street, and five on the gabled end on Chester Street. Near the centre is a square stair turret with a door at the base. The windows have segmental brick arched heads.	II
Chorlton New Mills; 53.47261°N 2.24345°W		1813–1815	The mill was built in three phases, the first along Cambridge Street; the second in 1818 at right angles on Hulme Street, and a linking block on the corner in 1845. The chimney was added in 1853. The blocks have a cast iron frame, red brick walls and slate roofs. The original block has eight storeys and 20 bays and an internal engine house. The block on Hulme Street has six storeys and twelve bays, and the linking block has six storeys, six bays on Hulme Street and four bays with two gables on Cambridge Street. The chimney is octagonal and has iron bands.	II
Chatham Mill; 53.47206°N 2.24148°W		1820	The cotton spinning mill was extended in 1823 and has since been used for other purposes. It is in brick with a slate roof, and has an L-shaped plan. The original part has six storeys and 17 bays, an internal engine house and the remains of a chimney. The entrance in the northeast corner has a rusticated surround, the windows have cambered brick heads, and at the rear are loading bays. The extension has four storeys and twelve bays.	II
Peveril of the Peak public house 53.47502°N 2.24462°W		c. 1820	The public house was remodelled in about 1900. It is in brick faced with coloured faience tiles, and has a hipped Welsh slate roof. The pub has a V-shaped plan on a corner site, with two low storeys. The plinth is dark green, the ground floor is yellow-green and the upper floor is yellow. The doorways have multicoloured pilasters, and between the floors are lettered tiles.	II
Entrance archway and lodge, Rochdale Canal Company; 53.47995°N 2.23199°W		1822	The structure is in sandstone and consists of a screen wall about 10 metres (33 ft) long and 8 metres (26 ft) tall, with a small lodge at the rear. In the centre is a large round-headed arch, with a sash window to the left having a keyed lintel. Along the top is a full-length lettered panel with a moulded surround, a plain frieze, a moulded cornice, and an embattled parapet. The lodge has a chamfered doorway, a sash window, and an embattled parapet with circle upstands.	II
Marlsbro House; 53.48215°N 2.23232°W		1823	A factory, later used for other purposes, it is in red brick with cement rendering, some iron framing, and with slated roofs. There are four storeys, a basement and a loft, the front facing Newton Street has 16 bays, the middle four bays slightly projecting, and the front facing Hilton street has five storeys and four bays. The render is coloured in squares of light and dark grey, and the ground floor is painted grey. The rectangular windows have modern metal frames. The roof structure uses both iron and timber elements, and includes a cast iron clerestory, internally the floors are of heavy-timber construction, and iron ring beams are incorporated in the walls.	II
The Brunswick Hotel; 53.47995°N 2.23330°W		Early 19th century	Originally a hotel and two houses at the rear, later a public house, it is in stuccoed brick on a plinth, with a sill band and a slate roof. There are three storeys with cellars, and a symmetrical front of four bays. The central doorway has a Tuscan doorcase with pilasters, a blocked fanlight, and an open pediment. The windows have moulded architraves, those on the ground floor with multi-panes, and those above are sashes. There are similar windows and doorway along Paton Street.	II
8 Lever Street; 53.48152°N 2.23505°W		Early 19th century	A brick house with a slate roof, three storeys and a cellar, and a symmetrical front of five bays. There is a central round-headed doorway that has a Tuscan architrave with engaged columns, a cornice and a blocking course. The ground floor windows have been altered, and above are windows with segmental heads and altered glazing.	II
10 Lever Street; 53.48156°N 2.23498°W		Early 19th century	A brick house with a slate roof, three storeys and a cellar, and three bays. The doorway on the right has a cornice on consoles, the ground floor windows have been altered, and above are sash windows with segmental heads.	II
12 and 14 Lever Street; 53.48162°N 2.23486°W		Early 19th century	A pair of stuccoed brick houses with a slate roof, three storeys with cellars, a double-depth plan, and three bays each. The round-headed doorways are in the outer bays, and have engaged columns with acanthus-leaf capitals, fluted entablatures with paterae, and dentilled cornices. The ground floor windows have been altered, and above are sash windows.	II
94–98 Grosvenor Street; 53.47108°N 2.23480°W		Early 19th century	A row of three houses, later altered, in red brick on a stone plinth, with some sandstone dressings, a modillioned cornice, and a slate roof. They have a double-depth plan, three storeys with cellars, and each house has three bays. No. 98 has a round-headed doorway with Tuscan semi-columns and a fanlight. To the right are modern shop fronts, and on the upper floors are sash windows.	II
The Briton's Protection public house 53.47499°N 2.24730°W		Early 19th century	The public house was internally remodelled in about 1930. It is in red brick, roughcast at the front above the ground floor, with corner pilasters, a parapet raised in the centre, and a slate roof. It has a double-depth plan, three storeys and cellars, and a symmetrical front. On the ground floor are three doorway with pilastered jambs and foliate capitals, and windows with altered glazing, above which is a fascia board and a cornice. On the upper floors are sash windows with moulded architraves.	II
The Churchill public house 53.47775°N 2.23607°W		Early 19th century	The public house is in stuccoed brick with a sill band and a slate roof. There are two storeys and a symmetrical front of three bays. The central doorway has a square fanlight and a cornice on elongated consoles, and is flanked by tall windows. On the upper floor are small casement windows.	II
New Union public house 53.47631°N 2.23847°W		Early 19th century	The public house is in red brick on a plinth with the ground floor rendered, and has a sill band and a slate roof. There are two storeys, a symmetrical front of three bays, and a rear extension. On the front is a doorway with a segmental head, and the windows are altered casements.	II
Rochdale Canal Company office 53.48006°N 2.23205°W		Early 19th century	The office of the Rochdale Canal is in rendered and roughcast brick with a slate roof. There are two storeys, a double-depth plan, and three bays. The central doorway has pilaster jambs, a lettered cornice on double consoles, and a fanlight, and the windows are sashes. At the rear is a round-headed doorway with a fanlight and a stair window.	II
Brownsfield Mill; 53.48218°N 2.22896°W		c. 1825	A cotton spinning mill, later used for other purposes, it is in brick, mainly rendered, with slate roofs and an internal structure of cast iron and timber. It has an L-shaped plan, the earlier block parallel is to the Rochdale Canal and has seven storeys and twelve bays, an internal engine house, a small privy tower at the north, taking-in doors, and small windows with segmental heads. The later block, at right angles, has six storeys and seven bays, a central full-height loading bay, and a privy and stair turret.	II*
19 Paton Street; 53.48034°N 2.23276°W		Early to mid-19th century	A brick house, later used for other purposes, with a slate roof, three storeys, a double-depth plan, and three bays. The windows are sashes; they and the doorway to the right have segmental heads.	II
Former Junction Works; 53.48019°N 2.22873°W		Early to mid-19th century (probable)	A former lead works with an internal structure of cast iron columns and timber floors, and walls in brick with a parapet. It has a trapeziform plan, four storeys, eleven bays facing the wharf, loading doors and windows with segmental heads. At the west end are three gables.	II
Minshull House, Chorlton Street; 53.47739°N 2.23539°W		Early to mid-19th century	A warehouse in red brick with sandstone dressings and an internal iron frame. There are three storeys and a basement, and an L-shaped plan with five bays on the front and 13 along the side. The central three bays project slightly and are flanked by rusticated quoins. On the ground floor is a large elliptical-arched wagon entrance with rusticated quoins and a raised keystone, and in each of the outer bays is a tall round-headed window. The windows on the upper floors have segmental heads. At the rear is a full-width cantilevered jetty from the first floor upwards.	II
Stable block, Junction Works; 53.48004°N 2.22813°W		Early to mid-19th century	The former stable block is in red brick with a slate roof and has a rectangular plan. There are two storeys and nine bays. The five doorways have segmental heads, as do some of the windows, and others have square heads, and there is a loft doorway.	II
Former Rochdale Canal Warehouse; 53.48155°N 2.23047°W		1836	The warehouse has been converted into flats. It is in brown brick with some sandstone dressings, and has a long rectangular plan, with six storeys and fronts of 13 and four bays. The openings include small round-headed windows, semicircular shipping holes with keystones, and horizontal-rectangular windows. At the ends are full-height round-headed multi-stage loading slots.	II*
The Athenaeum; 53.47845°N 2.24141°W		1836–37	Originally a cultural club designed by Charles Barry is the style of an Italian palazzo, it was damaged by fire in 1873, following which it was remodelled and an attic added. It subsequently became part of the Manchester Art Gallery. The building is in sandstone and has a slate mansard roof with wrought iron cresting. There is a rectangular plan with two storeys and a basement, and a symmetrical front of nine bays. The building has rusticated quoins, sill bands, an inscribed frieze, a mutuled cornice, and a balustraded parapet. Steps lead up to a porch with Roman Doric columns, a triglyph frieze, a moulded cornice and a balustraded parapet. The windows are casements with moulded architraves, on the lower floor they have cornices and aprons, and on the upper floor with balustrades and pediments.	II*
32 and 34 Laystall Street; 53.48106°N 2.22790°W		1838	A warehouse in red brick with much decoration in buff and white terracotta, it has a rectangular plan, three storeys and a symmetrical front of five bays. In the centre is a segmental wagon entrance with a decorated surround, above it is an oriel window, and over that is a three-light arcaded window. Flanking the centre bay are round-headed doorways, with round-headed windows above, and square-headed windows on the top floor. The other windows are paired. All the windows have decorated surrounds, including twisted shafts with foliated caps.	II
Former Mackintosh Works; 53.47230°N 2.24441°W		1838	Formerly a works for producing rubberised fabric, it is in red brick with some sandstone dressings and a slate roof. The works has an L-shaped plan, six storeys, a main block of about 17 bays, and a wing of five bays. The windows are small with segmental heads, and on part of the building is a parapet.	II
35, 37 and 39A George Street; 53.47847°N 2.24082°W		1840s	A warehouse later used for other purposes, it has a front of sandstone and red brick at the rear. There are three storeys and a basement, and nine bays. The basement and ground floor are rusticated, and have a modillioned cornice and a parapet. Along the ground floor are windows and doorways with square heads, narrow rusticated piers, and a continuous lintel. The upper floors contain sash windows, on the middle floor they have segmental heads, keystones and small iron balconies, and on the top floor they have round heads, linked imposts, and moulded heads with keystones.	II
45 and 47 Faulkner Street; 53.47859°N 2.23929°W		1840s	A warehouse used later for other purposes, it is in sandstone and red brick with sandstone dressings. The building is in Georgian style with four storeys and a basement, and has a symmetrical front of six bays. The basement and ground floor are rusticated and have a modillioned cornice. The outer bays contain round-headed doorways with rusticated surrounds and pediments. Most of the windows are sashes with architraves, those on the first floor also having dentilled cornices.	II
41 and 43 Faulkner Street; 53.47869°N 2.23917°W		1842	A warehouse in brick with a sandstone front and a slate roof. It is in Classical style, with four storeys and a basement, and a symmetrical front of five bays. On the ground floor is a square-headed doorway with a pilastered architrave and a blind balustrade, and segmental-headed windows. On the first and second floors is a colonnade of fluted Ionic columns with entablatures, a frieze and a cornice, and at the top is a pediment. The windows on the upper floors have square heads, and all are sashes.	II
39 and 41 George Street; 53.47834°N 2.24101°W		c. 1845	A warehouse by Edward Walters, later used for other purposes, it is in sandstone at the front and brick at the rear. The ground floor is rusticated and punch dressed, with a plain frieze and a modillioned cornice. The upper floors have quoins, above the second floor is a modillioned cornice, and at the top is a string course and a parapet. The building has a U-shaped plan with two rear wings, four storeys and a basement, and a front of nine bays. The ground floor has an arcade of segmental arches above the doorways and windows; the doorways have architraves with pilasters and cornices. On the upper floors are sash windows with segmental heads, quoins and keystones.	II
49 Piccadilly; 53.48113°N 2.23513°W		1846–47	A warehouse, later a shop, in red brick with sandstone dressings and a slate roof, and in the style of a palazzo. There are five storeys and an attic, and a symmetrical front of seven bays, with rusticated quoins, a plain frieze, a modillioned cornice, and a brick parapet with stone pilasters. On the ground floor is a modern shop front and to the right is a square-headed doorway with a decorated surround. The windows have moulded architraves, some with aprons and pediments, and some with cornices. Along the top is a full-length dormer window.	II
Manchester South Junction and Altrincham Railway Viaduct; 53.47393°N 2.24736°W		1846–1849	The viaduct was built by the Manchester, South Junction and Altrincham Railway to carry its line over roads and the river Medlock, running from Piccadilly station though Oxford Road and Deansgate stations, then dividing into two branches at Castlefield. It is built in red brick with some blue brick, sandstone dressings, and cast iron bridges. It runs for about 1.75 miles (2.82 km) and consists of 224 arches about 30 feet (9.1 m) tall and 28 feet (8.5 m) wide and a number of bridges that are decorated in Gothic or Classical details.	II
83 Princess Street; 53.47822°N 2.24098°W		c. 1847	A former warehouse with a sandstone ground floor and in red brick with sandstone dressings above. It is on a corner site, and has four storeys and a basement, a front of nine bays, and three bays on the left return. The building has a ground floor cornice, quoins, pilasters, sill bands and a top moulded cornice. On the ground floor is an arcade of round arches with a moulded impost band, voussoirs, and volute keystones, and above are round-headed windows with keystones.	II
68 Dale Street; 53.48039°N 2.23267°W		Mid-19th century (probable)	A warehouse in red brick on a sandstone plinth, with a sill band and a parapet. It is on a corner site, and has three storeys and a basement, and a front of five bays. On the front is a square-headed doorway with a rusticated surround and a keystone, and the windows have gauged brick heads. In the left return is a segmental-headed doorway.	II
49 Faulkner Street; 53.47851°N 2.23943°W		c. 1850	A warehouse used later for other purposes, it is in red brick with sandstone dressings, rusticated quoins, an impost band, sill bands, and a cornice on tall brackets. The building is in Georgian style, and has four storeys with a basement, and four bays. On the ground floor is a round-headed doorway with pilaster jambs, a fluted lintel, moulded imposts, a semicircular fanlight and a moulded head with a keystone. The windows have architraves, on the first and second floors with modillioned lintels, and on the top floor with segmental heads.	II
59 and 61 Faulkner Street; 53.47810°N 2.24010°W		c. 1850	Originally a milliner's workshop and shop, later altered, it is in red brick with sandstone dressings, a cornice above the ground floor, a modillioned cornice above the second floor, and a high parapet with corner pilasters. There are three storeys with a cellar and an attic, and four bays. On the ground floor the main door has an architrave with pilasters and debased Ionic capitals, a panelled frieze, and a cornice on consoles. Flanking it are windows with similar surrounds, to the left is a doorway, probably inserted, and to the right is a cellar door. The windows above have gauged brick heads, some are sashes, and at the top is a row of five two-light workshop windows.	II
Bradley House; 53.48160°N 2.23303°W		c. 1850	A warehouse later used for other purposes, it is in sandstone and brick, with a wedge-shaped plan, and it is in late Georgian style. There are five storeys and a basement, with one bay on Dale Street, and sides of 14 and 15 bays. The ground floor has channelled piers and a cornice band, with a similar band between the second and third floors. At the top is a parapet with simple coping. The windows are sashes.	II
Crusader Works; 53.47877°N 2.22547°W		Mid-19th century	A mill later used for other purposes, it is in red brick with some sandstone dressings, and has a long rectangular plan. There are six storeys and 28 bays, and a three-storey four-bay extension at the west. It has panelled corner pilasters, cornices, and a parapet with coping. The windows are long rectangular, mainly sashes, and there are round-headed doorways.	II
Lass O'Gowrie public house 53.47413°N 2.23788°W		Mid-19th century	The public house, which was altered in about 1900, is in red brick with cladding on the ground floor of glazed terracotta in various colours, a prominent modillioned cornice, and a hipped slate roof. There are two storeys with a basement, the west corner is chamfered, and there are six bays on the front and two on the return. On the ground floor are pilaster panels that have debased Ionic capitals with pendants and ball-flower decoration, and a doorway in neo-Baroque style with an open segmental pediment and a lettered frieze. The windows are sashes with segmental heads.	II
44–50 Portland Street; 53.47845°N 2.23897°W		c. 1850–1860 (probable)	Warehouses, later used for other purposes, in red brick on a vermiculated plinth, with sandstone dressings, a pilastered ground floor with a cornice, sill bands, a top moulded cornice, and a slate roof. There are five storeys and a basement, and a symmetrical front of six bays. The round-headed doorways have shafts, decorative lintels, moulded heads with keystones, and cornices on consoles. The windows are sashes, some with segmental heads and others with square heads.	II
Former goods offices, Piccadilly station 53.47715°N 2.23154°W		c. 1850–1860	The offices are in sandstone, in Renaissance style, and have two storeys. On the ground floor is a doorway with a pediment, above the ground floor is a lettered frieze, and on the upper floor are round-headed windows with elaborate architraves.	II
Mill chimney stack 53.47219°N 2.24394°W		c. 1851	A detached chimney stack built to serve Chorlton New Mill, it is in brown brick. The chimney stack is octagonal, tapering, and surmounted by a stone cornice. Near the top are three metal straps.	II
Portland Hotel; 53.48026°N 2.23531°W		1851–52	Three warehouses designed by Edward Walters in the style of an Italian palazzo, later used as a hotel and offices. They are in sandstone, and only the façades remain. The warehouse on the left has four storeys and six bays, the middle warehouse has five storeys with an attic and seven bays, and the one on the right has four storeys and seven bays. All the parts have round-headed openings on the ground floor, rusticated quoins, and dentilled or modillioned cornices.	II
Peel statue 53.48140°N 2.23749°W		1853	The statue, which commemorates the politician Robert Peel, is in Piccadilly Gardens. It is by William Calder Marshall, and consists of a rectangular ashlar pedestal on three steps. On the top step are two bronze statues of female figures, and on the pedestal is a bronze statue of Peel standing.	II
Dalton statue 53.47192°N 2.24045°W		1854	The statue by William Theed commemorates the scientist John Dalton, and is in the forecourt of Dalton College. The statue is on bronze on a stone plinth and portrays Dalton sitting and wearing an academic gown. It was originally in Piccadilly Gardens and was moved here in 1966.	II
103 Princess Street; 53.47691°N 2.23924°W		1854–55	Originally the Mechanics' Institute, and later used for other purposes, it is in red brick on a stone plinth, with sandstone dressings, bands, a plain frieze, a modillioned cornice, and a pilastered parapet. It is in the style of an Italian palazzo, with an irregular plan on an island site, three storeys, a basement and an attic, and a symmetrical front of seven bays. There is a central round-headed doorway with a moulded surround and a cornice on consoles. The windows are sashes with architraves, those on the middle floor with segmental pediments.	II*
Lindencort House; 53.47874°N 2.23900°W		c. 1855	A warehouse by Edward Walters, later used for other purposes, it is in red brick with sandstone dressings on a channelled plinth, with quoins, sill bands, and a moulded cornice. There are five storeys and a basement, and six bays, with three bays on the right return. On the ground floor is a round-headed doorway with a moulded surround, spandrels with swags, and a cornice, and the windows are round-headed with keystones. all the windows are sashes, those on the upper floors having segmental heads with keystones.	II
Britannia Hotel; 53.47901°N 2.23730°W		1855–1858	Originally a drapery warehouse in the style of a palazzo, later converted into a hotel, it is in sandstone with a granite plinth, a rusticated ground floor, fluted pilasters, and cornices. There is a rectangular plan, five storeys with basements, roof pavilions, and a symmetrical front of 23 bays. The windows are of a different type on each of the floors. The pavilions are large and rectangular with one at each end and two flanking the centre. They each contain five wheel windows and have balustraded parapets.	II*
Fraser House; 53.47860°N 2.23871°W		c. 1855–1860	A warehouse designed by Edward Walters in Italianate style, and later used for other purposes, it is in red brick on a rusticated plinth, with sandstone dressings, a frieze and cornice on the ground floor, dentilled sill bands above, and a bracketed cornice and parapet at the top. There are four storeys with a basement, with three bays on Charlotte Street and five on Portland Street. On the ground floor is a round-headed doorway with a moulded surround, an architrave and a modillioned cornice. The windows on the upper floors have arched heads.	II
Wellington statue 53.48090°N 2.23568°W		1856	The statue commemorating the Duke of Wellington stands near Piccadilly Gardens and was designed by Matthew Noble. It has a base of three steps, and a plinth and a pedestal in ashlar stone. On the pedestal is a bronze statue depicting the duke standing, and the pedestal is flanked by four bronze statues depicting allegories. On the sides of the pedestal are inscriptions, and on the sides of the plinth are relief panels.	II
Austin House; 53.47911°N 2.23974°W		1856–1858	A warehouse by Edward Walters in the style of an Italian palazzo, and later used for other purposes. It is in sandstone and light red brick, with sandstone dressings, channelled corner pilasters, decorative sill bands, and a prominent cornice on brackets. There are five storeys with a basement, and a symmetrical front of eight bays. The ground floor has an arcade of round-headed arches above doorways and windows. In the centre the paired doorways with foliated spandrels, keystones, and a triglyph frieze. The first floor windows have architraves and cornices, the second floor windows have architraves and pediments, on the third floor they have segmental heads and linked impost bands, and on the top floor they have decorative aprons.	II
Watt statue 53.48128°N 2.23672°W		1857	The statue, which commemorates the inventor and engineer James Watt, is in Piccadilly Gardens. It is by William Theed, and consists of a rectangular ashlar pedestal with bowed ends, a moulded base and a cornice. On the pedestal is a bronze statue of Watt seated on a chair.	II
61 Oxford Street; 53.47594°N 2.24213°W		1860	A shop in red brick and stone with five storeys. On the ground floor is a modern shop front. The ground and first floors have banded pilasters and a moulded cornice. On the first floor is continuous glazing with slender shafts, on the second floor is an arcade of segmental-headed windows, on the third floor is an arcade of round-headed windows, all under a stone band with keystones. The top floor contains square windows.	II
127–133 Portland Street; 53.47628°N 2.24184°W		1860	Warehouses later used for other purposes, in red brick with some sandstone on a stone plinth, with sandstone dressings, rusticated piers on the ground floor, a moulded cornice above, rusticated quoins on the corners, a moulded sill band, and a brick parapet with stone coping. The building has an irregular plan on a corner site and has four storeys with a basement, and a front of 23 bays. On the ground floor are loading bays with segmental heads, voussoirs, and voluted keystones, and a round-headed doorway. On the corner is a doorway with a moulded surround. On the upper floors the windows form a round-headed arcade, and on the top floor are square-headed sash windows.	II
46, 48 and 50 Faulkner Street; 53.47821°N 2.24023°W		c. 1860 (probable)	A row of three warehouses, later used for other purposes, in red brick on a rusticated plinth, with sill bands, a moulded cornice, and a slate roof. It has a deep rectangular plan, with three storeys and a basement, and three bays. On the ground floor are round arches with moulded heads and keystones above doorways and windows. On the upper floors are triple moulded segmental-arched sash windows with architraves and keystones, and at the rear are full-height loading slots under a parapet.	II
51 and 53 Richmond Street; 53.47677°N 2.23773°W		c. 1860 (probable)	A small warehouse in brown brick, the sides rendered, with sill bands and a slate roof. There are three storeys with a basement, and six bays. Most of the windows have segmental heads. On the ground floor is a doorway and a loading bay with a wall crane.	II
63 George Street; 53.47741°N 2.24227°W		c. 1860	A warehouse later used for other purposes, in sandstone and red brick, with sandstone dressings, string courses, rusticated quoins, a bracketed cornice, and a balustraded parapet. It is in the style of an Italian palazzo, and has four storeys, a basement, four bays on George Street, and five on Dickinson Street. The ground floor is rusticated and has an arcade of round-headed arches with impost bands and voluted keystones. The round-headed doorway has a decorative architrave that has a keystone with a herm flanked by swags, and a moulded cornice. The windows have decorative surrounds.	II
8–12 Newton Street; 53.48105°N 2.23374°W		c. 1860–1870	Originally warehouses, workshops and offices, the building is in brown brick with sandstone dressings. There are four storeys and a basement, and four bays divided by brick pilasters. The building has sill bands, a cornice and a parapet. On the ground floor are modern shop fronts, and paired arched doorways with colonnettes and carved capitals. The windows are sashes, those on the second floor with polychromic arched heads. In the right return is a two-storey canted bay window.	II
13–17 Albion Street; 53.47469°N 2.24764°W		c. 1860–1870	A warehouse later used as offices, in red brick with sandstone dressings, pilasters, sill bands, a brick corbelled frieze, and a hipped slate roof. It is in Venetian Gothic style with a U-shaped plan, four storeys and a basement, and a front of nine bays, five bays in the left return, and a canted corner. In the corner is a segmental-headed doorway. On the ground floor are showroom windows on the front, and an arcade of windows in the return. The windows on the upper floors have cast iron tracery.	II
25 and 27 Dale Street and 22 Lever Street; 53.48201°N 2.23431°W		c. 1860–1870	A warehouse in red brick with a sandstone plinth and dressings in late Georgian style. It is in red brick with a sandstone plinth and dressings, and a rectangular plan on a corner site. It has four storeys, a basement and an attic, with 14 bays on Dale Street and ten on Lever Street. The building has pilastered corners, sill bands, Lombard friezes, and a cornice. On Dale Street is a two-storey round archway with a rusticated surround, a keystone, and a cornice on fluted brackets.	II
46 Sackville Street; 53.47646°N 2.23652°W		c. 1860–1870	A former warehouse in red brick on a plinth, with sandstone dressings, a Lombard frieze, pilasters, sill bands, a wooden eaves cornice on moulded brackets, and a slate roof. It is on a corner site, and has four storeys and a basement, and a front of five bays with a chamfered corner on the right. In the corner bay is a segmental-headed doorway with a moulded surround, above which is an oriel window that has a rounded window with pilaster jambs, a keystone, and a hipped roof. The windows have various heads; round, segmental and square.	II
52 and 54 Portland Street; 53.47836°N 2.23910°W		c. 1860–1870	Warehouses later used for other purposes, in red brick with sandstone dressings, sill bands, a moulded cornice, and a slate roof. There are five storeys with a basement, and three wide bays. The ground floor is pilastered, and contains various doorways and windows. The upper floors contain three-light sash windows; on the first floor they have pilastered architraves, the central window with a segmental pediment; and on the second floor they have panelled aprons and arched cornices.	II
109 and 111 Portland Street; 53.47701°N 2.24064°W		c. 1860–1870	A pair of warehouses, later used for other purposes, in red brick with sandstone dressings and slate mansard roofs. No. 109 has five storeys and three bays, No. 111 has four storeys and two bays, and both have basements, banded pilasters, a ground floor bracketed cornice, sill bands, a bracketed eaves cornice, and dormers with architraves and pediments. The doorways have segmental heads with panelled pilasters, cornices on consoles, and internal steps. The windows are sashes, square-headed on the ground floor, round-headed on the first floor, and segmental-headed above.	II
113–119 Portland Street; 53.47677°N 2.24108°W		c. 1860–1870	A warehouse later used for other purposes, in red brick on a stone plinth, with sandstone dressings, Lombard friezes, and a moulded cornice. It is on a corner site, with four storeys and a basement, 16 bays on Portland Street, and ten on Dickinson Street. The windows are sashes, the ground and first floor windows have square heads, and on the upper floors they have segmental heads. On Dickinson Street is a square-headed loading bay.	II
32 Dickinson Street and 106 and 108 Portland Street; 53.47686°N 2.24167°W		c. 1860–1880	A commercial building with a sandstone ground floor on a plinth, and red brick with sandstone dressings above. It is on a corner site, it has the plan of an irregular parallelogram with a chamfered corner, and has four storeys with a cellar, five bays on each front and a bay on the corner. On the ground floor are rusticated piers, and on the upper floors are brick pilasters, bands, and cornices. In the corner bay is a square-headed doorway, and above it is a two-light window with a balcony. All the windows are sashes; on the upper floors they are paired, on the first floor with segmental heads, on the second floor with shaped heads, and on the top floor with round heads.	II
42 and 44 Sackville Street; 53.47668°N 2.23683°W		c. 1860–1880	The former warehouse is in red brick on a channelled plinth, with sandstone dressings, a pilastered ground floor, a frieze and cornice, a top cornice, a parapet, and a hipped slate roof. There are four storeys with a basement, a symmetrical front of ten bays, with eight bays on the sides. In the centre are paired round-headed doorways that have polished pink granite shafts with Composite capitals, keystones, and a bracketed and dentilled cornice. Most of the windows are sashes.	II
72–76 Newton Street; 53.48295°N 2.23107°W		c. 1860–1880	Warehouses, later used for other purposes, the building is in red brick with sandstone dressings and a hipped slate roof, and is in the style of a simple palazzo. It has a long rectangular plan, four storeys with a basement, a front of 13 bays and seven bays in the sides. There are three round-headed doorways with pilasters, keystones, panelled spandrels, and cornices on consoles. The windows are sashes with round heads on the top floor and segmental heads elsewhere.	II
116 and 118 Portland Street; 53.47655°N 2.24202°W		c. 1860–1880	A warehouse later used for other purposes, it is in red brick on a plinth, with sandstone dressings, a ground floor cornice, a sill band, and a prominent modillioned cornice. It is in Italian Renaissance style, and has three storeys with a basement and attic, and a symmetrical front of six bays. The ground floor is arcaded with round-headed arches above the windows and the doorways in the outer bays. The doorways have keystones and segmental pediments on brackets. The windows on the middle floor have segmental heads and architraves with cornices, on the top floor they are round-headed between brick pilasters, and in the attic are two dormers with open pediments.	II
Dale Street Chambers; 53.48256°N 2.23545°W		1860s (probable)	A block of shops and offices, stuccoed with sandstone dressings and a slate roof. There are four storeys with an attic, five bays on Oldham Street, a canted bay on the corner, and seven bays on Dale Street. On the ground floor are modern shop fronts. The windows on the first floor are round-headed with foliated imposts and spandrels with fleur-de-lys decoration, on the second floor they have segmental heads, and on the top floor the windows have round heads and pargeting.	II
109 Princess Street; 53.47646°N 2.23870°W		1863–64	A warehouse, later offices, in red brick on a rusticated plinth, with sandstone dressings, a ground floor cornice, sill bands, a decorative frieze, and a bracketed top cornice. It is in the style of an Italian palazzo, and has four storeys and a basement, a symmetrical front of eight bays, and ten bays on the sides. The corners are chamfered with quoins. On the ground floor is a round-arched arcade above the windows and the doorway, which has a rusticated surround, polished shafts with carved capitals, a moulded head with a volute keystone and carved spandrels, a cornice, and ornamental iron balcony. The windows on the upper floors are sashes with keystones; on the first and second storeys they have segmental heads and on the top floor they have round heads.	II
8 Minshull Street and 42 Bloom Street; 53.47855°N 2.23600°W		Mid to late 19th century	A warehouse, later used for other purposes, it is in red brick with sandstone dressings, decorated sill bands, and a cornice with a corbel table. The building is in the style of a palazzo, on a corner site, and has four storeys with a basement, five bays on Minshull Street, and eight on Bloom Street. On Minshull Street is a large architrave containing paired round-headed doorways that have colonnettes with foliated caps, a roundel, a hood mould, and carved spandrels. The windows are sashes, and many are paired. On Bloom Street is a segmental-headed loading bay, a round-headed doorway and at the top is a gabled attic.	II
11 Bloom Street; 53.47830°N 2.23583°W		Mid to late 19th century	A multi-purpose building, later offices, it is in red brick with some sandstone, and has channelled corner pilasters, a square plan, four storeys and a basement, and eight bays. The ground floor is in sandstone, at the right is a round-headed doorway with a keyed moulded surround and a dentilled cornice, and at the left is a rectangular loading entrance. Between them are almost continuous windows behind a colonnade of square columns with a plain frieze and a moulded cornice. The windows are sashes, those on the first floor with triangular-headed lintels.	II
45 Dale Street; 53.48101°N 2.23287°W		Mid to late 19th century	A warehouse in red brick with some sandstone dressings and a slate roof. It has four storeys with a basement, a front of three bays, and ten bays on the left return. There is a plinth, a modillioned sill band, bracketed eaves, and a polychromic set-back parapet. The round-headed doorway has an architrave with pilasters, imposts, and a modillioned segmental cornice. The ground floor windows have been altered, and on the floors above are sash windows.	II
45 and 47 Newton Street; 53.48187°N 2.23322°W		Mid to late 19th century	Originally a warehouse, later used for other purposes, it is in red brick with a gritstone plinth, ground floor and dressings. The building has a rectangular plan, five storeys with a basement, and twelve bays. The doorway to No. 47 is round-headed with pilastered jambs and a grooved keystone, and the windows have segmental heads. The left bay is wider and contains a rectangular loading entrance. At the rear the windows have wedge lintels.	II
49 Newton Street, 18 Hilton Street, 10 Stevenson Square; 53.48211°N 2.23307°W		Mid to late 19th century	A warehouse, later used for other purposes, with a stone plinth, a rusticated gritstone ground floor, and red brick above with a sill band and a parapet. It has a U-shaped plan, five storeys and a basement, six bays on Newton Street, eleven on Hilton Street, and three on Stevenson Square. In Newton Street there is a round-headed doorway with a rusticated surround, a lion's mask keystone, and a cornice. The windows are sashes, most with segmental heads.	II
57 Faulkner Street; 53.47814°N 2.23998°W		Mid to late 19th century	A warehouse later used for other purposes, it is in red brick with sandstone dressings and sill bands. It has a long rectangular plan, with five storeys and a basement, and three bays. On the ground floor is a doorway with a panelled stone surround and altered windows. Above, the windows have gauged brick heads and most are sashes.	II
64 and 66 Dale Street; 53.48054°N 2.23277°W		Mid to late 19th century	A warehouse in red brick with sandstone dressings, sill bands, a cornice with a corbel-table, and a slate roof. It has a rectangular plan, four storeys and a basement, and a front of twelve bays. On the front is a rectangular loading bay and two round-headed doorways with keystones. The windows are sashes with segmental heads.	II
Gardens Hotel and shops 53.48104°N 2.23485°W		Mid to late 19th century	The hotel, with shops below, consists of two buildings, originally warehouses, the later one dated 1904. The older building is in sandstone with a slate roof, four storeys and an attic, and three bays. Features include a balustraded parapet flanking a gable with pinnacles, with hipped dormers behind. The newer building to the left has a Portland stone façade and a slate roof, and is in Baroque style. There are five storeys and two bays, with four-storey canted bay windows and a balcony. At the top is a parapet with two pierced panels and a cartouche with a semicircular pediment and an obelisk.	II
Minshull House, Minshull Street; 53.47844°N 2.23550°W		Mid to late 19th century	A warehouse, later offices, with the ground floor in sandstone, red brick above, a band, an eaves cornice, and a slate roof. It is in the style of a palazzo, on a corner site, and has a rectangular plan with a splayed corner. There are five storeys and a basement, eight bays on the front, and six on the sides. The sash windows on the ground floor have segmental heads, on the first floor they have lintels, and above they have flat heads. The doorway in the corner has a segmental head, a moulded architrave, a keystone, and pilasters. At the rear is a full-height loading slot with a hoist canopy.	II
Mintierna House; 53.47755°N 2.23559°W		Mid to late 19th century (probable)	A shipping warehouse in red brick with a front in sandstone, sill bands, rusticated quoins, a moulded cornice, and a low parapet. It has a long rectangular plan, four storeys and a basement, and four bays. In the left bay is a round-headed entrance with a rusticated surround and steps leading to a recessed doorway. Most of the windows are casements with moulded architraves.	II
Charlotte House; 53.47932°N 2.24016°W		c. 1865	A warehouse by Edward Walters in the style of an Italian palazzo, later used as offices, it is in sandstone and light red brick with sandstone dressings, a ground floor cornice, quoins, bands, and a top modillioned cornice. There are five storeys at the front, four at the rear, a basement, nine bays on Charlotte Street, four on George Street, and another lower nine bays beyond. The ground floor is rusticated, and has a central round-headed doorway with an architrave, carved spandrels, and a cornice. The windows on the ground and first floors have segmental heads and architraves, on the second floor they have architraves and pediments, and above they have square heads, with rosettes above the third floor windows.	II
Chorlton Old Mill; 53.47212°N 2.24310°W		1866	A former cotton spinning mill converted into living accommodation, it is in brick with panelled corner pilasters and a slate roof. There are six storeys and a basement, and side of 14 and eight bays. The windows are rectangular and have flat heads.	II
London Warehouse; 53.47933°N 2.23115°W		1867	The warehouse was built for the Manchester, Sheffield and Lincolnshire Railway, and has been converted into a hotel. It is in brown brick on an iron frame, with stone dressings, seven storeys, nine bays on the front and ten on the sides. The bays are recessed between pilasters, and there are quoins, a cornice, and a parapet with four gables. The windows and wagon arches have segmental heads.	II
Grand Hotel; 53.47972°N 2.23510°W		1867–68	Originally a warehouse, converted into a hotel in 1883, and later into flats. It is in sandstone, and has five storeys with a basement, two later attic storeys, eleven bays on the front, and twelve bays on the sides. On the ground floor are rusticated piers and a cornice, a modillioned cornice above the second floor, a pilastered third floor, a panelled frieze, and a top cornice. Above the round-headed doorway is a segmental arched cornice on consoles. The windows on the ground floor have segmental heads, on the first floor they have pediments, and above they have round heads.	II
City Police Courts; 53.47848°N 2.23506°W		1867–1873	Designed by Thomas Worthington, the building is in red brick with sandstone dressings and a slate roof. It has 2 1/2 storeys with a basement, and a front of eleven bays, with a tower on the left end and a turret at the right end. It is on a moulded stone plinth, and has impost bands, a sill band, a Lombard frieze, a parapet, and a central gable flanked by tourelles. There is a central arched doorway, and another doorway to the right.	II*
56 Faulkner Street; 53.47803°N 2.24050°W		1868	A warehouse, later a restaurant, it is in red brick on a sandstone plinth, with some sandstone dressings, pilasters, moulded cornices over the ground and second floors, and a slate roof. It has an L-shaped plan, with a long rear wing, three storeys with a basement, and four bays, the left bay wider and recessed. On the ground floor are segmental-headed doorways with keystones. On the upper floors are paired sash windows with segmental heads.	II
101 Princess Street; 53.47719°N 2.23953°W		1869	A warehouse, later converted into other uses, it is in red brick on a plinth, with sandstone dressings, rusticated quoins, a ground floor cornice, sill bands, and a prominent top cornice. It is in the style of an Italian palazzo, and has five storeys and a basement, and sides of nine bays. The round-headed doorway has pilasters, and a volute keystone. The windows have segmental heads, on the first floor they have architraves with cornices or pediments, and above they have keystones.	II
55 Faulkner Street and 18 Nicholas Street; 53.47819°N 2.23981°W		1870	A warehouse later used for other purposes, in brown brick with sandstone dressings, a bracketed cornice, and a slate roof. It is in Italianate style, and has four storeys and a basement, five bays in Nicholas Street and four on Faulkner Street. The ground floor has a sill band and a Lombard frieze, and on the upper floors are pilasters with decorative imposts. The windows are sashes; on the ground floor they have segmental heads with bricks imitating voussoirs and decorated tympani, and on the upper floors are two windows in each bay, on the top floor with round heads, and below with segmental heads.	II
3 Brazil Street; 53.47647°N 2.23700°W		c. 1870 (probable)	A former warehouse with the ground floor in sandstone, and above in red brick with sandstone dressings, cornices, and sill bands. There are five storeys and a basement, and a symmetrical front of five bays, the middle three bays projecting slightly. The basement is rusticated and the ground floor contains a loading bay on the left, a doorway on the right, and windows between, all with elliptical heads. The windows above are sashes, some with segmental heads, some with square heads, and others with round heads.	II
17 George Street and 12 Charlotte Street; 53.47916°N 2.23985°W		c. 1870 (probable)	A former warehouse in sandstone ashlar on a corner site, with five storeys and a basement, two bays on Charlotte Street and eight bays along George Street. The basement is rusticated and punch-dressed, the ground floor is channelled, above are pilasters and string courses, and at the top is a prominent bracketed cornice. The doorway has a square head and a carved surround, and to the right is a window with a scrolled keystone. The windows are sashes, some with segmental heads and keystones, and others have a Lombard frieze above.	II
Former Pickles Building; 53.47754°N 2.23975°W		c. 1870	A warehouse, later a hotel, in sandstone on a chamfered plinth, with a Lombard frieze, moulded bands, carved impost bands, a bracketed cornice, and a slate mansard roof. It is on a corner site, and has five storeys, a basement and attic, three bays on Portland Street and six on Princess Street, with curved corners. On the corners are segmental-headed doorways with pilasters, set-in shafts with foliated caps, keystones, carved spandrels, and cornices on shafts with carved heads. The windows are sashes; on the ground floor they have arched heads and hood moulds, on the first floor they have flat heads, and above they have arched heads. Between the first and second floors are quatrefoil panels.	II
27 Sackville Street; 53.47727°N 2.23738°W		c. 1870–1880	A warehouse in red brick with sandstone dressings, a punch-dressed plinth, a channelled ground floor, sill bands, a bracketed frieze, a moulded cornice, and a slate roof. There are four storeys with a basement, a front of nine bays and four bays along the sides. In the left bay is a doorway with an elaborate fanlight, and to the right are segmental-arched basement openings with iron railings. The windows are sashes, those on the ground floor having lintels, and on the first floor they have segmental heads, imposts, keystones and hood moulds.	II
Basil House; 53.47718°N 2.24043°W		c. 1870–1880	A warehouse, later used for other purposes, in red brick with sandstone dressings and a slate roof. There are five storeys with a basement, and six bays. There is a band and a bracketed cornice on the ground floor, and above are pilasters, bands, a stepped frieze and a cornice. The doorway has a segmental head, pilasters, and a lettered frieze. Most of the windows are paired, some with cornices, and some with keystones and impost bands.	II
Brazil House; 53.47667°N 2.23898°W		c. 1870–1880	A pair of former warehouses in yellow brick on a chamfered plinth, with sandstone dressings, saw-tooth sill bands, and impost bands. They are on an island site, and have four storeys with basements, and each warehouse has a front of two bays. The paired doorways are in the centre, and have pilaster jambs, stiff-leaved imposts, and segmental heads with keystones. The windows are sashes.	II
Halls Buildings; 53.48069°N 2.23398°W		c. 1870–1880	Originally warehouses and offices, later used for other purposes, the building is in sandstone with cornices, sill bands, and a bracketed cornice at the top. There are five storeys and ten bays. The outer bays project slightly, on the ground floor of each is a square-headed doorway with banded pilasters, segmental-headed fanlights, and cornices on decorative consoles, and on the upper floors are single-light windows with round heads. Between the doorways are modern shop fronts. In the middle bays of the upper floors are arcades of four-light windows, on the first and second floors with round heads, on the third floor with segmental heads, and on the top floor with flat heads, all with shafts, imposts and carved capitals.	II
16 Nicholas Street; 53.47834°N 2.24017°W		1872–1875	A warehouse by Alfred Waterhouse later used for other purposes, it has a ground floor in sandstone, and above it is in red brick with sandstone dressings, and it has a slate roof. There are five storeys, a basement and an attic, a symmetrical front of ten bays, with five bays on the sides. The end bays project slightly and have coped gables. On the upper floors are quoins, sill bands, a bracketed cornice, and parapets between the gables. The central round-headed doorway has pilasters and a moulded surround. The windows are sashes and have heads of various types.	II
70 and 72 Portland Street and 20 Nicholas Street; 53.47806°N 2.23954°W		1873	A warehouse later used for other purposes, it is in sandstone with some marble dressings, bands between the floors, a bracketed cornice, a blocking course, and some antefixae. The building is in the style of a palazzo, with a square plan, five storeys and a basement, and sides of four bays plus a curved bay on the corner. The doorways have round heads, voussoirs, and keystones. The basement windows have segmental heads, the windows on the first and third floors have round heads, and those on the second and top floors have square heads. The first floor window on the corner has a balcony.	II
Chepstow House; 53.47514°N 2.24494°W		1874	A warehouse later converted into flats, it is in red brick on a sandstone plinth, with sandstone dressings, a band, an eaves cornice, and a slate roof. There are three storeys, a basement and attics, and a long façade canted at the south end. On the corner is an octagonal oriel window with a domed turret, and along the roof are dormers with coped gables, some with finials. The large round-arched entrance has a moulded surround and a gable with a Lombard frieze. Most of the windows are casements imitating sash windows.	II
2 Harter Street; 53.47664°N 2.24021°W		Late 19th century	A former warehouse in red brick on a stone plinth, with sandstone dressings and cornices. It has a trapezoidal plan, with four storeys, a basement and attic, and fronts of four bays. The windows are sashes, with two in each bay on the lower three floors. On the top floor are giant arcades that have pilasters with capitals containing swags, and large semicircular windows with small panes. The attic floor is treated as a parapet and contains three-light windows.	II
12 Harter Street and 104 Bloom Street; 53.47630°N 2.23999°W	—	Late 19th century	A warehouse, later used as offices, in red brick with sandstone dressings, a channelled ground floor and cornice, pilastered upper floors, and a bracketed eaves cornice. There are four storeys with a basement, and nine bays. The main doorway has an architrave with a pediment, and there is a wide doorway with a segmental head in the return. The windows on the lower floors have segmental heads with mullioned and transoms, and on the top floor are paired round-headed sash windows.	II
32 and 34 Dale Street and 17–25 Newton Street; 53.48145°N 2.23376°W		Late 19th century	Formerly warehouses, later used for other purposes, the building is in red brick with sandstone dressings, and has a slate mansard roof. There is a rectangular plan, four storeys with an attic, sides of five and four bays, and a curved bay on the corner. There are sill bands, quoined strips on the corners, and a bracketed cornice. On the ground floor are modern shop fronts, and a doorway with a segmental head, and architrave and a pediment. The windows are sashes, and those in the attic have segmental heads with keystones and gablets with finials.	II
36 Dale Street and 14 and 16 Newton Street; 53.48118°N 2.23337°W		Late 19th century	A warehouse, later shops, in red brick with sandstone dressings and a slate roof. It has a trapezoid plan, four storeys with a basement and attic, four bays on Newton Street and five bays on Dale Street. There are string courses, a moulded cornice at the top, and a parapet. The windows are sashes, with dormers in the attics, and the doorways have square fanlights and cornices on consoles.	II
47 Dale Street; 53.48096°N 2.23278°W		Late 19th century	A warehouse in brick with some sandstone dressings and a slate roof, it has a basement and four storeys, and a front of four bays. It has corner pilasters, a sill band, a moulded cornice, and a parapet. The doorway has pilasters, imposts, a decorated lintel and a segmental canopy. Above each ground floor window is a swag, and the windows on the upper floors are sashes.	II
56 Dale Street; 53.48084°N 2.23304°W		c. 1875	A warehouse with a sandstone plinth and ground floor and brick above, with cornices and pilasters, and in Venetian Gothic style. It has a rectangular plan with four storeys and a basement, a symmetrical front of seven bays, and twelve bays on the right return. The central round-headed doorway has polished granite colonnettes, a lintel with an inscribed crest, a fanlight, and an arch with voussoirs. On the ground floor are paired windows with granite colonnettes and linked hood moulds, the first floor windows have flat heads, sandstone lintels and diapering above, and the second floor windows have segmental heads and impost bands; all the windows are sashes.	II
Kingsley House; 53.48127°N 2.23405°W		Late 19th century	A warehouse in red brick with a sandstone plinth and dressings and a slate mansard roof. It has a rectangular plan, three storeys with a basement and attics, and five bays with curved corners. Above the ground floor is a frieze and a cornice, and above the top floor is a prominent cornice on brackets. The doorway has an architrave with a swag on the frieze and an open pediment. The windows are sashes.	II
52 and 54 Faulkner Street; 53.47813°N 2.24039°W		1876	A pair of warehouses, later altered, with the ground floor in sandstone on a punched plinth, and above in red brick with bands, and a parapet on a blind arcade of corbelled bricks. It has a long rectangular plan with four storeys and a basement, and six bays. The ground floor has a segmental-headed arcade with moulded imposts above doorways and windows. On the upper floors are sash windows with brick corbelling in the jambs, and at the rear are full-height loading bays under a parapet.	II
77–83 Piccadilly; 53.48055°N 2.23390°W		1877	A warehouse, shops and restaurant in sandstone with pilasters, pargetted eaves decorated with fruit and leaves, a parapet, and a slate roof. There are four storeys, four unequal bays, and a canted corner on the right. On the second bay of the roof is a half-hipped attic, and on the right corner is an octagonal wooden turret. On the ground floor are shops with the original surrounds, and on the upper floors are arcaded windows that have shafts with foliated capitals; on the first floor they have flat heads, on the second floor segmental heads, and on the top floor arched heads. In the attic is a 16-light transomed window.	II
Star and Garter public house 53.47604°N 2.22733°W		1877	The public house is in red brick with sandstone dressings and a slate roof, and is in Queen Anne style. It has three storeys and a symmetrical front of five bays. The central bay has a square-headed doorway with an architrave, above which is a window with a segmental head, and over that is a half-dormer with corbelled pilasters and a shaped gable surmounted by a segmental pediment. In the outer bays are round-headed windows on the ground floor, windows with segmental heads on the middle floor and half-dormers with corbelled pilasters and pediments with a checker-board pattern. On the right corner is a canted bay that has a doorway with a Baroque surround and a half-dormer with the date.	II
Princess Buildings; 53.47818°N 2.24178°W		c. 1877–78	Warehouse and offices later used for various purposes, in sandstone on a plinth, with a decorated ground floor cornice, bands, a bracketed top cornice, an open arcaded parapet, chimneys treated as pinnacles, and a slate mansard roof with dormers. There are four storeys, a basement and attics, and a symmetrical front of twelve bays. In the centre is a segmental-headed entrance with pilasters, foliated imposts, and a volute keystone. The windows are sashes with moulded surrounds and mullions.	II
Former Adult Deaf and Dumb Institute; 53.47024°N 2.23649°W		1878	The building is in sandstone ashlar with a lettered frieze above the doorway, corner pilasters on the first floor, a slate roof, and a central gable with a cross finial. It is in Gothic style, with two storeys and a basement, and a symmetrical front of three bays. The arched doorway has a moulded head, carved imposts, a hood mould, and a carved shield. Above this is a sculpture of The Good Shepherd under a gabled canopy, and in the outer bays are paired arched windows.	II
1 Piccadilly; 53.48188°N 2.23806°W		1879	A shop, probably with an iron frame, clad in wood and stucco and with a slate roof. It is on a corner site, with four storeys and an attic. There is one bay on Piccadilly, a curved bay on the corner, and six bays on Tib Street. On the ground floor are modern shop fronts, and between the bays on the upper floors are cast iron columns with stiff-leaf capitals. Each bay contains a canted bay window, and between the floors are panelled friezes and cornices. On the roof are pedimented dormers, and on the corner is a circular turret with a spirelet.	II
Former Newton Street Police Station; 53.48241°N 2.23240°W		1879	The police station, later a police museum, is in brick on a plinth, with sandstone dressings, a sill band, a moulded cornice, a blocking course, a parapet, and a slate roof. It has a rectangular plan, two storeys, a front of four bays and seven bays along the side. There is a round-headed doorway with a moulded surround, a keystone, a pediment on fluted consoles, and a tympanum containing the royal coat of arms. The windows are mullioned and transomed with imposts and keystones.	II
36 Princess Street; 53.47760°N 2.24054°W		1880	A warehouse, later used for other purposes, it is in sandstone with bands between the floors, and at the top a frieze decorated between the brackets of the cornice. The building has a rectangular plan on an island site with curved corners. There are four storeys and a basement, and ten bays plus the corners. The central doorway has a moulded round head, rusticated jambs, and carved cresting. The windows are sashes with different surrounds on each floor.	II
110–114 Portland Street; 53.47667°N 2.24193°W		1880	A warehouse designed by Charles Henry Heathcote in Romanesque style, later used for other purposes, it has a ground floor in sandstone, in brick with sandstone dressings above, and a slate roof. There are three storeys with a basement and attic, and five bays. The ground floor has a cornice, above are brick pilasters, bands, and an eaves cornice on a brick corbel table. On the ground floor are doorways and a wagon entry. The windows are sashes; on the middle floor they are round headed, those in the outer bays with segmental open pediments. On the top floor they have square heads, and in the attic is a flat-headed dormer containing three groups of three round-headed windows.	II
Central House; 53.47593°N 2.23844°W		1880	A warehouse later used for other purposes, it is in red brick with red sandstone dressings, string courses, and a slate roof with attic dormers and obelisk finials. It is in Scottish Baronial style, with four storeys, a basement and attics, and a five-bay front. On the corners are tourelles with lancet windows on moulded corbels rising to conical roofs. In the second and fourth bays are crow-stepped gables with coupled cylindrical chimneys. The round-headed doorway has a moulded surround and a balustraded balcony. The windows are sashes, some with segmental heads, and some with segmental pediments.	II
Langley Buildings, Princess Street; 53.47702°N 2.23983°W		1880–1882	A warehouse, later offices, with an iron frame, a sandstone front, and a red brick return. There is a ground floor cornice, bands, a top cornice, and a curved upstand on the corner. The building has five storeys and a basement, a front of three bays, a canted corner, and ten bays on the return. On the front is a doorway on the right with a Jacobean-style fanlight and a lettered cornice, and a square-headed doorway in the corner with a moulded surround. Above this is a moulded corbel supporting a two-storey oriel window with a shaped parapet, over which is a three-light window with a parapet and urn finials, and over that is a two-light window with an inscribed parapet. On the front is a three-storey oriel window, along the return are octagonal pilasters between the bays, and the windows are sashes.	II
Lionesse House; 53.47623°N 2.23886°W		c. 1880–1890	A warehouse, later used for other purposes, in red brick on a stone plinth, with sandstone dressings, cornices, bands, a parapet, and a slate mansard roof with pedimented dormers. It is on an island site, with four storeys, basement and attics, and a front of eight bays and a canted corner. The ground floor is arcaded with round-headed arches over paired windows with keystones and linked hood moulds. The doorway has pilasters, a keystone, carved spandrels, and a cornice on brackets. Alternate bays contain two-storey oriel windows with balustraded parapets. The other windows are square-headed sashes with stone lintels.	II
Regency House with Barclays Bank; 53.47629°N 2.23632°W		c. 1880–1890	A warehouse, later a bank and offices, with an iron frame, in sandstone on a punch-dressed plinth, with dressings in red brick, piers on the ground floor with a frieze above, banded piers on the upper floors, a cornice with a Lombard frieze, and a parapet with a pedestal over each pier. It is on an island site, and has five storeys with a basement, and fronts of six bays with a canted corner. In the corner is a doorway with a segmental pediment, and at the top of the bay is an octagonal lantern.	II
Rhodesia House; 53.47651°N 2.23929°W		c. 1880–1890	The former warehouse is in red brick on a stone plinth, with sandstone dressings, cornices, string courses, and a hipped slate roof with pedimented gables and corner finials. There are four storeys, a basement and attics, a front of three bays with chamfered corners, and sides of nine bays. The round-headed doorway has pilasters, carved capitals, a keystone, swags, and a cornice on brackets. The ground floor windows have round heads with keystones, and above the outer bays have tiered segmental bay windows with panels containing swags between them. In the attic are dormers with pediments.	II
Transact House; 53.47679°N 2.23961°W		c. 1880–1890	A warehouse, later offices, in red brick on a stone plinth, with sandstone dressings, brick pilasters, moulded cornices, and a slate roof with pedimented attic dormers. It has a trapeziform plan on island site, four storeys with a basement and an attic, a front of nine bays, five-bays returns, and curved corners. In the third bay is a round-headed doorway, and above this and in the sixth bay is a two-storey oriel window. The windows are transomed, mullioned and transomed, or cross windows.	II
15 and 17 Piccadilly and 1–13 Oldham Street; 53.48167°N 2.23701°W		1881	A block of shops with offices above on a corner site in sandstone with a slate roof. It has a trapezoid plan, five storeys with an attic, three bays on Piccadilly, a canted corner bay, and four wide bays along Oldham Street. On the ground floor are modern shop fronts. On most of the upper floors are chamfered piers, between the floors are friezes, there is a cornice over the third floor, and a ramped parapet over the fourth floor. In the corner bay an oriel window rises to a turret with a spirelet. The windows are sashes with different shaped heads on each floor.	II
Train shed and undercroft, Piccadilly Station; 53.47701°N 2.22956°W		1881 (probable)	The train shed has a brick undercroft and side walls, an iron frame, and a glass roof. In the side walls are large round-headed windows. The roof is carried on cast iron columns with semicircular arched spans.	II
26–30 Princess Street; 53.47800°N 2.24129°W		1883	A former warehouse with a ground floor in sandstone on a chamfered plinth, with red brick above, and a hipped slate roof. It has four storeys with a basement and 14 bays with chamfered corners. Above the ground floor is a frieze, and on the upper floors are pilasters rising to chimneys treated as pinnacles, cornices, and a parapet. On the front are paired round-headed doorways that have colonnettes with carved caps, elaborate consoles, and an open pediment with keystones and swags. In the corners are doorways with fanlights above which are oriel windows, and the windows are sashes, some with mullions.	II
34 Princess Street; 53.47783°N 2.24093°W		1883	A warehouse later used for other purposes, in red brick on a punch-dressed plinth, with sandstone dressings, a ground floor cornice, bands, and a slate roof. It has a rectangular plan with chamfered corners, five storeys with a basement, and five bays plus the corners. The second and fourth bays are flanked by semi-octagonal brick pilasters that rise to stone pinnacles with gables between. The arched doorway has a moulded surround and a crocketed gablet. In the basement are square windows, and above the windows are sashes with stone surrounds.	II
Eastern House and Portland House; 53.47730°N 2.24013°W		1887	A warehouse, later used for other purposes, in red brick with sandstone dressings. There are banded pilasters and a bracketed cornice on the ground floor, and above are bands, moulded terracotta panels, and a frieze. The building is on a corner site, with five storeys, a basement and attics, and three bays on Portland Street, seven bays on Princess Street, and a canted bay on the corner. Three of the bays have two-storey segmental oriel windows with a dentilled cornice and a parapet, above which is a hipped gable with a finial. In the other bays are three-light windows, on the first floor with segmental pediments, on the third floor with segmental heads and keystones, and in the attic are flat-headed dormers. The doorways and loading bays have square heads.	II
St Margaret's Chambers; 53.48106°N 2.23434°W		c. 1890	Shops with offices above in brick with sandstone dressings and some terracotta, and a slate roof. The building is in Elizabethan style with a trapezoidal plan, four storeys and an attic, and eight bays with a chamfered corner. On the front are three cornices and a decorated frieze, and at the top are four shaped gables. There is a doorway that has an elliptical arch with a keystone and decorated spandrelss. On the ground floor are modern shop fronts, and on the first floor are recessed canted three-light windows.	II
Palace Theatre; 53.47499°N 2.24106°W		1891	The theatre was designed by Alfred Darbyshire, the interior was altered in 1913 by Bertie Crewe, and it was refronted in 1956. The theatre is clad in brick and faced with buff glazed terracotta, and has a slate roof. It is in debased Classical style, and has three storeys and a basement. In the interior are two segmentally-curved balconies, two tiers of boxes on Atlantes and tetrastyle architraves of giant fluted Ionic columns, and a circular dome.	II
Former Refuge Assurance Company offices 53.47427°N 2.24051°W		1891–1895	Originally the offices of an insurance agency, later converted into a hotel, the building was designed by Alfred Waterhouse, it was doubled in size and a clock tower added in 1910–12 by his son, Paul, and further extended in 1932. It has a steel frame and is clad in red brick with dressings in dark brown and buff terracotta. There are four storeys with attics and basements, and an irregular plan on a corner site. On the corner is a three-bay octagonal turret with a dome, along Whitworth Street are two blocks of six bays, and along Oxford Street are six bays, the clock tower and a further six bays. The tower has a base of Dalbeattie granite, an entrance that has a three-bay Baroque porch with a round-headed arch, engaged Tuscan semi-columns, and a broken segmental pediment. At the top of the tower is a prominent cornice and a Baroque cupola. Other features include undulating parapets and tiered shaped gables.	II*
Institute of Science and Technology; 53.47589°N 2.23518°W		1895–1912	Part of the University of Manchester, it is in red brick with dressings in red sandstone and terracotta, and has moulded bands, an eaves cornice, and a slate mansard roof. The building has a large rectangular plan with two internal courtyards, and is in French Renaissance style. There are five storeys basements and attics, and elaborate shaped gables. The windows are mullioned and transomed, with rusticated pilasters, moulded aprons and entablatures. The central bay projects and contains an arched entrance. On the Whitworth Street front is a cupola.	II
Tootal, Broadhurst and Lee Building; 53.47527°N 2.24216°W		1896–1898	Originally a textile warehouse, later used as offices, it is in red brick with dressings in buff and yellow terracotta, and is in Baroque style. There are five storeys with basement and attics, a front of seven bays, canted corners, and twelve bays along Great Bridgewater Street. Above the ground floor is a cornice, on the first floor are piers that act as pedestals to a giant Corinthian colonnade carrying an arcade of round-headed windows. At the top is a modillioned cornice, and an attic treated as a parapet, raised in the centres. On the corners are semi-octagonal turrets with cupolas and finials. The central doorway has a round head with a banded surround, banded columns, a broken pediment, and a cartouche.	II*
Sheena Simon Sixth Form College; 53.47665°N 2.23513°W		1897–1901	Originally a school it was extended in about 1911. The building is in red brick with terracotta dressings, pilasters, string courses, a cornice, a parapet, and a Welsh slate roof. There are mainly four storeys and a basement, a five-bay entrance front and a rear wing of 24 bays. On the roof is a structure with a balustrade and a lantern, and on the corner is a tower-like feature, curved in the lower part and polygonal above, surmounted by an octagonal drum and a tall lantern. Features along the side include pediments, gables and a pavilion roof with cresting.	II
Watts Brothers; 53.48220°N 2.23402°W		1898	Formerly a warehouse, later offices, the building is in red brick with sandstone dressings and a slate roof, and is in free Elizabethan style,. It has a long rectangular plan, with four storeys, a basement and attic, a front of four bays, with two similar bays in the right return followed by eight glazed bays. There is a cornice above the ground floor, and the outer bays project slightly and have shaped gables with ball finials. In the left bay is a round-headed doorway with convex jambs, a moulded head with a keystone cartouche, and a cornice on elongated consoles.	II
107 Piccadilly; 53.47981°N 2.23306°W		1899	Originally a showroom and warehouse on a corner site, designed by Heathcote, later a hotel, it has an iron frame, a cladding of red sandstone and brick, and a roof of slate and glass. There are five storeys with a basement and an attic, five bays on Piccadilly, and five bays on Lena Street. In the first bay is a round-headed entrance, and above it is a window with a swan-neck pediment; the other openings on the ground floor have been altered. The windows on the upper floors are of various types. There are three turrets, the one on the corner rising from a corbel, and above the middle three bays is a decorated gable.	II
Former Horrocks, Crewdson and Company Warehouse; 53.47994°N 2.23239°W		1899 (probable)	The warehouse, by Heathcote, has an iron frame with cladding in red brick, sandstone dressings, and a slate roof. There are five storeys and a basement, five bays on Lena Street, and four on Dale Street. On the ground floor are sandstone piers, between the upper floors are string courses and bands, and at the top is a corniced entablature and pilastrades. In the left corner is a segmental-headed doorway with an architrave with engaged columns on pedestals, a swan-neck pediment containing a cartouche, and a fanlight. On the corners are octagonal turrets, and most of the windows are sashes.	II
Asia House; 53.47504°N 2.23820°W		1900–1910	Originally a shipping and packing warehouse designed by Harry S. Fairhurst in free Baroque style, and later converted into offices, it has an iron frame, a polished granite plinth and is clad in sandstone and buff brick. The building has an irregular trapezoid plan, six storeys with basements and attics, and sides of seven bays plus chamfered corners. On the front the lower three storeys are rusticated, and on the top two storeys is an Ionic pilastrade on panelled pedestals. Above this is a plain frieze, a modillioned cornice, a pilastered attic storey, and a parapet. On the ground floor are round-headed doorways with voussoirs, the central doorway also with a decorative keystone and a wrought iron fanlight. Other features include canted oriel windows, and windows with open pediments and balconies.	II*
Oddfellows Hall; 53.47086°N 2.23454°W		1900–1910	The building is in brick with a façade of cream terracotta, giant pilasters and Ionic columns on the first and second floors, a rusticated ground floor, a prominent modillioned cornice, and a balustraded parapet. It is in Edwardian Baroque style, with three storeys and a symmetrical front of seven bays. In the centre is a round-headed doorway with a cartouche keystone, and a fanlight, and at the top of the bay is a segmental open pediment. The windows have decorative architraves.	II
3 Dale Street; 53.48245°N 2.23515°W		Early 20th century	Originally a millinery warehouse, later used for other purposes, it has an internal structure of cast iron columns, it is clad in red brick and ochre terracotta, and has a plinth of polished pink granite. The entrance block facing Dale Street has five storeys with a basement and four bays, there is a splayed corner, and a rear block of three storeys with a basement and attic and six bays. The corner has a doorway with a segmental head, a fanlight, and a segmental hood on decorated consoles. At the top is a dentilled moulded segmentally-arched cornice, cartouches on the flanking piers, and a dome. The left bay on the front has a segmental open pediment. Some of the windows have segmental heads, and the others have flat heads.	II
22 Dale Street; 53.48176°N 2.23443°W		c. 1900	Formerly a warehouse, later used for other purposes, it has a cast iron frame, and is clad in red brick with sandstone dressings, and has glazed white brick at the sides and rear. The building has an L-shaped plan, four storeys and a basement and attics, eight bays on Dale Street, four on Lever Street, and a three-sided canted corner. There is a plinth, a sill band, a bracketed cornice, a parapet on Dale Street, and gabled attics on Lever Street. In the corner is an open arcade of three round-headed arches on polished granite columns, and at the top is a hexagonal two-stage turret with a finial. On the Lever Street front are two round-headed ground floor windows with pilasters, carved spandrels, and a panelled band above, and the end bay on Dale Street has a canted oriel window.	II
49 and 51 Dale Street and 30 and 32 Hilton Street; 53.48115°N 2.23192°W		c. 1900	A range of warehouses in a U-shaped plan, with fronts on Dale Street, passing along Tariff Street, turning along Hilton Street to bridge Lizard Street, and returning along China Lane. They have an iron frame, clad in red brick and terracotta, with some sandstone dressings, a roof mainly in slate, and for or five storeys over basements. The office front has three bays, with chamfered corners containing round-headed doorways with keystones and cornices on brackets. The windows are sashes between which are pilasters rising to chimneys.	II
Former electricity power station 53.47611°N 2.23933°W		1901	The building is in red brick with sandstone dressings. It has a trapezoid plan, and stands alongside the Rochdale Canal, with seven bays on Winster Street and five on Bloom Street. In the lower part are arcades that have large round-headed arches with stone banded piers, keystones, and openings with mullions and transoms. In the upper parts are pilasters and cornices, and at the top is a parapet. It also has a large octagonal chimney.	II
Queen Victoria Monument; 53.48112°N 2.23663°W		1901	The monument by Onslow Ford is in Piccadilly Gardens. It is in Portland stone with a square base of six steps, a low plinth with a moulded foot and cornice, a stone throne in Baroque style with a decorative broken pediment and a bronze grotesque. On the throne is a bronze statue of a seated Queen Victoria. At the rear are engaged Corinthian columns and a round-headed arch containing a statue of a female with two babies.	II
Police and Fire Station; 53.47695°N 2.23192°W		1901–1906	The building, no longer in use for its original purposes, is in red brick with yellow terracotta dressings and a slate roof. It has an irregular quadrilateral plan around a courtyard on a triangular site, and is in Edwardian Baroque style. The front on London Road is symmetrical, and has a four-storey central range with eleven bays, flanked by three-storey three-bay wings, with a modillioned eaves cornice. In the centre is a large round-headed arch with a lettered inner lintel. Elsewhere there are turrets, domes, corner tourelles, and a southeast tower with a domed belfry.	II*
35 Dale Street; 53.48125°N 2.23298°W		1903	A warehouse with an internal steel structure, faced with red brick and pink terracotta on a granite plinth, it has a rectangular plan with chamfered corners. There are six storeys and a basement, between the corners are four bays, and along the sides are five bays. Above, there is a modillioned cornice and a parapet with upstands. The corners are flanked by semi-octagonal shafts rising to domed pinnacles. Between them are two-storey oriel windows, and at the top is a pedimented gablet with an oculus. The windows are sashes.	II
Sevendale House; 53.48226°N 2.23471°W		1903	Originally a general warehouse, later used for other purposes, it has an internal structure of a steel frame with concrete floors, it has a polished granite plinth and is clad in red sandstone brick and terracotta, it has a green slate roof, and is in Jacobean style. The building has a long rectangular plan with four storeys with basements and attics. The entrance front on Dale Street has five wide bays with splayed corners, and the Lever Street front has eleven bays. On the front are pilasters rising to semi-octagonal shafts and surmounted by domed finials. At the top is a parapet and shaped gables. In the centre is a round-headed doorway with a decorated surround including a keystone cartouche. Other features include two-storey canted oriel windows.	II
Joshua Hoyle Building, including Roby House; 53.47915°N 2.23319°W		1904–1906	Formerly a textile warehouse, later converted for other uses, it has a steel frame clad in brick, with dressings in green and cream terracotta, and a slate roof. It has an irregular plan on a corner site, with five storeys and an attic, and a front of six bays with a canted corner on the left. The end and centre two bays contain three-storey oriel windows and are gabled, the bays between have gabled dormers. In the corner bay is an arched doorway in Baroque style with a dentilled canopy flanked by oculi with swags. At the top of the bay is an octagonal turret with a wooden bellcote and finial.	II
Lancaster House; 53.47536°N 2.23836°W		1905–1912	Originally a shipping and packing warehouse designed by Harry S. Fairhurst in Edwardian Baroque style, and later converted into apartments and offices. It has a steel frame clad with brown and buff terracotta and some brick, and it has slate roofs. The building has a long rectangular plan, and is in two parts. The left part has seven storeys, a basement and an attic with a three-sided corner turret surmounted by an octagonal four-stage Baroque spire. There are six bays on Whitworth Street, and four narrow bays on Princess Street. The right part has seven storeys and eight bays.	II*
Fourways House; 53.48142°N 2.23145°W		1906	A warehouse, later offices, in red brick on a plinth, with sandstone dressings and a Welsh slate roof. It has a rectangular plan with a central courtyard. There are six storeys and a basement, and the entrance front is symmetrical with eight bays. There are entrances in the second and seventh bays, and these bays rise above the parapet and contain a semicircular arch. On the ground floor are shop windows, and on the upper floors the windows are sashes with flat heads, apart from the top floor, where they have round arches.	II
India House and gateway 53.47508°N 2.23931°W		1906	Originally a packing warehouse designed by Harry S. Fairhurst in Edwardian Baroque style, and later converted into apartments, it has a steel frame clad with buff terracotta with dressings of brick and buff terracotta. The building has a rectangular plan, six storeys with a basement and attic, and a symmetrical front of 20 bays. It has a plinth, the lower two floors have channelled terracotta, above which is a cornice on brackets. The upper four floors have brick pilasters, a decorative frieze and a modillioned cornice. The central entrance has a semicircular arch and recessed doorways with Ionic semi-columns. To the left is an elaborate metal gateway with an overthrow and a lamp in Art Nouveau style.	II*
Manchester House; 53.47480°N 2.23781°W		1906–1909	A former warehouse with an iron frame, clad in brown sandstone and some buff brick, and on a plinth. It is in free Baroque style, and has six storeys with a basement and attic, and four bays plus a corner bay. The lower three floors have channelled rustication, and above are giant Ionic pilasters with festoons. Over these is a moulded frieze with a cartouche, a cornice with a segmental pediment, and a parapet. The main doorway has a segmental pediment and a cartouche. Most of the windows have moulded architraves.	II
50 Newton Street; 53.48186°N 2.23259°W		1907	Originally a hat maker's premises, later used for other purposes, it is in red brick and stone with buff terracotta dressings and a slate roof. It has four storeys, a basement, a full attic storey and a mansard attic. There are two bays on Newton Street, five on Hilton Street and three on Port Street. On Newton Street is a round-headed doorway with an architrave, columns and a segmental pediment, and on the rest of the ground floor are rectangular windows with keyed lintels. On the upper floors are three-storey arcades with quoined surrounds and keystones mainly containing windows; on Hilton Road are two two-storey oriel windows. In the attic on Newton Street is a pedimented dormer.	II
Clayton House; 53.48096°N 2.23461°W		1907	A shop with warehousing and offices, it has a façade in Portland stone, with brown terracotta on the ground floor, and a slate roof. There is a rectangular plan, six storeys and three bays. On the ground floor the outer bays have pedimented doorways, with modern shop fronts between. Above the fourth floor is a prominent cornice with egg-and-dart decoration, and at the top is a dentilled cornice broken by an upstand with a pediment. The central bays contain a three-storey canted oriel window. The windows are mullioned and transomed, and two have pediments and balconies.	II
Granby House; 53.47520°N 2.23586°W		1908	A warehouse, later flats, in red brick on a stone plinth, with dressings in Portland stone. There are six storeys with a basement and attic, and sides of eight bays. On the lower floors the windows have segmental heads and are recessed, and on the top two floors they have square heads. In the corner bays are canted oriel windows on the upper floors, lunettes, and Art Nouveau decoration, above which are gables. In the centre is a double entrance with a modillioned cornice and an entablature with swags.	II
Langley Buildings, Dale Street; 53.48066°N 2.23251°W		1908	A warehouse with a steel frame, clad in red brick and brown and red faience and with a slate mansard roof. It is in Baroque style, on an island site, and has two and three storeys, a basement and attic, a symmetrical front of three bays and sides of 19 bays. The lower floors are rusticated, above them is a moulded cornice, on the upper floors are giant Composite pilasters, a decorated top cornice, and a segmental pediment in the middle bay. Lower in the middle bay is a curved oriel window. The doorways are in the canted corners, with a three-sided oriel window above. The windows in the outer bays are different on each floor.	II
29–31 Dale Street; 53.48170°N 2.23366°W		1909	A warehouse, later used for other purposes, in red brick with limestone dressings, moulded cornices, and a slate mansard roof. It has four storeys, a basement and a two-storey attic, and a symmetrical front of seven bays, the bays divided by piers treated as pilasters. The central round-headed entrance has a two-storey arch, a round-headed doorway with a transomed semicircular window above, and an open pediment. The windows on the ground floor have segmental heads with keystones, the windows above are sashes, some with square heads, some with elliptical heads, and some are canted. In the attic are flat-roofed dormers, and in the centre is a gable with a Venetian window.	II
Canada House; 53.47554°N 2.24330°W		1909	A warehouse later used as offices, it has a steel frame, it is clad in buff glazed terracotta, and is in Art Nouveau style. The building is on an island site and has a trapezoidal plan, five storeys and double attics, and a ten-bay west front. Between the bays are piers rising to octagonal pinnacles with domed caps. Each bay has a giant segmental-headed arch below a modillioned cornice containing windows, most of which are cross-windows, and some are shallow canted oriel windows. On the fourth floor each bay contains a three-light window under a separate cornice. The main entrance is in the north front and has a Baroque-style arch with a lion-mask keystone.	II
Telephone Buildings; 53.47978°N 2.23876°W		c. 1909	Originally a telephone exchange, designed by Leonard Stokes, and later used for other purposes, it is in red brick with a granite basement, dressings in cream faience, banding in blue brick, and a lead roof. There are three storeys, a basement and an attic, and a front of five bays. In the centre is a segmental-headed entrance, and above it is a canted oriel window rising through the upper floors. The windows are square-headed with faience mullions, above the top floor is a cornice on consoles, and in the attic is a Diocletian window.	II
Electricity junction box, Tib Street; 53.48197°N 2.23821°W		Early 20th century	The electricity junction box is in cast iron, about 4 feet (1.2 m) tall and 12 inches (300 mm) square. It has a low embattled pyramidal cap on a moulded cornice. On the north and south sides are doors with a moulded surround and a relief design in the centre. On each of the west and east sides is a moulded surround and a plaque in low relief depicting the city crest.	II
Eleska House, Dale Street; 53.48070°N 2.23297°W		Early 20th century (probable)	A warehouse and offices in red brick on a sandstone plinth with sandstone dressings, bands, a cornice, and a parapet. It has a rectangular plan on a corner site, three storeys, a basement and an attic, three bays on the front, the first bay canted, five bays on the left return and a two-storey extension. In the corner is a round-headed doorway with imposts, a moulded head with a keystone, and a fanlight. The windows are sashes, some with hood moulds.	II
58 Richmond Street; 53.47676°N 2.23804°W		1911	A warehouse in reinforced concrete and rendered brick infill with a band, a cornice, and a parapet. It has three storeys with a basement, and four bays separated by pilasters.	II
Barclays Bank; 53.47990°N 2.23375°W		1911	Built for the Union Bank of Manchester and designed by Percy Worthington it is in Portland stone with a slate roof. It has a rectangular plan on a corner site, with four storeys and an attic, four bays on Piccadilly and eight on Chatham Street. The ground floor is rusticated, there are quoins, a band, an inscribed frieze, a modillioned cornice, and small pedimented dormers in the attic. The windows are sashes in moulded surrounds, and those on the first floor have pediments and balconies.	II
Bridgewater House; 53.47516°N 2.23997°W		1912	A warehouse, later offices, by Harry S. Fairhurst, the lower two storeys are in sandstone ashlar and above it is in white glazed terracotta. There are eight storeys with a basement and a symmetrical front of 19 bays. On the lower two floors are channelled rusticated piers, a moulded frieze and a prominent modillioned cornice. The upper floors contain canted oriel windows in alternate bays. In the centre at the top is a five-bay penthouse with a parapet and upstand. There are two square-headed doorways with medallions depicting the Duke of Bridgewater.	II
Former Grosvenor Picture Palace; 53.47012°N 2.23667°W		1912	The former cinema is clad in white and green faience tiles, and has Ionic pilasters, a frieze, a cornice, and a slate roof. It is on a corner site with two storeys and a small attic, six bays on Oxford Road, four on Grosvenor Street, and three chamfered bays on the corner. On the corner is an entrance with Ionic columns distyle in antis, above which are panels, lettered in the centre and with swagged roundels in the outer bays, and on the roof is a three-bay open pavilion with Ionic columns, a balustraded parapet, and a domed roof.	II
St James' Buildings; 53.47555°N 2.24163°W		1912	Commercial buildings with a steel frame, a façade of Portland stone on a granite plinth, and a mansard roof in green slate. It is in Baroque style, and has eight storeys plus dormers, and a front of 21 bays, the outer bays projecting. The lower floors are channelled, and contain round-headed openings with lunettes and triple keystones. The outer bays have balustraded balconies, and paired Ionic pilasters. The first floor contains windows with engaged columns, small balconies, and alternating triangular and segmental pediments. In the centre of the building is a large entrance, above which is a broken pediment and a square tower with a stepped spire.	II
Industry House; 53.48049°N 2.23227°W		1913	A former warehouse with an iron frame, clad in red brick, and faced on the front with buff faience. There are five storeys with a basement and attic, a front of five bays, plus three-bay corners, and five bays along the sides. The basement and ground floor have channelled piers and a lettered frieze. Above is a string course, a dentilled cornice, and a parapet with upstands on the corners. The windows are sashes with architraves. In the left corner is a round-headed doorway with a triple keystone, above which is an ornamental balcony and a three-storey oriel window and an oculus with festoons.	II
Orient House; 53.47503°N 2.23648°W		1914	A warehouse with a steel frame, a front of white glazed terracotta and sides of glass curtain walling. There are nine storeys with a basement, the façade having six storeys and an attic, and a symmetrical front of nine bays. The lower two floors have channelled rustication, and on the next three storeys the central seven bays have fluted Ionic columns between which are windows, and they are flanked by pilastered end bays. At the top is a prominent modillioned cornice. The doorways have shallow pediments with acroteria on consoles.	II
The Ritz; 53.47436°N 2.24290°W		1927	A dance hall in brick with a façade of white glazed terracotta on a plinth, with two storeys and nine bays, and a rusticated ground floor containing the entrance. Above it is a canopy, a pilastered upper floor, a cornice, and a stepped parapet. On the upper floor are rectangular windows, some blind, and above the central five windows are moulded ornaments.	II
Lee House; 53.47501°N 2.24309°W		1928–1931	A warehouse built as an extension to the Tootal, Broadhurst and Lee Building, it was designed by Harry S. Fairhurst and Henry Sellers, and later used as offices. The building has a steel frame clad in brown brick and with dressings in Portland stone. There are eight storeys and a basement, and a front of six bays. It has broad corner brick pilasters, and narrow chamfered piers between which are canted bay windows. The doors and loading bays are surrounded by Portland stone with Art Deco moulding.	II
Dancehouse; 53.47288°N 2.23989°W		1929–30	A group of buildings, including a former cinema, with a steel frame, brick at the rear and faience at the front. There are four storeys and nine bays, with a central entrance flanked by shops. On the first and second floors are giant pilasters with stylised Ionic capitals, and above is a cornice decorated with small arches, and a metal balustrade. Over the entrance is an arched portico with a volute keystone and a shaped pediment. Inside is Art Deco decoration.	II
Oxford Road railway station 53.47403°N 2.24210°W		1958–1960	The station has a laminated timber structure consisting of three conoid shells of diminishing sizes, with hardwood strip ceilings to the roofs and canopies. Under this are a booking office, a buffet, toilets and staff facilities built in concrete and timber. The canopies over the island platform buildings are supported by crucks and accessed by a footbridge.	II
Renold Building; 53.47490°N 2.23355°W		1960–1962	A purpose-built lecture block for UMIST. It has a reinforced concrete frame, clad in white concrete, with Portland stone slabs, and consists of a two-storey podium carrying a six-storey tower with a rectangular plan, and a projecting northwest stair tower. On the building is a large abstract mural by Victor Pasmore.	II
Sculptural wall 53.47541°N 2.23102°W		1968	The wall and sound buffer is in concrete, in Brutalist style, about 68 metres (223 ft) long and between 4.5 metres (15 ft) and 6 metres (20 ft) tall. It consists of concrete panels slotted into concrete columns, and contains a pair of timber gates.	II

== Notes and references ==
=== Sources ===
- Historic England, "Nos. 4, 6 and 8 Bradley Street, Manchester (1197808)", National Heritage List for England
- Historic England, "Nicklebys public house, Manchester (1209604)", National Heritage List for England
- Historic England, "Nos. 45, 47 and 47A Hilton Street, Manchester (1218704)", National Heritage List for England
- Historic England, "No. 47 Piccadilly, Manchester (1271231)", National Heritage List for England
- Historic England, "Nos. 74–78 and No. 80 and attached railings, Portland Street, Manchester (1246954)", National Heritage List for England
- Historic England, "Nos. 87–91 Princess Street, Manchester (1247390)", National Heritage List for England
- Historic England, "The Brunswick Hotel, Manchester (1271113)", National Heritage List for England
- Historic England, "Store Street Aqueduct, Manchester (1270666)", National Heritage List for England
- Historic England, "Nos. 69–77 Lever Street and No. 10 Bradley Street, Manchester (1291495)", National Heritage List for England
- Historic England, "Nos. 50–62 Port Street, Manchester (1271062)", National Heritage List for England
- Historic England, "Circus Tavern and attached railings, Manchester (1247057)", National Heritage List for England
- Historic England, "No. 39 Chorlton Street, Manchester (1283091)", National Heritage List for England
- Historic England, "Nos. 13 and 15 Paton Street, Manchester (1246661)", National Heritage List for England
- Historic England, "No. 9 Richmond Street, Manchester (1247476)", National Heritage List for England
- Historic England, "Rochdale Canal Lock No. 83, to east of Tariff Street, Manchester (1247479)", National Heritage List for England
- Historic England, "Rochdale Canal boundary wall to canal between Chorlton Street and Minshull Street, Manchester (1247478)", National Heritage List for England
- Historic England, "Rochdale Canal boundary wall to canal between Sackville Street and Chorlton Street, Manchester (1270837)", National Heritage List for England
- Historic England, "Boundary wall to Rochdale Canal between Princess Street and Sackville Street, Manchester (1247555)", National Heritage List for England
- Historic England, "Rochdale Canal towpath footbridge and associated ramps opposite Brownsfield Mill, Manchester (1270859)", National Heritage List for England
- Historic England, "Rochdale Canal Lock No. 84 (Dale Street Lock), Manchester (1247557)", National Heritage List for England
- Historic England, "Rochdale Canal Lock No. 85, in tunnel between Piccadilly and Dale Street, Manchester (1247480)", National Heritage List for England
- Historic England, "Rochdale Canal Lock No. 86, to east of Chorlton Street, Manchester (1247481)", National Heritage List for England
- Historic England, "Rochdale Canal Lock No. 87, to east of Princess Street, with cast-iron footbridge beside street, Manchester (1247580)", National Heritage List for England
- Historic England, "Rochdale Canal Lock No. 88 to east of Oxford Street, Manchester (1270857)", National Heritage List for England
- Historic England, "Rochdale Canal Lock No. 89 (Tib Lock), on south side of Havelock Mills, Manchester (1247596)", National Heritage List for England
- Historic England, "Rochdale Canal Lock No. 90, approximately 30 metres west of Albion Bridge, Manchester (1247482)", National Heritage List for England
- Historic England, "Dale Warehouse, Manchester (1200845)", National Heritage List for England
- Historic England, "Mill on north-east corner of junction with Chester Street, Manchester (1197776)", National Heritage List for England
- Historic England, "Chorlton New Mill and attached chimney, Manchester (1197774)", National Heritage List for England
- Historic England, "Chatham Mill, Manchester (1293040)", National Heritage List for England
- Historic England, "Peveril of the Peak public house, Manchester (1293058)", National Heritage List for England
- Historic England, "Entrance archway and lodge to yard of the Rochdale Canal Company, Manchester (1200846)", National Heritage List for England
- Historic England, "Marlsbro House, Manchester (1466846)", National Heritage List for England
- Historic England, "Brownsfield Mill, Manchester (1207994)", National Heritage List for England
- Historic England, "Nos. 94–98 Grosvenor Street, Manchester (1218404)", National Heritage List for England
- Historic England, "No. 8 Lever Street, Manchester (1219353)", National Heritage List for England
- Historic England, "No. 10 Lever Street, Manchester (1200802)", National Heritage List for England
- Historic England, "Nos. 12 and 14 Lever Street, Manchester (1219363)", National Heritage List for England
- Historic England, "The Churchill public house, Manchester (1197758)", National Heritage List for England
- Historic England, "New Union public house, Manchester (1247444)", National Heritage List for England
- Historic England, "Rochdale Canal Company office, Manchester (1200844)", National Heritage List for England
- Historic England, "The Briton's Protection public house, Manchester (1292050)", National Heritage List for England
- Historic England, "No. 19 Paton Street, Manchester (1271230)", National Heritage List for England
- Historic England, "Former junction works at Paradise Wharf, Manchester (1217852)", National Heritage List for England
- Historic England, "Stable block to south east of junction works at Paradise Wharf, Manchester (1200857)", National Heritage List for England
- Historic England, "Minshull House, Manchester (1283092)", National Heritage List for England
- Historic England, "Former Rochdale Canal Warehouse, Manchester (1254689)", National Heritage List for England
- Historic England, "The Athenaeum, Manchester (1270889)", National Heritage List for England
- Historic England, "Nos. 32 and 34 Laystall Street, Manchester (1282990)", National Heritage List for England
- Historic England, "Former cotton mill on west side of junction with Cambridge Street, Manchester (1282998)", National Heritage List for England
- Historic England, "Nos. 41 and 43 Faulkner Street, Manchester (1200829)", National Heritage List for England
- Historic England, "Nos. 39 and 41 George Street, Manchester (1218183)", National Heritage List for England
- Historic England, "Nos. 45 and 47 Faulkner Street, Manchester (1200830)", National Heritage List for England
- Historic England, "Nos. 35, 37 and 39A George Street, Manchester (1200836)", National Heritage List for England
- Historic England, "Manchester South Junction and Altrincham Railway Viaduct, Manchester (1200837)", National Heritage List for England
- Historic England, "No. 83 Princess Street, Manchester (1270913)", National Heritage List for England
- Historic England, "No. 49 Faulkner Street, Manchester (1200831)", National Heritage List for England
- Historic England, "Nos. 59 and 61 Faulkner Street, Manchester (1282964)", National Heritage List for England
- Historic England, "Bradley House, Manchester (1197772)", National Heritage List for England
- Historic England, "Nos. 44–50 Portland Street, Manchester (1247041)", National Heritage List for England
- Historic England, "Former goods offices to Piccadilly station, Manchester (1197919)", National Heritage List for England
- Historic England, "No. 68 Dale Street, Manchester (1282972)", National Heritage List for England
- Historic England, "Crusader Works, Manchester (1293172)", National Heritage List for England
- Historic England, "Lass O'Gowrie public house, Manchester (1293175)", National Heritage List for England
- Historic England, "Mill chimney stack on east side of junction with Cambridge Street, Manchester (1218746)", National Heritage List for England
- Historic England, "The Portland Thistle Hotel, Manchester (1246951)", National Heritage List for England
- Historic England, "Peel statue, Manchester (1271114)", National Heritage List for England
- Historic England, "Dalton statue, Manchester (1197791)", National Heritage List for England
- Historic England, "No. 103 Princess Street, Manchester (1247391)", National Heritage List for England
- Historic England, "Lindencort House, Manchester (1208396)", National Heritage List for England
- Historic England, "Britannia Hotel, Manchester (1246952)", National Heritage List for England
- Historic England, "Fraser House, Manchester (1283064)", National Heritage List for England
- Historic England, "Wellington statue, Manchester (1271115)", National Heritage List for England
- Historic England, "Austin House, Manchester (1197783)", National Heritage List for England
- Historic England, "Watt statue, Manchester (1246946)", National Heritage List for England
- Historic England, "Nos. 46, 48 and 50 Faulkner Street, Manchester (1282962)", National Heritage List for England
- Historic England, "No. 63 George Street, Manchester (1218197)", National Heritage List for England
- Historic England, "No. 61 Oxford Street, Manchester (1246286)", National Heritage List for England
- Historic England, "Nos. 127–133 Portland Street, Manchester (1246958)", National Heritage List for England
- Historic England, "Nos. 51 and 53 Richmond Street, Manchester (1270835)", National Heritage List for England
- Historic England, "Nos. 13–17 Albion Street, Manchester (1279694)", National Heritage List for England
- Historic England, "Nos. 25 and 27 Dale Street and 22 Lever Street, Manchester (1197771)", National Heritage List for England
- Historic England, "Nos. 8–12 Newton Street, Manchester (1271450)", National Heritage List for England
- Historic England, "Nos. 52 and 54 Portland Street, Manchester (1246953)", National Heritage List for England
- Historic England, "Nos. 109 and 111 Portland Street, Manchester (1271095)", National Heritage List for England
- Historic England, "Nos. 113–119 Portland Street, Manchester (1246957)", National Heritage List for England
- Historic England, "No. 46 Sackville Street, Manchester (1247608)", National Heritage List for England
- Historic England, "No. 32 Dickinson Street and Nos. 106 and 108 Portland Street, Manchester (1247060)", National Heritage List for England
- Historic England, "Nos. 72–76 Newton Street, Manchester (1271382)", National Heritage List for England
- Historic England, "Nos. 116 and 118 Portland Street, Manchester (1247062)", National Heritage List for England
- Historic England, "Nos. 42 and 44 Sackville Street, Manchester (1270791)", National Heritage List for England
- Historic England, "No. 109 Princess Street, Manchester (1270914)", National Heritage List for England
- Historic England, "Charlotte House, Manchester (1197782)", National Heritage List for England
- Historic England, "Dale Street Chambers, Manchester (1246279)", National Heritage List for England
- Historic England, "No. 11 Bloom Street, Manchester (1208005)", National Heritage List for England
- Historic England, "No. 45 Dale Street, Manchester (1283061)", National Heritage List for England
- Historic England, "Nos. 64 and 66 Dale Street, Manchester (1200843)", National Heritage List for England
- Historic England, "No. 57 Faulkner Street, Manchester (1218005)", National Heritage List for England
- Historic England, "No. 8 Minshull Street and No. 42 Bloom Street, Manchester (1219858)", National Heritage List for England
- Historic England, "Nos. 45 and 47 Newton Street, Manchester (1246268)", National Heritage List for England
- Historic England, "No. 49 Newton Street, 18 Hilton Street, 10 Stevenson Square, Manchester (1271452)", National Heritage List for England
- Historic England, "Gardens Hotel and shops, Manchester (1246920)", National Heritage List for England
- Historic England, "Minshull House, Manchester (1197926)", National Heritage List for England
- Historic England, "Mintierna House, Manchester (1197759)", National Heritage List for England
- Historic England, "Chorlton Old Mill, Manchester (1197775)", National Heritage List for England
- Historic England, "London Warehouse, Manchester (1217858)", National Heritage List for England
- Historic England, "Grand Hotel, Manchester (1197797)", National Heritage List for England
- Historic England, "City Police Courts, Manchester (1219894)", National Heritage List for England
- Historic England, "No. 56 Faulkner Street, Manchester (1200832)", National Heritage List for England
- Historic England, "No. 101 Princess Street, Manchester (1270899)", National Heritage List for England
- Historic England, "No. 3 Brazil Street, Manchester (1283077)", National Heritage List for England
- Historic England, "No. 55 Faulkner Street and No. 18 Nicholas Street, Manchester (1217991)", National Heritage List for England
- Historic England, "No. 17 George Street and No. 12 Charlotte Street, Manchester (1208392)", National Heritage List for England
- Historic England, "Former Pickles Building, Manchester (1246955)", National Heritage List for England
- Historic England, "No. 27 Sackville Street, Manchester (1247607)", National Heritage List for England
- Historic England, "Basil House, Manchester (1246956)", National Heritage List for England
- Historic England, "Brazil House, Manchester (1270871)", National Heritage List for England
- Historic England, "Halls Buildings, Manchester (1271112)", National Heritage List for England
- Historic England, "No. 16 Nicholas Street, Manchester (1271453)", National Heritage List for England
- Historic England, "Nos. 70 and 72 Portland Street and No. 20 Nicholas Street, Manchester (1271071)", National Heritage List for England
- Historic England, "Chepstow House, Manchester (1283067)", National Heritage List for England
- Historic England, "No. 56 Dale Street, Manchester (1209799)", National Heritage List for England
- Historic England, "Nos. 32 and 34 Dale Street, 17–25 Newton Street, Manchester (1246267)", National Heritage List for England
- Historic England, "No. 36 Dale Street and 14 and 16 Newton Street, Manchester (1246266)", National Heritage List for England
- Historic England, "No. 47 Dale Street, Manchester (1209675)", National Heritage List for England
- Historic England, "No. 2 Harter Street, Manchester (1200841)", National Heritage List for England
- Historic England, "No. 12 Harter Street and No. 104 Bloom Street, Manchester (1218476)", National Heritage List for England
- Historic England, "Kingsley House, Manchester (1271451)", National Heritage List for England
- Historic England, "Nos. 52 and 54 Faulkner Street, Manchester (1282963)", National Heritage List for England
- Historic England, "Nos. 77–83 Piccadilly, Manchester (1271232)", National Heritage List for England
- Historic England, "Star and Garter public house, Manchester (1200827)", National Heritage List for England
- Historic England, "Princess Buildings, Manchester (1247380)", National Heritage List for England
- Historic England, "Adult Deaf and Dumb Institute (former), Manchester (1200839)", National Heritage List for England
- Historic England, "No. 1 Piccadilly, Manchester (1246874)", National Heritage List for England
- Historic England, "Former Newton Street Police Station, Manchester (1246269)", National Heritage List for England
- Historic England, "Nos. 110–114 Portland Street, Manchester (1247061)", National Heritage List for England
- Historic England, "No. 36 Princess Street, Manchester (1247384)", National Heritage List for England
- Historic England, "Central House, Manchester (1247389)", National Heritage List for England
- Historic England, "Langley Buildings, Manchester (1247385)", National Heritage List for England
- Historic England, "Lionesse House, Manchester (1247387)", National Heritage List for England
- Historic England, "Regency House, Manchester (1254835)", National Heritage List for England
- Historic England, "Rhodesia House, Manchester (1270911)", National Heritage List for England
- Historic England, "Transact House, Manchester (1247386)", National Heritage List for England
- Historic England, "Nos. 15 and 17 Piccadilly and 1–11 Oldham Street, Manchester (1271118)", National Heritage List for England
- Historic England, "Train shed and undercroft at Piccadilly Station, Manchester (1283014)", National Heritage List for England
- Historic England, "Nos. 26–30 Princess Street, Manchester (1246961)", National Heritage List for England
- Historic England, "No. 34 Princess Street, Manchester (1247383)", National Heritage List for England
- Historic England, "Eastern House Portland House, Manchester (1247058)", National Heritage List for England
- Historic England, "St Margarets Chambers, Manchester (1246265)", National Heritage List for England
- Historic England, "The Palace Theatre, Manchester (1271227)", National Heritage List for England
- Historic England, "Former Refuge Assurance Company offices, Manchester (1271429)", National Heritage List for England
- Historic England, "No. 49 Piccadilly, Manchester (1246670)", National Heritage List for England
- Historic England, "Institute of Science and Technology (University of Manchester), Manchester (1247609)", National Heritage List for England
- Historic England, "Tootal, Broadhurst & Lee Building, Manchester (1271294)", National Heritage List for England
- Historic England, "The Sheena Simon 6th Form College, Manchester (1270607)", National Heritage List for England
- Historic England, "Watts Brothers, Manchester (1200803)", National Heritage List for England
- Historic England, "No. 107 Piccadilly, Manchester (1246944)", National Heritage List for England
- Historic England, "Former Horrocks, Crewdson and Company Warehouse, Manchester (1200801)", National Heritage List for England
- Historic England, "No. 22 Dale Street, Manchester (1283060)", National Heritage List for England
- Historic England, "No. 49 and 51 Dale Street and Nos. 30 and 32 Hilton Street, Manchester (1292485)", National Heritage List for England
- Historic England, "No. 3 Dale Street, Manchester (1209576)", National Heritage List for England
- Historic England, "Asia House, Manchester (1247432)", National Heritage List for England
- Historic England, "Oddfellows Hall, Manchester (1200840)", National Heritage List for England
- Historic England, "Former Electricity Power Station, Manchester (1255031)", National Heritage List for England
- Historic England, "Queen Victoria Monument, Manchester (1246945)", National Heritage List for England
- Historic England, "Police and Fire Station, Manchester (1197918)", National Heritage List for England
- Historic England, "No. 35 Dale Street, Manchester (1209673)", National Heritage List for England
- Historic England, "Sevendale House, Manchester (1200847)", National Heritage List for England
- Historic England, "Joshua Hoyle Building, including Roby House, Manchester (1271127)", National Heritage List for England
- Historic England, "Lancaster House, Manchester (1254887)", National Heritage List for England
- Historic England, "Fourways House, Manchester (1380335)", National Heritage List for England
- Historic England, "India House (including attached wrought-iron gateway linked to Lancaster House), Manchester (1254836)", National Heritage List for England
- Historic England, "Manchester House, Manchester (1270897)", National Heritage List for England
- Historic England, "Clayton House, Manchester (1246671)", National Heritage List for England
- Historic England, "Newton Buildings, Manchester (1246388)", National Heritage List for England
- Historic England, "Granby House, Manchester (1218253)", National Heritage List for England
- Historic England, "Langley House, Manchester (1197773)", National Heritage List for England
- Historic England, "Nos. 29 and 31 Dale Street, Manchester (1209666)", National Heritage List for England
- Historic England, "Canada House, Manchester (1208597)", National Heritage List for England
- Historic England, "Telephone Buildings, Manchester (1255051)", National Heritage List for England
- Historic England, "Electricity junction box, Tib Street, Manchester (1485437)", National Heritage List for England
- Historic England, "Eleska House, Manchester (1200842)", National Heritage List for England
- Historic England, "Former warehouse, Manchester (1431770)", National Heritage List for England
- Historic England, "Barclays Bank, Manchester (1246668)", National Heritage List for England
- Historic England, "Bridgewater House, Manchester (1270606)", National Heritage List for England
- Historic England, "Former Grosvenor Picture Palace, Manchester (1218431)", National Heritage List for England
- Historic England, "St James Buildings, Manchester (1246571)", National Heritage List for England
- Historic England, "Industry House, Manchester (1282971)", National Heritage List for England
- Historic England, "Orient House, Manchester (1200838)", National Heritage List for England
- Historic England, "The Ritz Dance Hall, Manchester (1254888)", National Heritage List for England
- Historic England, "Lee House, Manchester (1218358)", National Heritage List for England
- Historic England, "Dancehouse Theatre, including Nos. 6–14a Oxford Road, Manchester (1384997)", National Heritage List for England
- Historic England, "Manchester Oxford Road station (including platform structures), Manchester (1255053)", National Heritage List for England
- Historic England, "Renold Building, UMIST Campus, Manchester (1491623)", National Heritage List for England
- Historic England, "Sculptural wall, Manchester (1400857)", National Heritage List for England
- Historic England, Listed Buildings
- Hartwell, Clare; Hyde, Matthew; Pevsner, Nikolaus (2004), Lancashire: Manchester and the South-East, The Buildings of England, New Haven and London: Yale University Press, ISBN 0-300-10583-5
