= Chorlton New Mills =

Listed former mill in Manchester, England

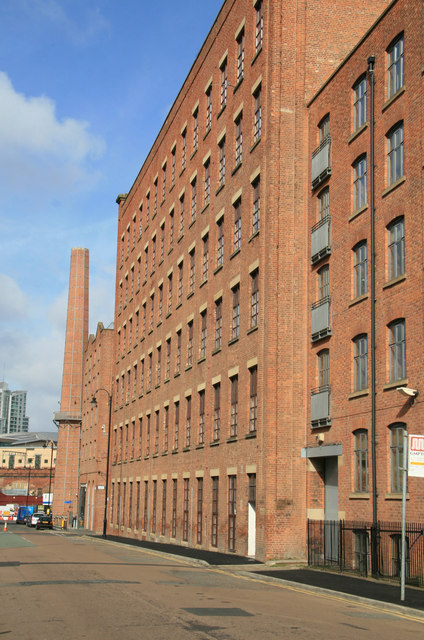
- Chorlton New Mill with Chorlton Old Mill to right

General information
- Address: Cambridge Street, Chorlton-on-Medlock, Manchester, England
- Coordinates: 53.473°N 2.246°W
- Year(s) built: 1814 (chimney 1853)
- Renovated: Extended in 1818 and 1845

Technical details
- Material: Red brick, slate
- Designations

Listed Building – Grade II
- Official name: Chorlton New Mill and Attached Chimney
- Designated: 11 March 1988
- Reference no.: 1197774

Chorlton New Mills is a former large cotton spinning complex in Cambridge Street, Chorlton-on-Medlock, Manchester, England, which has since been converted to apartments.

The complex was initially established in 1814 by members of the Birley family. The original block was an 8-storey building, including two storeys below ground level, of 20 bays and is the oldest surviving fireproof mill in Greater Manchester. It was powered by a 100 hp Boulton and Watt beam engine and illuminated by gas produced in the basement, where it was stored in three gasholders. It stands adjacent to Chorlton Old Mill, rebuilt in 1866 on the site of Robert Owen's 1795 Chorlton Twist Mill.

An extra wing was added to the new mill in 1818, originally powered from the main building but later provided with its own external engine house. In 1829 a 600 loom weaving shed was added, which has since been demolished. In 1845 the two existing spinning blocks were connected by the building of a third 6-bay fireproof block with an internal engine house. The basements of the complex were connected to those of nearby mills by a system of tunnels.

In 1860 the site was taken over by Charles Macintosh and used, together with other nearby mills, for the production of rubberised fabric. It has since been converted to living accommodation.

Together with its metal-bound chimney, built in 1853, it is a Grade II listed building.

== See also ==
- Listed buildings in Manchester-M1
- Hugh Birley
- Hugh Hornby Birley
