= 49 Piccadilly =

Listed building in Manchester, England

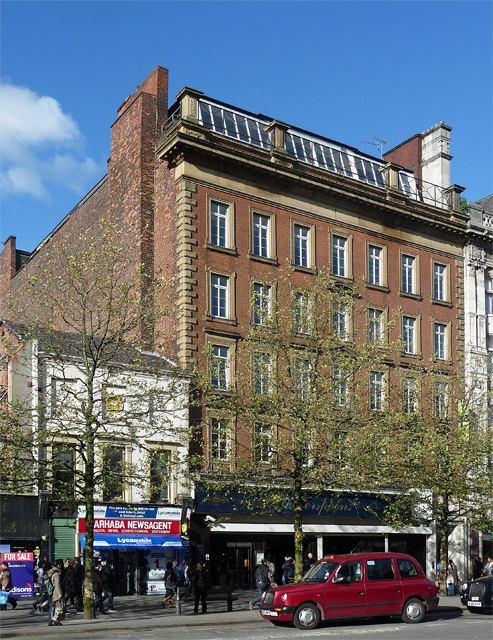
- The building in 2012
- Alternative names: Piccadilly House

General information
- Type: Offices and public house
- Architectural style: Italianate
- Location: Piccadilly, Manchester, England
- Coordinates: 53.4811°N 2.2351°W
- Year built: 1846–1847; 179 years ago
- Renovated: 1850 (rebuilt) c. 1886–1917 (added)

Design and construction
- Designations

Listed Building – Grade II
- Official name: 49 Piccadilly
- Designated: 6 June 1994
- Reference no.: 1246670

Other information
- Public transit: Manchester Piccadilly

Website
- 49piccadilly.com Wetherspoons website

49 Piccadilly (also known as Piccadilly House) is a Grade II listed commercial building on Piccadilly in Manchester, England. Built in 1846–47 for a textile firm, it later served as a clothiers' warehouse and a bank, and is now used as offices, with the ground floor occupied by a public house called Wetherspoons, operated by J. D. Wetherspoon.

== History ==
The building was originally constructed in 1846–47 for the textile firm J. P. and E. Westhead. It was rebuilt after a fire in 1850 and later given a mansard roof between 1886 and 1917.

From 1892 the ground floor was occupied by the Manchester & County Bank, which established a branch on the Piccadilly frontage. The bank remained in the building until 1931, during which time it commissioned Mills & Murgatroyd to carry out alterations in 1928, likely updating the ground‑floor banking accommodation.

By 1917 the premises were occupied by Chorlton Brothers, clothiers, continuing its long association with the textile trade. In the later 20th century the ground floor was adapted for use as a public house, and a J. D. Wetherspoon pub subsequently opened in the building, where it remains in operation.

On 6 June 1994, the building was designated a Grade II listed structure. It forms part of a continuous historic frontage on the north side of Piccadilly, directly overlooking Piccadilly Gardens, and contributes to a group of listed former warehouses and commercial buildings extending along the street. The building is also known as Piccadilly House in its modern commercial use, a name commonly applied to the serviced offices.

== Architecture ==
The building is constructed of red brick with sandstone elements and has a slate roof. It is a long, deep rectangle in a simplified Italianate style. It rises five full floors with an attic above, and its front is arranged around seven evenly spaced windows. The design is balanced, with textured corner details, a plain band beneath the roofline, a decorative cornice, and a brick parapet broken up by stone features and chimneys. A large dormer sits in the attic.

Most of the ground floor has been changed over time, apart from a square doorway on the right that keeps its original decorative frame. The upper floors have a regular pattern of windows, all the same height, each set in moulded surrounds. On the first and second floors, the windows have "shouldered" frames; those on the lower of these two levels also have decorative panels and pediments, including a swan‑neck pediment in the centre. On the floor above, the windows have cornices, except for the central one, which has a pediment instead. The third‑floor windows have "eared" frames, with the middle one topped by an open, curved pediment. The glazing on the first floor has been replaced, while the upper floors use eight‑pane casement windows.

A wide, fully glazed dormer stretches across the roof slope, topped with a hipped roof divided into three sections.

== See also ==
- Listed buildings in Manchester-M1
- Listed pubs in Greater Manchester
