= 50 Newton Street =

Warehouse in Manchester, England

Coordinates: 53.4819°N 2.2327°W

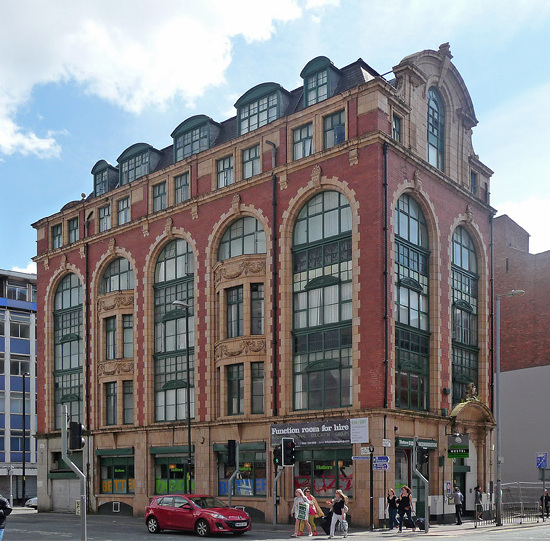
- 50 Newton Street
- Interactive map of the 50 Newton Street area

General information
- Architectural style: "Free Baroque"
- Location: Manchester, M1 2EA
- Year built: 1906–08
- Owner: Sean Boyd

Technical details
- Floor count: 6

Design and construction
- Architects: Charles Clegg & Son
- Designations

Listed Building – Grade II
- Official name: Newton Buildings
- Designated: 19 June 1988
- Reference no.: 1246388

50 Newton Street is a Grade II listed former warehouse in Manchester, England. It is located on Newton Street in the Northern Quarter area of the city.

It was built in 1906–08 by a design from Charles Clegg & Son and was designed with a degree of flair and panache and is described by English Heritage as an example of "Free Baroque" architecture. The hat factory it replaced was destroyed by fire in 1906.

As of 2024, the building is planned to be fully renovated by Sean Boyd of Boyd & Co. Capital Investments Limited.

== See also ==
- Listed buildings in Manchester-M1
