= The Churchill, Manchester =

Listed pub in England

The Churchill
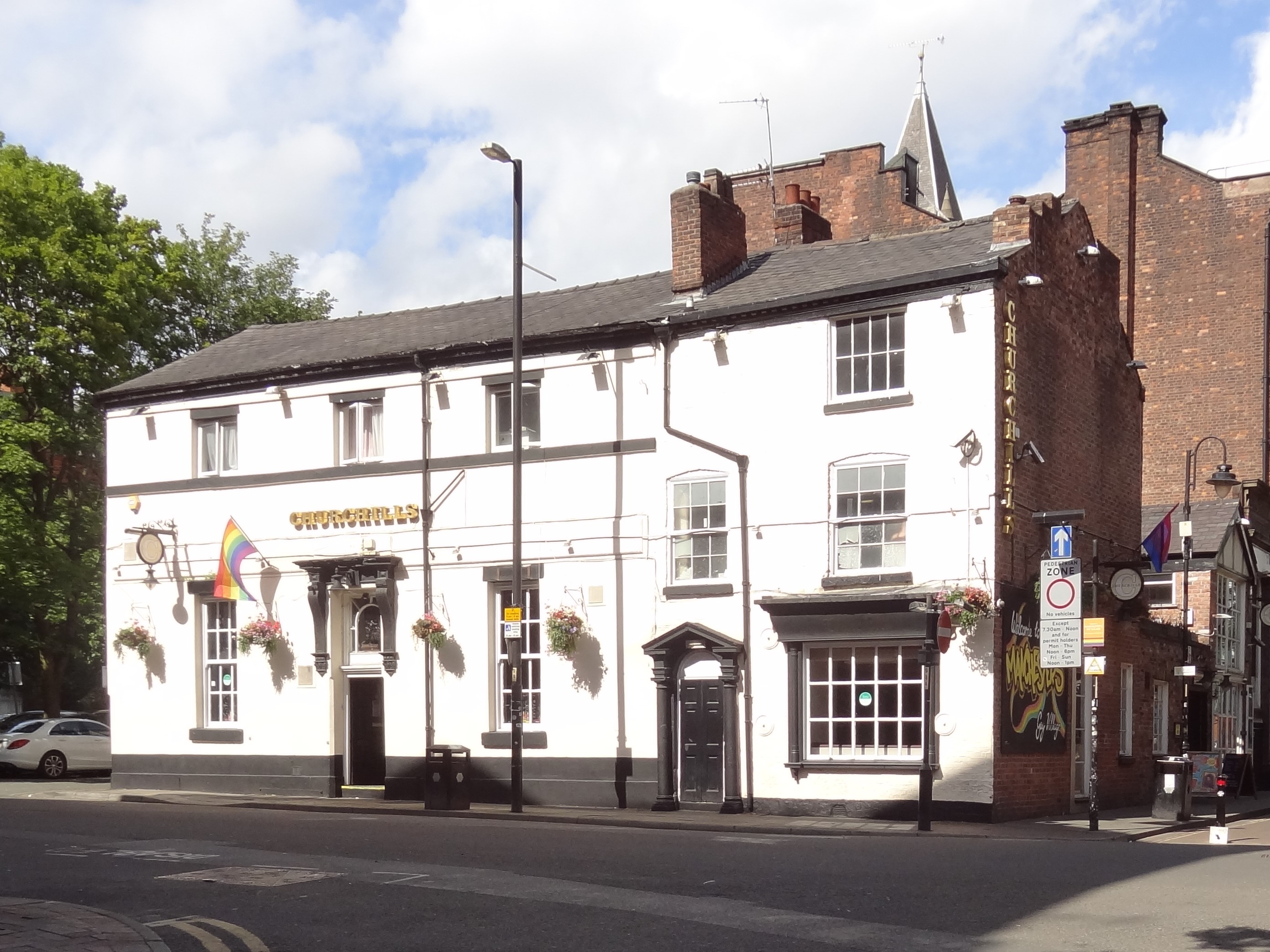
- The pub in 2018
- Former names: Mechanics Arms, Churchills
- Alternative names: The Church

General information
- Type: Public house
- Location: 37 Chorlton Street, Manchester, England
- Coordinates: 53.4778°N 2.2361°W
- Year built: Early 19th century

Design and construction
- Designations

Listed Building – Grade II
- Official name: The Churchill public house
- Designated: 6 June 1994
- Reference no.: 1197758

Other information
- Public transit: Manchester Piccadilly

Website
- thechurchmcr.co.uk

The Churchill (formerly known as the Mechanics Arms and Churchills, and now trading as The Church), is a Grade II listed public house on Chorlton Street, adjacent to Canal Street, in Manchester, England, within the city's gay village. It is one of the area's oldest venues, having operated as a pub since the 1850s and later functioning as a hotel, drag and karaoke venue.

== History ==
The building originated in the early 19th century, according to its official listing. It was recorded as the Mechanics Arms public house by the mid‑19th century, appearing under that name on maps from 1851. By the 1870s it was operated by William Darnward, and the pub subsequently passed through several licensees, including Frederick L. Burgess in the 1890s and Annie Sheerin in the early 20th century.

Archive photographs show that the pub retained the name Mechanics Arms until at least 1973. The venue adopted the name Churchills at some point in the later 20th century and became a long‑established fixture of Manchester's gay village. The Manchester Evening News describes it as one of the area's oldest venues, noting its operation as a pub since the 1850s and its later use as a hotel, drag and karaoke venue.

On 6 June 1994, the pub was designated a Grade II listed building. It continues to function as a venue within the gay village.

== Architecture ==
The building is constructed from brick with stucco dressings and has a slate roof. It originally had three storeys but is now two. It occupies a corner plot at Chorlton Street, Canal Street and Richmond Street.

== See also ==
- Listed buildings in Manchester-M1
- Listed pubs in Manchester
