= New Union, Manchester =

Listed pub and hotel in England

New Union
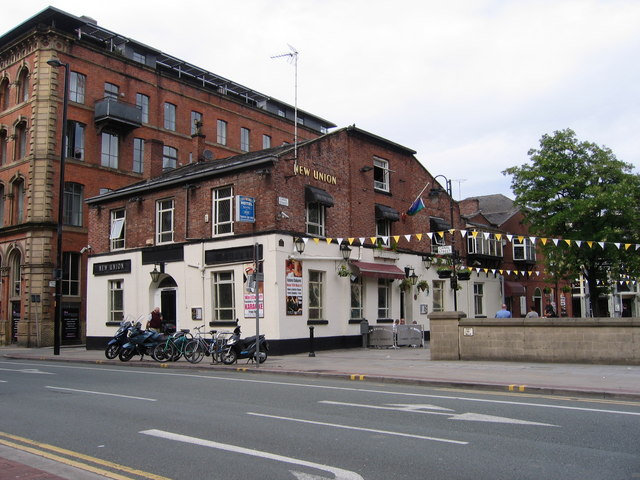
- The pub and hotel in 2009
- Former names: Union Hotel

General information
- Type: Public house and hotel
- Location: 111 Princess Street, Manchester, England
- Coordinates: 53.4763°N 2.2385°W
- Year built: Early 19th century
- Renovated: Mid-1990s (extended)

Design and construction
- Designations

Listed Building – Grade II
- Official name: New Union public house
- Designated: 3 October 1974
- Reference no.: 1247444

Other information
- Public transit: Manchester Piccadilly

Website
- newunionhotel.co.uk

The New Union (formerly known as the Union Hotel) is a Grade II listed public house and hotel on Princess Street, adjacent to Canal Street, in Manchester, England, within the city's gay village. Established in the 1860s, it is one of the area's longest‑standing venues and operates as a drag and karaoke venue as well as a hotel.

== History ==
The building originated in the early 19th century, according to its official listing. It was established as the Union Hotel around 1860, a name reportedly deriving from an anecdotal reference to the union of territories within what was then the British Empire.

The pub has served a largely gay customer base since the Second World War and is regarded as one of the oldest LGBTQ venues in the country. It was given its present name in the 1970s.

On 3 October 1974, the pub was designated a Grade II listed building. The New Union was extended in the mid-1990s, and it continues to function as a venue within the gay village.

== Architecture ==
The building is constructed from red brick with stucco dressings on the ground floor and has a slate roof. It has two storeys, three bays, and an extension to the rear. The doorway on the front façade has a segmental head, and the windows are altered casements.

The interior contains stained‑glass windows depicting Commonwealth nations, including Australia, Canada, India, and New Zealand.

== See also ==
- Listed buildings in Manchester-M1
- Listed pubs in Manchester
