= List of warehouses in Manchester =

Manchester district shown within Greater Manchester

The development of Manchester, England, during the Industrial Revolution produced a large concentration of warehouses, and this list of warehouses in Manchester documents the surviving examples. The city became closely associated with its industrial landscape, with canals, railway viaducts, cotton mills and warehouses supporting the movement and storage of goods. Large numbers of warehouses were built from before the Victorian era (1837–1901) to the end of the Edwardian era (1910).

The city developed six main warehouse types: display, overseas, packing, shipping, railway, and canal warehouses. In 1806 there were just over 1,000 warehouses, rising to 1,819 by 1815, leading to the nickname "warehouse city". Early examples were concentrated around King Street, spreading to Portland Street by the mid‑19th century and later to Whitworth Street. These buildings evolved from the earlier canal warehouses of Castlefield.

Grade	Criteria
I	Buildings of exceptional interest.
II*	Particularly important buildings of more than special interest.
II	Buildings of special interest.

== Warehouses ==
Warehouses in Manchester
Name	Image	Location	Completed	Date designated	Grade	Entry number	Notes	Refs.
Dale Street Warehouse		Dale Street, Northern Quarter	1806	10 November 1972	II*	1200845	Canal warehouse, including subterranean water-wheel. Built in 1806 by William Crossley. Recognised as the earliest canal warehouse in Manchester.	
1830 warehouse, Liverpool Road railway station		Liverpool Road, Castlefield	1830	8 May 1973	I	1282991	Recognised as the world's first railway warehouse. The designer is unknown, though it has been attributed to Thomas Haigh and to George and Robert Stephenson.	
Jackson's Warehouse		Tariff Street, Northern Quarter	1836	3 October 1974	II*	1254689	One of the earliest examples of 'shipping holes', which allow boats to unpack goods under the building. Renovated in 2003, now apartments and commercial space.	
Victoria and Albert Warehouses		Water Street	c. 1838	3 October 1974	II	1254727	Warehouses for Mersey and Irwell Navigation Company, now a hotel.	
Watts Warehouse		35–47 Portland Street	1856	25 February 1952	II*	1246952	Distinguished by its unusually eclectic design. It has five storeys, each treated in a different architectural manner—Italian Renaissance, Elizabethan, French Renaissance and Flemish—and roof pavilions that include large Gothic wheel windows. Now a hotel.	
Charlotte House		44–48 George Street	1857	3 October 1974	II	1197782	Cotton merchants' warehouse by Edward Walters. Sandstone ashlar and light red brick exterior. Italian palazzo style.	
Austin House		14 and 16 Charlotte Street	1860	3 October 1974	II	1197783	Textile merchants' warehouses; now offices. Designed by Edward Walters in an Italian palazzo style. Altered since opening; now offices.	
Behrens Building		127–133 Portland Street	1860	3 October 1974	II	1246958	Various shipping warehouses, built by P. Nunn for Louis Behrens and Sons. Red brick and sandstone exterior. Strong horizontal emphasis which fronts onto Portland Street.	
63 George Street		George Street and Dickinson Street	c. 1860	3 October 1974	II	1218197	Merchant's warehouse in an Italian palazzo style. Now offices and restaurant.	
Lancashire House		9 Southmill Street	c. 1860–1870	3 October 1974	II	1246665	Probably merchant's warehouse. Sandstone ashlar exterior at ground floor, red brick with sandstone dressings above.	
109 and 111 Portland Street		Portland Street	c. 1860–1870	6 June 1994	II	1271095	Various warehouses, now partly bar and nightclub. Red brick exterior in Flemish bond, with sandstone dressings and slate roof. A mixed eclectic style.	
13–17 Albion Street		Albion Street	c. 1860–1870	3 October 1974	II	1279694	Red brick exterior with sandstone dressings and a slate roof. Designed in a Venetian Gothic style.	
Princess Buildings		72–76 George Street and 18–24 Princess Street	c. 1860–1880	3 October 1974	II	1247380	Textile warehouses and offices, now used as offices. Likely built with an iron frame, clad in sandstone ashlar with a slate roof.	
7 Southmill Street, 1–5 Central Street		Southmill Street and Central Street	Mid to late 19th century	3 October 1974	II	1293203	Probably built as a warehouse, later used as a Post Office and now in office use. Red brick in Flemish bond with sandstone detailing; the roof is hidden from view.	
London Warehouse (Ducie Street Warehouse)		10 Ducie Street	1867	3 October 1974	II	1217858	Railway warehouse for Manchester, Sheffield and Lincolnshire Railway near the basin of the Ashton Canal. Originally four similar buildings were built, but only one remains.	
Harvester House		37 Peter Street	1868	30 April 1982	II	1246664	Described as "probably [a] merchant's warehouse" by Historic England. Designed by Clegg and Knowles; has altered. Sandstone ashlar exterior and slate roof.	
101 Princess Street		Princess Street	1869	3 October 1974	II	1270899	Shipping warehouse by Clegg and Knowles in a Palazzo style. Red brick exterior in Flemish bond, with sandstone dressings (roof not visible from street). Parallelogram plan on island site with a rear loading bay. Later converted to offices and a nightclub.	
12 Charlotte Street, 17 George Street		Charlotte Street and George Street	c. 1870 (probable)	3 October 1974	II	1208392	Built as a home trade warehouse. Extension of the Austin House warehouse building. Basement and five-storeys, sandstone ashlar exterior. Narrow plan on corner site. Now offices.	
Brazil House		105 and 107 Princess Street	c. 1870–1880	3 October 1974	II	1270871	Pair of shipping warehouses; now offices. Described as "Eclectic style, with some Gothic features" by Historic England.	
Basil House		105 and 107 Portland Street	c. 1870–1880	6 June 1994	II	1246956	Trade warehouse. Probably iron-framed, with exterior of red brick, sandstone dressings and slate roof. Designed in an eclectic style. Forms group with No. 103 to left, and with Nos. 109 and 111, and 113 to 119 to right, together comprising a complete block of former warehouses.	
Chepstow House		16–20 Chepstow Street	1874	28 June 1974	II	1283067	Originally shipping warehouse by Speakman, Son and Hickson, for textile merchant Sam Mendel. Red brick with sandstone dressings exterior.	
Bradley House		Dale Street, Northern Quarter	Late 19th century	6 June 1994	II	1197772	Shipping warehouse, probably for Kessler & Co., a machine manufacturing company. One of the very few plainly decorated warehouses in Victorian Manchester, noted for its simple Georgian style.	
Central House		74 Princess Street	1880	3 October 1974	II	1247389	Shipping warehouse by Corson and Aitken. Red brick with red sandstone dressings, steeply pitched slate roof with obelisk finials. Described as "Scottish baronial" style by Historic England.	
110–114 Portland Street		Portland Street	1880	28 February 1989	II	1247061	Warehousing, probably textiles or clothing. Designed by Charles Henry Heathcote in an Romanesque style. Irregular trapeziform plan with sandstone ashlar and red brick exterior	
Great Northern Warehouse		Watson Street	1885–1896, 1899	4 May 1979	II*	1268529	Built by Great Northern Railway. A unique survival of a 3-way railway goods exchange station, serving the railway, canal and road networks of the Manchester region. Built to be fully fire proof, it was considered in its day to be one of the most advanced railway goods exchanges in the country.	
49 Spring Gardens		Spring Gardens	1888–1891	3 October 1974	II	1270700	Commercial building, probably a textiles warehouse, by Alfred Waterhouse. Sandstone ashlar exterior and mansard slate roof. Rectangular plan on end-of-block site, with curved corners, and loading bay to rear. Eclectic style, with some Gothic motifs.	
Tootal, Broadhurst and Lee Building		56 Oxford Street	1896–1898	3 October 1974	II*	1271294	Formerly home to Tootal, Broadhurst and Lee Co., a cotton manufacturing company. As of 2026, the building hosts the headquarters of the Greater Manchester Combined Authority, including the office of the Mayor of Greater Manchester.	
107 Piccadilly		Piccadilly	1899	3 October 1974	II	1246944	Cotton manufacturers' showroom and warehouse, now hotel and restaurant. Designed by Charles Henry Heathcote, possibly for Horrocks Crewdson & Co or Sparrow Hardwick & Company.	
Asia House		82 Princess Street	c. 1900–1910	3 October 1974	II*	1247432	Packing and shipping warehouses in an Edwardian Baroque style by Harry S. Fairhurst. Interior described as "unusually elaborate" and "probably the best example of its kind in any Manchester warehouse" with Art Nouveau and Venetian Gothic motifs. Now used as offices.	
Princes Buildings		18, 20, 24–28 Oxford Road	1903	4 April 1974	II	1246285	Designed by I. R. E. Birkett in an Art Nouveau style. Now offices and retail units.	
Sevendale House		Dale Street	1903	6 June 1994	II	1200847	Large former general warehouse, now mainly used by wholesalers. Built for I. J. & C. Cooper Ltd. Steel‑framed with concrete floors, clad in polished red granite, red sandstone and deep red brick and terracotta, with a green slate roof.	
Lancaster House		67–71 Whitworth Street	1906	3 October 1974	II*	1254887	Shipping and packing warehouses in an Edwardian Baroque style by Harry S. Fairhurst. Since been converted into residential flats and separated into two buildings.	
Canada House		3 Chepstow Street	1909	20 June 1988	II	1208597	Packing warehouse by William G. Higginbottom in Art Nouveau style. Five storeys with basement and double attic. Cast-iron frame with steel truss roof.	
Bridgewater House		58 and 60 Whitworth Street	1912	6 June 1994	II	1270606	Shipping warehouse designed by Harry S. Fairhurst. Steel‑framed, clad in sandstone ashlar and white glazed terracotta; the roof is not visible. Now in office use.	

== See also ==
- Architecture of Manchester
- Cottonopolis
- Grade I listed buildings in Manchester
- Grade II* listed buildings in Manchester
- Grade II listed buildings in Manchester
- Manchester cotton warehouses
