= Cottonopolis =

19th-century nickname for Manchester, England

Coordinates: 53°28′45″N 2°14′41″W

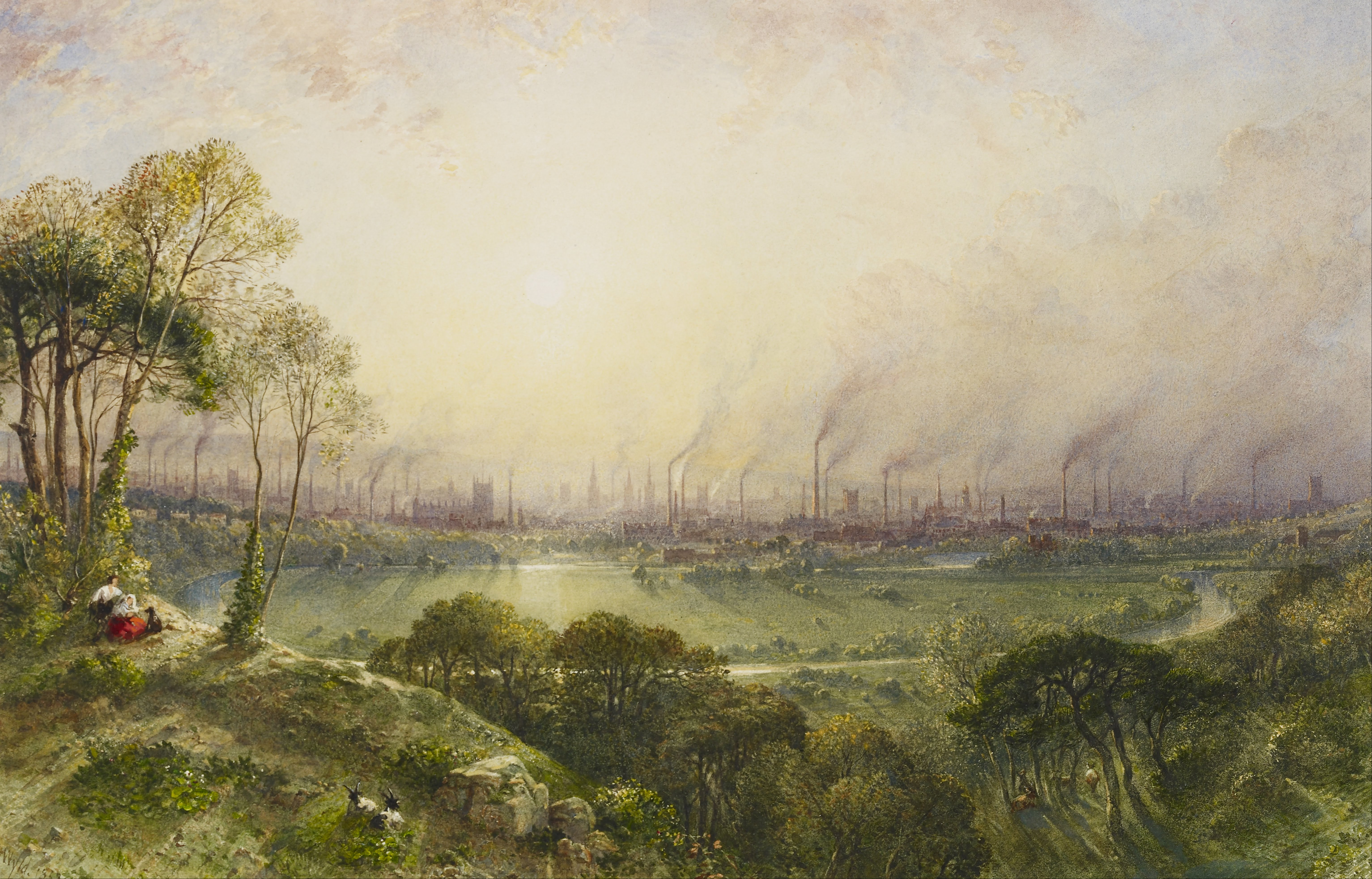
Manchester from Kersal Moor, by William Wyld in 1852. Manchester acquired the nickname "Cottonopolis" during the early 19th century owing to its many textile factories.

Cottonopolis was a 19th-century nickname for Manchester, as it was a metropolis and the centre of the cotton industry.

The Manchester warehouse which we lately visited, was a building fit for the Town Hall of any respectable municipality; a stately, spacious, and tasteful edifice; rich and substantial as its respectable proprietors, the well-known firm of Banneret and Co. There are nearly a hundred such buildings in Manchester; –not so large, perhaps, for this is the largest; but all in their degree worthy of Cottonopolis.

— Lowe J, "A Manchester warehouse", Household Words 9: 269 (1854)

== Background ==
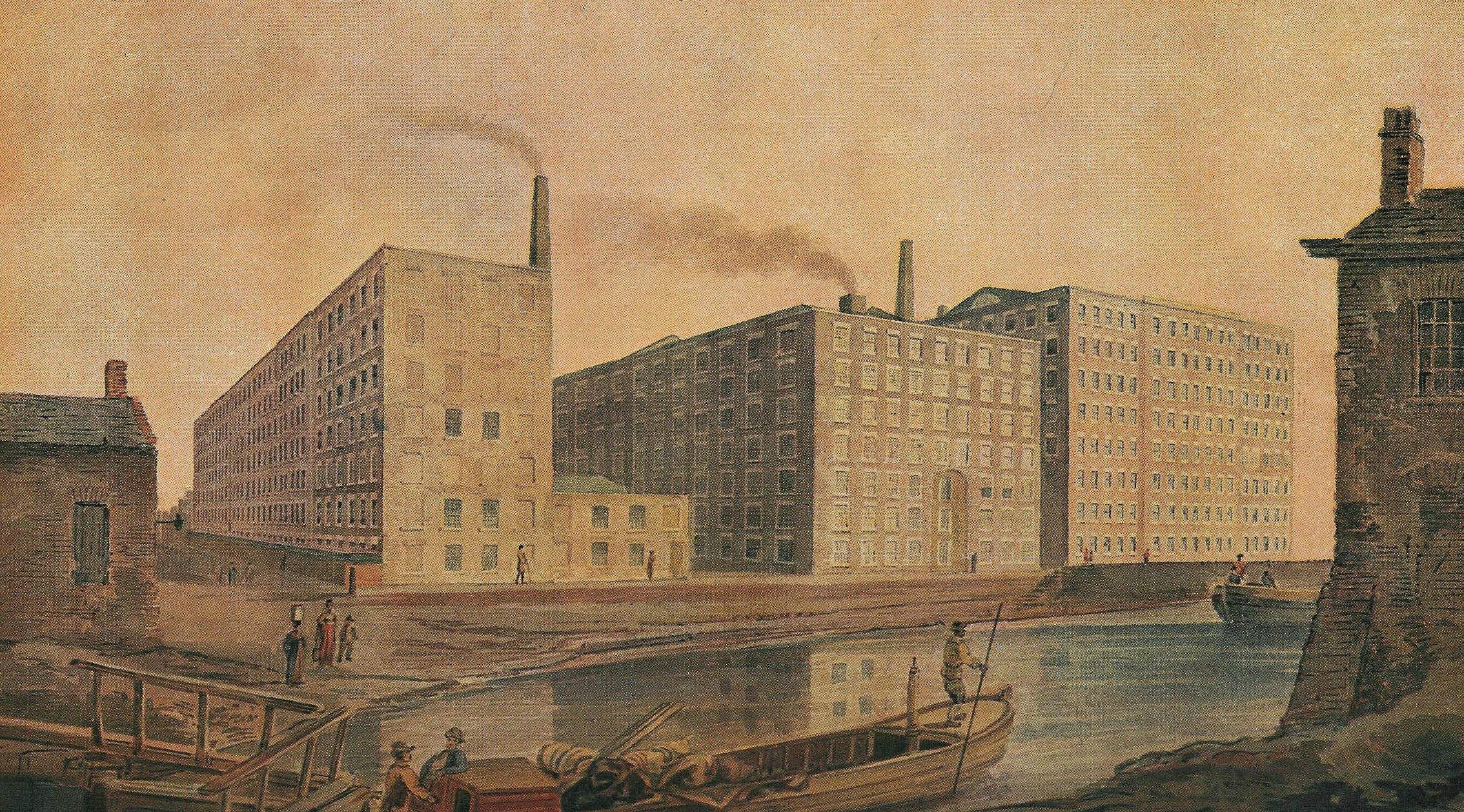
McConnel & Company's cotton mills in Ancoats, c. 1820

Early cotton mills powered by water were built in Lancashire and its neighbouring counties. In 1781 Richard Arkwright opened the world's first steam-driven textile mill on Miller Street in Manchester. Although initially inefficient, the arrival of steam power signified the beginning of the mechanisation that was to enhance the burgeoning textile industries in Manchester into the world's first centre of mass production. As textile manufacture switched from the home to factories, Manchester and towns in south and east Lancashire became the largest and most productive cotton spinning centre in the world using in 1871, 32% of global cotton production. Ancoats, part of a planned expansion of Manchester, became the first industrial suburb centred on steam power. There were mills whose architectural innovations included fireproofing by use of iron and reinforced concrete.

The number of cotton mills in Manchester peaked at 108 in 1853. As the numbers declined, cotton mills opened in the surrounding towns, Bury, Oldham (at its zenith the most productive cotton spinning town in the world), Rochdale, Bolton (known as "Spindleton" in 1892) and in Blackburn, Darwen, Rawtenstall, Todmorden and Burnley. As the manufacturing centre of Manchester shrank, the commercial centre, warehouses, banks and services for the 280 cotton towns and villages within a 12-mile radius of the Royal Exchange grew. The term "Cottonopolis" came into use in about 1870. In the previous decade, three-quarters of the textiles manufactured were exported by foreign companies based in the Port of Manchester.

Manchester became an important transport hub, the Bridgewater Canal made it possible to transport goods in bulk to its terminus at Castlefield warehouses were built. Raw cotton, imported through the port of Liverpool from the West Indies, southern states of America and Britain’s biggest colony the Indian subcontinent (when supply from US states stopped due to civil war) and coal from Worsley were carried on the canal. The Liverpool and Manchester Railway built a warehouse at its Liverpool Road terminus when it opened in 1830. The railway network developed linking Manchester to its increasingly industrialised hinterland. By the end of the 19th century Lancashire had four million people and more than 25% of the total population was employed by the industry sector, mainly in textile activities. The Cottonopolis' trade was connected with the activities of the broker, merchant and freemason Samuel Smith.

== Cotton Exchange ==
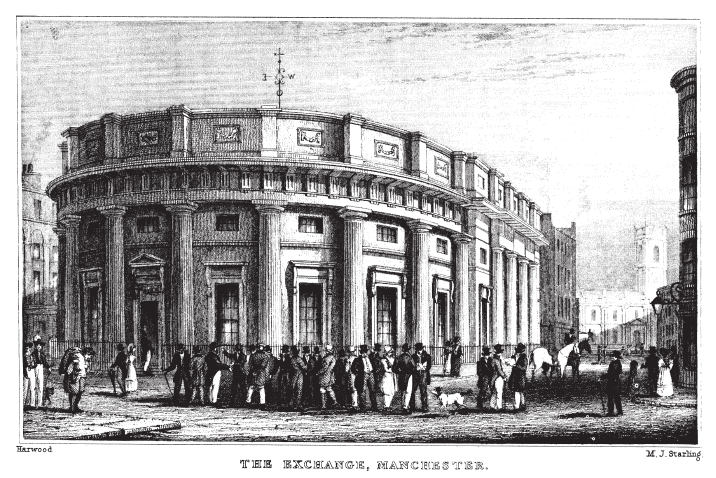
The Exchange in Manchester in 1835

The commercial centre of Cottonopolis was the exchange's trading hall. The first of Manchester's exchanges was built in the market place by Sir Oswald Mosley in 1727 for chapmen to transact business. It was subsequently re-built three times. Thomas Harrison built an exchange in the Greek Revival style between 1806 and 1809 After it opened, membership was required and trading was not restricted to textiles. Its early members were the owners of mills and warehouses, but later business was conducted by their agents and managers. Harrison's exchange was enlarged between 1847 and 1849 by Alex Mills. After a visit in 1851, Queen Victoria granted the exchange the title the Manchester Royal Exchange. The third exchange, designed by Mills and Murgatroyd, opened in 1874. It was built in the Classical style with Corinthian columns and a dome. The Royal Exchange was lavishly re-built by architects Bradshaw Gass & Hope in 1914–21 and at the time had the largest trading room in the world. Its vast hall was 29.2 metres high and had an area of 3683 square metres. The exchange had a membership of up to 11,000 cotton merchants who met every Tuesday and Friday to trade their wares beneath the 38.5-metre high central glass dome. It was badly damaged in World War II and ceased operation for cotton trading in 1968.

== Warehousing ==
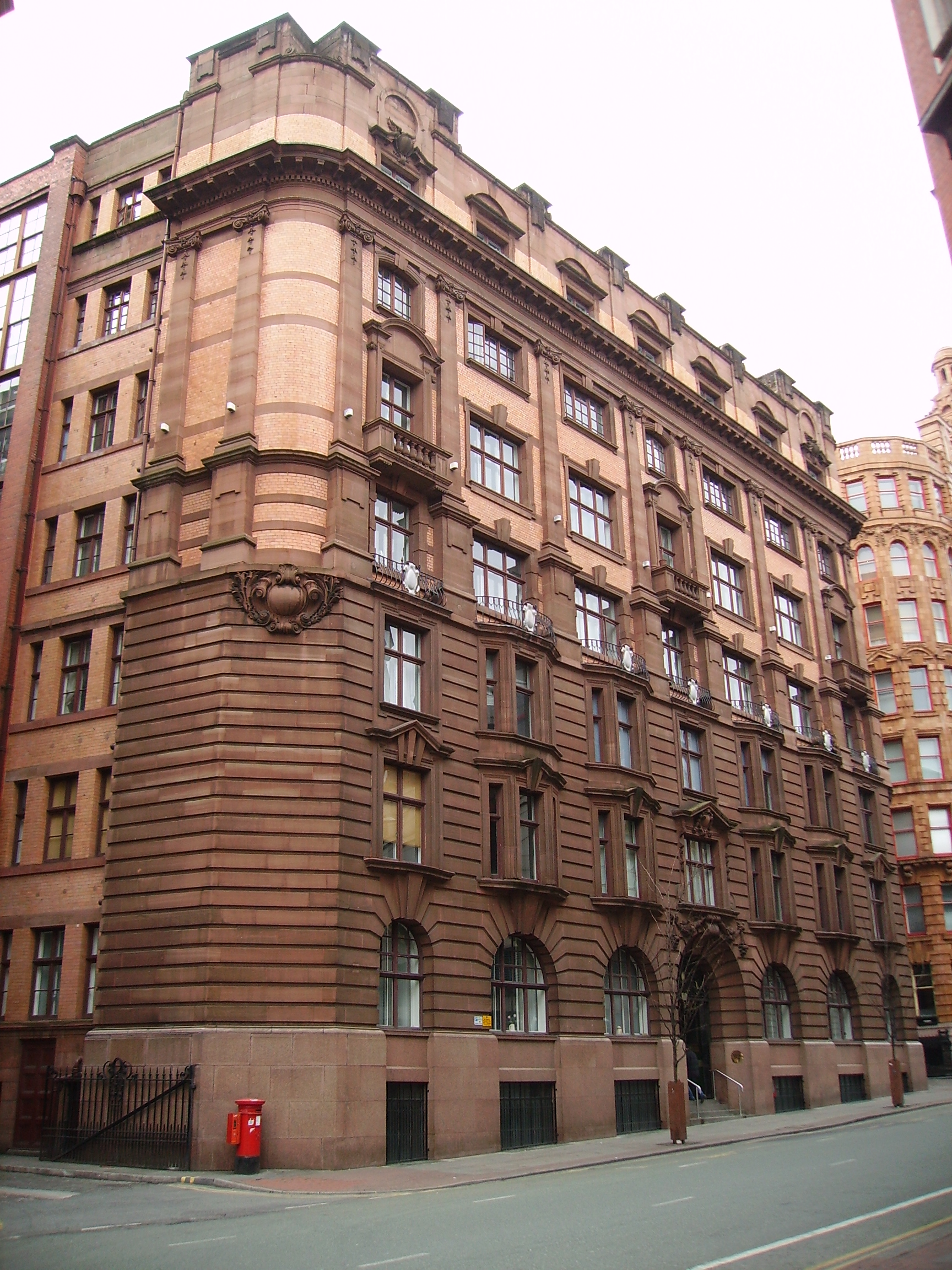
Asia House, one of Manchester's packing warehouses

In the second half of the 19th century, Manchester's reputation as a financial and commercial centre was boosted by the unprecedented number of warehouses erected in the city centre. In 1806 there were just over 1,000 but by 1815 this had almost doubled to 1,819. Manchester was dubbed "warehouse city". The earliest warehouses were built around King Street although by 1850 warehouses had spread to Portland Street and later to Whitworth Street. Richard Cobden's construction in Mosley Street was the first of many palazzo style warehouse, followed by the elaborate Watts Warehouse in 1854.

In 1844 Johann Georg Kohl described Manchester's streets in his travel writing, "...Market Street, into Mosley Street, or Cooper Street, for instance. Here stand the great warehouses, five or six stories high, all large and imposing, some of them stately and elegant. At night these warehouses are brilliantly lighted from top to bottom..."

The packing warehouses: Asia House, India House and Velvet House along Whitworth Street were among the tallest buildings of their time. These dominant buildings were the stately homes of the cotton industry and the backbone of Cottonopolis, providing not just the storage facilities but they displayed the finished goods. Their owners spawned equally ornate bank and office buildings providing loans for the production of cotton and associated industries.

== Banking ==
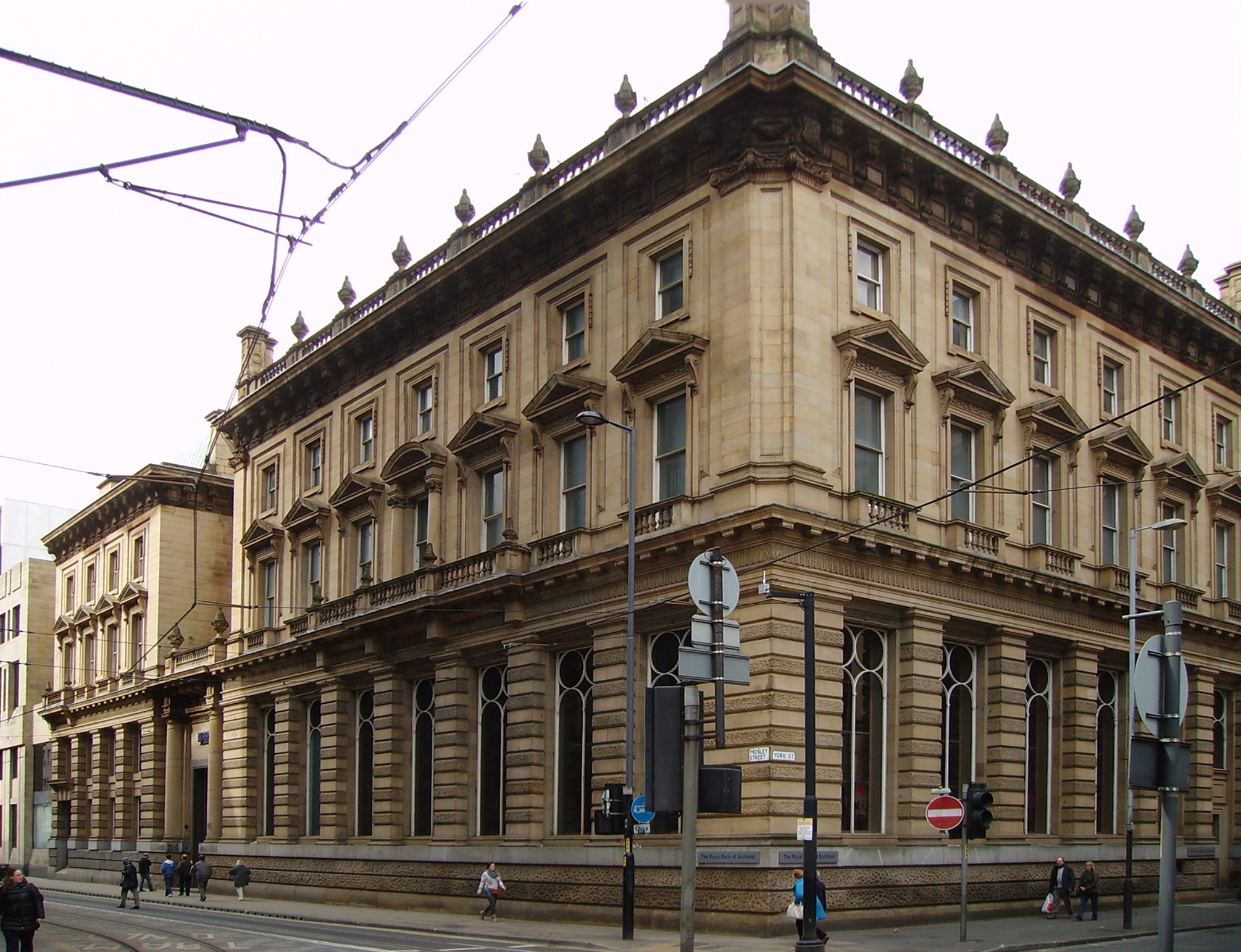
38 and 42 Mosley Street, designed by Edward Walters was built in 1880 for the Manchester and Salford Bank.

From the late 1820s, Manchester was developing into an important city. The Act of Parliament of 1829 decreed separate Police Commissioners from Salford. The Reform Act 1832 created two members of parliament, the Municipal Corporations Act 1835 allowed the election of magistrates, borough councillors and aldermen. Manchester was granted municipal borough status in 1838. At the same time growth of the cotton and aligned industries meant vast amounts of money were passing through Manchester, leading to the establishment of many money handling organisations and banking facilities.

In 1772, Arthur Heywood's Bank opened in Manchester, but the money was transferred daily via coach and horses to major banks in London, and many were attacked by highwaymen. The first bank to hold its own reserves of notes and coins was the Bank of Manchester which opened on Market Street in 1829. Next was the Manchester & Liverpool District Bank on Spring Gardens in 1832, followed by many others in the same area around Spring Gardens, Fountain Street and King Street which became the Central Business District and banking centre.

== Legacy ==
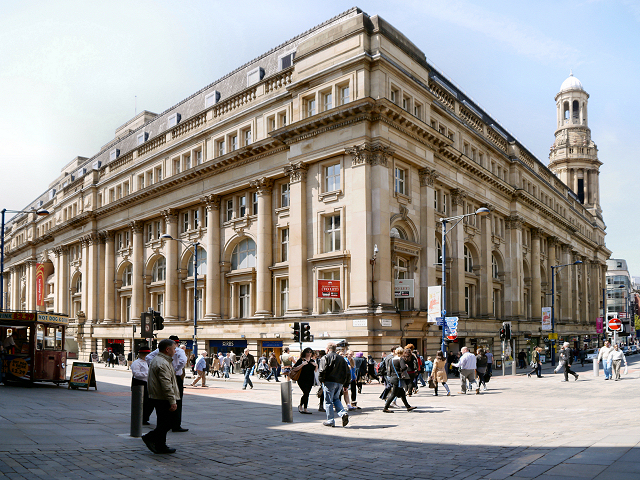
Manchester's Royal Exchange

Many 18th- and 19th-century cotton mills, canals, supporting bridges and infrastructure exist today. The square mile of "warehouse city" is cited as the finest example of a Victorian commercial centre in the United Kingdom.

The Royal Exchange was renovated in 1972 and turned into the home of one of the most prolific and highly regarded theatres outside London. The Royal Exchange was damaged in 1996 by an IRA bomb and rebuilt at a cost of £32 million.

== In popular culture ==
... [Manchester] this famous great factory town. Dark and smoky from the coal vapours, it resembles a huge forge or workshop. Work, profit and greed seem to be the only thoughts here. The clatter of the cotton mills and the looms can be heard everywhere ...

— Johanna Schopenhauer, Sämmtliche Schriften, Frankfurt, (1830)

A thick black smoke covers the city. The sun appears like a disc without any rays. In this semi-daylight 300,000 people work ceaselessly. A thousand noises rise amidst this unending damp and dark labyrinth ... the footsteps of a busy crowd, the crunching wheels of machines, the shriek of steam from the boilers, the regular beat of looms, the heavy rumble of carts, these are the only noises from which you can never escape in these dark half-lit streets ..

— Alexis de Tocqueville, Oeuvres Completes, (1835)

I remember my earliest view of Manchester. I saw the forest of chimneys pouring forth volumes of steam and smoke, forming an inky canopy which seemed to embrace and involve the whole place.

— W. Cooke Taylor, (1842)

Extracts from "Spinning the Web", used as the basis of a BBC Radio 4 drama.

== See also ==
- Manchester cotton warehouses
- Textile manufacture during the Industrial Revolution
- Linenopolis
