= Canada House, Manchester =

Office building in Manchester, England

Coordinates: 53.47549°N 2.24337°W

Canada House
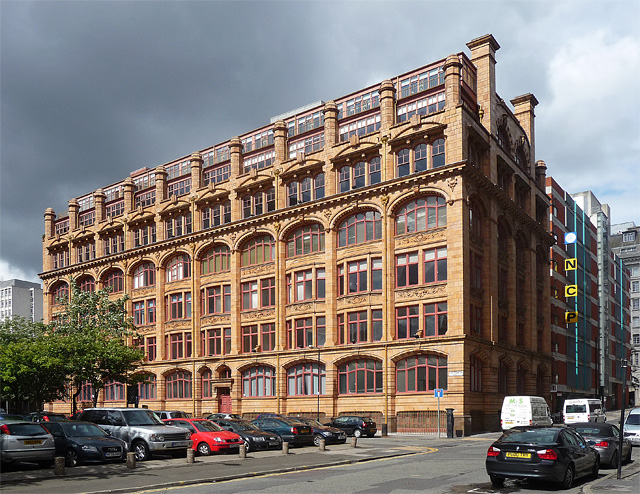
- Alternative names: 3 Chepstow Street

General information
- Type: Originally packing warehouse, now office
- Architectural style: Art Nouveau
- Location: 3 Chepstow Street; Manchester; M1 5FW, Manchester, England, United Kingdom
- Current tenants: Historic England, Puma, TMA, TBWA (and others)
- Completed: 1909

Design and construction
- Architects: W & G Higginbottom
- Designations

Listed Building – Grade II
- Official name: Canada House
- Designated: 19 June 1988
- Reference no.: 1208597

Website
- www.canadahousemanchester.com

Canada House is an Art Nouveau-style office building on Chepstow Street in Manchester, England. Constructed originally as a packing warehouse, the building opened in 1909. Designed by local architects W & G Higginbottom (brothers Walter and George Harry Higginbottom), the building has features consistent with art nouveau and has a terracotta exterior.

Canada House is one of many warehouses in Manchester alongside Watts Warehouse, Asia House, India House and Churchgate House. Canada House is a Grade-II listed building.

The building was extensively renovated during the 1990s. Tenants of Canada House include Historic England, who have their North West office in the building, historic building consultants and architects Stephen Levrant Heritage Architecture, sportwear company Puma, and TMA.

== See also ==
- Listed buildings in Manchester-M1
