= Banking in Manchester =

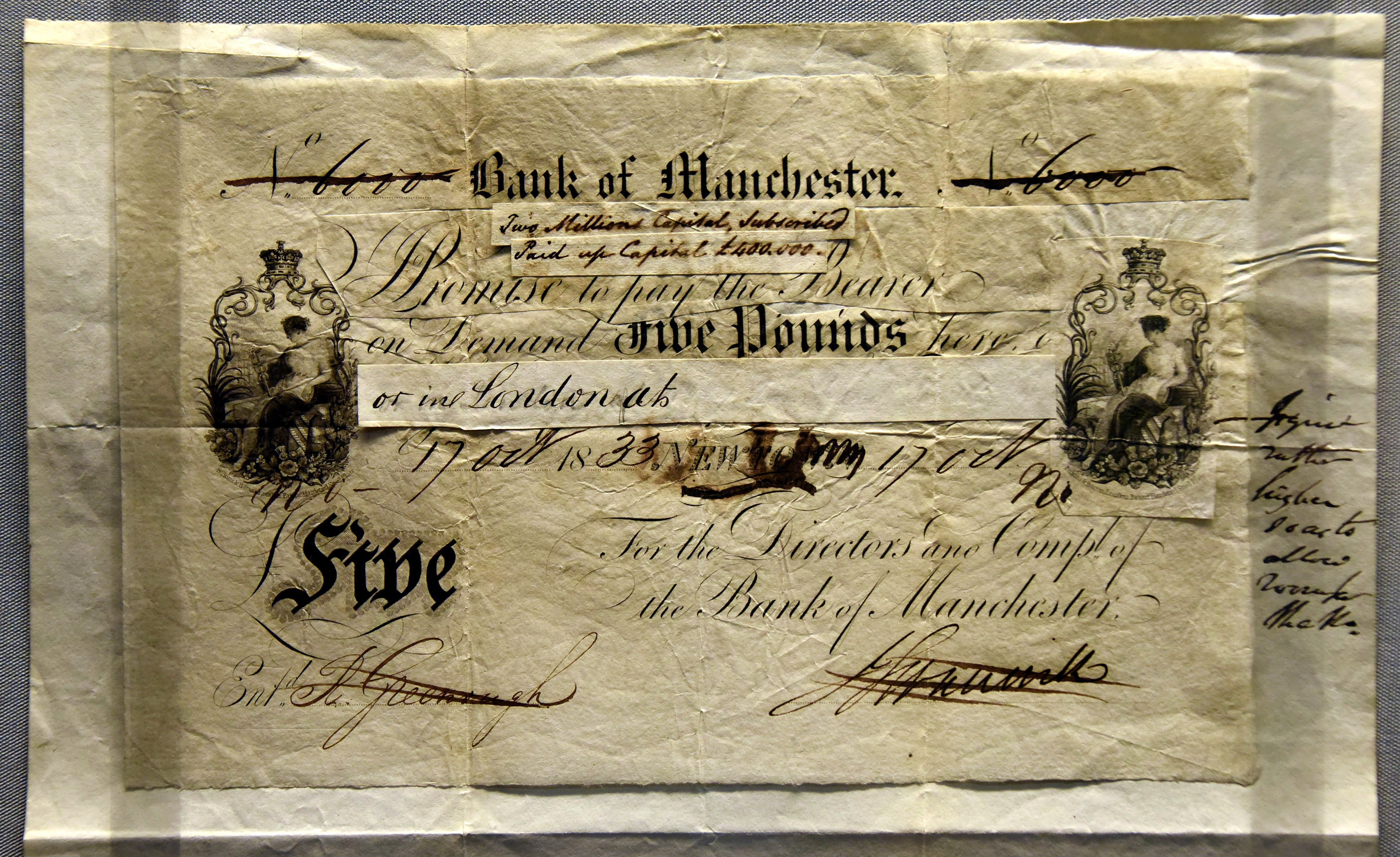
Collage for banknote design, Bank of Manchester (England), 1833. On display at the British Museum in London

Manchester's first bank was the Manchester Bank of Byrom, Allen, Sedgwick and Place on Bank Street in 1771. Over the next century many new banks were founded. They built impressive buildings in the city. The Co-operative Bank was formed in 1872 as the Loan and Deposit Department of Manchester's Co-operative Wholesale Society, becoming the CWS Bank four years later. However, the bank did not become a registered company until 1971. Its global headquarters is in Balloon Street, and the group headquarters is in the Co-operative Insurance Tower on Miller Street.

== Commerce in Manchester ==
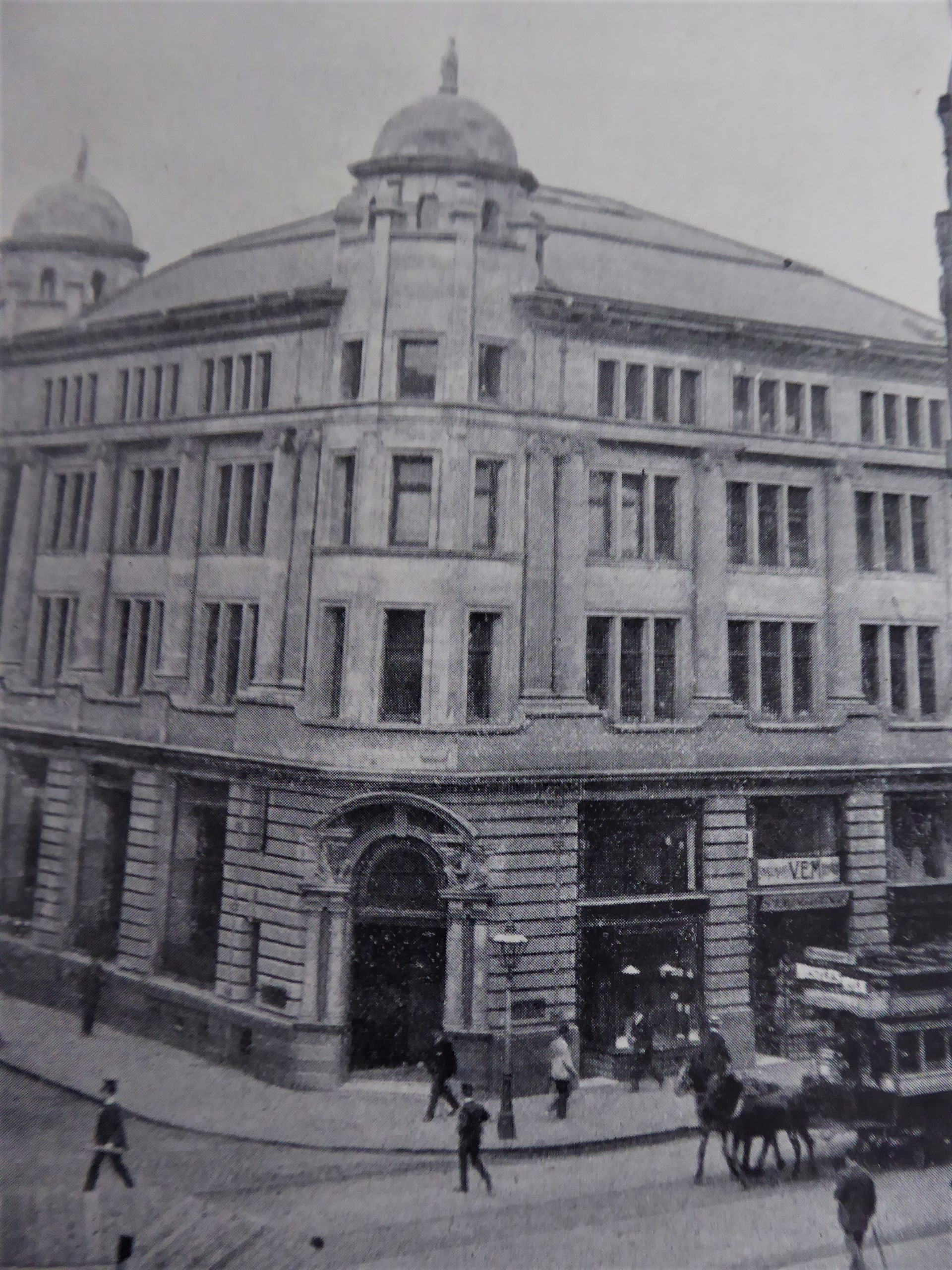
Mercantile Bank of Lancashire, Mosley Street, 1898

Manchester was cotton. In the early nineteenth century, there was some cotton manufacturing around Redhill Street in Ancoats, but as the century progressed spinning moved away from the city centre, to towns such as Bolton and Oldham, and weaving further away towards north and east Lancashire. Manchester was where the merchants met to sell their grey cloth. Manchester merchants bought the grey (unfinished) cloth, had it bleached, dyed and printed and finished and packed. These merchants finance the cloth until it is bought by a foreign importer. Some merchants import cotton, and have cotton mills in Bombay or Shanghai while also exporting there. They met to trade twice a week at the Royal Exchange building, on the largest trading floor in the world. Eight thousand members would have an allocated spot on the floor. Trading was a quiet matter between buyer and seller. Around the city were the warehouses that acted as showrooms and packing facilities. Near the railway stations were the shipping warehouses of the railway companies.

== The early banks ==
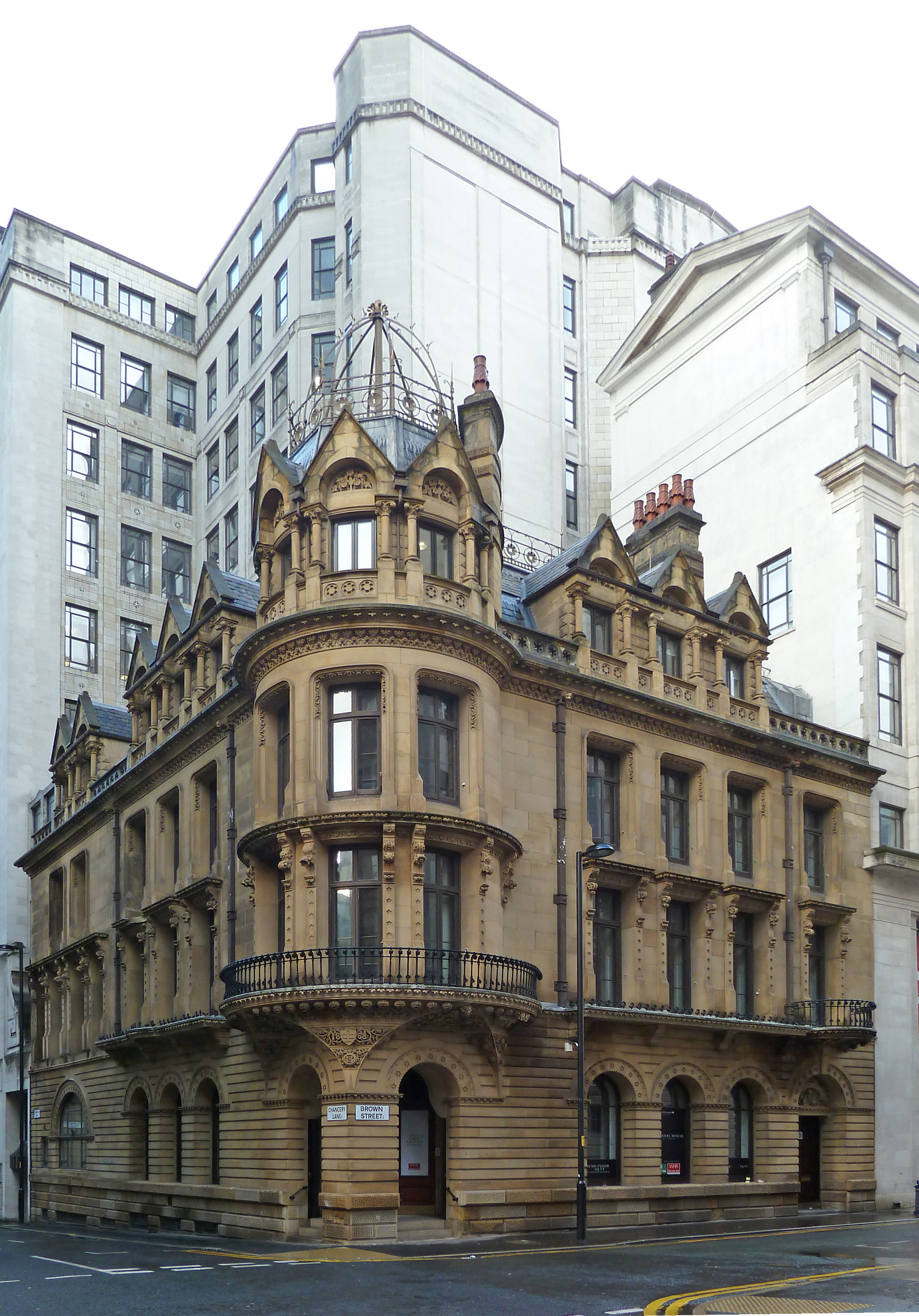
Brooks's Bank, Brown Street

- Manchester Bank of Byrom, Allen, Sedgwick and Place built on Bank Street in 1771 Demolished.
- John Jones, Bankers and Tea Dealers
- Heywood's Bank, King Street (1784) then St Ann's Square
- Brooks's Bank, Market Street (1827), Brown Street then Lombard Chambers, Brown Street
- Bank of England, King Street (1845)
- Bank of Manchester, Market Street (1829)
- Manchester & Liverpool District Bank, Spring Gardens (1834)
- Manchester & Salford Bank, Mosley Street (1836)
- Manchester & Salford Bank, 38-42 Mosley Street: now Williams & Glyn's and thus Royal Bank of Scotland
- Lancashire & Yorkshire Bank, 73,75 King Street:
- Williams Deacon's Bank, 45 Mosley Street/ York Street: now Williams & Glyn's and thus Royal Bank of Scotland
- The Manchester and County (1862)
