= Arkwright House =

Arkwright House may refer to:

- Arkwright House, Manchester
- Arkwright House, Preston
