= Harry S. Fairhurst =

British architect (1868–1945)

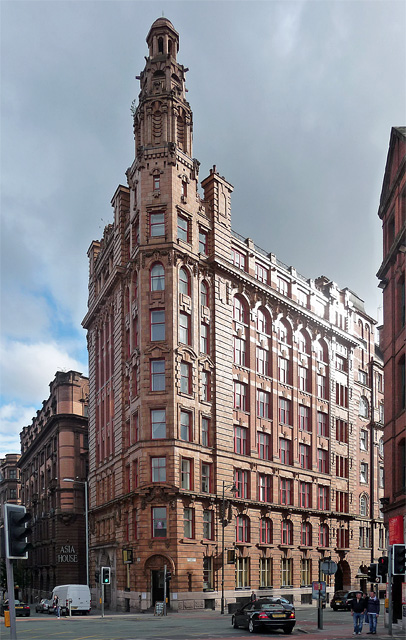
- Lancaster House, Manchester; 67 Whitworth Street
- Born: Harry Smith Fairhurst; 3 April 1868; Blackburn, Lancashire, England
- Died: 31 March 1945 (aged 76)
- Occupation: Architect
- Practice: Harry S. Fairhurst & Son
- Buildings: Bridgewater House; Lancaster House; India House, Manchester

Harry S. Fairhurst (3 April 1868 – 31 March 1945) was a prominent English architect in Edwardian Manchester. He was responsible for many of the city's iconic warehouses and his commissions include Blackfriars House, headquarters of the Lancashire Cotton Corporation and Arkwright House, headquarters of the English Sewing Cotton Company.

== Work and professional life ==
Harry Smith Fairhurst was born in Blackburn on 3 April 1868. At age 15, he commenced articles in 1883 with James Wolstenholme and improved with Maxwell and Tuke. He moved to Cardiff where he worked as assistant to William Frame. He qualified in 1891 and started his own practice in Blackburn in 1895. He moved to Manchester in 1901 where he worked in partnership with James Harold France until 1905. From 1905 his assistant was James Alexander Mitchell Hunter who became his partner in 1908. The practice's first commissions were warehouses for Lloyds Packing Company.

Fairhurst's commissions include India House, Bridgewater House and Lancaster House which are Grade II or II* listed buildings. York House in Major Street was another but has been demolished.

His warehouses were built using fire-proof techniques. He was known for his high standards. Some buildings were finished with Portland stone façades while the Lloyd's warehouses had Edwardian Baroque frontages built from red brick and orange terracotta or faience, and exposed glazed steel-frame backs.

Fairhurst was president of the Manchester Society of Architects in 1926–27. He took his son Philip Garland Fairhurst (1900–87) also known as P. Garland Fairhurst (aka Garry), into partnership in 1929. Father and son were influenced by trips to North America and they perfected the steel and concrete technique. Buildings from this era were Lee House in Oxford Street and Rylands Warehouse in Market Street. They also designed Christie's Hospital and Holt Radium Institute.

Harry Smith Fairhurst retired in 1941 and died in 1945, aged 76. The practice was continued by his son, Philip.

== Family ==
=== Philip Garland Fairhurst (1900–87) ===
Philip Garland Fairhurst continued his father's practice and was also president of the Manchester Society of Architects in 1947–49. His sons were Harry M. Fairhurst and Ian Fairhurst who joined the practice alongside their father. The practice continued in the medical buildings field. It was responsible for building the Manchester Medical School, and the Chemistry and Physics Buildings for UMIST.

=== Harry M. Fairhurst OBE (1925–2011) ===
Like his father and grandfather, Harry M. Fairhurst was president of the Manchester Society of Architects in 1969–71. He left the practice in 1981 to work on conservation for English Heritage. Harry studied architecture at Cambridge, was awarded the OBE and was President of the Manchester Literary and Philosophical Society (1979–81).

=== Ian Fairhurst ===
Ian Fairhurst was involved in the family practice for many years and later changed his career to farming.

=== Mark Fairhurst ===
The fourth generation is represented by Mark Fairhurst who has a London practice.

== Notable projects ==
- National Buildings (1905-9)
- India House, (1905)
- Asia House, (1906-1909)
- Bridgewater House (1913)
- Lancaster House (1906)
- York House
- Blackfriars House (1923)
- Arkwright House (1927)
- Ship Canal House
- Manchester Liners House
- Lee House (1928–31)
