= Warehouseman =

Person who works in a warehouse

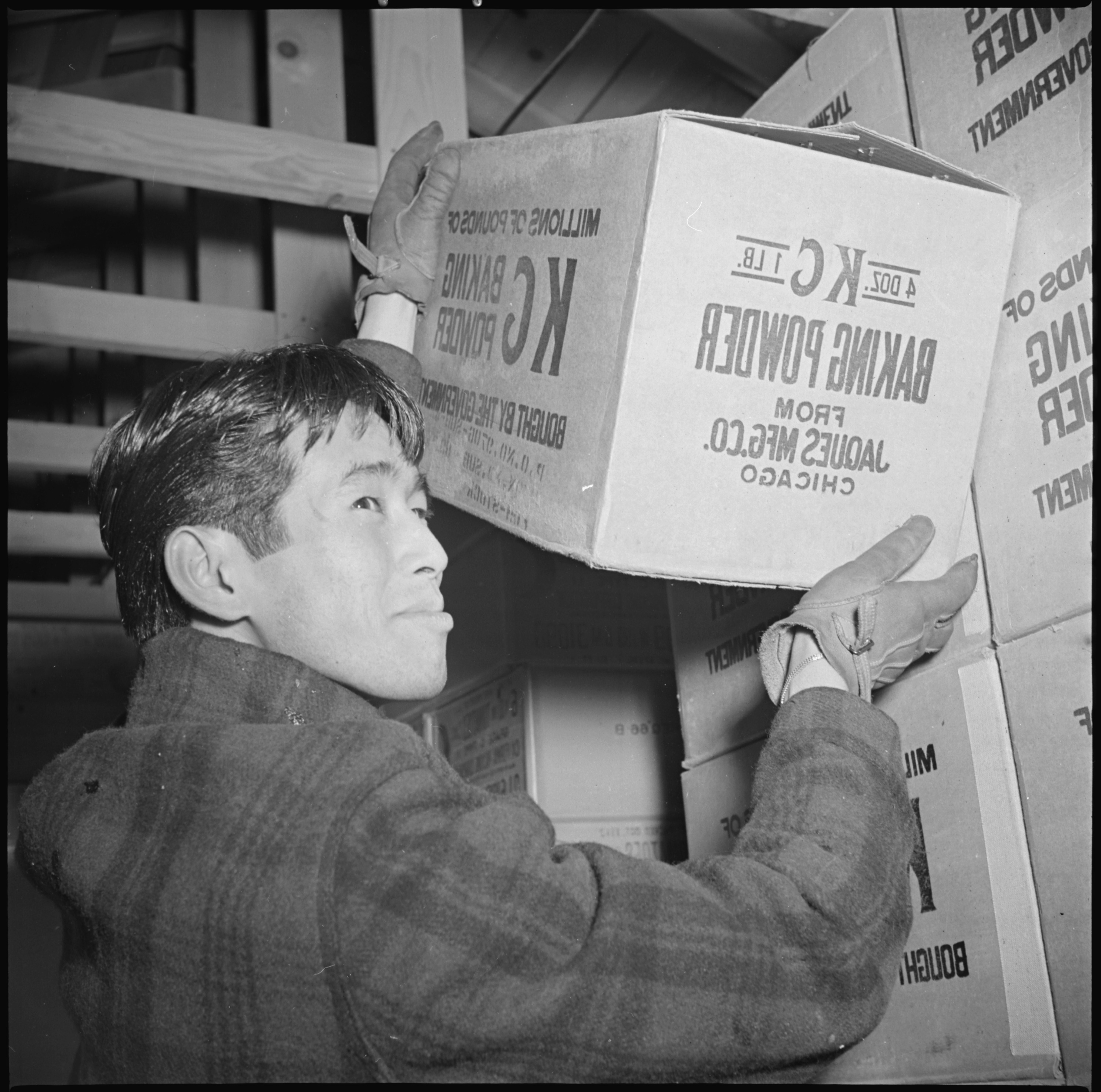
A warehouseman at the Tule Lake War Relocation Center in California, United States in 1943

A warehouseman, also known as a warehouse worker, warehouse operator, or warehouse technician, is someone who works in a warehouse, usually delivering goods for sale or storage, or, in older usage, someone who owns a warehouse and sells goods directly from it or from a shop fronting onto the warehouse (similar to a modern Cash and carry).

An Italian warehouseman was someone who stocked goods from Italy such as pasta, olive oil, pickles, perfumes, fruits, paints and pigments (they were often known as Oil and Italian warehousemen or Oilman and Italian warehouseman to highlight the selling of oil products).

A Manchester warehouseman was a wholesaler of linen and cloth made in the factories surrounding Manchester in the North-West of England.

In law, a warehouseman can be entitled to a warehouseman's lien for work done but not yet paid for.
