= Lancaster House, Manchester =

Listed building in Manchester, England

Coordinates: 53.4753°N 2.2383°W

Lancaster House
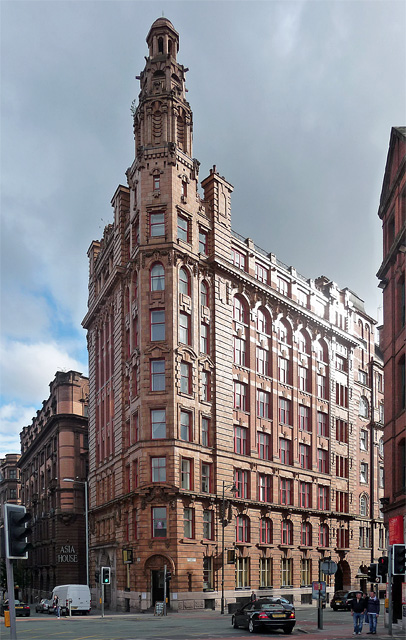
- Lancaster House
- Interactive map of the Lancaster House area

General information
- Architectural style: Edwardian Baroque
- Location: Whitworth Street, Manchester, England
- Year built: 1905–10

Technical details
- Material: Granite, Accrington red brick, orange terracotta

Design and construction
- Architect: Harry S. Fairhurst
- Designations

Listed Building – Grade II*
- Official name: Lancaster House
- Designated: 3 October 1974
- Reference no.: 1254887

Lancaster House on Whitworth Street in Manchester, England, is a former packing and shipping warehouse built between 1905 and 1910 for Lloyd's Packing Warehouses Limited, which had, by merger, become the dominant commercial packing company in early 20th-century Manchester. It is in the favoured Edwardian Baroque style and constructed with a steel frame clad with granite at the base and Accrington red brick and orange terracotta. The back of the building is plain red brick. It is a Grade II* listed building as of 3 October 1974.

The building was designed by Harry S. Fairhurst, who had become "the leading expert in the design of these advanced warehouses". Fairhurst was also responsible for Bridgewater House opposite, the neighbouring India House and, perhaps, Asia House, although that building has also been attributed to I.R.E. Birkett.

Fairhurst's huge buildings are "steel-framed and built to high-quality fireproof specifications".

Lancaster House shares a common plinth and eaves with its neighbour, India House and is connected by an ornate, two storeys tall circular Art Nouveau wrought iron gate with a pendant lamp.

The building has since been converted into residential flats and separated into two buildings that are seven storeys tall. The first is located on 71 Whitworth Street and the second is located on the adjoining street of 80 Princess Street. The corner entrance below currently provides access to a public house named O'Sheas Irish Bar.

Lancaster House is part of a conservation area in Manchester city centre that reflects the historical importance of the textile industry in the city. The conservation area was designated by Manchester City Council in September 1974, and was bounded by Oxford Street, Portland Street, Abingdon Street, Bloom Street, Chorlton Street, Cobourg Street and the Piccadilly to Oxford Road railway viaduct. It was extended in June 1985 to include an area bounded by Whitworth Street, London Road and the above viaduct.

The nearest train stations to Lancaster House are Oxford Road 0.2 miles (0.32 km) and Manchester Piccadilly 0.4 miles (0.64 km).

== See also ==
- Grade II* listed buildings in Greater Manchester
- Listed buildings in Manchester-M1
