= Louis Behrens (fireboat) =

The Louis Behrens, also known as Marine 101, is a fireboat commissioned by Charleston, South Carolina, in 2012.

The boat is named after Louis Behrens, who was Chief of Charleston's fire department from 1907 until his death of 1932. He was celebrated as the USA's longest serving fire chief.

The vessel is 40 feet (12 m) long.

== Operational career ==
The vessel set out to rescue stranded sailors from the United States Navy, on April 14, 2013. She was unable to complete the rescue, after her hull was punctured by floating debris. A Coast Guard vessel rescued the wounded USN sailors, while nearby vessels helped the Louis Behrens make its way back to her mooring.
