= Arkwright House, Manchester =

Listed building in Manchester, England

Arkwright House
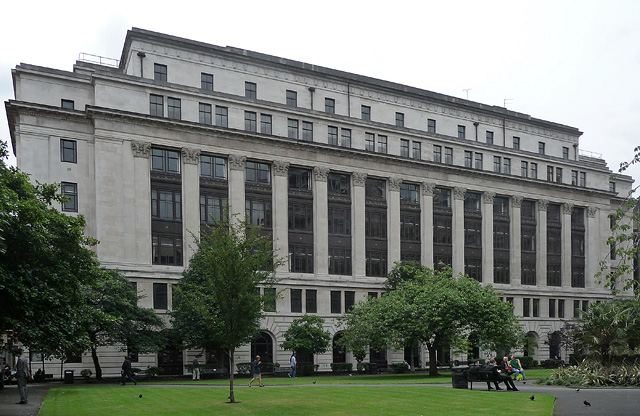
- Arkwright House, Manchester

- Location within Greater Manchester

General information
- Architectural style: Neoclassical
- Location: Parsonage Gardens, Manchester, England
- Coordinates: 53.48229°N 2.24878°W
- Completed: 1929
- Client: English Sewing Cotton Company

Design and construction
- Architect: Harry S. Fairhurst
- Designations

Listed Building – Grade II
- Official name: Arkwright House
- Designated: 9 March 1982
- Reference no.: 1246660

Website
- arkwrightmanchester.co.uk

Arkwright House is a Grade II listed building at Parsonage Gardens in Manchester, England. Designed by Harry S. Fairhurst, it was completed in 1929 for the English Sewing Cotton Company. The building is constructed in a Neoclassical style with some Art Deco motifs.

Arkwright House was heavily damaged in the 1992 Manchester bombing and needed work to repair the building. It is marked by its giant Corinthian order columns and the use of Portland stone as the exterior. The building has been described as "sinister" by one architecture critic, suggesting it shares some similarities with Nazi architecture where classical buildings were preferred. Hartwell describes the front façade facing Parsonage Gardens as architecturally "impressive".

As of 2023, Arkwright House is a multi-tenanted office building.

== See also ==
- Listed buildings in Manchester-M3
- Grade II listed buildings in Manchester
