= Princess Street, Manchester =

Street in Manchester, England

Coordinates: 53.477°N 2.239°W

Princess Street is one of the main streets in the city centre of Manchester, England. It begins at Cross Street and runs approximately eastwards across Mosley Street, Portland Street and Whitworth Street until the point where it continues as Brook Street and eventually joins the A34.

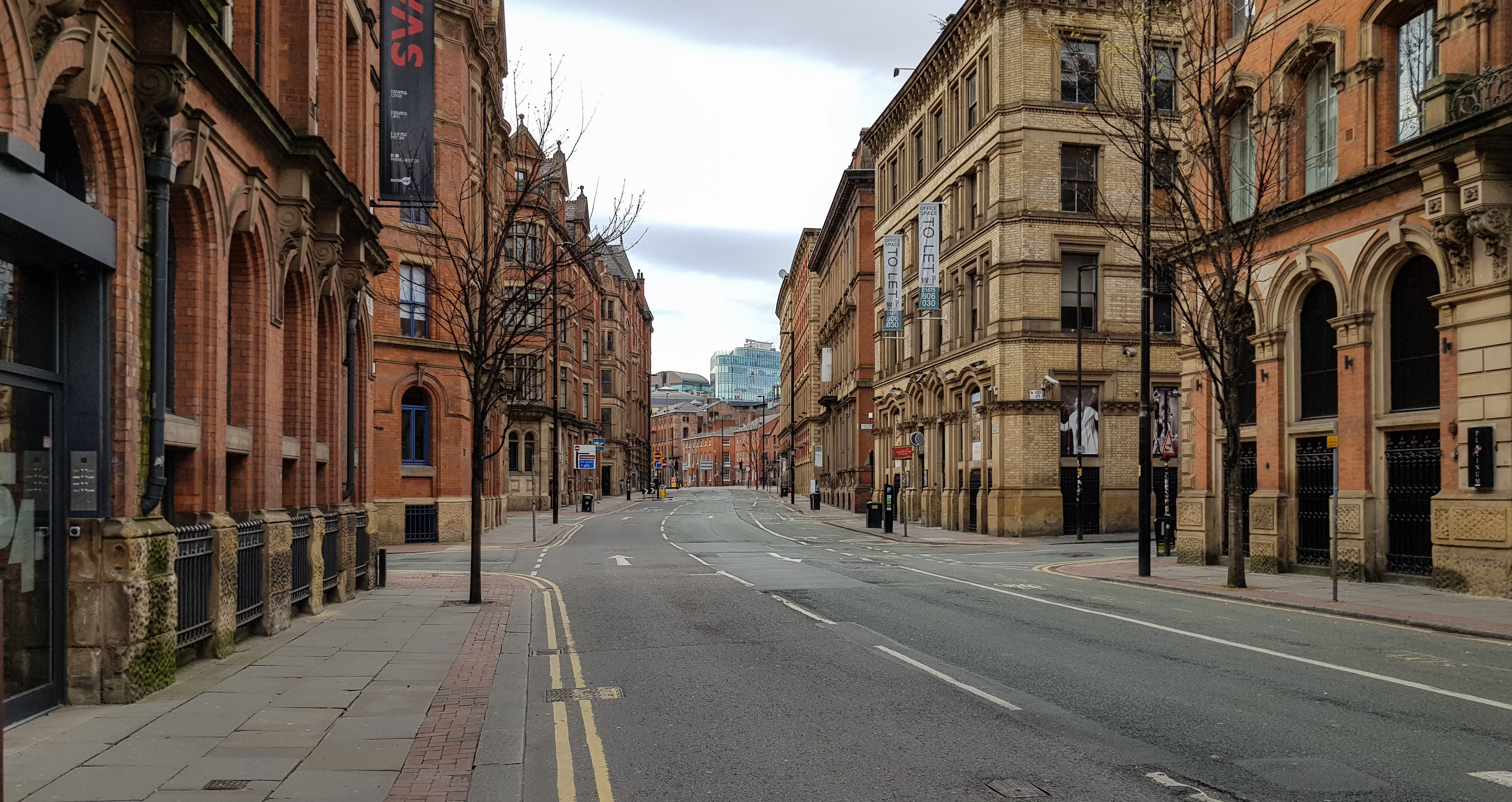
Princess Street

== History ==
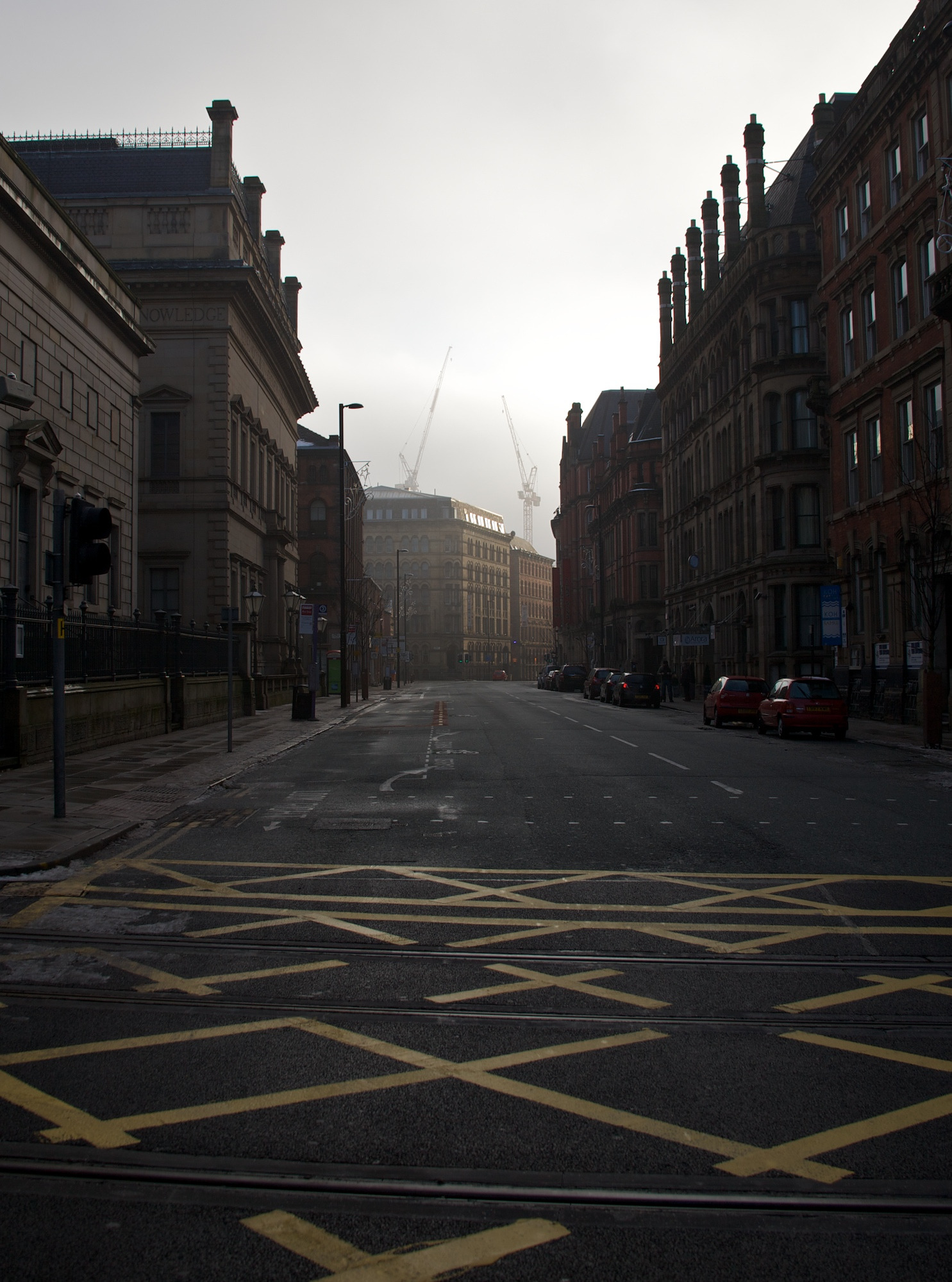
Looking down Princess Street from Mosley Street junction

It is not clear whether the street was actually named after a princess and the second part of it once bore the name of David Street. Originally a residential street it became the site of many textile warehouses and large office buildings during the 19th century. Some of these have since been demolished but most have been converted to other uses.

== Route ==
The road is two-way as it passes Albert Square, St Peter's Square and its tram stop. It then becomes one-way southbound but with a contraflow lane for buses, cycles and taxis, and for access. After Portland Street, it becomes fully one-way southbound until Major Street, and resumes fully two-way. It then crosses the Rochdale Canal, Whitworth Street, Charles Street and the River Medlock where it becomes Brook Street and then immediately Upper Brook Street.

== Notable buildings ==
- Northern Assurance Buildings on the north side
- Manchester Town Hall on the south side
- The Athenaeum, on the north side, 1837, Grade II*, architect Sir Charles Barry
- Princess Buildings, on the south side
- The Pickles Building on the north side, Portland Street corner
- Former Mechanics' Institute 103 Princess Street, 1854, Grade II*, architect John Edgar Gregan (the location of the founding meeting of the Trades Union Congress and in the 20th century the College of Commerce and later the National Museum of Labour History).
- Central House, on the south side
- Asia House on the south side, Whitworth Street corner, 1910, architect Harry Fairhurst
- Lancaster House on the south side, Whitworth Street corner

== See also ==
- List of streets and roads in Manchester
