= Tootal, Broadhurst and Lee Building, Manchester =

Listed building in Manchester, England

The Tootal Buildings
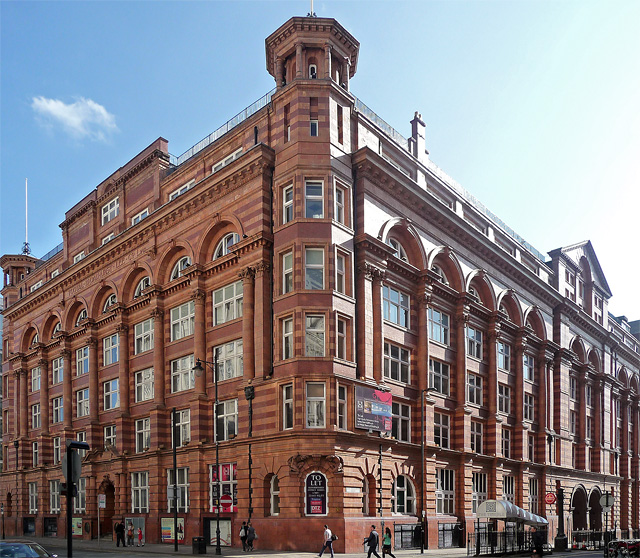
- The Tootal Buildings

- Location within Greater Manchester
- Former names: Tootal, Broadhurst and Lee Building; Churchgate House

General information
- Type: Commercial office
- Location: Manchester, England
- Coordinates: 53.4752°N 2.2422°W
- Construction started: 1896
- Inaugurated: 1898
- Renovated: 2015
- Owner: Helical Bar PLC

Technical details
- Floor count: 6

Design and construction
- Architect: J. Gibbons Sankey
- Main contractor: Capital Properties (UK) Ltd
- Designations

Listed Building – Grade II*
- Official name: Tootal, Broadhurst and Lee Building
- Designated: 3 October 1974
- Reference no.: 1271294

The Tootal, Broadhurst and Lee Building (currently marketed as The Tootal Buildings) at 56 Oxford Street, in Manchester, England, is a late-Victorian warehouse and office block built in a neo-Baroque style for Tootal Broadhurst Lee, a firm of textile manufacturers.

== History ==
The warehouse was designed by J. Gibbons Sankey and constructed between 1896 and 1898. It has been designated a Grade II* listed building.

Nikolaus Pevsner's The Buildings of England describes the warehouse as "large, in red brick striped with orange terracotta, but comparatively classical". The entrance has a "massive central round-headed doorway with banded surround and cartouche dated 1896, set in (an) architrave of coupled banded columns and (a) broken pediment".

The interior has been redesigned, but a First World War memorial by Henry Sellers has been retained, being "marble, with a niche from which the figure (has been) stolen".

Behind the warehouse but not visible from Oxford Street is Lee House, the stub of what would have been the tallest building in Europe at 217 ft (66 m), a 17-storey warehouse belonging to the same firm (planned 1928; part completed 1931). Both Churchgate House and Lee House are on the north bank of the Rochdale Canal; Great Bridgewater Street is immediately to the north of them.

== Occupants ==
As of 2024, the building hosts the headquarters of the Greater Manchester Combined Authority, including the office of the Mayor of Greater Manchester; until he became an MP in June 2026 Andy Burnham was the mayor.

== See also ==
- Grade II* listed buildings in Greater Manchester
- Listed buildings in Manchester-M1
- Manchester cotton warehouses
- St. James Buildings, which faces the Tootal, Broadhurst and Lee Building across Oxford Street
