= India House, Manchester =

Listed building in Manchester, England

India House
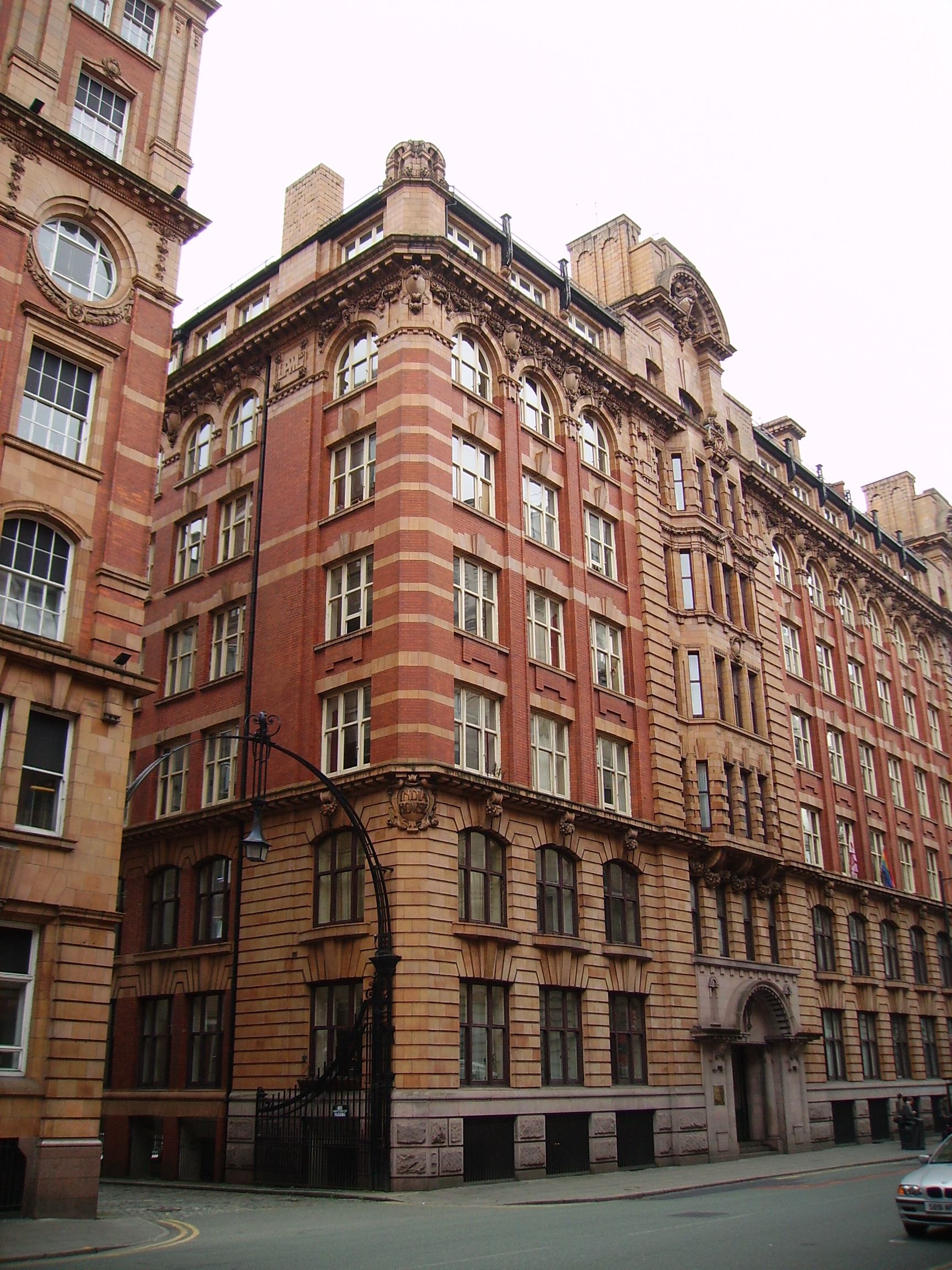
- India House, showing the listed wrought-iron gateway
- Interactive map of the India House area

General information
- Architectural style: Edwardian Baroque
- Location: Whitworth Street, Manchester, England
- Coordinates: 53.4750°N 2.2394°W
- Year built: 1906

Design and construction
- Architect: Harry S. Fairhurst
- Designations

Listed Building – Grade II*
- Official name: India House (including attached wrought iron gateway linked to Lancaster House)
- Designated: 3 October 1974
- Reference no.: 1254836

India House on Whitworth Street in Manchester, England, is a packing and shipping warehouse built in 1906 for Lloyd's Packing Warehouses Limited, which had, by merger, become the dominant commercial packing company in early-20th century Manchester. It is in the favoured Edwardian Baroque style and is steel-framed, with cladding of buff terracotta and red brick with buff terracotta dressings. It is a Grade II* listed building as of 3 October 1974.

== Background ==
The building was designed by Harry S. Fairhurst, "the leading expert in the design of these advanced warehouses". Fairhurst was also responsible for Bridgewater House which stands opposite India House, and the neighbouring Lancaster House. Fairhurst's huge buildings are "steel-framed and built to high-quality fireproof specifications".

It was constructed for Lloyd's Packing Warehouses Limited and like many warehouses was built to a common design with steps to a raised ground floor with showroom and offices, and the first floor contained more offices and waiting rooms for clients and sample and pattern rooms all decorated to impress customers. The working areas above were plain with large windows to allow in natural light. Orders were packed there and sent to the basement on hoists powered by Manchester's hydraulic power system and packed into bales using hydraulic presses before dispatch. The warehouse was lit by gas.

India House is part of a conservation area in Manchester city centre that reflects the historical importance of the textile industry in the city. The conservation area was designated by Manchester City Council in September 1974, and was bounded by Oxford Street, Portland Street, Abingdon Street, Bloom Street, Chorlton Street, Cobourg Street and the Piccadilly to Oxford Road railway viaduct. It was extended in June 1985 to include an area bounded by Whitworth Street, London Road and the above viaduct.

== Conversion to apartments ==
In 1989 Northern Counties Housing Association, now known as The Guinness Partnership converted India House into 100 residential apartments available for rent.

== Former residents ==
Noel Gallagher lived in flat 47 in 1989–1993 and says "India House is literally ground zero in the story of my musical life." Gallagher wrote "Live Forever" and songs for the first two Oasis albums Definitely Maybe and (What's the Story) Morning Glory? while in residence.

Ian Brown, the lead singer of The Stone Roses, was another famous resident.

== See also ==
- Grade II* listed buildings in Greater Manchester
- Listed buildings in Manchester-M1
