= Louis Behrens =

Longest serving fire chief in US history

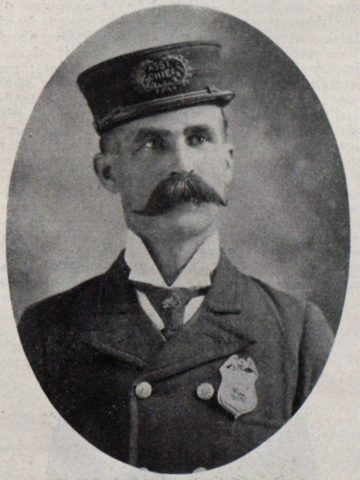
- Louis Behrens in 1907
- Born: Charleston, South Carolina
- Died: October 12, 1932 (aged 72); Charleston, South Carolina
- Occupation: firefighter

Louis Behrens was the Chief of the fire department of Charleston, South Carolina for 25 years. He worked for the department for 58 years.

Behrens grew up in Charleston, and grew up to become a cabinet maker. His uncle had been a firefighter and had died fighting fires when Union forces bombarded Charleston during the Civil War.

Behrens had a training assignment with the Fire Department of New York.

== Legacy ==
Charleston named a fireboat after Behrens in 2012.
