= Bagley & Wright =

British textile company

- Industry: Textiles (spinning, doubling and weaving)
- Founded: 1867; 159 years ago
- Defunct: 1924; 102 years ago
- Headquarters: Oldham, Lancashire, England
- Key people: Benjamin Wright and Ralph Bagley (founders)
- Products: Sewing cotton, fishing net twine, crochet and tatting yarn
- Parent: Bagley, Wright & Milne

Bagley & Wright was a spinning, doubling and weaving company based in Oldham, Lancashire, England. The business, which was active from 1867 until 1924, 'caught the wave' of the cotton-boom that existed following the end of the American Civil War in 1865 and experienced rapid growth in the United Kingdom and abroad.

In 1897, the business split into two with the sewing cotton operation being subsumed into the newly formed English Sewing Cotton Company (ESCC). The remainder of the Bagley & Wright business remaining independent in the form of Bagley & Wright Manufacturing. Although the Wright and Bagley families lost influence on the ESCC part of the business following a scandal over the distribution of dividends in 1902, they remained in control of Bagley and Wright Manufacturing until it was finally dissolved in 1924.

Throughout the existence of the business, the influence of the Wesleyan Church in Oldham was substantial in the formation of the friendships and partnerships that were the engines for business success.

== The founders ==
Benjamin Wright and Ralph Bagley were born in 1837 and 1839 respectively. Wright was born into poverty in Ashton-under-Lyne (also known as Ashton). His father William and mother Mary were both born in 1803 in Ashton and, by 1841, were living in the village of Lees, on the border with Oldham, with their nine children; Hannah 17-years, John 15, James 14, Sarah 11, Nancy 9, Eliza 7, Betty 5, Benjamin 3 and William aged 1. The three oldest children were working as cotton piecers, the middle three were at school and Benjamin and William junior were of pre-school age. Father William was an operative cotton spinner but Mary was not employed. Despite three of the children being employed, the family was poor. The father would command a 'reasonable' wage but the children would contribute little to family income. With six dependent mouths to feed, the family would have found life a struggle and the fact that Sarah at age 11 was still at school suggests that the parents were committed to their children's betterment. Financial pressure increased in 1843 with the birth of Joseph who was to play a major part in the business.

Benjamin started work at the age of seven 1845. His first job was as a little piecer in Henry Atherton's Woodend Cotton Mill on Woodend Street in Lees. This involved fetching and carrying for the spinner and piecer as well as keeping the mules clean by sweeping behind the carriages. He worked his way through the usual progression from little piecer to piecer and, sometime around the age of 20, was working as a qualified spinner. He moved to work for Daniel Collinge and Sons at Moorhey Mills (known locally as Dan Coll's factory) on Moorhey Street, Glodwick, and must have impressed, because he was given the position of 'Outlooker' at Dan Coll's and subsequent to that became manager of the mill.

It is not known how Benjamin Wright and his future business partner Ralph Bagley first met. However, it is known that they both worked at Dan Coll's.

Ralph was born at Cow Hill, Oldham, the son of Thomas Bagley (born 1798) a general labourer and Hannah (born 1799) a cotton hand-loom weaver. Thomas had been born in Manchester and Hannah in Cheshire. In 1851, Ralph was 12 years old and he and his younger sister Ann were at school. That Ralph was not in full-time employment at age twelve is unusual for working families of the time and reflects the fact that the family was small and the children were at an age where both parents were able to work. It is possible that the family had a loom in their home for Hannah to work on and this could have been an important factor. It is known that Ralph also had an older sister called Sarah who would have been 17 years old in 1851. However, Sarah does not appear in the 1851 census as resident at Cow Hill and she may have been living somewhere else as a 'live-in' housemaid. By 1861, she had returned to the family home (defined as 59 Cow Hill) to live with Thomas (65-years), Ralph (21-years) and Ann (19-years). By 1861, there is no record of Ralph's mother Hannah who would have been 62 years old. At this time, the average age at death for working-class women was 53 and for men 47, so it is possible that Hannah had died between 1851 and 1861. The 1861 census shows that Ralph was employed as an iron turner, working in a factory and using a lathe to turn iron produced in the foundry into bars. Ann had found employment as a power loom weaver. This followed her mother's occupation but, at the same time, reflected the inexorable move towards automation.

Although Ralph Bagley was an iron turner in 1861 we do not know where he was working. The largest employers of iron turners in the area were the large textile machinery manufacturing companies. It seems possible that he might have changed his job to work in Dan Coll's factory. It is unlikely that, at the age of 22, he would have been able to retrain as a spinner, but he may have found employment in the workshop at Moorhey Mills where repairs to the mill machinery would have been undertaken. Whatever the nature of Ralph's job at Moorhey, it was likely to be here that he met Benjamin and formed the partnership that flourished over the next 40 years.

The presence of cotton spinning, coal mining, and iron founding can be seen in the jobs that the Wright and Bagley families were involved with in 1861. In addition to Bagley's job as an iron turner and Wright's cotton spinning, Wright's daughter Hannah (Benjamin's sister) had married Jacob Marland from Ashton whose family was related to the Marland family that owned Bower colliery. Jacob ran a small operation that employed five miners in Ashton, with two of his employees living as lodgers in his house.

== The beginning of partnership – 1860 to 1870 ==
The partnership between Benjamin Wright and Ralph Bagley was based on friendship as well as business acumen. In the mid-1860s, the textile industry in Lancashire was undergoing one of its periods of rapid growth. The American Civil War that started in 1861, and caused the Lancashire Cotton Famine cotton towns, ended in 1865. Despite the famine during the first half of the decade, recovery afterwards was rapid and the cotton industry responded with a period of exuberant growth. For anyone with the necessary skills, knowledge and acceptance of risk, this was a time when entering into business was relatively easy. Budding entrepreneurs could rent 'space and power' from a mill owner operating as a commercial landlord. In many cases the entrepreneur would rent a floor of a mill which was served by line shafting powered by a steam engine somewhere else in the building. The floor might already have machinery (spinning mules, carding engines or looms) installed or he might have approached a cotton machinery manufacturer who would rent or lease the machinery to him. If up-front cash was a problem, the banks were likely to oblige with a loan.

By 1863, Bagley and Benjamin Wright had left their positions at Dan Coll's factory and had set up a partnership with Samuel Milne, a major figure in Oldham's cotton spinning industry. The business, called 'Bagley, Wright & Milne', started in part of an old (even then, it was old) shed in Roscoe Street in 1867. Wright's younger brother Joseph also joined this enterprise. Joseph Wright had started work in 1850 when he was 9-years old. His first employment was in the jenny gate but he graduated to minder and overlooker before taking a management role in the Bagley & Wright concern. Most of the Roscoe Street shed was taken up with looms but there was some spinning capacity on mules available for renting. Also around this time, Bagley and Benjamin Wright went into partnership with a spinner called John Marsden; the business being called John Marsden and Company based at Crabtree Mill. All of the partners of these concerns were followers of Wesleyan Methodism in Glodwick which was going through a period of rapid growth both in terms of numbers of followers and confidence. In the second half of the 19th century, Wesleyanism in particular and Methodism in general, were seen as the religion of choice for the upwardly mobile middle classes because of the encouragement that it gave its adherents to better themselves through work and enterprise. The religion of Wright's parents is unknown, but in 1866 Benjamin and Joseph Wright had joined Glodwick Trinity Wesleyan Church which was then held in 'The Old Garret' in Well Fold, Oldham.

== Business growth – 1870 to 1880 ==
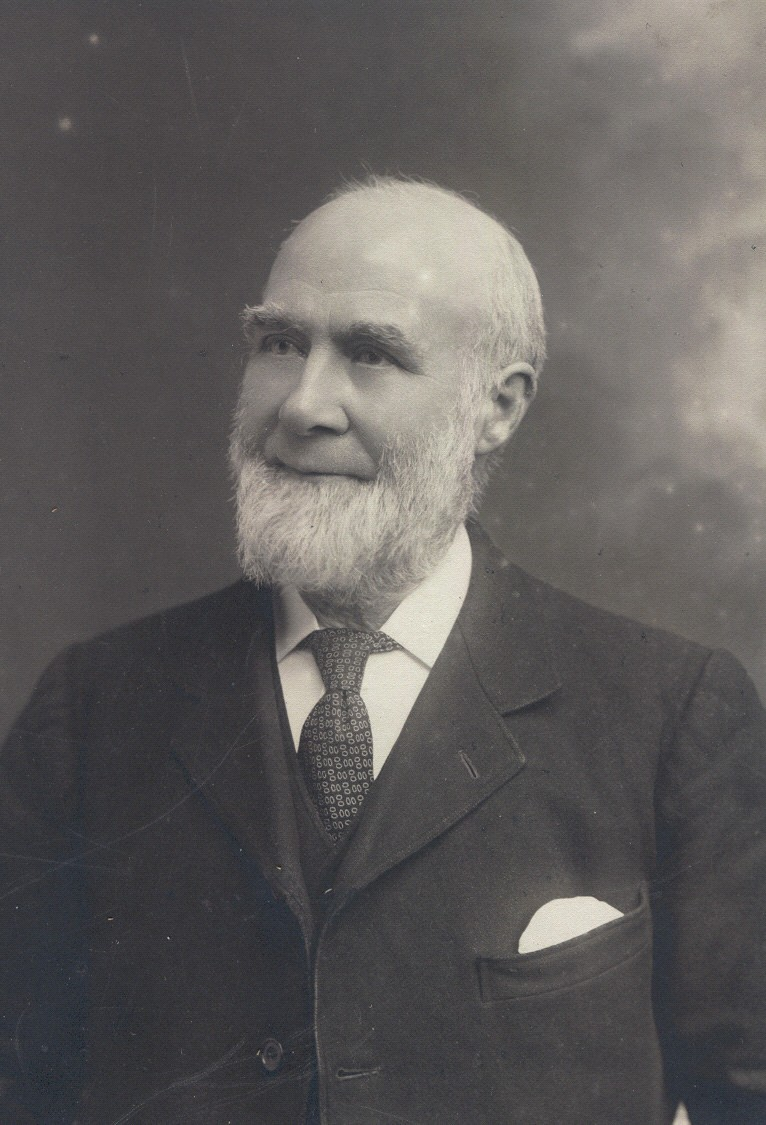
Joseph Wright circa 1910

While the Wright brothers were dividing their time between business and church, their business associates were giving time to other aspects of public work. The Chadderton Board of Health had been formed (rather belatedly) in 1872 following government legislation. One of the first Board members was Joseph Wright's future business partner, Jakeh Travis, who was elected to it for the 1873/4 session. Also elected in that year was John Marland a colliery proprietor. John was the brother of Hannah Wright's husband Jacob Marland. Ten years later, Ralph Bagley would be elected as Chairman of the Committee.

In November 1875, Bagley and Benjemin Wright withdrew from John Marsden and Company to enable them to concentrate on their partnership with Samuel Milne. However, by 1877, the partnership with Samuel Milne had come to an end, and Bagley and Wright were trading under the name 'Bagley & Wright' from the Wellington and Lees mills with Joseph Wright mill manager at the Wellington. From these mills they manufactured crochet, embroidery, tatting and bonnet cotton as well as sewing thread; the latter being a relatively new introduction to their line. They were also producing fishing-net twine something that they became known and respected over many years. The growth of the company had, up to 1877, been rapid and they now saw a commercial imperative to appear daily (not necessarily personally) at the Manchester Royal Cotton Exchange where the cotton market for Lancashire was based. Here spinners tried to get the best deals for raw cotton from the importers of American cotton while simultaneously getting the highest available price for their yarn from weaving businesses.

While assisting in the development of the Bagley & Wright business, Joseph Wright was developing a business in his own right. Although Wellington Mill was by 1877 an integral part of the Bagley & Wright operations, it also provided the manufacturing base for a separate business called Travis, Freeman & Wright that was owned by Jakeh Travis, Thomas Freeman and Joseph. Like the Wright brothers, Jakeh Travis and Thomas Freeman were devout Wesleyans, so their meeting and partnership was not entirely happenstance. However, whereas Benjamin and Joseph were "new kids on the block", Jakeh was "old money", his family having been involved with the cotton industry from the early 19th century. Indeed, although he was involved in several enterprises, his input was financial rather than active. When he was elected to the Chadderton Board of Health his employment was listed as 'gentleman'; a clear indication that he did not need to work to maintain his income. By 1881, Benjamin's family employed an additional domestic help, a 20-year-old servant called Harriet Mills from Wolverhampton. Having two or more domestic servants was the norm for cotton masters in Oldham at that time.

== Consolidation – 1880 to 1890 ==
Over the period during which Bagley & Wright and Travis & Wright were consolidating the business, house construction struggled to keep abreast of the growth in worker numbers in Oldham. Most houses were in terraces aimed to provide workers with good sanitation and water supply. Although trams served many parts of the town, transport was still essentially by horse and carriage. For this reason, workers’ houses had to be near to the place of work. Both Benjamin and Joseph lived in terraced housing until around 1875; the same sort of housing that would be used by their employees. This was considered normal and only the most affluent of mill owners might be expected to move into houses reflecting their level of income. In 1881, Benjamin was 43 years old and Ann was 40. Living in Ashton-Under-Lyne, they now had three more children; Frank (9-years), Ethel Mary (6-years) and Gertrude.(2-years)

In 1871, Ralph had married and by 1881, he and his wife Betsy had four children; Travis (9-years), Annie (8-years) Clara (3-years) and Elizabeth (3-months).

Competition from other United Kingdom-based spinning companies as well as an increasing flow of imported yarn and finished cloth made it essential to secure supplies of raw cotton and markets for the spun thread. The Company responded to these market pressures by consolidating both the supply and demand side of the operation.

By 1885 the company had established an office in Liverpool so that it had a presence on the Liverpool Cotton Exchange to enable it to buy raw cotton at the lowest price.

In 1886, Bagley & Wright bought out the business and trade mark of Messrs. William Clapperton who were sewing thread manufacturers in Paisley, Scotland. Around this time they also bought into other businesses including the Crooklands Bobbin Mill to secure their supply of bobbins, and a 'spooling mill' in Montreal, Quebec, Canada, to prepare their sewing threads exported for the North American market and thereby avoid large import taxes introduced by the Canadian Government. The spooling mill premises also provided a facility for the storage of finished cloth made at their Wood Top and Cliviger Mills in Burnley.

In the latter half of the 19th century, profit margins in the spinning industry came under increasing pressure. In addition to the growing strength of workers groups like the Operative Cotton Spinners Association, competition from abroad was increasing due to the export of automated textile machinery; something that had been unlawful until 1843. The growth in overseas yarn production also caused shortages in the supply of raw cotton and this raised raw cotton prices, putting further pressure on margins. The Lancashire cotton trade suffered a series of depressions during which the relationship between workers and mill owners became strained. Workers were asked by the Master Cotton Spinners Associations to accept cuts in wages and when these requests were met with militant action by the operative associations the Masters introduced 'lock-outs' that were intended to put financial pressure on the operatives.

In addition to short-term tactics like lock-outs, the Masters concluded that one way of controlling costs and income was to form syndicates with the objective of exerting better control over the market in which they operated. To a certain extent, Bagley & Wright had been at the forefront of this type of strategy by extending their business into the supply side.

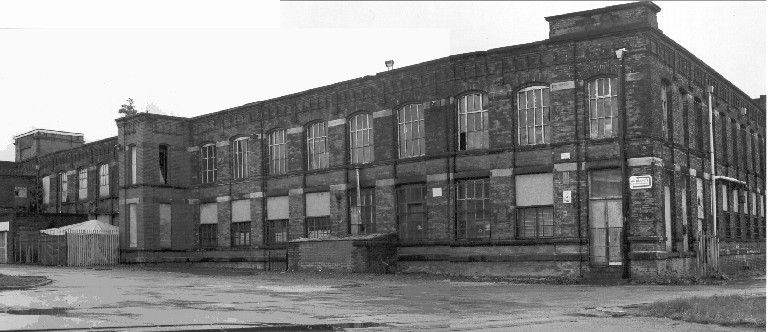
Belgrave Number 1 Mill (photographed in 2006)

Throughout most of their existence, the company had manufactured fishing net twines, cotton yarn of all types (except the very finest threads) and high quality sewing threads. This latter product was especially successful and sales grew strongly during the 1880s. By 1881, the sewing cotton side of the business had grown to such an extent that it had been decided to build a new 'state-of-the-art' mill. The company bought land off Honeywell Lane, Oldham and erected Belgrave Mill which subsequently became known as 'Belgrave Number 1 Mill' as a further three mills were erected on the site in the early part of the 20th century. Yarn produced at the Belgrave Number 1 Mill was bleached or dyed in an on-site facility. Belgrave #1 was designed by the architects Potts, Pickup and Dixon a leading firm of mill architects in Lancashire. No expense was spared, including the fitting of a steam engine built by Woolstenhulmes & Rye.

In addition to the Belgrave Mill, the company now owned Industry Mill, Crabtree Mill and Cliviger Shed in Burnley, as well as the other mills previously mentioned.

By 1889, the company had purchased a weaving mill at Cliviger near Burnley to provide an additional market for their yarns. In 1890 they increased this capacity by renting part of Wood Top Mill (also in Burnley).

The success of the company was reflected in a change of residence for both Benjamin and Ralph. Sometime between 1881 and 1891, Benjamin and Ann moved with their family to recently built houses on Queens Road, overlooking Belgrave #1 Mill across Alexandra Park. This change reflects the family's growing wealth and status within the community. Benjamin's home at number 53 was only a few doors away from number 67 where Ralph and his family had lived until moving to Edward Street, Werneth around 1890. Due to ill-health, Thomas Freeman withdrew from the Travis, Freeman & Wright business in September 1888. The business carried on with the remaining two partners under the title of Travis & Wright.

== Division and conglomeration - 1890 to 1900 ==
By the late 19th century, the company had established a large warehouse and office block on Cannon Street in central Manchester and a second warehouse at the junction of Union Street and Priory Street in Oldham. There were branch offices in Glasgow and Belfast and offices and warehouses in Melbourne, Bombay and Moscow.

In 1890 Bagley & Wright's occupied Wood Top Mill to further complement their weaving capability at Cliviger Mill. On 28 December 1892, a memorandum was written by Ralph Bagley to 'J. Feilding Esq.' Secretary of the Operative Cotton Spinners Association (the spinners’ trade union) informing him that a forthcoming meeting had been cancelled. The heading of the memorandum lists the company's mills as: Wellington, Industry, and Belgrave in Oldham and Wood Top Shed in Burnley. In the archives of Burnley library is a reference written on Bagley & Wright notepaper in 1895 for a Mr. John Watson who “has been in our company for over five years as an overlooker & have always been found him a steady hand & competent workman”. The reference is signed by R. Sagar for Bagley & Wright. In 1895, the company's sewing cotton business was still expanding and a considerable investment was made in the extension of the Belgrave Mill to provide greater manufacturing capacity. In 1895 several British producers of sewing cotton yarn opened discussions on how they might combine their assets and markets to protect themselves from increasing competition from overseas. The companies decided to form a 'conglomerate' through which they would be in a better position to cooperate on the purchase of raw material and the combined marketing of their products. The aim was to cooperate rather than compete.

Around 1893, the company bought a mill at Crooklands to secure the supply of bobbins that they needed. The bobbin mill at Crooklands lay between Milnthorpe and Kendal. The English Lake District was a major centre for the production of bobbins because of the availability of trees to use as the raw material and water courses to drive water wheels to power the machinery. The Crooklands Mill was built some time before it was taken over by Bagley & Wright who certainly owned it between 1894 and 1897. In 1906 the mill had passed into the ownership of Messrs. A. Bell and Co., so it is possible that the mill was retained by Bagley & Wright until after Benjamin's death in 1905.

The Bobbin Mill made use of an old horse-drawn tramway that passed closely by on an embankment. The tramway was originally built to serve a large gunpowder factory at nearby Gatebeck. The factory was owned by Wakefield and Co., one of the largest manufacturers of gunpowder in Great Britain in the 19th century. The tramway had horses pulling wagons of gunpowder from the factory to a wharf on the Lancaster Canal where it was dispatched to mines or to the military. The horses were shod in copper shoes so that sparks would not ignite the gunpowder. Before 1900, the tramway had been extended from the canal wharf to Milnthorpe where there was, by then, a railway station.

In 1867, the Crooklands Mill had been powered by a water wheel with a mill stream taken off the nearby Peasey Beck. At this stage, the Mill consisted of about 3 buildings and bobbins must have been transported to the canal by horse and cart. By 1900, a spur line has been built from the tramway, across the Peasey Beck and into an open shed in the Mill grounds. There is evidence that the Mill stabled horses to be used in pulling wagons of bobbins onto the main tramway line and down to the canal or onwards to the station at Milnthorpe.

In 1895 the company's sewing cotton business was still expanding and a considerable investment was made in the extension of the Belgrave #1 Mill to provide greater manufacturing capacity.

In 1897, fourteen companies involved in the spinning of sewing cotton combined to form the 'English Sewing Cotton Company Limited' (ESCC). In all cases, the Directors or Proprietors of each of the individual companies became Directors of ESCC. While some of the individual companies had previously only been involved with the manufacture of sewing cotton, Bagley & Wright had many other interests including yarn for weaving, fishing-net twine, crochet yarn etc. The Bagley & Wright business split into two; one part being subsumed into ESCC with Benjamin and Ralph as Directors, the other part staying independent. In effect, the ESCC was a 'holding company' and each of the fourteen companies within it maintained their own name and style of management.

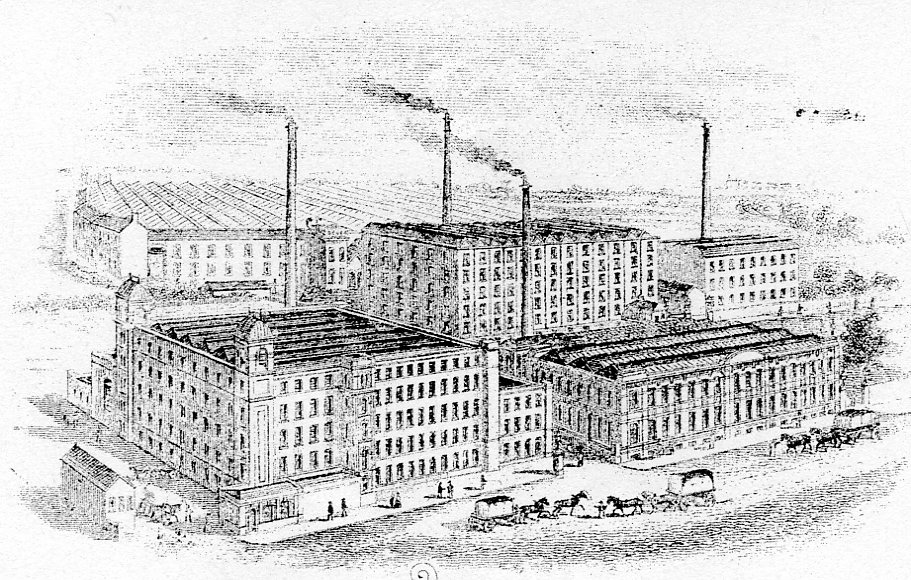
Wellington Mill (Lower Left), Belgrave Number 1 Mill (Lower Right), Industry Mill (Centre) and Wood Top Mill (Far right) from an 1895 Bagley & Wright Memo heading.

The Belgrave #1 Mill was completely turned over to the manufacture of sewing cotton and was the Bagley & Wright 'contribution' to the ESCC. Bagley & Wright's other manufacturing activities were carried out in their other mills. From this point on, there are two listings for Bagley & Wright in the trade directories of the time. As an example, the 1901 Kelly's Directory of Oldham shows the following: (1) Bagley & Wright Limited, cotton manufacturers and doublers, Belgrave Mill, Honeywell Lane. (2) Bagley & Wright Manufacturing Co., cotton spinners and doublers; warehouse, Union Street; Wellington Mill, Wellington Street & Crabtree Mill, Bridge Street, Oldham Edge.

In 1898, the ESCC made a decision to enter the American market by purchasing a number of New England mills in the USA. These acquisitions, including the Willimantic Linen Company were consolidated into the American Thread Company . This purchase and consolidation was to have serious consequences for ESCC by 1902.

Other than for the observation that Benjamin's sons had stayed at school longer than was the norm for less affluent families, the jobs that they took up after leaving school were relatively menial. In 1881, at the age of 18, his son Herbert had been a clerk within the Bagley & Wright business. Ten years later, in 1891, sons George Harrop Wright (21) and Frank Wright (18) were bookkeepers. Perhaps the greatest deviation from the 'work from the bottom' idea was that the sons did not have to experience the manual jobs of piecing and spinning. Clearly, the aim was to provide the sons with experience of various positions within the business to prepare them for future ownership. Because the business was so extensive, other family members could also be brought in and groomed for future management. Thus, Henry, the eldest son of Benjamin's brother Joseph, was a clerk at Wellington mill in 1891 while his father was the proprietor of Travis & Wright at the same mill. By 1901, Joseph's second son Benjamin (we will call him 'Benjamin junior' to identify him from his Uncle Benjamin) was a warehouseman at Bagley & Wright's Union Street warehouse.

== Division – 1900 to 1910 ==
The ESCC operation hit stormy waters early in the 20th century. The investment that the company had to commit in forming the American Thread Company (ATCO) was much larger than originally estimated and returns were slow in materialising. The value of shares in the ESCC dropped sharply. An article in The Guardian newspaper in April 1902 noted that an extraordinary general meeting of the ESCC directors and shareholders was to take place on 23 April. The purposes of the meeting were to (1) discuss the company's position in regard to its management and finances, (2) to enquire into the reasons for the loss of share value and (3) take steps to reorganise the Company Board to protect the company from issues arising from its holding in the American Thread Company. The shareholders were concerned that a large amount of ESCC money had been placed in a reserve fund for the purpose of paying a dividend to shareholders. The problem, from the point of view of most shareholders was that the directors of the mills in the USA that had been bought out to form the ATCO had all been issued with large numbers of ATCO and ESCC shares as part of the consolidation. The effect was that share value had been diluted. Solicitors and accountants working on behalf of the shareholders stated that the use of a reserve fund for the payment of a dividend could be illegal under English law. Prior to this meeting, the ESCC Board consisted of 24 directors, all of whom were directors of the individual companies that had combined to form the holding in 1897 plus several directors of American companies. To improve management efficiency the meeting decided that the Board membership should be reduced to 12 with half of this number being ordinary shareholders unconnected with either the individual ESCC enterprises or the ATCO mills. From this point onwards, neither Ralph Bagley nor Benjamin Wright sat on the ESCC Board although they continued to own substantial share holdings in the ESCC.

From the ESCC's perspective, the collection of firms that formed the basis of their operation was identified as being inefficient. Whenever there was a turndown in the market for sewing thread, the overheads due to running numerous mills, each with its own management and administrative structure, was a liability. By 1905, the company had decided that 'concentration' was required and steps were taken to reduce overheads and improve operating efficiency.

In 1905, the year of Benjamin's death, Ralph Bagley was 66 years old.

The English Sewing Cotton Company's Report of 25 July 1907 listed that the following results of 'concentration' were that (1) A linen thread mill was sold to round off the trust's sphere of business, (2) The production of the Egerton Mill was transferred, the report explaining that the trust 'had sufficient reserve productive capacity at other mills to enable them to deal with the trade conducted at that branch' and (3) The plant of the Belgrave Mill at Oldham was removed, and the site and buildings sold. Finally, 'a further concentration took place by the transfer of the business of R. F. & J. Alexander & Co., carried on at Duke Street, Glasgow, to one of the other branches of that company'. Contemporaneously with this policy of concentration, output was centralised by the connection of the ESCC with Messrs. Coats, and the system of common sales established in 1906 through a newly formed organisation called the Central Thread Agency. The net profits of the ESCC greatly increased following that step, though, for the most part, this was due to improved market conditions. The net trading profit for ESCC, which had been £170,829 in 1904, and only £92,614 in 1905, rose to £254,846 in 1907 and was maintained in 1908 at £251,938 although we have no record of the capital deployed.

Oldham Family Records and Archives have records of those eligible for jury service around the turn of the 19th century. The records provide an interesting insight into the wealth of the people on the list because it gives the amount of money for which each person has been assessed to contribute to the Poor Rate of the Borough. Jurors had to be property owners because this was seen as a measure of responsibility. The entries for Ralph Bagley, Benjamin Wright and George Harrop Wright in 1903 show that Ralph Bagley carried a Poor Rate assessment of £420 while Banjamin Wright was assessed at £276. Both were identified as 'Special Jurors'.

Being defined as a 'Special Juror' depended entirely on the amount that had been assessed for Poor Rate and this, in turn, depended on the wealth of the individual measured by the value of the property that they inhabited. In 19th century England and for several decades after the end of Victoria's reign, an Englishman of wealth and standing could, if required to defend him/her-self in a court of law, request that the jury was constituted from peers on the grounds that they would not be adversely prejudiced. Special Jurors were those who might be called upon to stand as jurors at such a trial. It was not until 1949 that this privilege of the wealthy and landed gentry was repealed. .

Benjamin Wright died on 5 May 1905 at home on Queen's Street, Oldham. As befitting his status within the town, his funeral was in the finest Victorian tradition. A description of the cortege in the Oldham Chronicle on 9 May described the scene. After noting that the interment was at Green Acres cemetery in Oldham, the article lists the occupants of the nine carriages each 'drawn by two bay horses'. In addition to his widow and seventeen members of his close family, the cortege included Ralph Bagley and his wife, representatives of Trinity Wesleyan Church and major cotton industrialists from the town.

In his will, Benjamin left a net estate of £33,557 (over £13.28 m as a 2006 value using the average earnings indicator as the comparator. ) His will detailed his wishes that his private and business assets be formed into a trust for the benefit of his children and grand children. His widow and eldest son Herbert were trustees and Herbert was to take over the running of the Bagley & Wright Manufacturing partnership in place of his father.

Jakeh Travis died in 1907 and the Travis & Wright business was formally dissolved in January 1908. Two years later, after the death of his wife, Joseph Wright retired. He was to live another 20 years.

== Closure - 1910 onwards ==
After the sale of Belgrave Number 1 Mill by ESCC, the new owners built three new mills on the site. These were erected in 1907, 1910, and 1914 respectively. Number 3 Mill was the first in Oldham to be powered entirely by electricity.

In 1919, Herbert Wright re-formed and consolidated the independent (non-ESCC) Bagley & Wright Manufacturing operation into a Limited Company (Bagley & Wright Manufacturing Company (1919) Limited). In 1924 this company was dissolved and the assets sold. Herbert died on 10 October 1934 leaving net personal assets of ££27,509 (£5.08M in 2006).

In 1927, Bagley & Wright Limited (the ESCC business) was still being quoted on the Oldham Stock Exchange. At this time, the business had 200,000 £1 shares that were valued at 14 shillings and 9 pence. Its capital value was £151,753 and 'loan owner' claims stood at £123,568. Liabilities were £56,918 and the profit and loss account showed a deficit of £86,512.

== See also ==
- History of Oldham
- Platt Brothers
- Glodwick
