= Manchester cotton warehouses =

Buildings in Manchester, England

In the final half of the 19th century Manchester's reputation as a financial and commercial centre was boosted by the unprecedented number of warehouses erected in the city centre. In 1806 there were just over 1,000 but by 1815 this had almost doubled to 1,819. Manchester was dubbed "warehouse city". The earliest were built around King Street although by 1850 warehouses had spread to Portland Street and later to Whitworth Street. They are direct descendants of the canal warehouses of Castlefield.

== Function ==
In the mid-19th century, warehouses were mostly built of brick with sandstone dressings and steps to the front door. They were five or six storeys tall with basements housing hydraulic presses, had wooden floors supported on cast iron columns and at the rear of the building was a loading bay with hydraulic cranes. Fireproof construction was used at the end of the century and into the next. The most successful traders built their own warehouses and many speculative developments offered suites and offices for those who needed smaller premises. Warehouses for the home market in ready-made clothing, haberdashery and fancy goods attracted retailers who visited them to view the goods and make orders. Shipping warehouses, receiving and storing and packing goods for export, multiplied after 1815.

Many early-20th-century warehouses were built to a common design with steps to a raised ground floor with a showroom and offices, and the first floor contained more offices and waiting rooms for clients all decorated to impress customers. The working areas above were plain with large windows to allow in natural light. Orders were packed there and sent to the basement on hoists powered by Manchester's hydraulic power system and packed into bales using hydraulic presses before dispatch. The warehouses were lit by gas.

Warehouses were a dominant part of the urban landscape in the 19th century and continued to be through the 20th century; the buildings remained when their original use had changed. There were several types of cotton warehouse.

=== Display of goods for sale ===
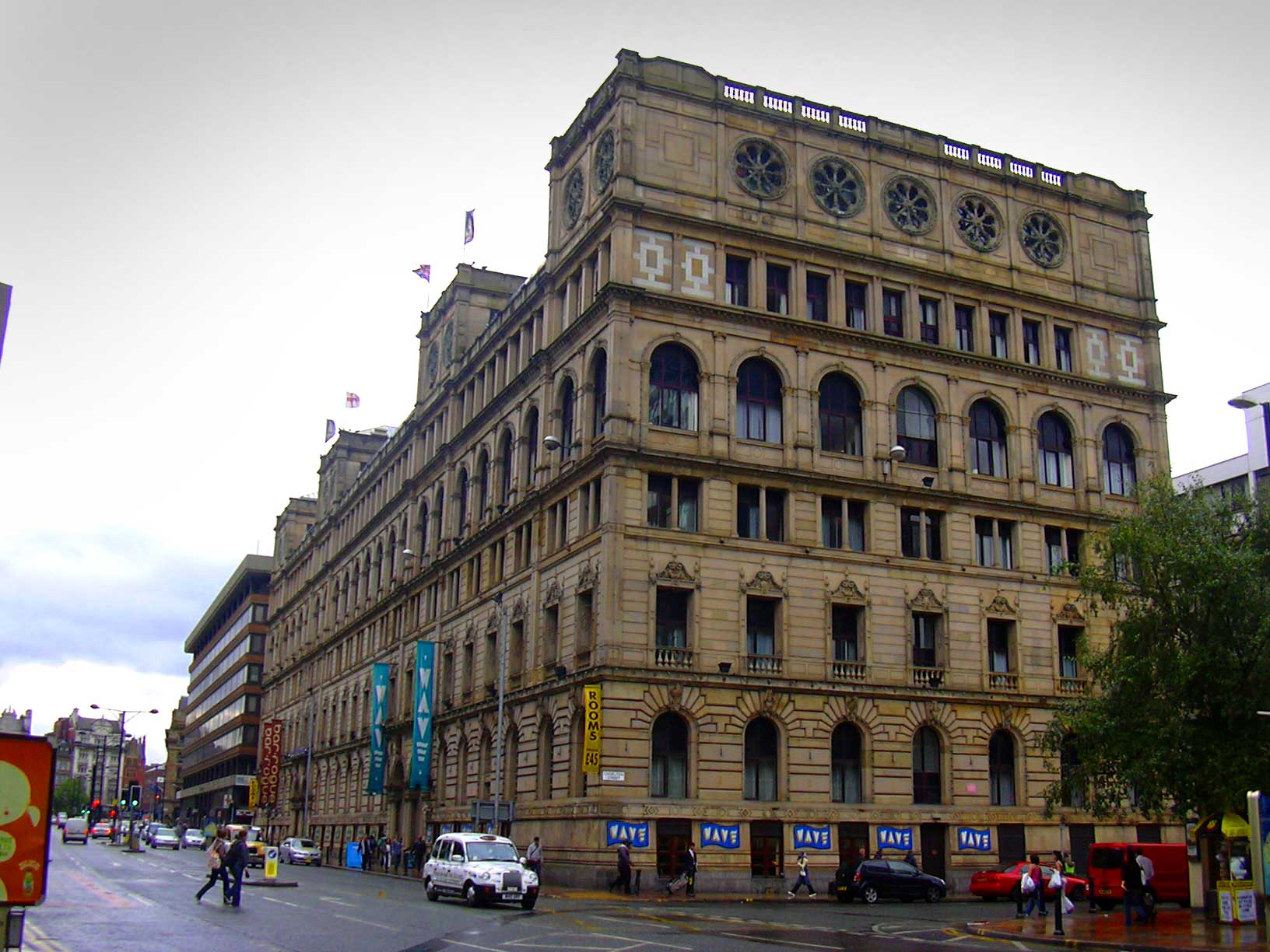
Watts Warehouse, Portland Street

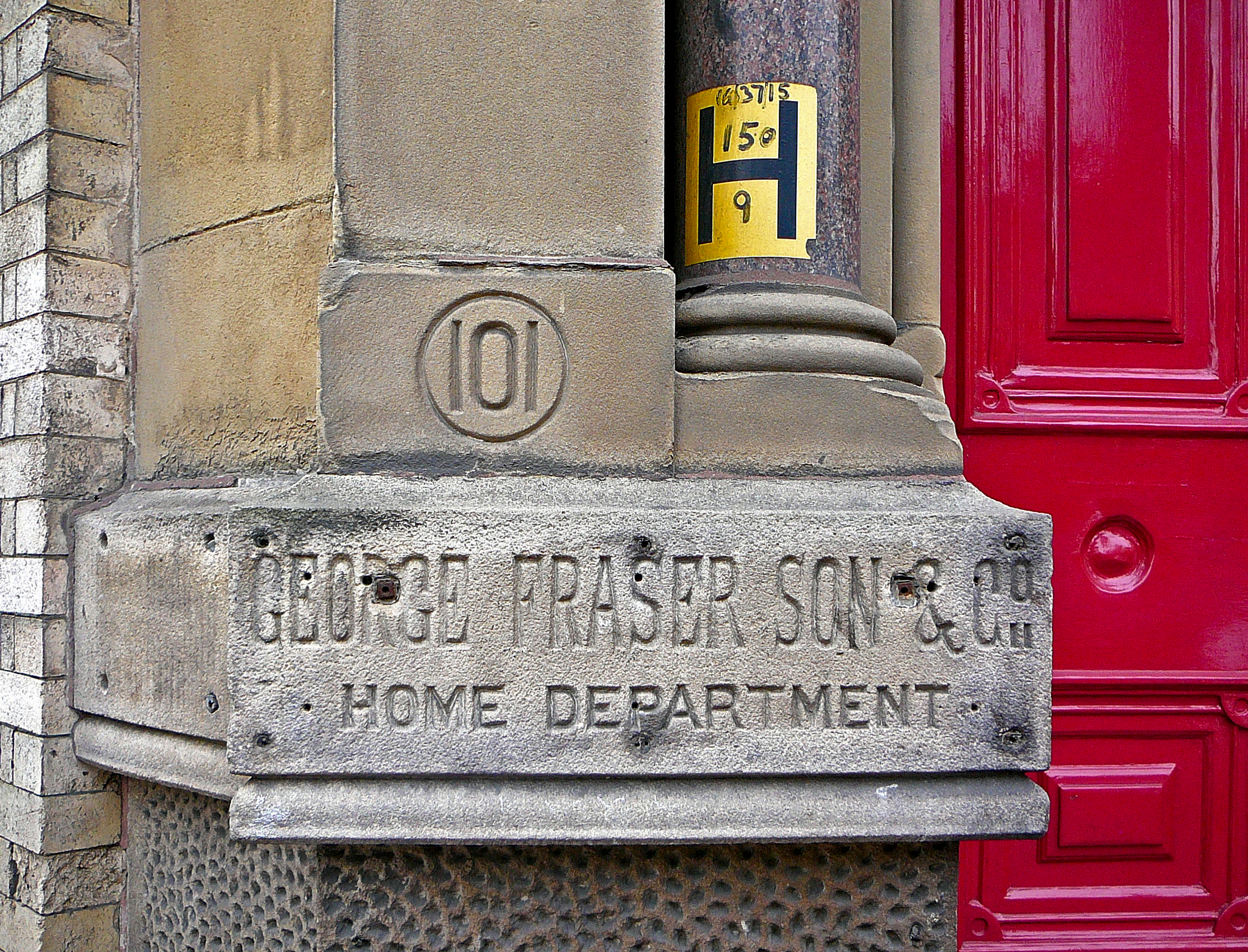
The entrance to 101 Portland Street

Some warehouses displayed finished goods for the home trade such as fashion items. Their street frontages were impressive and some were built in the style of Italianate palazzos. Richard Cobden's warehouse in Mosley Street was the first to use the palazzo style. There were seven warehouses on Portland Street when the elaborate Watts Warehouse of 1855 was begun, and four more were opened before it was finished.

=== Overseas warehouses ===
Overseas warehouses were the meeting places for overseas wholesale buyers where printed and plain cloth was discussed and ordered. Trade in cloth was conducted by merchants of many nationalities. The 1851 census showed 1000 persons of German birth in the city, and in 1871 there were 150 German business houses. Behrens Warehouse was built for Louis Behrens & Son by P Nunn in 1860. It is a four-storey predominantly red-brick building with 23 bays along Portland Street and nine on Oxford Street. The Behrens family were prominent in the banking and social life of the city's German community.

=== Packing warehouses ===
The main purpose of a packing warehouse was picking, checking, labelling and packing goods for export. The packing warehouses Asia House, India House and Velvet House on Whitworth Street were among the tallest buildings of their time.

=== Railway warehouses ===
Manchester became a railway hub, and goods for the home market and export left the city by train. Warehouses were built close to the major stations. The first was opposite the passenger platform at the terminus of the Liverpool and Manchester Railway. There was an important group of warehouses around London Road station (now Piccadilly). The London Warehouse at Piccadilly was one of four built by the Manchester, Sheffield and Lincolnshire Railway in about 1865 to service its station. The warehouse was also linked to a branch of the Ashton Canal. It was built of brick with stone detailing and had cast-iron columns with wrought-iron beams. Three warehouses have been demolished, but one that was used as a car park was restored as residential units. In the 1890s the Great Northern Railway Company’s warehouse, the last major railway warehouse to be built, was completed on Deansgate.

== Heritage ==
The square mile of "warehouse city" has been described as the finest example of a Victorian commercial centre in the United Kingdom. The area was a core component for listing Manchester and Salford on a tentative list of UNESCO World Heritage Sites.

== See also ==
- List of warehouses in Manchester

== Bibliography ==
- Hartwell, Clare (2001). Manchester. Pevsner Architectural Guides. London: Penguin Books. ISBN 0-14-071131-7.
- Parkinson-Bailey, John J. (2000). Manchester: an Architectural History. Manchester: Manchester University Press. ISBN 0-7190-5606-3.
