= Bridgewater House, Manchester =

Listed former warehouse in Manchester, England

Bridgewater House
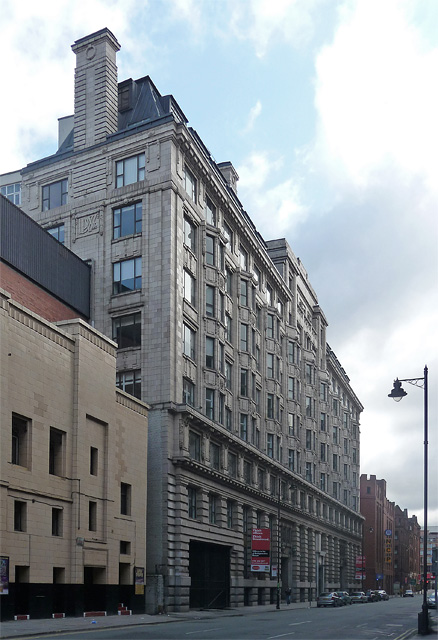
- Bridgewater House, Whitworth Street, Manchester
- Interactive map of the Bridgewater House area

General information
- Location: 58–60 Whitworth Street, Manchester, M1 6LT
- Coordinates: 53.47530°N 2.23925°W
- Year built: 1912

Technical details
- Material: Sandstone ashlar and white glazed terracotta
- Floor count: 9 (incl. basement)

Design and construction
- Architect: Harry S. Fairhurst
- Designations

Listed Building – Grade II
- Official name: Bridgewater House
- Designated: 6 June 1994
- Reference no.: 1270606

Bridgewater House is a former packing and shipping warehouse at 58–60 Whitworth Street, Manchester, England. It is recorded in the National Heritage List for England as a designated Grade II listed building.

== History ==
=== 20th century ===
Bridgewater House was built as a shipping warehouse in 1912 to a design by Harry S. Fairhurst. It is built around a steel frame with a cladding of sandstone ashlar and white glazed terracotta in a large rectangular plan, with a loading bay at the rear. The building has eight storeys and a basement and 19 bays. The lower two floors are of stone, and the upper floors are of terracotta. Above the doorways are profile medallions of the Duke of Bridgewater. According to the architectural historian Clare Hartwell, Fairhurst's huge buildings are "steel-framed and built to high-quality fireproof specifications". The builders were J. Gerrard & Sons Ltd of Swinton. The authors of the Buildings of England series state that "Fairhurst's design revolutionised the business of loading and unloading goods and twenty-six lorries could be dealt with simultaneously using a drive-through system".

The building was constructed for Lloyd's Packing Warehouses Limited and, like many warehouses, was built to a common design with steps to a raised ground floor with showroom and offices. The first floor contained more offices, waiting rooms for clients, and sample and pattern rooms all decorated to impress customers. The working areas above were plain with large windows to allow in natural light. Orders were packed there and sent to the basement on hoists powered by Manchester's hydraulic power system and packed into bales using hydraulic presses before dispatch. The warehouse was lighted by gas.

=== 21st century ===
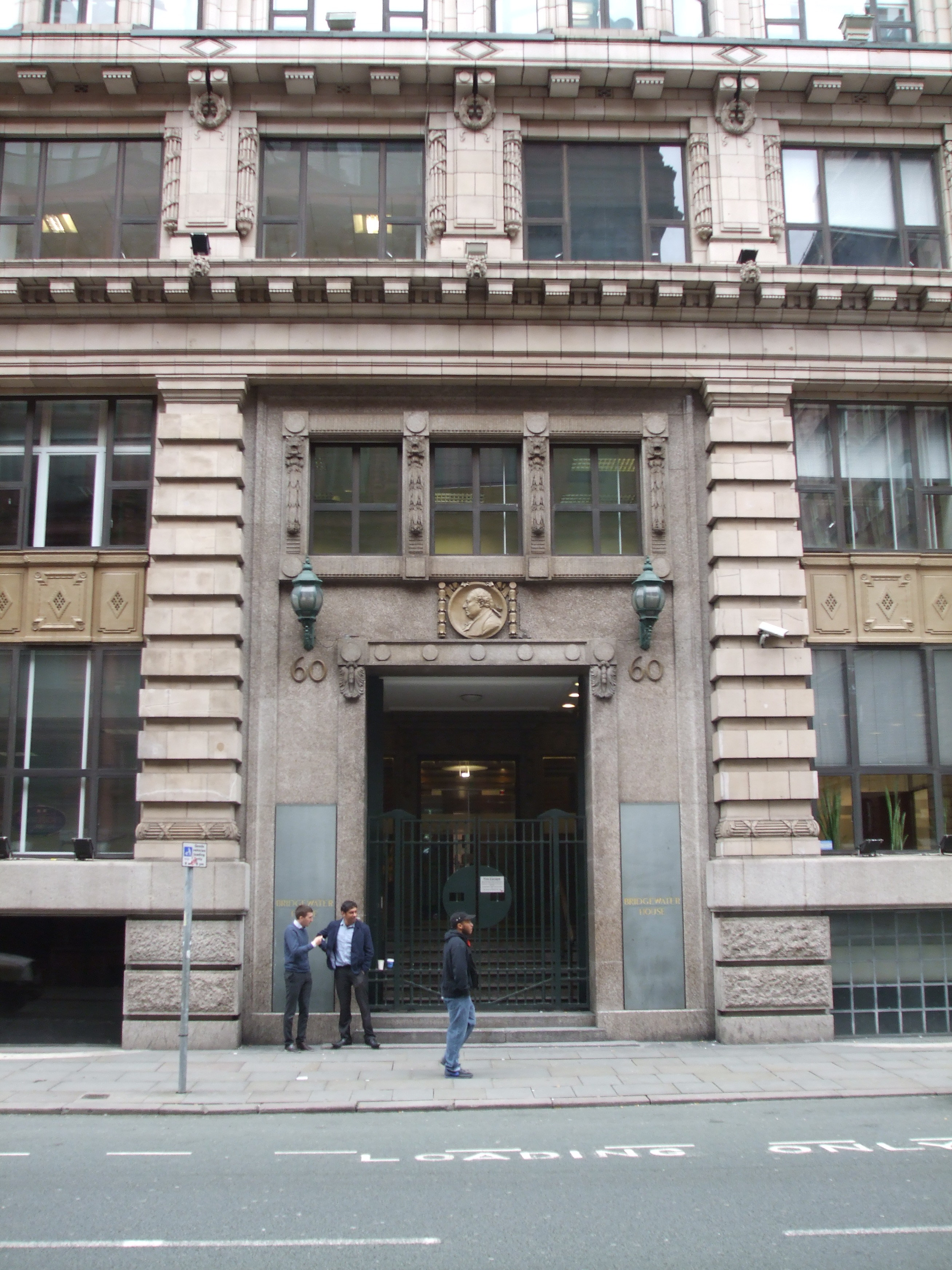
The doorway of Bridgewater House

By 2012, the building had been converted to offices and was owned by Bruntwood. In 2022 Renaker sold Bridgewater House to Watch This Space, a property developer. As of 2023, plans to convert the building into 53 apartments had been submitted to Manchester City Council.

== See also ==
- Listed buildings in Manchester-M1
