= Asia House, Manchester =

Building in Manchester, England

Coordinates: 53.4750°N 2.2381°W

Asia House
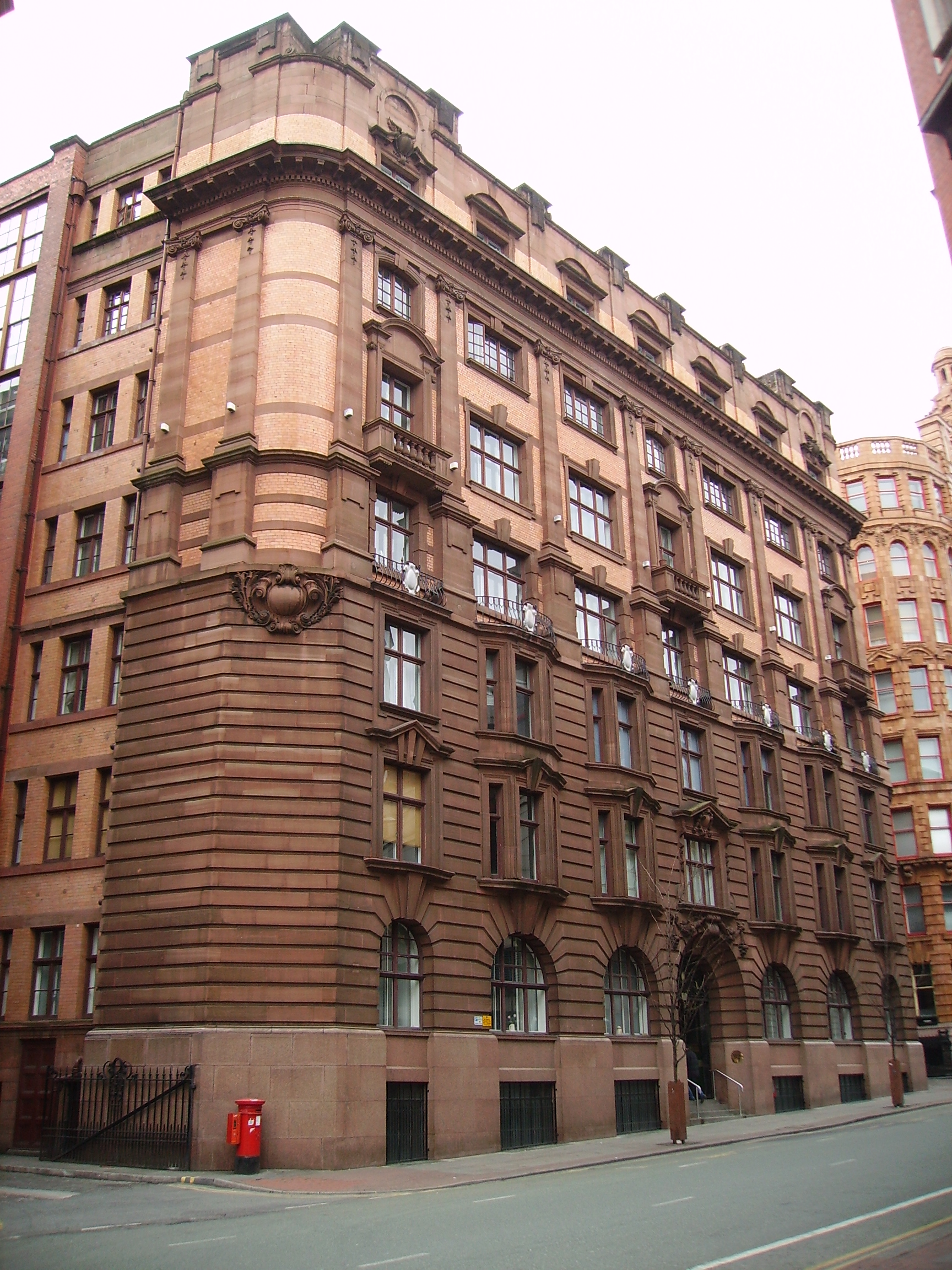
- Asia House, Manchester
- Interactive map of the Asia House area

General information
- Architectural style: Edwardian Baroque
- Location: 82 Princess Street, Manchester, England
- Year built: 1906–09

Design and construction
- Designations

Listed Building – Grade II*
- Official name: Asia House
- Designated: 2 October 1974
- Reference no.: 1247432

Asia House at No. 82 Princess Street, Manchester, England, is an early 20th century packing and shipping warehouse built between 1906 and 1909 in an Edwardian Baroque style. It is a Grade II* listed building as at 3 October 1974. Nikolaus Pevsner's The Buildings of England describes the warehouse, and its companion, No. 86, Manchester House, as "quite splendid ... good examples of the warehouse type designed for multiple occupation by shipping merchants". It attributes its design to I.R.E. Birkett, architect of the Grade II listed companion building, Manchester House, which is similar in design. English Heritage attributes it to Harry S. Fairhurst. Asia House has an "exceptionally rich" entrance hall and stairwell, "lined with veined marble and green and cream faience, with designs of trees and Art Nouveau stained glass".

The warehouse was built for the Refuge Assurance Company and in 1910 was occupied by the Oxford Packing Company and 36 shipping merchants. Built on a trapezoidal plan, it has two linked blocks which are six storeys high plus an attic above a double basement. Its façade is pink-brown sandstone, brick and marble while the side elevations, where the service and workers entrances were located, are in glazed white brick and the rear common brick. The warehouse loading bays are between the blocks and were linked to the packing rooms in the basement by shafts.

Many warehouses were built to a common design, often with steps to a raised ground floor with showroom and offices and the first floor contained more offices and waiting rooms for clients and sample and pattern rooms all decorated to impress customers. The working areas above were plain with large windows to allow in natural light. Orders were packed there and sent to the basement on hoists powered by Manchester's hydraulic power system and packed into bales using hydraulic presses before dispatch. The warehouse was lighted by gas.

Asia House was converted for residential use in 2003 and the basement is a car park. Noel Gallagher, singer songwriter with Oasis, is a former occupant.

== See also ==
- Grade II* listed buildings in Greater Manchester
- Listed buildings in Manchester-M1
