= Whitworth Street =

Street in Manchester, England

Coordinates: 53.475°N 2.239°W

Whitworth Street is a street in Manchester, England. It runs between London Road (A6) and Oxford Street (A34). West of Oxford Street it becomes Whitworth Street West, which then goes as far as Deansgate (A56). It was opened in 1899 and is lined with many large and grand warehouses. It is named after the engineer Joseph Whitworth, whose works once stood along the route.

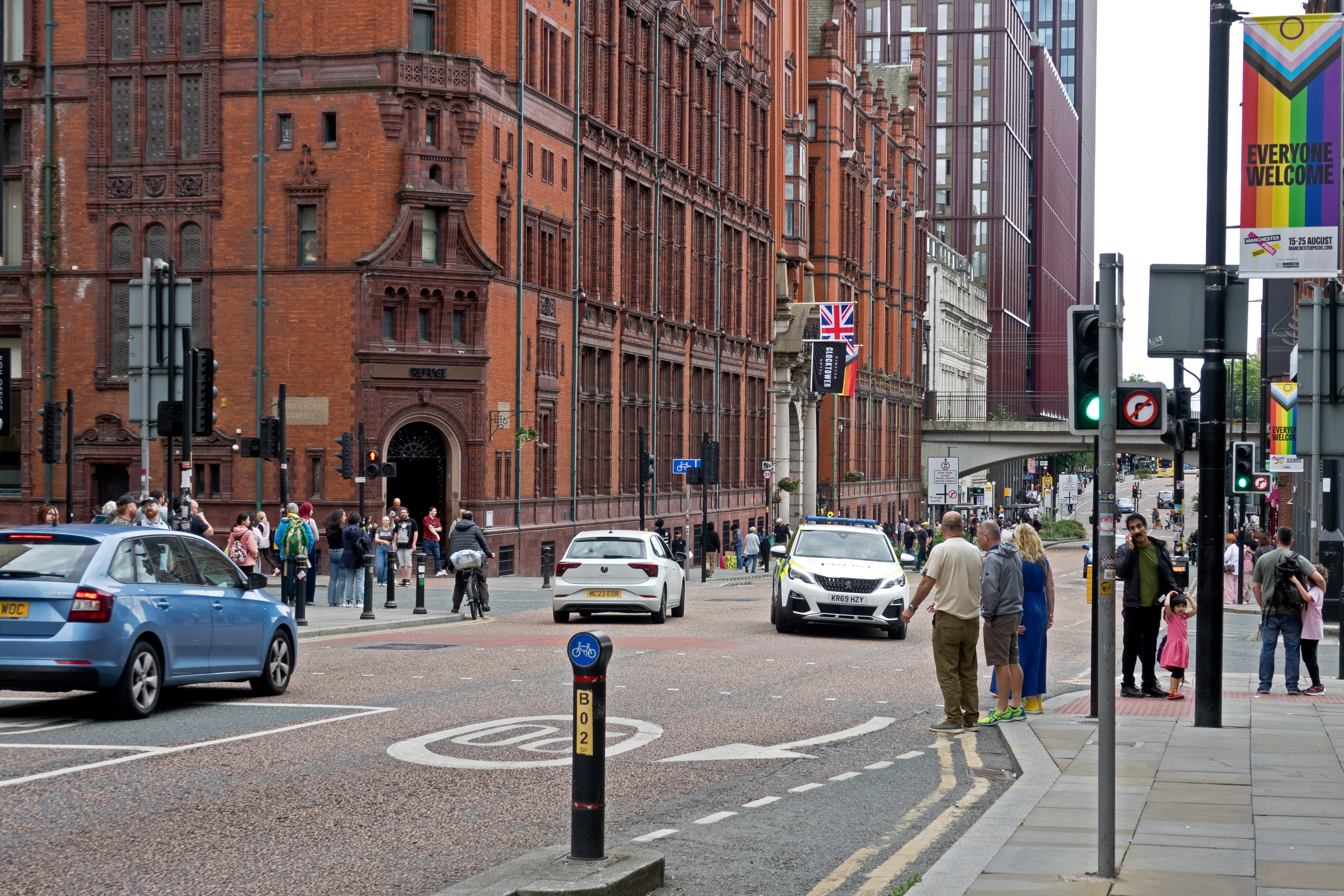
Whitworth Street near to Oxford Street, 2025

Whitworth Street West runs alongside the viaduct connecting Oxford Road and Deansgate railway stations: beyond Albion Street the Rochdale Canal is on the northern side. On the Albion Street corner is the building once occupied by the Haçienda nightclub at nos. 11–13, as well as the Twisted Wheel Club at no. 6, while further west on the opposite side is the Ritz.

Opposite the Sackville Street Building is Sackville Gardens, a public park established in 1900.

== Route ==
The Whitworth Street consists of two segregated parts on either side of its junction with Aytoun Street:

The "main" portion starts from Aytoun Street in the east and leads continuously to Oxford Street in the west. It also forms part of the longer continuous two-way B4649 Road (along with Whitworth Street West in the west and Fairfield Street in the east).

The short eastern stretch starts from London Road (A6) and cuts off at Aytoun Street (A6), and is one-way westbound only. It forms part of the A6 one-way system and is segregated from the "main" B4649 portion (through access only open to pedestrians).

== Notable buildings in Whitworth Street ==
Mainly of the Edwardian period, after the expansion of trade which followed the opening of the ship canal in 1894.

=== Southeast side ===
- The Sackville Street Building, University of Manchester (listed Grade II)
- Lancaster House (listed Grade II*)
- India House (listed Grade II*)
- The Kimpton Clocktower Hotel (listed Grade II*)

=== Northwest side ===
- The Shena Simon Campus of the Manchester College
- Bridgewater House
- London Road Fire Station (Grade II* listed)

== Demolished buildings ==
St Mary's Hospital for Women and Children

St Mary's Hospital for Women and Children was founded in 1790 and from 1855 to 1903 it occupied a building in Quay Street. In 1904 the hospital was amalgamated with the Manchester Southern Hospital for Women and Children and consequently two new hospitals were built. One was in Whitworth Street West on the corner of Oxford Street, while the other was on Oxford Road in Chorlton-on-Medlock. In 1915 the city centre hospital provided maternity and outpatient services and had 56 maternity beds and 50 cots, with accommodation for medical students, midwives and pupil nurses. The suburban hospital provided gynaecological and paediatric services and contained 115 beds.

Hydraulic power station

The Whitworth Street West station of the Manchester Hydraulic Power supply system was opened in 1894 (before the opening of Whitworth Street in 1899). It was located on the banks of the Rochdale Canal, between the canal and Oxford Road railway station, next to St Mary's Hospital. It was the first of the three stations owned by the company to be upgraded to electrical operation, but was little used after 1964, as it held equipment bought from Glasgow, which was only used as a backup. Following the closure of the system at the end of 1972, its contents were sold for scrap and the building was demolished.

== See also ==
- Twisted Wheel Club
