= Listed buildings in Manchester-M3 =

Manchester is a city in Northwest England. The M3 postcode area of the city includes the western part of the city centre. The area contains 80 listed buildings that are recorded in the National Heritage List for England. Of these, five are listed at Grade I, the highest of the three grades, three are at Grade II*, the middle grade, and the others are at Grade II, the lowest grade.

The area contains a large variety of listed buildings. The oldest two originated as collegiate churches, and one became Manchester Cathedral and the other Chetham's Hospital. In the late 18th and early 19th centuries, Manchester grew rapidly as a major centre of the Industrial Revolution, and this was stimulated by the development of the canals and the railways. Parts of the Bridgewater Canal, the Manchester and Salford Junction Canal and the Rochdale Canal pass through the area, and the listed buildings associated with these include a canal basin, a weir, a bridge, locks and a lock keeper's cottage. The first commercial steam passenger railway terminated in the area at Liverpool Road Railway Station. The station and associated bridges and viaducts are listed, as are buildings constructed for the transport of goods, and these buildings, together with former market halls, have been converted to become the Manchester Museum of Science and Industry.

The other listed buildings include houses, churches, shops, former warehouses converted for other uses, offices, hotels and public houses, bridges, viaducts, railway stations, a college, a library, a former postal sorting office, a power station converted into part of a museum, a theatre, three electricity junction boxes, and two telephone kiosks.

== Key ==
Grade	Criteria
I	Buildings of exceptional interest, sometimes considered to be internationally important
II*	Particularly important buildings of more than special interest
II	Buildings of national importance and special interest

== Buildings ==
Name and location	Photograph	Date	Notes	Grade
Chetham's Hospital and wall 53.48655°N 2.24406°W		1422	Originally a collegiate church, after the English Reformation it became a town house, following the Commonwealth it was a charity hospital and library paid for by a bequest from Humphrey Chetham, and in 1969 it was converted into a music school. The building is in sandstone with dressings in gritstone and a stone-slate roof, and is in Perpendicular style. There are two storeys, and the plan consists of a cloistered quadrangle, incorporating a Great Hall, and a long east wing, angled at the end to link to the gatehouse. Running from the southwest corner is a boundary wall about 2 metres (6 ft 7 in) tall with pitched coping.	I
Manchester Cathedral; 53.48528°N 2.24455°W		1422	Originally a collegiate church, the building has been altered and extended a number of times, and since 1847. Restoration work was carried out in 1814, the west tower was largely rebuilt in 1862–68 by J. P. Holden, in 1885–86 the nave arcades were rebuilt by J. S. Crowther, the west porch was added in 1898 by Basil Champneys, who made further additions in 1902, in 1933–34 Percy Worthington carried out further work, and war damage was repaired by Hubert Worthington after the Second World War. The cathedral is built in sandstone and is in Perpendicular style. It consists of a west porch, a west tower, a nave with a clerestory, north and south aisles with chantries, north and south porches, a choir with north and south aisles and chapels, a south chapter house, and an east Lady chapel. External features include embattled parapets and crocketed pinnacles on the tower and the body of the cathedral.	I
The Old Wellington Inn; 53.48469°N 2.24402°W		Mid-16th century (probable)	A house, later a public house, it is timber framed with a stone-slate roof. There are three storeys and three bays, the outer bays gabled. On the ground floor are doorways and 20th-century mullioned and transomed windows. On the middle floor the first bay contains a four-light slightly bowed mullioned window, and in the other bays is a continuous 17-light mullioned window. Each bay on the top floor contains a slightly-bowed four light window. The gables are jettied and contain lattice timber framing.	II
Fragment of Hyde's Cross; 53.48647°N 2.24374°W		1653	The shaft of a cross, it was moved to its present site in the grounds of Chetham's Hospital in 1913. It is in sandstone, and has a two-stage octagonal base with a moulded top, and a shaft that is square at the base and chamfered above. The base is carved with geometrical strap-work, and the top is carved with the date in sunk panels. The cross is mounted on an inscribed 20th-century pedestal.	II
Sinclair's Oyster Bar; 53.48459°N 2.24389°W		Late 17th or early 18th century	A house, later a restaurant, stuccoed and painted in black and white, and with a slate roof. It has a rectangular plan, and is in two parts. Most of the windows are sashes, and some have small panes. The main range has three low storeys and four bays, and the right part is higher with four storeys, a canted corner, and a reversed-slope roof with a prominent bracketed cornice.	II
Bridgewater Canal Basin; 53.47517°N 2.25910°W		c. 1760–1765 (probable)	The canal basin, which is lined by stone blocks, was designed by James Brindley, and branches off the north side of the Bridgewater Canal.	II
Culvert arches and overflow channel 53.47579°N 2.25924°W	—	1765 (probable)	The culverts and overflow channel are part of a system linking the River Medlock and the Bridgewater Canal and were designed by James Brindley. The arches are in sandstone and consist of two segmental arches at an angle, and an overflow channel.	II
The Giant's Basin; 53.47555°N 2.25795°W		1765 (probable)	A weir designed by James Brindley as part of a system linking the River Medlock and the Bridgewater Canal. It is in sandstone, and consists of a circular structure about 10 metres (33 ft) in diameter with a sloped lip.	II
Cobden House; 53.47864°N 2.25209°W		1770s	A town house, later used for other purposes including as a court and as offices, it is in red brick on a stuccoed plinth with a modillioned cornice. There are three storeys and a basement, a symmetrical front of five bays, the middle bay projecting slightly, and seven bays on the left return. The central doorway has pilasters, a frieze and a cornice, the windows in the basement have segmental heads, and the other windows are sashes with flat-arched heads. In the left return are two round-headed stair windows, and at the rear is a full-height polygonal bay window and a Venetian window.	II*
8 and 8A St John Street; 53.47776°N 2.25069°W		Late 18th century	A pair of houses at the end of a terrace in brown brick on a plinth, with a sill band, and a cornice. They are in Georgian style, and have three storeys and cellars, a double depth plan, five bays, and rear extensions. There is a round-headed doorway with a Tuscan doorcase, an open pediment, and a semicircular fanlight. The windows are sashes with flat-arched heads.	II
10 St John Street; 53.47779°N 2.25082°W		Late 18th century	A brown brick house in a terrace, on a plinth, with a plain frieze, and a modillioned cornice. It is in Georgian style, with three storeys and a cellar, a double-depth plan, three bays, and a rear extension. On the right is a doorway with a Tuscan doorcase, an open pediment, and a semicircular fanlight. The windows are sashes with flat-arched heads.	II
11–17 St John Street; 53.47766°N 2.25149°W		Late 18th century	A row of four red brick houses in a terrace, on a plinth, with some sandstone dressings, a sill band, a plain frieze, and a modillioned cornice. They are in Georgian style, and have three storeys and cellars, a double depth plan, a symmetrical front of 14 bays, and rear extensions. Each house has a round-headed doorway with engaged Ionic columns, a Greek key frieze, and a semicircular fanlight. The windows are sashes with flat-arched heads, and those on the middle floor have panelled aprons. At the rear of No. 11 is a curved stair turret.	II
12–16 St John Street; 53.47781°N 2.25104°W		Late 18th century	A row of three red brick houses in a terrace on a plinth, with a modillioned cornice. They are in Georgian style, and have three storeys and cellars, a double depth plan, rear extensions, and each house has three bays. Each house has a Tuscan doorcase, an open pediment, and a semicircular fanlight, and the windows are sashes with flat-arched heads.	II
15A Byrom Street; 53.47811°N 2.25195°W	—	Late 18th century	A red brick house with a slate roof, it has three storeys and a basement, and two bays. There is a two-light oriel window, and the other windows are sashes.	II
18 and 20 St John Street; 53.47788°N 2.25131°W		Late 18th century	A pair of red brick houses in a terrace on a plinth with a cornice. They are in Georgian style, and have three storeys and cellars, a double depth plan, and paired rear extensions. The front is symmetrical and each house has three bays. The doorways are in the centre, they are round-headed, and have Tuscan doorcases, open pediments, and semicircular fanlights. Most of the windows are sashes with flat-arched heads.	II
19 St John Street; 53.47771°N 2.25174°W		Late 18th century	A red brick house in a terrace on a plinth, with some sandstone dressings, a sill band, a plain frieze, and a bracketed cornice. It is in Georgian style, with three storeys and a cellar, a double-depth plan, three bays, and a rear extension. It has a round-headed doorway with a fanlight, and Tuscan doorcase, an open pediment, and a semicircular fanlight. The windows are sashes with flat-arched heads.	II
21–25 St John Street; 53.47775°N 2.25195°W		Late 18th century	A row of three red brick houses at the end of a terrace, on a plinth, with some sandstone dressings, a sill band, a plain frieze, and a modillioned cornice. They are in Georgian style, and have three storeys and cellars, a double depth plan, seven bays, and rear extensions. Each house has a round-headed doorway with engaged Ionic columns, a Greek key frieze, and a semicircular fanlight. The windows are sashes with flat-arched heads, and those on the middle floor have panelled aprons.	II
22 St John Street; 53.47791°N 2.25146°W		Late 18th century	A red brick house in a terrace on a plinth, with a cornice, and in Georgian style. It has three storeys and a cellar, a double-depth plan, three bays, and a rear extension. The windows are sashes with flat-arched heads.	II
24A and 26 St John Street; 53.47795°N 2.25182°W		Late 18th century	A pair of red brick houses in a terrace on a plinth, with a sill band, a plain frieze, and a moulded cornice. They are in Georgian style, and have three storeys and cellars, and seven bays. On the front are two doorways with Tuscan doorcases, open pediments, and semicircular fanlights. The windows are sashes with flat-arched heads, one also has a shaped pediment, and another has a cornice.	II
25–31 Byrom Street and chapel 53.47804°N 2.25193°W	—	Late 18th century	A terrace of four houses in red brick with sandstone dressings, a moulded gutter cornice and a slate roof. They have three storeys and cellars, and each house has two or three bays. The doorways have four-centred arches with clustered shafts rising to pinnacles, and ogival heads with finials, and the windows are sashes. At the rear of No. 31 is a 19th-century disused chapel with gabled ends and coped parapets.	II
28 St John Street; 53.47798°N 2.25196°W		Late 18th century	A red brick house at the end of a terrace, on a plinth, with a sill band, a plain frieze, and a moulded cornice. It is in Georgian style, with three storeys and a cellar, a front of two bays, and five bays on the left return. On the front is a square-headed doorway with a sandstone surround, a rectangular fanlight, and a pediment. Most of the windows are sashes with flat-arched heads, and in the return are oriel windows.	II
Lock No. 92 and Castle Street Bridge; 53.47458°N 2.25573°W		c. 1804	The lock and bridge are on the Rochdale Canal at the entrance to the Castlefield Basin, and are in millstone grit. The bridge consists of a single segmental arch with rusticated voussoirs, a keystone and an arch-band, slab-wall parapets, and a ramp at the northwest corner. The lock is 14 feet (4.3 m) wide, it has wooden gates, and there is an overflow channel with a circular brick-lined shaft.	II
Lock No. 91; 53.47455°N 2.25072°W		1804–05	The lock on the Rochdale Canal is in sandstone and has wooden gates. The chamber is 14 feet (4.3 m) wide, there is a ladder in the centre on the north side, and a curved stone staircase at the lower end.	II
Lock keeper's cottage 53.47463°N 2.25082°W		c. 1805	The lock keeper's cottage is adjacent to Lock No. 91, and has been converted for other purposes. It is in red brick with sandstone dressings, a stone parapet, and a hipped slate roof. There are three storeys and three bays. The middle floor is effectively the ground floor, and contains a round-headed doorway with imposts and a keystone. The windows have flat-arched heads.	II
Former Liverpool Road Railway Station, and Station Master's House; 53.47730°N 2.25850°W		1808	The oldest part is the house on the left, which became the stationmaster's house in 1830 when the station, designed by George Stephenson was built. The house is in brick with a modillioned cornice, and has three storeys, a symmetrical front of three bays, a doorway with a pediment, and sash windows. The booking office is in brick with sandstone facing, it is in Classical style, and has two storeys and four bays. The ground floor is rusticated, there are pilasters on the upper floor, a moulded cornice, and a parapet. There are two doorways, the left doorway for first class passengers being the more elaborate, and the windows are sashes. Beyond this is a range of nine bays in brick, stuccoed on the ground floor, with pilasters, round-headed doorways, and windows, those on the ground floor in segmental-headed blank arches.	I
Blackfriars Bridge; 53.48383°N 2.24790°W		c. 1820	The bridge carries Blackfriars Street on a slope over the River Irwell. It is in stone and cast iron, and consists of three semicircular arches, partly embedded in the river bank. On each side of the central arch are paired Ionic pilasters, the voussoirs have vermiculated rustication, and the outer faces of the parapets are balustraded.	II
29–41 Liverpool Road; 53.47596°N 2.25261°W		c. 1820–1830	A row of seven former workshop houses, later used for other purposes. They are in red brick with slate roofs, and have three storeys, a double-depth plan, and each house has one bay. The ground floor of each house has been altered, on the middle floor the windows have segmental heads with altered glazing, and on the top floor are the remains of workshop windows.	II
Merchants Warehouse; 53.47420°N 2.25613°W		1823	A canal warehouse that has been damaged by fire and converted for other purposes, it is in brown brick with some sandstone dressings, a moulded cornice, a blocking course, and a slate roof. There are four storeys and six bays. On the front are two large shipping holes with a sandstone pier between, loading slots, and small round-headed windows.	II
Two bollards, St John's Passage; 53.47813°N 2.25220°W		Early 19th century	The bollards are in cast iron, and in the shape of cannon barrels. They have bands and rounded tops.	II
Former St Matthew's Sunday School; 53.47634°N 2.25443°W		1827	The former Sunday school, later converted into an office, is in red brick with some sandstone dressings, and is in Gothic style. There are two storeys and a cellar, a symmetrical entrance front of three bays, and five bays along the sides. The entrance front is gabled, and has corner pilasters and a sill band. Two semicircular steps lead up to an arched doorway with a fanlight, above which is an inscribed stone plaque, and in the gable is an oculus. The windows are arched and contain Y-tracery.	II
Railway bridge and viaduct over Water Street; 53.47715°N 2.25938°W		1830	The viaduct, including a bridge over Water Street, was built to carry the line of the original Liverpool and Manchester Railway from the River Irwell towards Liverpool Road station. The viaduct is in red brick, it consists of segmental arches, and includes an animal ramp at right angles; this is in brick with parapets, and has a cobbled deck. The bridge, which is an iron girder bridge, was rebuilt in 1905.	II
River Irwell Railway Bridge; 53.47793°N 2.26002°W		1830	The railway bridge was designed by George Stephenson to carry the line of the original Liverpool and Manchester Railway over the River Irwell and towards Liverpool Road station. It is in rusticated sandstone, and consists of two segmental arches with voussoirs, a central cutwater, pilaster strips, a plain cornice, and a parapet with flat coping.	I
123 Liverpool Road; 53.47692°N 2.25777°W		Early to mid-19th century	A red brick house with some sandstone dressings and a slate roof. It has three storeys, a double-depth plan, four bays, and a rear extension. To the right is a round-headed doorway with pilasters, a dentilled cornice and a fanlight. One of the windows has a round head, the others are flat-headed, and all have top-hung casements resembling sashes.	II
125 Liverpool Road; 53.47695°N 2.25794°W	—	Early to mid-19th century	Formerly a hotel, it is in red brick with some sandstone dressings and a slate roof. It is on a corner site, there are three storeys, a double-depth plan, three bays on the front and a four-bay rear wing. In the centre of the front is a round-headed doorway with Tuscan columns, a dentilled cornice and a fanlight. The corner is splayed, and contains a doorway flanked by windows, all with pilasters, a frieze and a dentilled cornice. Most of the other windows are sashes, and there is another round-headed window in the right return.	II
Manchester and Salford Junction Canal Tunnel; 53.47729°N 2.25136°W	—	1839	The tunnel is part of the Manchester and Salford Junction Canal and carried the canal underground. It was designed by John Gilbert junior, it is about 0.27 miles (0.43 km) in length, and is brick-lined with some sandstone. The tunnel is no longer in use, but during World War II it was converted into an air-raid shelter.	II
Victoria Bridge; 53.48490°N 2.24607°W		1839	The bridge carries Victoria Bridge Street over the River Irwell, and is in rusticated sandstone. It consists of a single semi-elliptical arch with rusticated voussoirs, a moulded string course and shallow chamfered copings. In the centre are inscribed panels with ball finials and volutes, and at the ends are pilasters.	II
Victoria and Albert Warehouses and quay 53.47962°N 2.25685°W		c. 1840	A pair of warehouses, later converted into a hotel, and the adjoining quay. The warehouses are in red brick with sandstone dressings and slate roofs. Victoria Warehouse has an L-shaped plan, and Albert Warehouse continues from it along the quayside. There are five storeys, and on the river front are a total of 16 bays. Both warehouses have five-stage loading bays, and the windows are tilting casements with flat-arched heads. Victoria Warehouse has a hipped roof, Albert Warehouse has a stone frieze, a cornice and blocking course, and coped gables. The quay is composed of large stone blocks.	II
24 St John Street; 53.47793°N 2.25159°W		1840s (probable)	A house in a terrace, in stuccoed brick with a sill band, a bracketed cornice a parapet, and a slate roof. There are three storeys, a cellar and an attic, a double-depth plan and a symmetrical front of five bays. The ground floor is rusticated, and has a central segmental-headed doorway, a moulded architrave with a carved keystone cartouche, and a bracketed cornice. All the windows are sashes with segmental heads. On the middle floor the central window has a pediment on consoles, and the other windows have architraves; on the top floor they have simpler architraves with triangular heads.	II
Stephenson Bridge; 53.48718°N 2.24493°W		1844	The bridge was designed by George Stephenson to carry the line of the Manchester and Leeds Railway over the River Irwell and Victoria Street towards Victoria station, and it was widened in 1884. The earlier part consists of two cast iron arches on masonry abutments with brick arches between over the road, then three brick arches linking to the span crossing the river. The later part is a plate girder construction. The earlier part is decorated with iron strips forming lozenges, and the later part has panels, every third one containing a rosette, and with lion heads along the top.	II
Victoria station and rear concourse 53.48719°N 2.24249°W		1844	The station was built for the Liverpool and Manchester Railway and the Manchester and Leeds Railway and designed by Robert Stephenson. It was extended in 1864–65 and then enlarged for the Lancashire and Yorkshire Railway in 1909. The station is built in sandstone with slate roofs, and the train shed is in cast iron with glazed and slate roofs. The original part is in Italianate style with two storeys, seven bays, square-headed doorways and arcaded windows. The later part is in Baroque style, and has four storeys, 31 bays and a rounded corner on the right. The lower two floors are rusticated, there are pilasters on the upper floors, a moulded cornice, and a balustraded parapet. Along the top are four wide segmental open pediments, and in the corner is an upstand containing a clock. Most of the windows are round-headed, and there are also oriel windows and Venetian windows.	II
Power Hall; 53.47684°N 2.25542°W		1855	Originally a railway goods transfer shed, later part of the Museum of Science and Industry. It is in red brick with some sandstone dressings, a brick frieze, a corbel table, a white brick band, a parapet with stone coping, and a slate roof hipped at the ends. It has a single storey and consists of two long parallel ranges with a short north extension at the east end. It contains square-headed wagon entrances, the north front contains segmental-headed entrances, and on the south front is a series of blind round-arched windows. At the west end are offices with arched windows and doorways.	II
Former Congregational Chapel; 53.47423°N 2.25269°W		1858	A Congregational chapel designed by Edward Walters in Italianate style, later used for other purposes. It is in red brick with a slate roof, and consists of a nave, aisles containing porches, a lower storey, and a south tower. The tower is in the form of a campanile, and has pilasters, a prominent cornice, a square stone belfry with round-headed openings, and a short slated spire with lucarnes. The central part of the entrance front has three bays, pilasters, two tiers of round-headed windows with carved imposts, a saw-tooth band, a bracketed cornice, and a pediment containing a wheel window. This is flanked by porches with round-headed doorways above which are oculi with wreath surrounds.	II
Middle Bridge; 53.48744°N 2.24505°W		1864	The bridge was built by the Lancashire and Yorkshire Railway to carry its line over Victoria Street and into Victoria station. It is in cast iron and has a single span, with girders crossing between brick and masonry abutments. The sides have parapets, and are decorated with bands of arches, key patterns, raised panels divided by Ionic pilasters, and foliage swags.	II
City Building; 53.48604°N 2.24162°W		1865–1875	A warehouse with shops on the ground floor, and later used for other purposes, it is in sandstone at the front and brick elsewhere, and has a Welsh slate roof. The building is on a corner site with an angled corner, and has a small central courtyard. There are four storeys, and on the ground floor are pilasters with foliated capitals between the shops and cast iron barley-sugar mullions. The windows are sashes; on the first floor they have flat heads and bracketed cornices, on the second floor they have segmental heads, and those on the top floor have round heads. The corner bay has rusticated quoins, a balcony, and at the top is a finial in the form of an oculus. On the roof is a spirelet with a cast iron finial.	II
Mitre Hotel; 53.48470°N 2.24425°W		1867	The hotel is in brick with sandstone facing, and has a slate roof. There is a parallelogram plan, and three storeys with cellars and basements. Over the ground floor is a continuous string course, at the corners are gables with arcaded friezes, above the doorways and windows are hood moulds, most of the windows are sash windows, and between some of them are shafts.	II
Former Grape Street railway bonded warehouse 53.4780°N 2.2566°W	—	1867–68	The warehouse was built by the London and North Western Railway, and during the 20th century was converted and used for various purposes. It is in red brick with detailing in blue engineering brick including quoins, and has a roof of Welsh slate. There are mainly 5½ storeys, with four storeys on the south side, and a rectangular plan, with twelve bays on the north and south fronts. In the north front are six loading bays, and on the first floor of the south front are three doors for railway tracks. The windows are multi-pane casements with segmental heads, voussoirs, and keystones.	II
St Mary's Parsonage; 53.48217°N 2.24973°W		1868	A warehouse, later used for other purposes, it is in red brick on a stone plinth, with sandstone dressings, sill bands, a bracketed cornice, and a slate Mansard roof. The building is in Venetian Gothic style, on an island site, with a trapezoidal plan, three storeys, a basement, and an added attic, and six bays. On the ground floor is an arcade of round-headed arches with decorated voussoirs, containing a doorway and sash windows. These have linked imposts, roundels in the spandrels, and a Lombard frieze above. The windows on the middle floor have segmental heads, and on the top floor they have round heads.	II
Barton's Building including Barton Arcade; 53.4826°N 2.2464°W		1871	Block of shops and offices enclosing two shopping arcades; restored in the late 20th century. Constructed in cast iron and glass with sandstone ashlar facing and slate and glass roofs. A large near‑rectangular block arranged around an east–west arcade with an L‑shaped arcade branching from its south side. Four storeys and attic, with a long nine‑bay frontage to Deansgate marked by a balustraded balcony dividing the elevation horizontally.	II*
Railway viaduct 53.47763°N 2.25923°W	—	Late 19th century	Two bridges carried the railway line over the River Irwell and Water Street towards the Lower Byrom Street Warehouse. They are carried by girders on cylindrical iron piers over the river and the street, and between them is a brick viaduct with segmental-headed arches.	II
Sawyers Arms public house 53.48077°N 2.24827°W		Late 19th century	The public house is in stuccoed brick with dressings in glazed terracotta and a slate roof. It is on a corner site, with three storeys and cellars, and has a total of ten bays curving round the corner. On the ground floor are pilasters and above is a dentilled frieze, all decorated with deep red glazed terracotta. On the upper floors are raised bands, sash windows in moulded architraves, some with pediments, and a pair of balustraded balconies.	II
St John's College of Further Education; 53.47840°N 2.25431°W		Late 19th century	The college is in stock brick with dressings in red brick and sandstone. It has a T-shaped plan with a main block parallel to the street and a rear wing. There are three storeys and a symmetrical front of five bays, with pilasters, a cornice, and a parapet containing an upstand with an oculus under an open pediment. The windows are casements, with square heads on the ground and top floors, and segmental heads on the middle floor.	II
Air and Space Hall, Museum of Science and Industry; 53.47659°N 2.25356°W		1876	Originally Lower Campfield Market, and later part of a museum, it is in cast iron and wood, and has a roof of slate and glass. It has a rectangular plan, with two storeys and a front of nine bays. In the centre is a tall segmental-arched doorway above which is a gable with a finial.	II
Southeast wing, Chetham's Hospital; 53.48618°N 2.24327°W		1876–77	Originally a grammar school, it was designed by Alfred Waterhouse, and is in Tudor style. The building is in red brick with sandstone dressings, a stone basement, bands between the floors, and an embattled parapet with corner pinnacles. There are three storeys and eight bays, the second bay projecting forward and forming a four-storey gate tower. On the main part the ground floor contains two-light windows with segmental-pointed heads, and above are two-light sash windows. The gate tower has a doorway with a moulded surround and a segmental-pointed head, and above is a small rose window, then a tiered two-storey canted oriel window, a mullioned five-light window, a cornice with a corbel table, an embattled parapet with a central upstand, and an octagonal turret on the left.	II
Hayward's Building; 53.48297°N 2.24673°W		1877	A shop with offices above, in ashlar stone, with four storeys, and 3½ bays, the half bay on the left slightly projecting. The other bays have giant pilasters, a dentilled frieze, and there are panels between the first and second floors. At the top is a decorative frieze, a prominent cornice, and a balustraded parapet. On the ground floor are three elliptical arches, and a round-headed doorway in the left bay, with a balcony above. On the first and second floors are round-headed windows, and on the top floor the windows have segmental heads.	II
Former Market Hall; 53.47612°N 2.25170°W		1878	The former Higher Campfield Market is in cast iron and wood, with a roof of corrugated sheet and glass. It has a square plan with cruciform intersecting naves with aisles in the angles. It has two storeys and five bays. The middle bay has a segmental-arched doorway, above which is a gable.	II
Former Lower Byrom Street Warehouse; 53.47731°N 2.25507°W		1880	A former railway goods warehouse, later part of the Museum of Science and Industry, it is in red brick with a plinth and dressings in blue brick, some sandstone dressings, and a roof of slate and glass. It has three storeys and a basement, and seven gabled bays on the south front. The windows have segmental heads, stone imposts, and blue brick keystones, and contain small-pane glazing. On the ground floor are three large segmental-headed wagon entrances, a two-stage loading slot, and in the west front are two large square train entrances.	II
Castlefield Railway Viaduct; 53.47468°N 2.24919°W		c. 1880	The railway viaduct runs from G Mex to Dawson Street. It is mainly in red brick with segmental arches and piers with embattled parapets. Towards the west end it is in cast iron and consists of drum piers with square towers carrying a metal lattice. Over Dawson Street is a bridge in blue brick, and there are skew bridges over other roadways and over the River Medlock.	II
Castlefield Information Centre; 53.47594°N 2.25128°W		1882	Originally a library, later used for other purposes, it is in red brick with sandstone dressings and a slate roof, and is in Romanesque style. It is on a corner site, with two storeys and a total of seven bays, including the curved corner. On the Deansgate front is a central doorway with a segmental pediment containing carved figures, and at the top is a frieze, a bracketed cornice, and a parapet with a pediment containing a coat of arms. On the upper floor are stepped triple windows with hood moulds.	II
Deansgate Goods Station and attached carriage ramp 53.47732°N 2.24908°W		1885–1896	A former station and a warehouse, built as a rail, road and canal interchange for the Great Northern Railway, and has since been converted for other purposes. It has a steel frame and is clad in red brick with blue brick banding and a slate roof. There is a rectangular plan, five storeys, and sides of 27 and 17 bays. There is a frieze with lettering in white brick on all four fronts, a bracketed cornice, and the windows have segmental heads. On the ground floor are cart entrances, and there are entrances on the first floor formerly for carriages and the railway line. In the west front are tiers of loading bays.	II*
Mynshull's House; 53.48463°N 2.24487°W		1890	A house in red sandstone with some terracotta, in Jacobean style. It has a narrow rectangular plan at right angles to the street, three low storeys and one bay. The ground floor has been altered, and above it is a moulded frieze on carved consoles. The upper floors contain a two-storey bow window with mullioned windows and flanked by paired Ionic pilasters. Between the floors is a cartouche, and at the top is a bowed upstand with terracotta decoration, a lettered frieze and strap-work cresting with obelisk finials. At the sides are lions with shields on pedestals.	II
John Rylands Library, railings, gates and lamp standards 53.48036°N 2.24857°W		1890–1899	The library was designed by Basil Champneys, it was extended by him at the rear in 1912, and is named after the entrepreneur John Rylands. The library is in red sandstone with a rectangular plan, and is in Decorated style with Arts and Crafts features. The entrance front has a two-storey three-bay centre, flanked by two-storey, two-bay wings. In the centre is an arched decorated doorway flanked by two tall windows, and with two small oriel windows above. There is an embattled openwork parapet at the top, and an octagonal lantern on each wing. Behind the front are square towers flanking the reading room. In front of the forecourt are bronze railings, and double gates flanked by lamp standards.	I
North Bridge; 53.48763°N 2.24520°W		1893	The bridge was built by the Lancashire and Yorkshire Railway to carry its line over Victoria Street and into Victoria station. It is in cast iron and has a single span. The sides have parapets, and are decorated with bands of arches, key patterns, raised panels divided by Ionic pilasters, and foliage swags.	II
Parcel Post Office; 53.48772°N 2.24653°W		1894	The sorting office, later a warehouse, is in red brick with details in moulded brick and terracotta, a Welsh slate roof, and a glazed courtyard canopy. It has an irregular plan. The southwest front has three storeys, attics and two basement levels. At the left is an office range with nine bays, to the right the sorting office has 21 bays, and beyond that is a two-storey four-bay range. Features include dentilled eaves, a moulded cornice, terracotta panels with foliage decoration, and coped gables with finials.	II
184 and 186 Deansgate; 53.47922°N 2.24925°W		1896	Built as a pair of government offices, and later used for other purposes, they are in ashlar stone with sill bands, and a modillioned cornice with balustrading at the top and small pediments, one with the Royal Arms. The building has three storeys and a basement, and a front of 18 bays. There are two doorways; the doorway on the left has a voluted pediment on consoles in an arched recess, and the other doorway has coupled pilasters, an entablature, and a blind balustrade. On the ground floor are rusticated pilasters and arched windows with hood moulds, and on the upper floors are sash windows with moulded architraves.	II
Deansgate Station; 53.47435°N 2.25139°W		1896	The entrance to the station, built on the site of an earlier station, is in red brick with dressings in blue brick, terracotta and stone, and has a slate roof. It is on a sharply angled corner site, and has two storeys. There are paired entrances with pointed arches, colonnettes, and mock portcullises. The windows are sashes, and above the first floor corner windows are a dated shield and a lettered scroll. At the top is a machicolated band, and a stepped parapet.	II
Former entrance to Deansgate Goods Station; 53.47798°N 2.24952°W		1899	The entrance to the former Deansgate Goods Station is in red brick with sandstone dressings. It consists of seven bays of arcading with bands, a frieze, and a cornice. The first bay contains a massive segmental arch providing the entrance, which has a tympanum containing lettering. The other six bays have blank arches, with modern shop fronts on the ground floor, and above are tympani containing the destinations of the railway.	II
235–291 Deansgate; 53.47680°N 2.25018°W		c. 1899	A row of shops and offices forming a screen wall to the former Deansgate Goods Station. It is in red brick with sandstone dressings and slate roofs. There is a long range of 29 bays, the four bays at the ends and the four bays in the centre have four storeys, and the rest have two storeys. The range contains cornices, sill bands, impost bands, and pilasters rising to chimneys or finials. There are shops on the ground floor and sash window above.	II
Onward Buildings; 53.47871°N 2.24911°W		1903–04	An office building designed by Charles Henry Heathcote in Baroque style, it is built in red brick with dressings and bands of yellow terracotta, a bracketed cornice, and a hipped slate roof. It is on a corner site, with four storeys, five bays on the front, four on the return, and curved bays on the corners. There is a round-headed doorway with a moulded surround and a decorative keystone, with a balcony above and segmental-headed windows at the sides. On the first and second floors are cross-windows with architraves and keystones, on the top floor are keyed oculi, and on the roof is a flat-roofed dormer. There is lettering on the curved corners.	II
Royal London House; 53.47866°N 2.24963°W		1904	An office block designed by Heathcote in Baroque style, it has a steel frame, sandstone cladding, a ground floor of polished dark brown granite, and a slate roof. There are five storeys and an attic, 15 bays on Deansgate, six bays on Quay Street, and five-bay corner between. There are banded pilasters on the ground and first floors with a frieze above both. On the ground floor are shop fronts and a doorway with a pedimented architrave, on the first floor are cross-windows, and above the doorway the window has blocked semi-columns and an open pediment. On the second and third floors is a segmental-headed arcade with chamfered pilasters, and modillioned cornices with voluted keystones. Over this is a modillioned cornice, and triangular gables with dormers between. The corner rises to an octagonal two-stage turret with a lantern and a domed cupola.	II
National Buildings; 53.48278°N 2.24900°W		1905–1909	Offices designed by Harry S. Fairhurst, later converted into flats, the building has an iron or steel frame, clad in red and buff terracotta and some red brick. There are five storeys, a basement and two attic storeys, and a symmetrical front of nine bays. The outer bays are rusticated and treated as towers with baroque cupolas. The lower two floors of the central part are rusticated and have a cornice, the next three storeys have pilasters, above which is another cornice. On the ground floor are round-headed windows, a wagon entrance on the right and a central doorway with a semicircular pediment enclosing a round window. On the first floor are segmental-headed windows, and above are oriel windows. The fourth-floor windows have Ionic colonnettes, in the lower attic storeys are Diocletian windows, and on the top floor the windows have three lights.	II
Former hydraulic power station 53.48135°N 2.25335°W		1907–1909	Originally a hydraulic power generating station, later part of the People's History Museum, it is in red brick with sandstone dressings, a slate roof, and iron reservoirs, and is in Baroque style. The building is in two and three storeys, and has a central range flanked by aisles, and an accumulator tower to the south. Facing the River Irwell are four oblong windows, above them in the middle is the gabled end of the central range, and flanking this are reservoirs on the roofs of the aisles. At the street end are four bays, a stone plinth, banded pilasters, a moulded cornice, and a parapet forming a gable with an open pediment over the third bay. The front contains a loading door and mullioned and transomed windows of different sizes and with triple keystones.	II
Electricity junction box, Castle Street; 53.47434°N 2.25353°W		Early 20th century	The electricity junction box is in cast iron with a rectangular plan. It has a pyramidal cap with embattled edges above a moulded cornice, with a corbel at each corner. On each longer side is a door with a moulded surround containing a plaque with the city's crest, surrounded by geometric strapwork in relief. The short sides contain the name of the manufacturer in relief.	II
Electricity junction box, Castlefield canal basin (north); 53.47410°N 2.25265°W	—	Early 20th century	The electricity junction box is in cast iron with a rectangular plan. It has a pyramidal cap with embattled edges above a moulded cornice, with a corbel at each corner. On each longer side is a door with a moulded surround containing a plaque with the city's crest, surrounded by geometric strapwork in relief. The short sides contain the name of the manufacturer in relief.	II
Electricity junction box, Castlefield canal basin (south); 53.47377°N 2.25273°W	—	Early 20th century	The electricity junction box is in cast iron with a rectangular plan. It has a pyramidal cap with embattled edges above a moulded cornice, with a corbel at each corner. On each longer side is a door with a moulded surround containing a plaque with the city's crest, surrounded by geometric strapwork in relief. The short sides contain the name of the manufacturer in relief.	II
Opera House; 53.47883°N 2.25137°W		1912	A theatre in stuccoed brick on a plinth, with a slate roof, and in Classical style. The front has three storeys with an attic and a symmetrical front of 13 bays. On the ground floor the middle five bays contain entrances, and above them is a canopy. Above this, the middle five bays contain engaged fluted Ionic columns, the outer of these bays each containing a lettered pedestal and a rosette. The other bays are pilastered and contain windows. Above is an entablature with a lettered frieze and a dentilled cornice, over which is a tympanum containing relief sculpture. At the top is a pedimental gable with a moulded cornice.	II
Arkwright House; 53.48226°N 2.24882°W		1928	Offices designed by Harry S. Fairhurst in Neoclassical style, with a steel frame and cladding in Portland stone. It is on an island stie, with five storeys and two attic storeys, a front of 14 bays and one bay at the ends. The lower two storeys form a podium, above which the three storeys have a row of giant Corinthian pilasters, and over which is a frieze and a dentilled cornice. The ground floor is rusticated and contains an arcade of round-headed windows with stepped voussoirs, and on the first floor are two-light mullioned windows. The lower storey of the attic also contains two-light mullioned windows, and the top storey, which is recessed with simple one-light windows.	II
Masonic Temple; 53.48106°N 2.25015°W	—	1929	The building, designed by Percy Worthington, is in Portland stone. There are three storeys and a symmetrical front of eleven bays, the outer three bays lower and projecting as wings, plus a single-storey extension to the right. The ground floor is rusticated. In the centre, steps lead up to three square-headed doorways with moulded architraves, between which are single-light windows, and above which is a balcony on corbels. The upper floors contain sash windows, those on the top floor with architraves and cornices, and at the top of the building is a decorative parapet. In the outer bays, the two lower floors contain square-headed sash windows, those on the ground floor with voussoirs and keystones, and on the top floor are round-headed windows with corbelled balconies and decorative tympani.	II
Sunlight House; 53.47866°N 2.25040°W		1932	A office building by Joseph Sunlight, it has a steel frame, clad in Portland stone, and a three-tier slate mansard roof. There are ten storeys and four attic storeys, the Quay Street front has eight bays, and the corners are canted rising to turrets. On the ground floor are shop fronts and a round-headed arch. Between the third and the seventh floor is a five-bay pilastrade, over which is a moulded frieze. Above the eighth floor is a decorative cornice, and there is a plain parapet over the tenth floor. The windows are casements. The corners are octagonal and contain mullioned windows, above the tenth floor is a drum, and at the top is a domed lantern and a finial. In the attic are three tiers of dormers.	II
K6 telephone kiosk, Liverpool Road; 53.47587°N 2.25144°W		1935	A K6 type telephone kiosk, designed by Giles Gilbert Scott. Constructed in cast iron with a square plan and a dome, it has three unperforated crowns in the top panels.	II
K6 telephone kiosk, St John Street Chambers; 53.47758°N 2.25015°W		1935	A K6 type telephone kiosk, designed by Giles Gilbert Scott. Constructed in cast iron with a square plan and a dome, it has three unperforated crowns in the top panels.	II
Nos. 98–116 Deansgate (former Kendal Milnes shop); 53.48184°N 2.24773°W		1939	A departmental store with a steel frame and cladding in Portland stone. It has a front of seven bays plus chamfered corners, and there are probably six storeys. The upper floors are cantilevered out over the ground floor. On the upper floors, the bays are divided by pilasters, and within each bay are two full-height mullions, resulting in vertical strips of multi-glazing. At the top is a set-back parapet with metal railings.	II
