= Harriet Stokes =

Harriet Stokes may refer to:

- Harry Stokes (1799–1859), English bricklayer
- Harriet S. Iglehart (1927–2021), American equestrian
