= Sawyers Arms =

Listed pub in Manchester, England

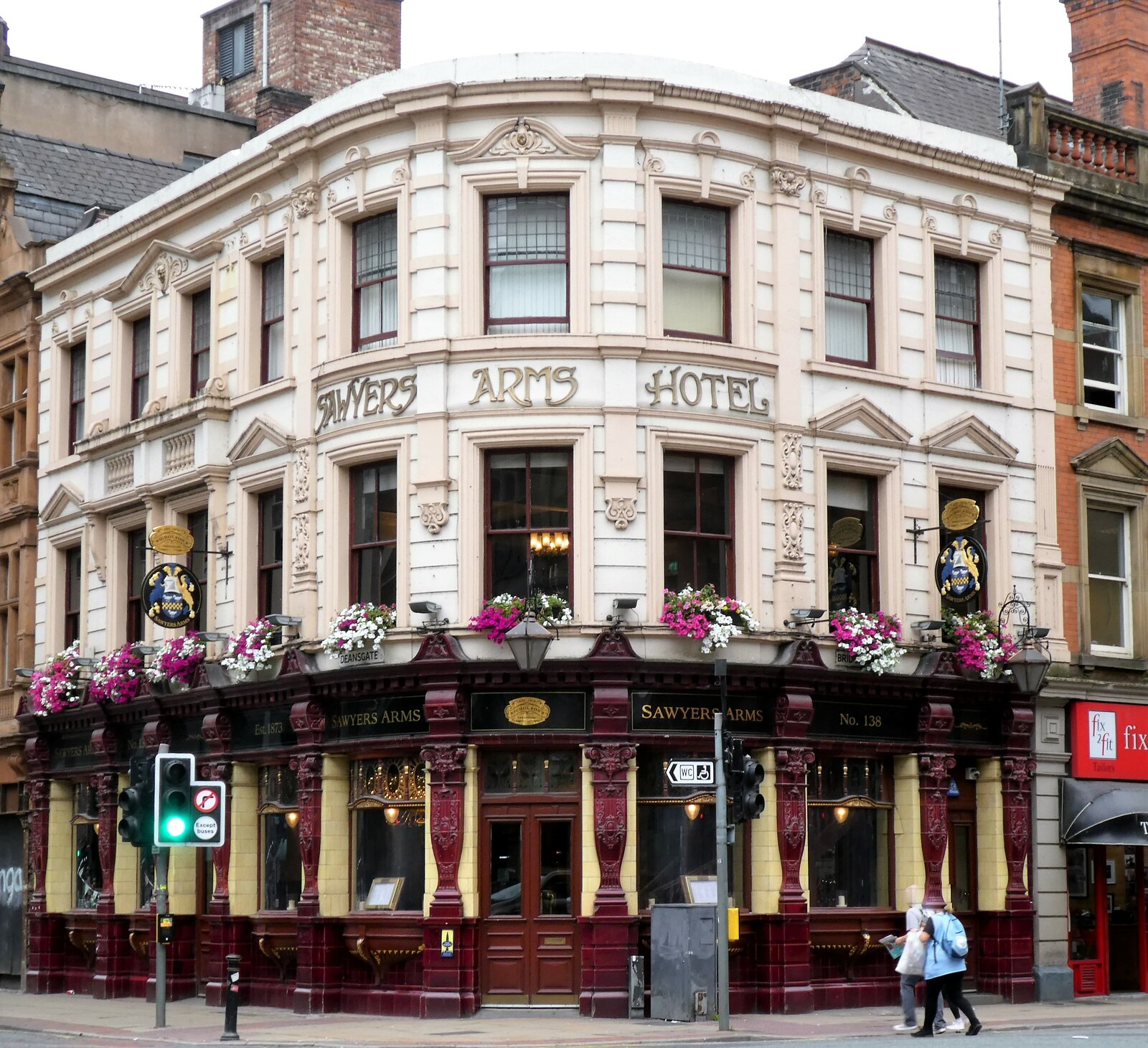
- The pub in 2018
- Alternative names: Sawyer's Arms; Sawyers' Arms; Sawyers Arms Hotel

General information
- Type: Public house
- Location: 138 Deansgate, Manchester, England
- Coordinates: 53.4808°N 2.2483°W
- Year built: Late 19th century
- Renovated: 2014
- Owner: Nicholson's Pubs

Design and construction
- Designations

Listed Building – Grade II
- Official name: Sawyers Arms public house
- Designated: 3 October 1974
- Reference no.: 1282973

Website
- Official website

The Sawyers Arms is a Grade II listed public house on Deansgate in Manchester, England. The present building dates from the late 19th century, but licensed premises have occupied the site since at least the 1730s, leading some sources to describe it as one of the city's oldest surviving pubs. After closing in 1988 and being converted to retail use, it was brought back into operation by Nicholson's Pubs and reopened in 2014 following refurbishment.

== History ==
The present building was constructed in the late 19th century, according to its official listing. Earlier structures on the site housed licensed premises from at least the 1730s, and some secondary sources describe the Sawyers Arms as one of Manchester's oldest pubs on the basis of a long‑established licence recorded in that decade. The pub appears in 18th and 19th‑century trade directories, with successive landlords listed as Deansgate developed into a major commercial thoroughfare. Ordnance Survey town plans indicate that the building occupying the plot was altered or rebuilt during the Victorian period, reflecting wider redevelopment along the street.

On 3 October 1974, the pub was designated a Grade II listed building. The pub closed in 1988 and the ground floor was converted to retail use. It was later brought back into operation by Nicholson's Pubs, reopening in December 2014 following a refurbishment.

== Architecture ==
The building is constructed in brick with stucco and terracotta detailing, topped by a slate roof. It occupies an irregular corner plot at the junction with John Dalton Street, where the elevation curves to follow the street line. The design incorporates a mixture of Victorian stylistic elements, including classical motifs.

It is arranged over three storeys above a cellar, with the façades divided into a series of bays. At ground level, the frontage includes prominent glazed terracotta pilasters and a continuous frieze. The upper floors contain sash windows set within moulded surrounds, some with pediments, and the central windows on the Deansgate side are linked by small balustraded balconies. A cornice and parapet define the roofline, which is hipped and without visible chimneys.

== See also ==
- Listed buildings in Manchester-M3
- Listed pubs in Manchester
