= Sunlight House =

Building in Manchester, England

Coordinates: 53°28′43″N 2°15′02″W

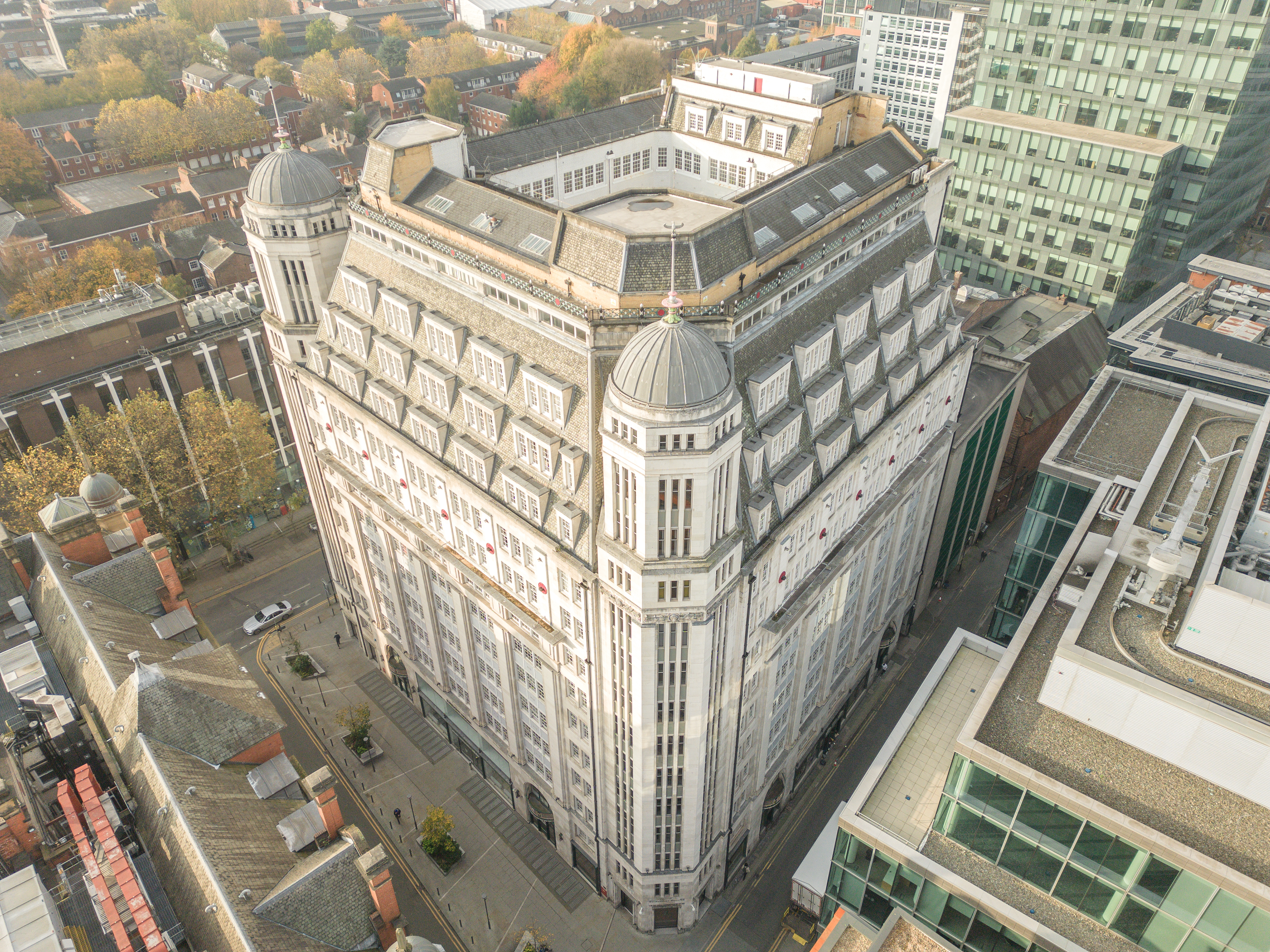
- Sunlight House

General information
- Architectural style: Art Deco
- Location: Quay Street, Manchester, England
- Completed: 1932
- Renovated: 2023
- Owner: Karrev and Kinrise

Height
- Height: 135 ft (41 m)

Technical details
- Floor count: 14

Design and construction
- Architect: Joseph Sunlight
- Other designers: Anomaly Architects
- Designations

Listed Building – Grade II
- Official name: Sunlight House
- Designated: 20 June 1988
- Reference no.: 1270915

Website
- sunlighthouse.co.uk

Sunlight House is a Grade II listed building in the Art Deco style on Quay Street in Manchester, England. Completed in 1932 for Joseph Sunlight, at 14 storeys it was the tallest building in Manchester, and the top floors of turrets and multiple dormer windows and mansard roofs create a distinctive skyline.

== Description ==
Sunlight House is a 14-storey steel and concrete structure, clad in Portland stone. The building is almost square in plan, with three street frontages, and a large central light-well. There is a basement swimming pool below a leadlight domed skylight at first floor in the centre of the lightwell. Each of the three street façades are seven bays, with the two street corners expressed as three sided towers, which each rise to a four level octagonal turret, topped by a domed lantern and finial. Behind and between the turrets, the top four floors are expressed as a mansard roof with multiple setback square dormer windows, which together with the turrets create a distinctive skyline and a major feature in the city.

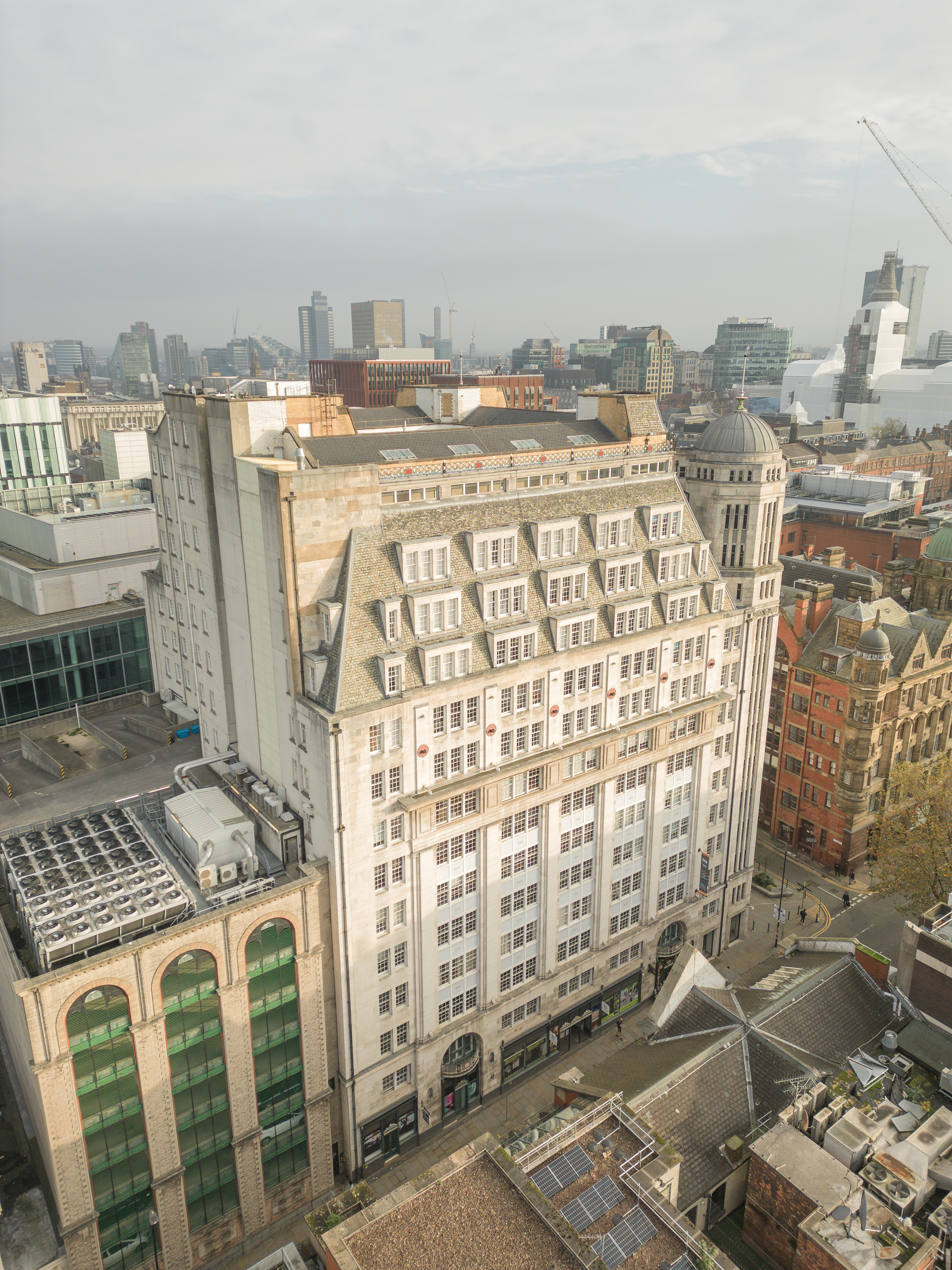
Quay Street façade in 2023.

== History ==
=== 20th century ===
Sunlight House was completed in 1932, at the height of the Great Depression, and was built by architect and developer Joseph Sunlight as the headquarters of his property business, with offices and shops to let. It was originally intended to be 40 storeys high, but this plan was scaled down due to opposition by the city council. On completion, at 14 storeys and 135 feet (41 m), it was the city's tallest building until the 1960s (excluding towers and turrets of other buildings), and claimed to be Northern England's first skyscraper. A 40-storey extension proposed in 1948 was never built.

In June 1988, Sunlight House was designated as a Grade II listed building.

The building was renovated in 1997 when it was found that bolts holding the cladding had rusted through. It now houses offices, shops and a health club. The health club uses the original basement swimming pool.

=== 21st century ===
CIS bought Sunlight House from Gadaricus in 2002 for £27.5 million and sold it in 2005 to Warner Estate Holdings for £40 million. In 2014 it was bought by Scottish Widows Investment Partners' Property Trust for £34.5 million. In 2018 Aberdeen Standard Investments commissioned a £4 million refurbishment of Sunlight House.

In 2022 the building was acquired by Kinrise in a joint venture with real estate fund Karrev for £42 million. In 2023 plans for the refurbishment of Sunlight House were approved by Manchester City Council.

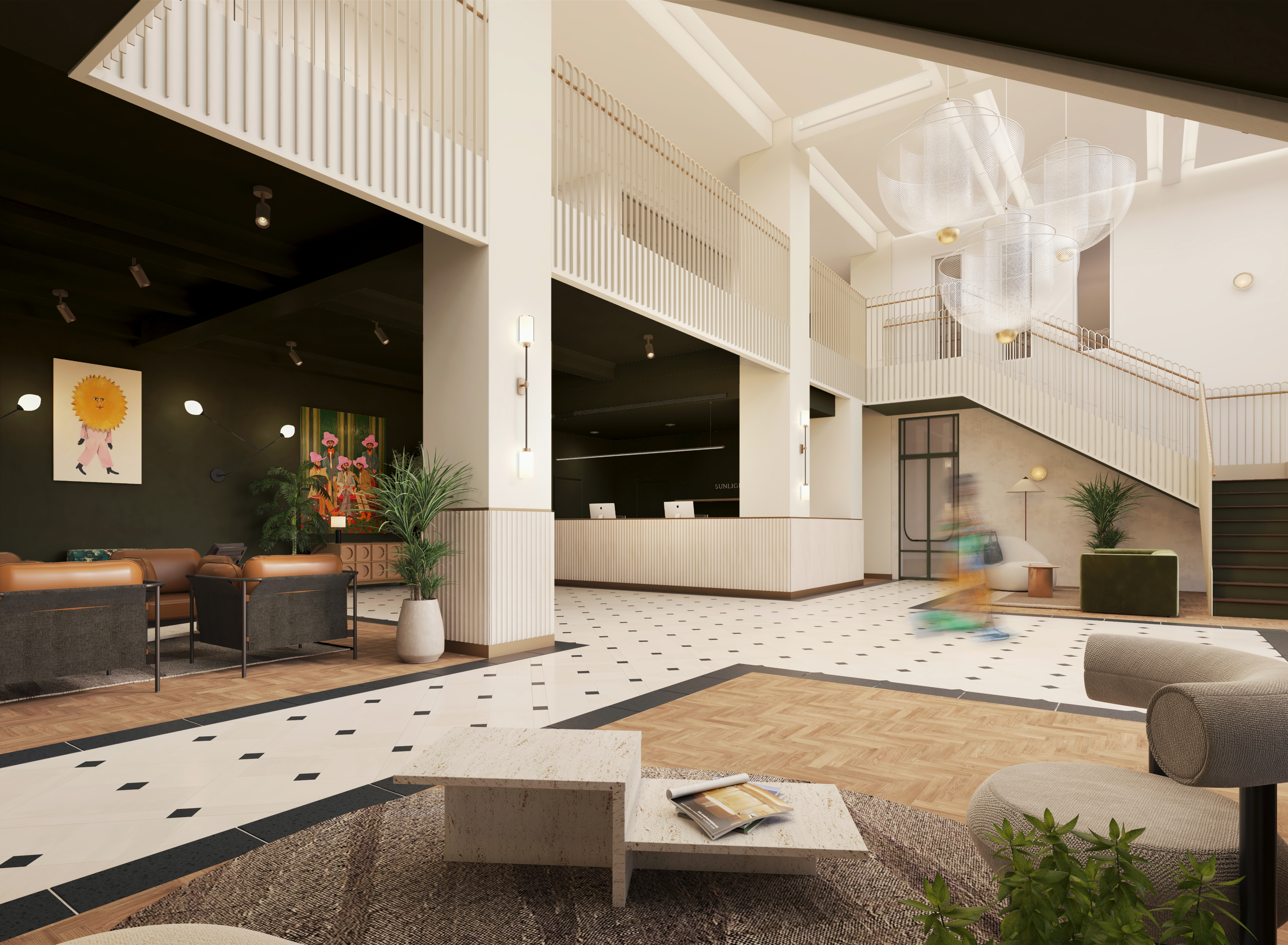
CGI of proposed reception in the refurbished Sunlight House, 2024.

== See also ==
- Listed buildings in Manchester-M3
- Sunlight Chambers, Newcastle
