= St John Street, Manchester =

Street in Manchester, England

St John Street
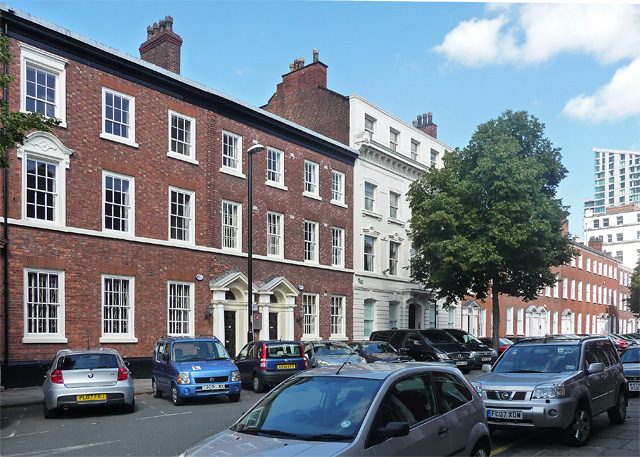
- Looking west along St John Street

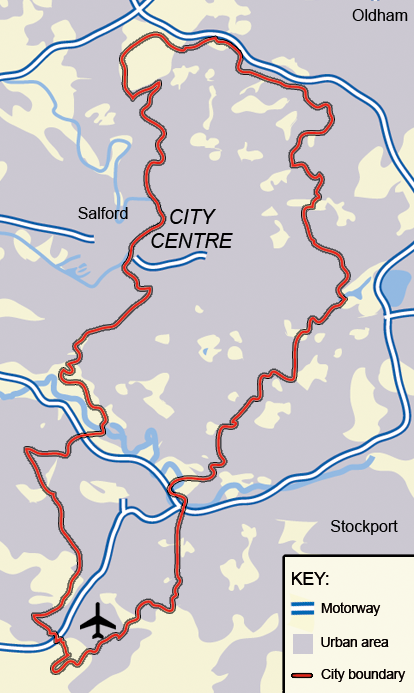
- Location within Manchester
- Length: 148 m (486 ft)
- Postal code: M3
- Coordinates: 53°28′39″N 2°15′05″W

Construction
- Construction start: c.1770
- Completion: c.1830

St John Street is a street in central Manchester, England. It consists mainly of late Georgian and Regency era terraced houses. Laid out between 1770 and 1830, the street runs roughly east–west between Deansgate and Byrom Street, terminating in an urban park, formerly the site of St John's Church, at its eastern end. Originally built for the prosperous Manchester upper-middle classes, by the 20th century it had become the preserve of the medical and legal professions. In the 21st century, some of the buildings are being reconverted to residential use. The only surviving Georgian terraced street in central Manchester, many of its buildings are listed.

== History ==
In 1745, during the Jacobite invasion of England, Charles Edward Stuart set up an artillery battery in the St John area, which was then a patchwork of fields on the edge of the City of Manchester. (Note: The artillery battery is commemorated in the naming of Artillery Street, which runs parallel to St John Street, and by a wall plaque on a building on Byrom Street.) Later in the 18th century, the area was developed by Edward Byrom, of a family of prominent local landowners. Resident at Byrom House, he established Manchester's first bank, and funded the construction of St John's Church in 1769. (Note: St John's Church was demolished in 1931 and is now the site of St John's Gardens.)

St John Street, named for the church, was developed from around 1770. It was undertaken as a speculative development, and building continued piecemeal until the 1830s. Originally designed as homes for the wealthier middle-classes, by the 20th century most of the buildings had been converted to offices, principally for the medical and legal professions.

In the 21st century, some of the buildings are being re-converted to residential use; the high selling prices of these conversions have led to St John Street being dubbed Manchester's "Millionaires' Row". The wider St John's area, which was designated a conservation area in 1970, (Note: The boundaries of the conservation area are Artillery Street, Longworth Street, Camp Street, Culvercliffe Walk, Lower Byrom Street, Quay Street and Byrom Street.) is the focus of a major redevelopment by Allied London and the City Council. (Note: The redevelopment of the St John's area was occasioned by the closure of the Granada Studios site on Quay Street in 2013. The land was sold to a partnership formed by Allied London and Manchester City Council.)

== Architecture and description ==
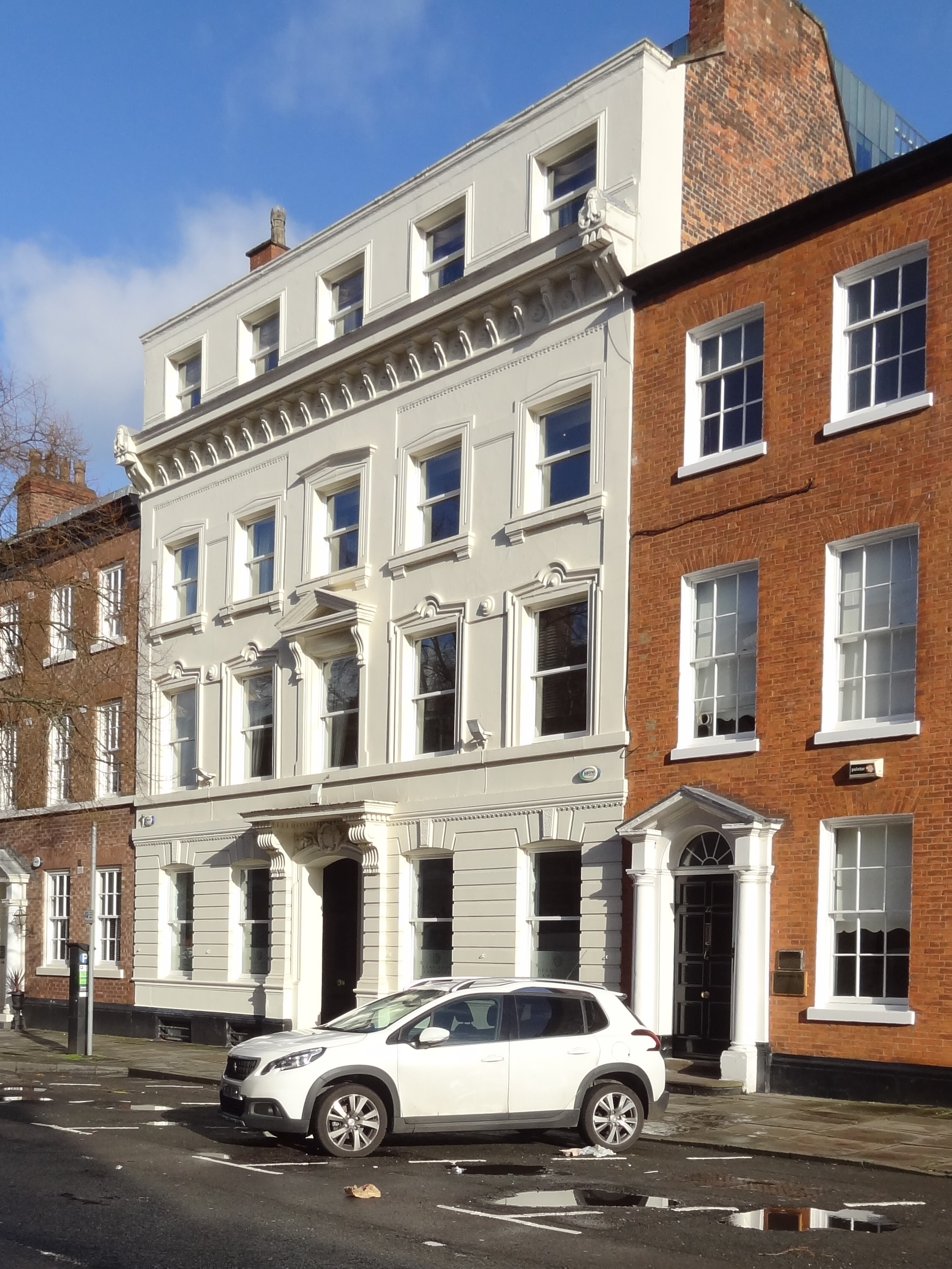
24, St John Street

At the Deansgate entrance to St John Street is a Grade II listed K6 telephone box. Dating from 1935, it follows the design of Sir George Gilbert Scott, introduced to celebrate the Silver Jubilee of King George V. The start of the street was the subject of reconstruction and rebuilding in the 20th century, but its remaining length dates from the late Georgian and Regency periods. Built in red/brown brick, and mainly of three storeys, the buildings are all listed at Grade II. The run of houses begins with Nos. 8 and 8A, and continues with No. 10, both on the right-hand side of the street; Nos. 11–17, No. 19 and Nos. 21–25, all on the left-hand side; and Nos. 12–16, Nos. 18 and 20, No. 22, No. 24, Nos. 24A and 26, and No. 28 on the right-hand side. No. 24 is taller and of five bays and was probably remodelled in the mid-19th century.
