= Quay Street =

Street in Manchester, England

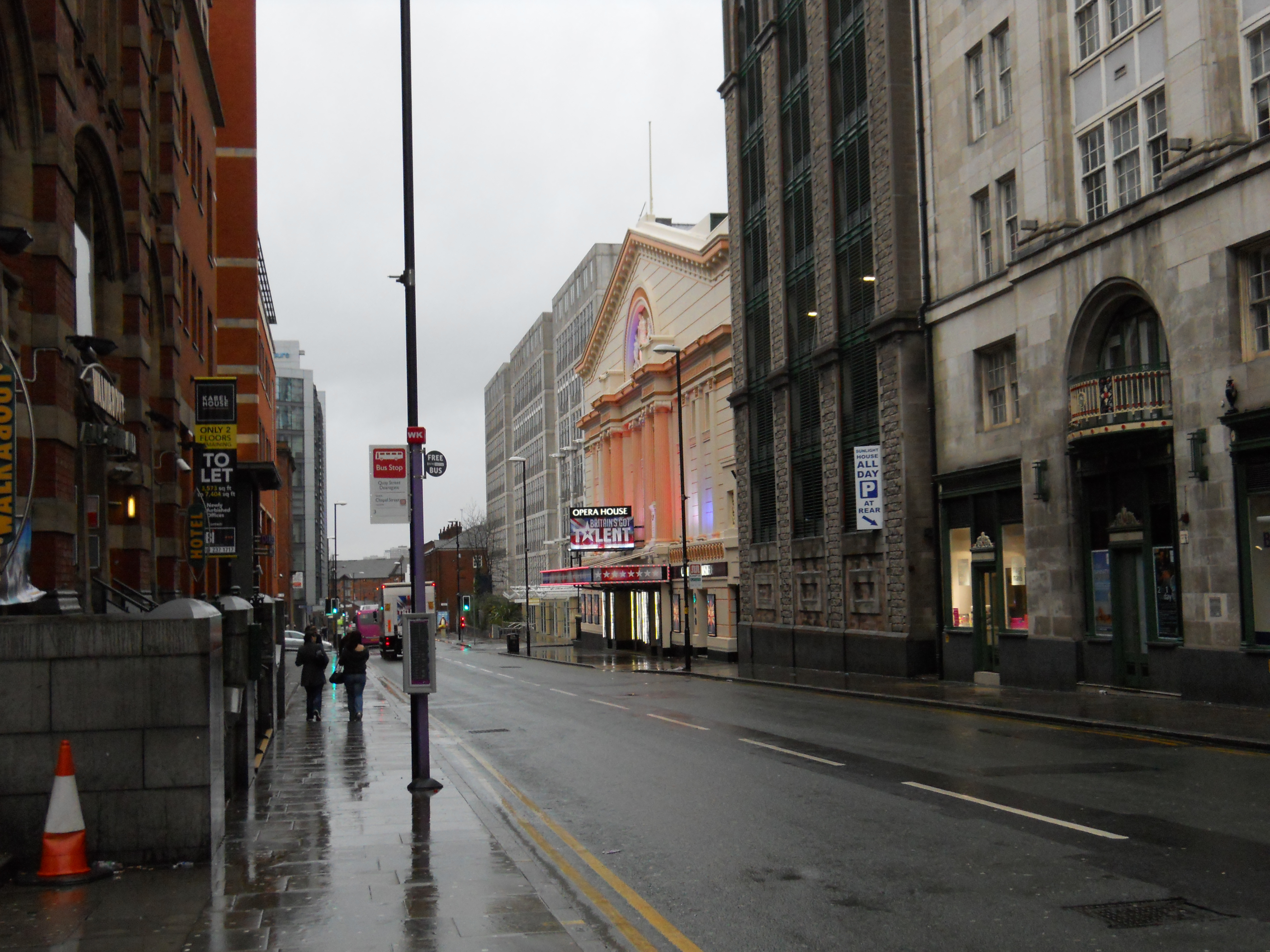
- Quay Street, Manchester city centre
- Interactive map of Quay Street
- Length: 0.3 mi (0.48 km)
- Location: Manchester, England
- Postal code: M3
- Coordinates: 53.4788°N 2.2523°W
- East end: A56
- West end: Water Street

Construction
- Completion: 18th century

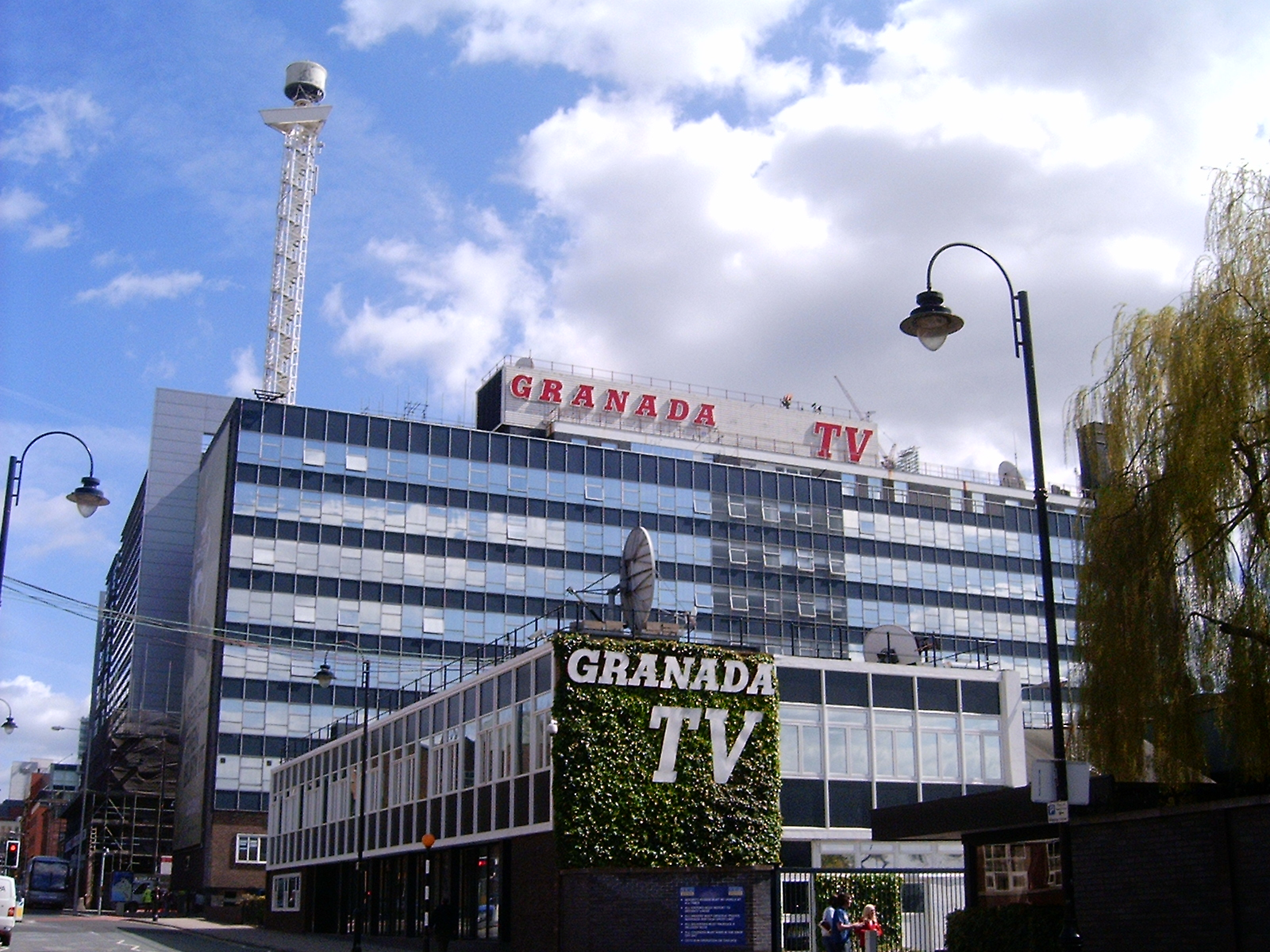
Granada Studios, Quay Street

Quay Street is a street in Manchester city centre, England. Designated as part of the A34, it continues Peter Street westwards towards the River Irwell and Salford. It forms the northern boundary of Spinningfields, whiled Castlefield, the historic area of the city, lies to the south. Laid out in the 18th century to provide access to a quay on the river, the street lined with several listed buildings.

== History ==
Edward Byrom built a quay on the River Irwell in the 1730s, and the street was laid out to link it with Deansgate, then known as Aldport Lane. In 1794 it was extended eastwards to Mosley Street. Richard Cobden's red-brick Georgiantownhouse, later the first home of Owens College and subsequently Manchester County Court, is a Grade II* listed building. In the 1840s Harry Stokes ran a beerhouse at numbers 3–5 Quay Street. The Hospital for Skin Diseases was also located on the street. The Opera House, formerly the New Theatre, was built in 1912 by Albert Richardson and Charles Lovett Gill with Farquarson, in the classical style.

Architect Joseph Sunlight built the Grade II listed Sunlight House. He later proposed the Quay Street Tower, a 360-foot (110 m) Art Deco high-rise building behind Sunlight House, but planning permission was refused. Had it been built, it would have been not only Manchester's tallest building, but the tallest in Europe.

The street is also known for Granada Studios, the UK's first purpose-built television studios and the home of Granada Television. Designed by architect Ralph Tubbs, the building was an early example of construction using the curtain-wall method. In September 2010, the red 'Granada TV' sign was removed from the building due to extensive corrosion.

== See also ==
- List of streets and roads in Manchester
