= South Manchester Synagogue =

Orthodox synagogue in South Manchester, England

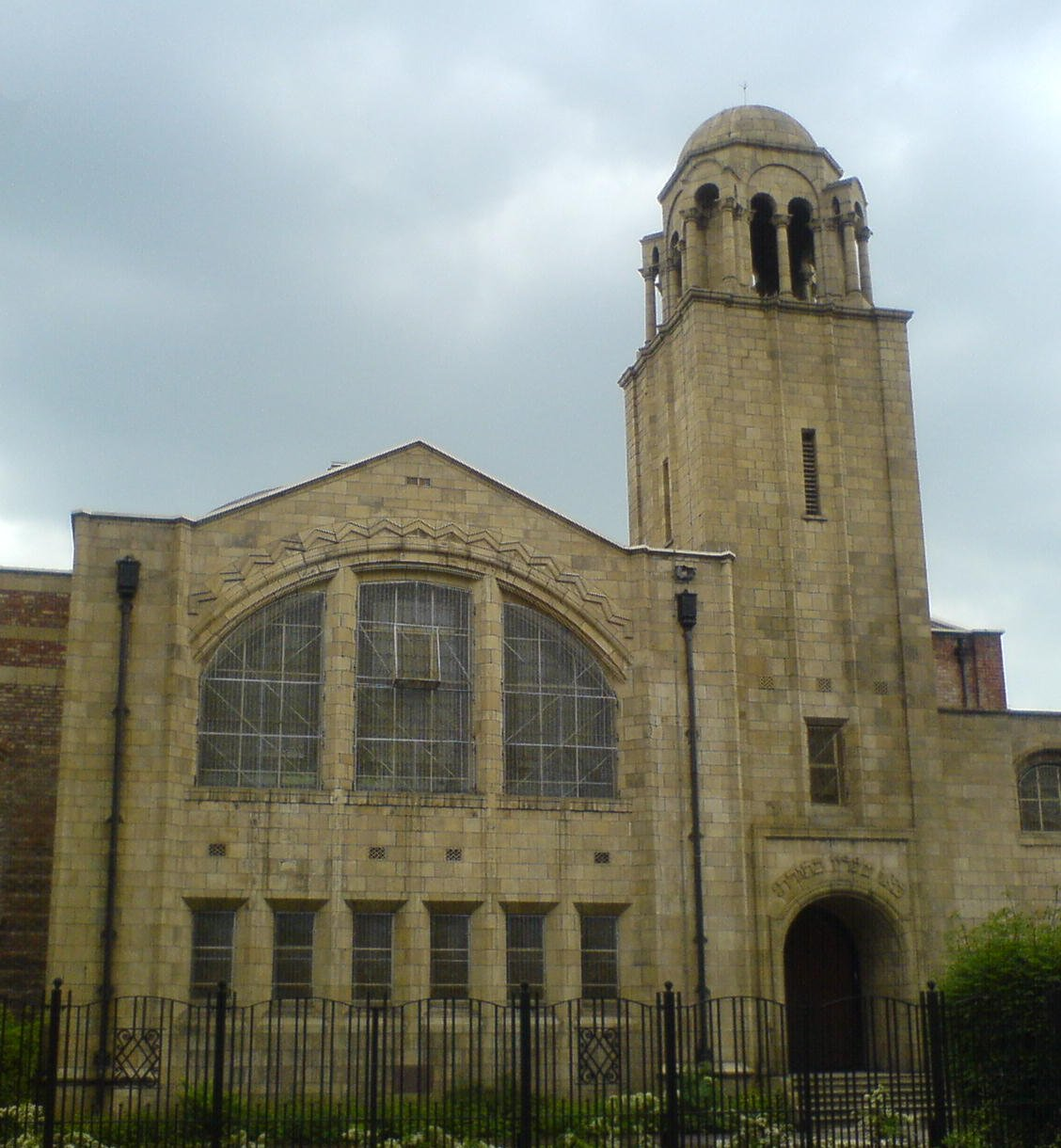

- Location of the synagogue in Greater Manchester

Religion
- Affiliation: Orthodox Judaism
- Rite: Nusach Ashkenaz
- Ecclesiastical or organizational status: Synagogue
- Status: Active

Location
- Location: The Firs, Bowdon, Altrincham, South Manchester, England WA14 2TE
- Country: United Kingdom
- Interactive map of South Manchester Synagogue
- Coordinates: 53°26′33″N 2°13′18″W

Architecture
- Established: 1872 (as a congregation)
- Completed: 1913 (Fallowfield); 2002 (Bowdon)

Website
- southmanchestersynagogue.org.uk
- South Manchester Synagogue (former)
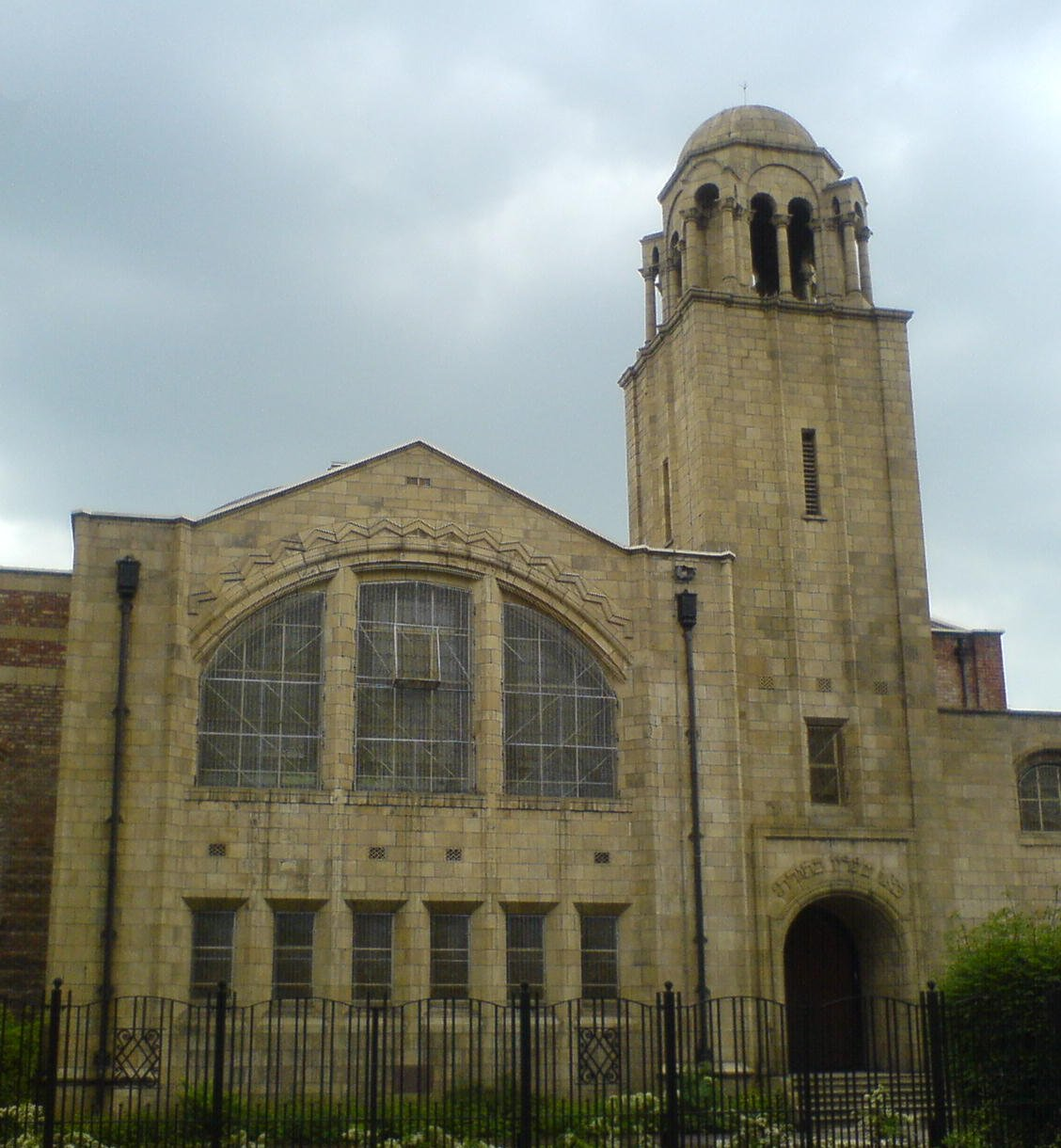
- Former synagogue in Fallowfield

History
- Original use: Synagogue (1913–2002)

Site notes
- Architectural style: Byzantine Revival
- Current use: Student centre

Listed Building – Grade II
- Official name: Synagogue
- Type: Listed building
- Designated: 2 October 1974
- Reference no.: 1254890

The South Manchester Synagogue is an Orthodox Jewish community and synagogue, located in Bowdon, Altrincham, South Manchester, England, in the United Kingdom. The congregation was formed in 1872 and worships in the Ashkenazi rite.

In 2002, the community relocated from the Grade II listed building, built in 1913, located in the Fallowfield district, to new premises in Bowdon.

== History ==
South Manchester Synagogue was founded in 1872 by a group of people who wished to cater for those Ashkenazi families who lived south of Manchester city centre. In 1913, the congregation moved from premises in Sidney Street, Chorlton on Medlock, to a new building in the then semi-rural location of Wilbraham Road, Fallowfield.

The synagogue flourished for many years in its new location, due in no small part to the arrival of successive waves of refugees from Europe in the 1930s. Such was the growth in membership, that an extension had to be built to the women's gallery, and later additional parallel services had to be held in the new synagogue hall during the High Holy Days. Membership peaked at over 800 during the 1970s.

Just as when the synagogue moved to Wilbraham Road in 1913, in the late 1980s many congregants began to move out of the area, this time to the Hale/Bowdon region. This caused a sharp decline in membership, meaning that the congregation were forced to sell the Grade II listed building in Fallowfield to a Jewish student trust and move the synagogue to Bowdon.

The first services were held in the new location on 10 August 2002, with the official opening taking place on 6 September 2002 for Rosh Hashanah. In 2003, Charles, Prince of Wales visited the synagogue to mark its opening, making it the first synagogue in the United Kingdom to be opened by a member of the royal family. Just a year later in April 2004, the synagogue was also visited by Chief Rabbi Jonathan Sacks.

The synagogue has a number of charismatic leaders, including for many years Rabbi Felix Carlebach, Chazan Solomon Morris and more recently Rabbi Yitzchok Rubin. That tradition of vibrant leadership was later continued by Rabbi Dovid Lewis and Chazan Michael Isdale.

Throughout its history, the synagogue has had to come to terms with demographic trends within the community. In the same way as the move to Fallowfield reflected the move of the membership out of the city centre, so its most recent history reflects the move of many members of the congregation to Hale, Bowdon and the surrounding area.

== New synagogue building in Bowdon ==
The South Manchester Synagogue building in Bowdon is a purpose-built contemporary building. Constraints posed by the compact site necessitated stacking the principal rooms – the galleried synagogue and a large communal hall – one above the other. Use was made of the sloping site to place the communal hall at lower-ground level and to create a sunken garden with a safe play area for children.

The main entrance is a glazed foyer with voids reaching down to the lower-ground floor and up to the first-floor entrance to the women's gallery, admitting daylight into the heart of the building.

The synagogue itself is square with the bimah set centrally in a traditional arrangement. The low pitched roof rises to a glazed lantern over the bimah with an exposed steel roof structure that further emphasises the latter's position and importance. The women's gallery is arranged on three sides of the main space and care has been taken to create a degree of intimacy while still being able to accommodate large numbers for major festivals.

The windows on each side of the women's gallery are fitted with stained glass windows by the Scottish artist John Clark. The windows represent Rosh Hashanah and Yom Kippur and the festivals of Sukkot, Pesach and Shavuot. Further stained glass windows are planned for the main entrance on the theme of the Exodus and for the three-storey atrium on the Shema. The Torah ark and synagogue interior are all finished in oak to maintain the light, airy ambience of the building.

Alongside the synagogue at ground level is the library and Beth midrash in which weekday services are held. A retractable wall allows this area to become part of the main worship space, providing additional seating for Rosh Hashanah and Yom Kippur.

The synagogue was designed to enable access by both able-bodied and disabled people while still conforming to the requirements of Halacha. Sloping ramps provide ease of access to the main entrance and a lift has been installed with special programming for use on Shabbat. A mechitzah has also been installed on the ground floor for women unable to access the women's gallery.

== Former synagogue building in Fallowfield ==
The community's former synagogue building was in Wilbraham Road, Fallowfield. The result of a competition won by Joseph Sunlight, the synagogue was completed in 1913, and is a structure of diverse stylistic influences and innovative technical construction, as was listed as a Grade II building in 1974.

Sunlight adopted the style of a Turkish mosque, complete with dome and minaret though interpreted in a modernist, it has even been said cubist, idiom. Sunlight confessed to quoting Hagia Sophia in Constantinople and the tower of Westminster Cathedral. The building marked a first in British synagogue construction in avoiding column supports for its 35 ft dome by the use of reinforced concrete in its span and the lattice girders supporting the cantilever gallery.

In 2003, the Fallowfield building became redundant, the congregation having relocated, and plans were drawn up by a charitable trust to convert it to a residential Jewish student centre. As of 2006, the building was being renovated, with major changes to the interior. The ladies' gallery was turned into a complete second floor to replace the function room previously in the annex, which was demolished.

== See also ==
- History of the Jews in England
- List of Jewish communities in the United Kingdom
- List of synagogues in the United Kingdom
