= County Court, Manchester =

Listed building in Manchester, England

County Court
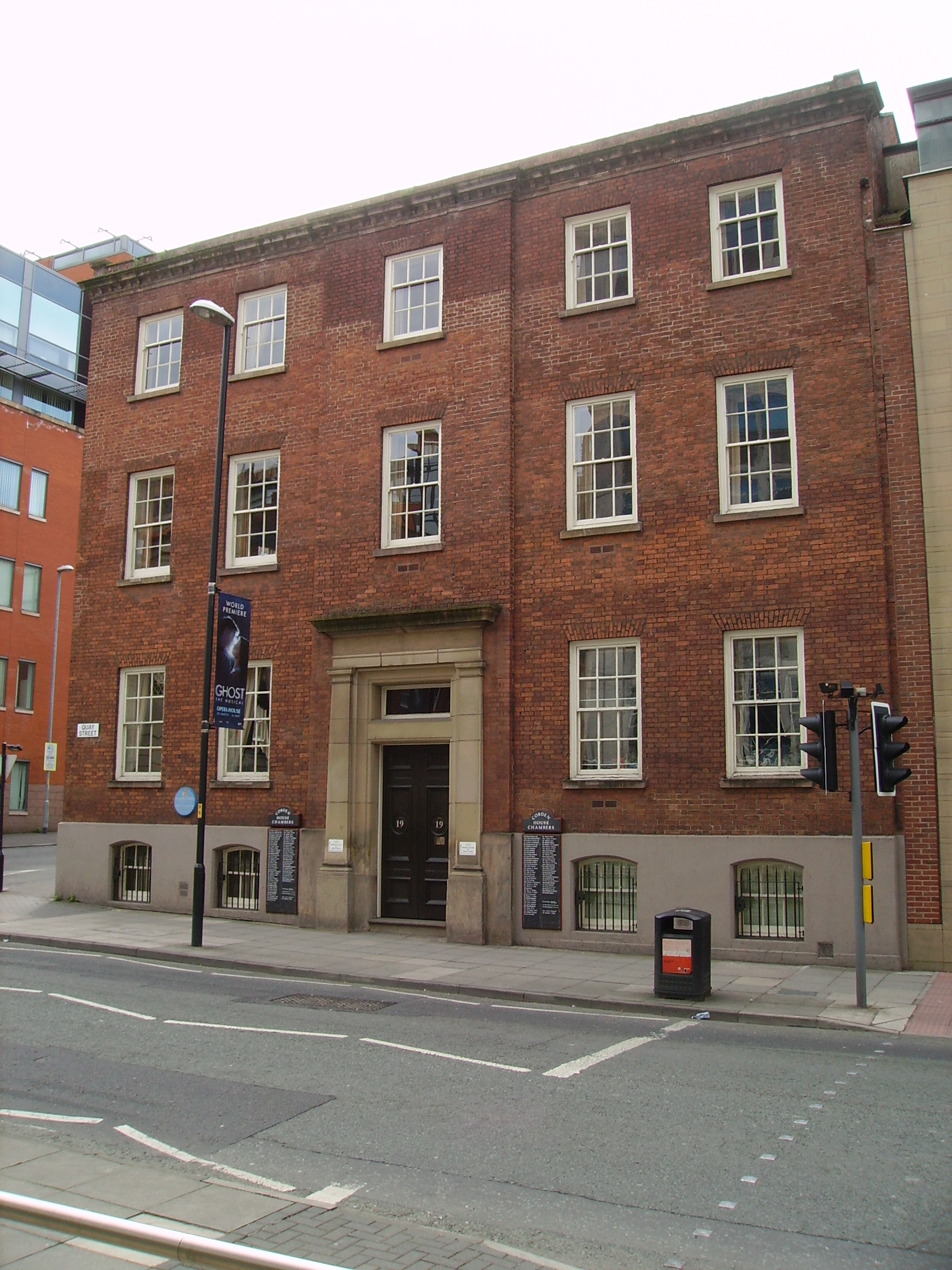
- The County Court in 2011

- Location within Greater Manchester

General information
- Architectural style: Georgian
- Location: Quay Street, Manchester, England
- Coordinates: 53.4786°N 2.2521°W
- Completed: 1770s

Design and construction
- Designations

Listed Building – Grade II*
- Official name: Cobden House, 19 Quay Street
- Designated: 3 October 1974
- Reference no.: 1247447

The County Court (officially listed as Cobden House, 19 Quay Street) is a Georgian townhouse on Quay Street in Manchester, England, that served as the city's county court from 1878 to 1990. It was the home of the politician and reformer Richard Cobden, and later the site of Owens College, the forerunner of the University of Manchester. In origin, it is a townhouse of the 1770s, described as "the best preserved Georgian house in the [city] centre". The house is built of brick and has a late 19th-century doorcase. It was designated a Grade II* listed building on 3 October 1974. The interior is not original.

== History ==
Richard Cobden lived at the house from 1836 to 1843, and it served as his base during the years when he acted as the main spokesman for the Anti-Corn Law League. A statue of him, together with one of his fellow reformers John Bright, stands in Albert Square. The house was sold in 1850 and became the site of Owens College, which, together with the Manchester Royal School of Medicine, formed the Victoria University of Manchester in 1880. When the college moved to its present site on Oxford Road in 1873, the building was purchased for use as Manchester's County Court, which opened in 1878. By the 1970s the building had become badly decayed, and first the courts and then the administrative offices were relocated. The court closed in 1990. It was later purchased for use as a set of barristers' chambers and has been comprehensively refurbished, with much of its original Georgian décor restored.

== Architecture ==
The house, of three storeys and a basement, is a Georgian townhouse built in the mid-18th century and subsequently extended to the rear and altered. It is constructed on a rectangular plan in red brick laid in Flemish bond on a stucco plinth. Its façade has five bays, with the centre bay set slightly forward. The central doorway has a late 19th-century pilastered doorcase with a frieze and cornice, which replaced the original raised, pedimented doorway and double flight of steps. The windows have raised sills and flat heads, with 12-pane sashes at ground and first-floor levels and 9-pane sashes on the second floor, while the basement has segmental-headed windows.

== Gallery ==
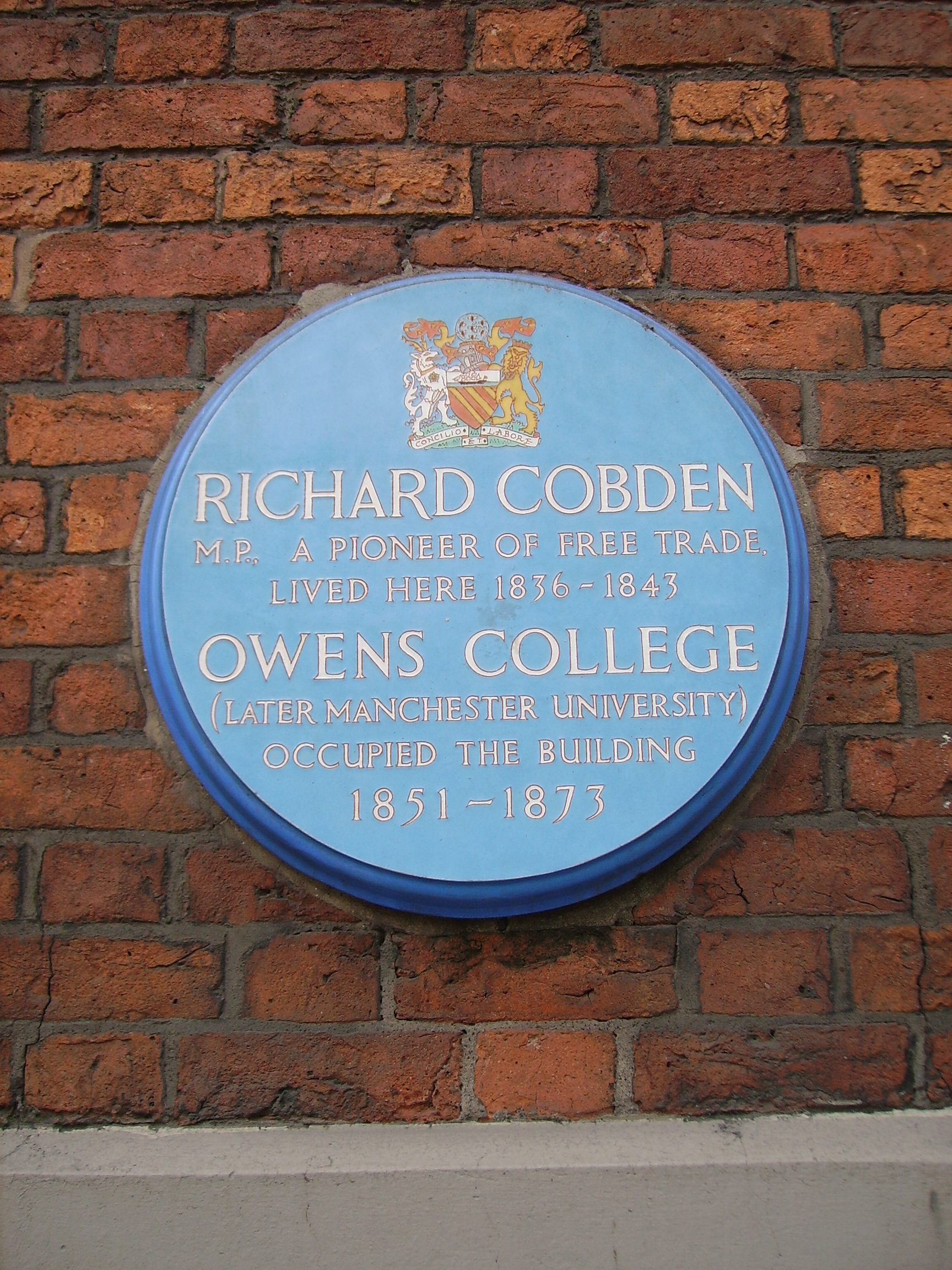
Plaque commemorating Richard Cobden and Owens College

== See also ==
- Grade II* listed buildings in Greater Manchester
- Listed buildings in Manchester-M3
