= Harry Stokes =

- Born: circa 1799; Doncaster, England
- Died: 15 October 1859; Salford, England
- Other names: Harriett Stokes, Henry Stokes
- Occupations: builder, beerhouse manager, Special constable
- Known for: Gender variance
- Partner: Francis Collins

Harry Stokes (c. 1799 – 15 October 1859) was a master bricklayer, beerhouse manager and special constable in Manchester. Assigned female gender at birth but lived as a man. Harry had two long-term relationships with women, each lasting over 20 years. In 1838 and 1859, his gender variance became the subject of local and national newspaper articles, in which he was described as a 'man-woman' and a 'female husband'.

Today Harry Stokes's life can be seen within the framework of LGBT history — he can be viewed as a trans man, or as a cross dressing lesbian. "

== Early life ==
Born in Doncaster around 1799, Harry Stokes was assigned female at birth. He assumed a male identity at a young age, and undertook a builder's apprenticeship in Bawtry. Newspaper articles published in 1838 report that Harry married his first wife in Sheffield around 1816. There is a record of a Henry Stoake marrying an Ann Hants at Sheffield Cathedral in January 1817.

== 1820s and 1830s ==
In the 1820s and 30s, Harry Stokes built up a successful bricklaying firm in Manchester. At its peak he employed eight men and an apprentice, with his wife keeping the company accounts. He was a well-respected tradesman specialising in chimney and flue construction.

From 1824 he is listed in Manchester trade directories as a bricklayer. The 1824 Pigot & Dean's Manchester and Salford Directory lists Henry Stokes living at 13 Potter Street. From 1828 to 1830 he lived at 11 Cumberland Street, and from 1832 to 1838 at 21 Cumberland Street. The area where Harry and his wife lived is now Spinningfields– Cumberland Street was on the site where The Avenue is today.

In the late 1820s and early 1830s Harry worked shifts as a special constable policing events where there were large gatherings of people with the potential for trouble, such as protest marches and demonstrations.

In the Public Officials section of the 1829 Pigot's trade directory Harry is listed as a Special Constable for the 13th District of Manchester, the Old Quay District. Then in the 1832 Pigot's Manchester Directory, he is registered as a Special Constable for the 11th District, St. Peter's District.

== 1838 press reports and ballads ==
In April 1838, after twenty-two years of marriage, Harry's wife approached a lawyer for advice on getting a formal separation and a maintenance settlement as he was withholding housekeeping money, getting drunk and ill-treating her. She advised the shocked lawyer that her husband was not a man, but a woman, and "also stated, that she accidentally made the discovery of the sex of her husband as much as two or three years back; but that she had kept the secret till the present time." Harry Stokes was examined by a police surgeon who "gave a certificate declaring that the individual in question was a woman". The Manchester Guardian stated "This woman-man, who, for probably more than five-and-twenty years, has succeeded in concealing her sex, and in pursuing a trade of more than ordinarily masculine and hazardous description, with a degree of skill and ability which had led to her establishment of a good business in this town". Although news articles stated that "her real name is believed to be Harriet Stoakes", there is no evidence that Stokes ever confirmed his name assigned at birth to be Harriet.

Harry Stokes's gender became the subject of gossip and ridicule around Manchester. Ballads were composed about him and sung in the streets. There is some evidence that the ballads told the tale of an ill-fated, one-day marriage to a barmaid called Betsy. On the wedding day Harry managed to play the part of a groom well enough, but on the wedding night there was a terrible row and he was charged with assault and sentenced to two months in jail. At his court hearing Betsy declared that she wouldn't live with her husband because he was really a woman. However, the details of these ballads may actually be about a James Allen, another 'female husband'

== 1839 – 1859 ==
After separating from his first wife, Harry set up home with a widow called Francis Collins, a woman who had worked as a barmaid in his local beerhouse. The couple moved to Salford for two years and then in 1840 they established a beerhouse at numbers 3 – 5 Quay Street, Manchester. John Heaton who was Francis's son from her first marriage was later reported as saying that he "always regarded Harry as his stepfather, and his mother assumed the name of Stokes and passed as his wife." In the United Kingdom Census 1841 Harry Stokes and Francis Stokes are registered as living on Quay Street.

In the 1841 Pigot & Slater's trade directory Francis Collins is listed as a beer retailer at 3 Quay Street, whereas Harry is listed in the 1843 edition. By 1846 Harry and Francis had moved to a beerhouse at 22 Camp Street called the Pilgrims Rest which was registered in the name of Francis's son John Heaton. By 1852 Harry, Francis and John had moved their beerhouse to 28 Camp Street.

Harry is listed in the 1855 and 1856 Slater's trade directories as a bricklayer at 28 Camp Street.

Around 1856 Harry moved to 11 Richmond Street Salford with Francis and John Heaton.

== Death inquest ==
On 15 October 1859, a body was found in the River Irwell at Mode Wheel, bolt upright in the water with a top hat still jammed firmly on his head. The corpse was taken to the Swann Inn, Pendlebury where an inquest was held. A juror recognised the body as that of Harry Stokes, advising that he was "not a man but a woman". Harry's body was inspected by two women who confirmed it was that of a woman.

The inquest into Harry's death was reported in the local press, with headlines such as 'A WOMAN PASSING AS A MAN FOR FORTY YEARS' – the Manchester Examiner; and 'HARRY STOKES THE MAN WOMAN' – The Salford weekly News. The stories were reprinted in papers across the country.

The inquest verdict was 'Found drowned – supposed suicide'. Harry's death was entered in the General Register Office under the name Harriett Stokes. While there is evidence the local community used the name Harriet to refer to Harry Stokes, there is no evidence that he ever confirmed his birth name to be Harriet.

News reports on Harry Stokes' death inquest appear to show that his gender variance was generally known and accepted by the working class community he was part of. The Manchester Examiner reported: "Harriet Taylor, who lives in the neighbourhood, said she knew Stokes well. He was a bricksetter. The proper name was Harriet Stokes, but he went by the name of Harry Stokes. Some years ago Stokes married a woman in Manchester. They lived together as man and wife, and kept a beershop in Quay Street, Manchester. Several of the jury recollected the case, and that ballads were composed and sung in the streets on its being known that the supposed man was a woman".

== Legacy ==
Harry Stokes's life was dramatised in a play by Abi Hynes commissioned by the UK's LGBT History Month entitled 'Mister Stokes - The Man-Woman of Manchester'. The play was performed at the People's History Museum in February 2016 as part of their celebrations of LGBT History Month.

Since 2016 Harry Stokes has featured in an LGBT+ history trail within the main galleries of People's History Museum.

In 2018, BBC Sounds released Ballad of Harry Stokes, a podcast exploring Stokes's life. Narrated by actress Annie Wallace, and featuring a ballad by theatre maker Krishna Istha, the podcast was part of the Gaychester series exploring the LGBT+ history of Manchester.

In 2019 Stokes's work as a special constable was featured in an exhibit on specials at Greater Manchester Police Museum.
