= Joseph Sunlight =

Architect and politician (1889–1978)

Joseph Sunlight

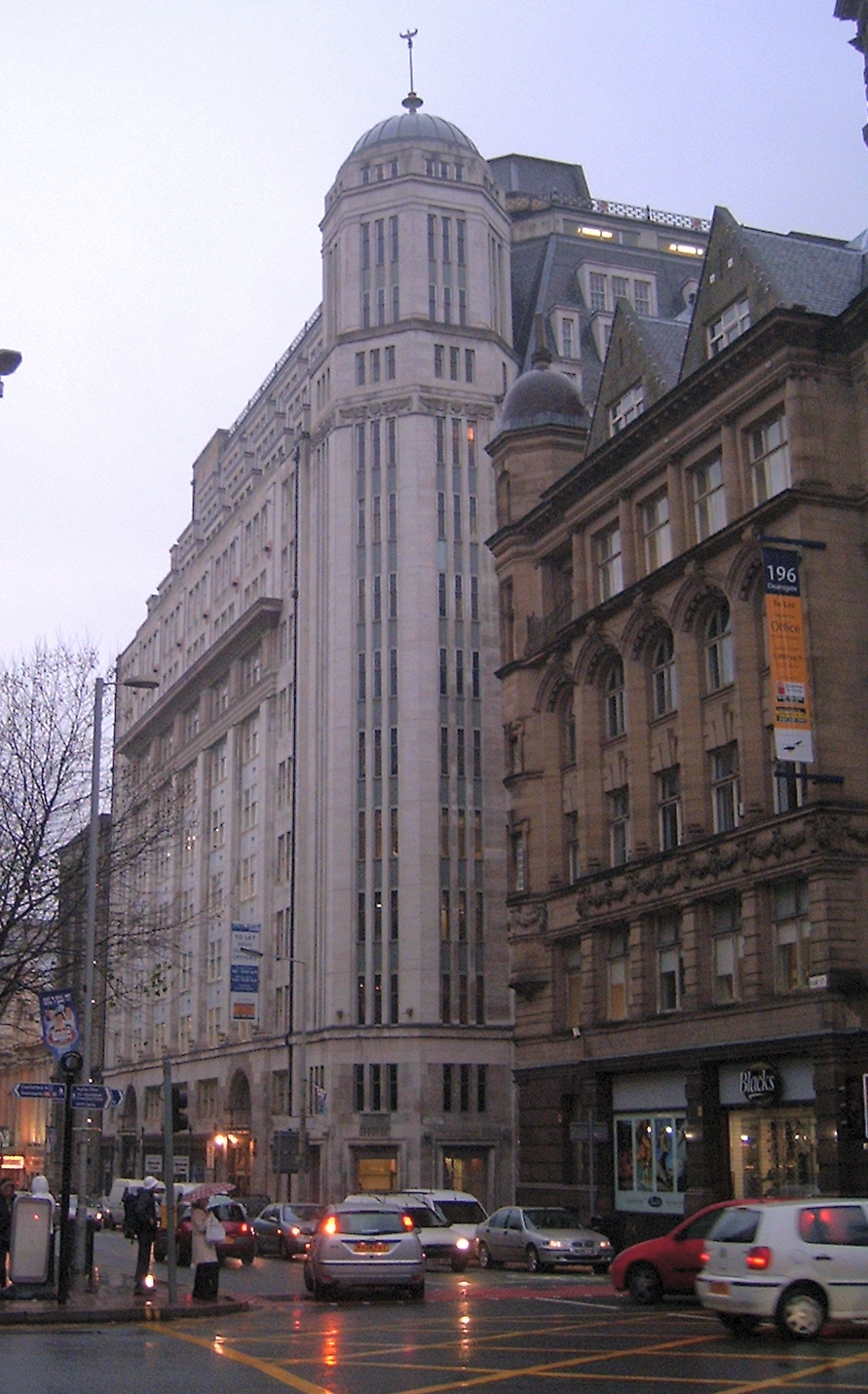
Sunlight House, Manchester

Joseph Sunlight (2 January 1889 [O.S. 20 December 1888] – 15 April 1978), was a Belarusian/English architect whose energy amassed him a great fortune in Manchester and left at least one fine building in Sunlight House. He was also a Liberal politician in his adopted country.

== Early life ==
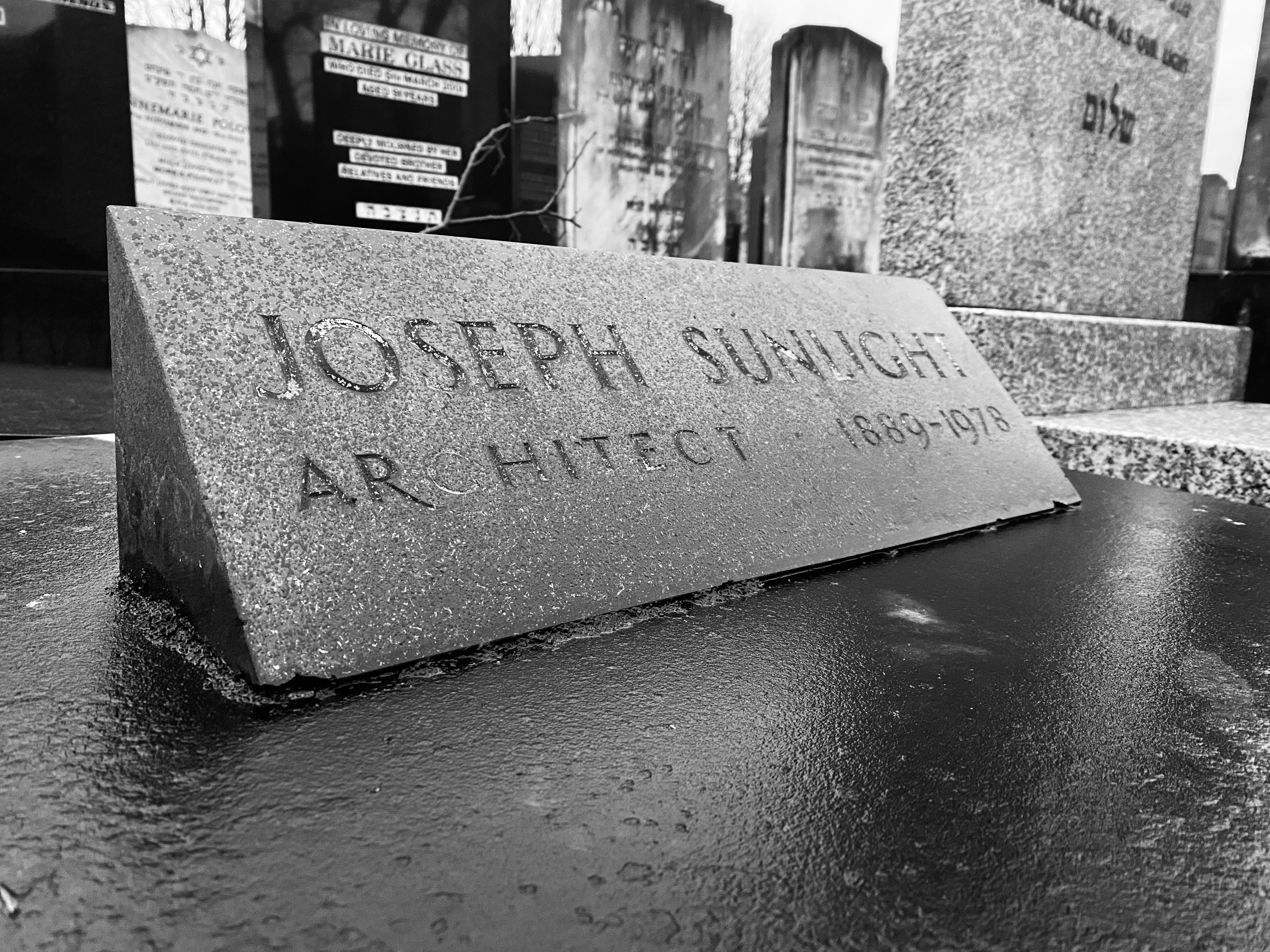
The grave of Joseph Sunlight in Southern Cemetery, Manchester

Born Novogrudok, Belarus, then part of Russia, his Jewish family were named Schimschlavitch, his father a cotton merchant. In later life, Sunlight enjoyed to "dine out" on tales of his family's adventures and brushes with the Tsarist authorities but it is suspected that these were largely fanciful. The family emigrated to England in 1890 to avoid conscription and settled in Manchester, probably choosing their new name from Port Sunlight.

== Architectural career ==
Sunlight was apprenticed to an architect in Manchester in 1904 and by 1907 had his own practice in St Ann's Square. Reputedly, by 1910, he had designed and built more than 1000 houses in Prestwich and claimed that by 1921 he had created more than one million pounds' worth of property.

He also designed and built factories and warehouses, but his greatest memorial is Sunlight House (1932) in Manchester. In 1949, he proposed a 40-storey extension, but it was rejected by the city council. His sole religious building was the technically innovative South Manchester Synagogue (1913) in Fallowfield.

== Political career ==
Sunlight was elected Liberal Member of Parliament for Shrewsbury in the 1923 general election and introduced a Private Member's Bill on the standardisation of bricks. Though the bill survived by a single vote, it was lost when Sunlight was defeated in the 1924 United Kingdom general election.

== Death ==
Sunlight died in April 1978, aged 89, and was buried in the Jewish section of Southern Cemetery, Manchester.

== Personal life ==
Sunlight, though always professing his affection for the faith of his parents, seems to have been more interested in his favourite pastime of horse racing.

He married Edith Forshaw in 1940, and they had one son, artist Ben Sunlight (1935–2002).

== Bibliography ==
- Kadish, S. "Sunlight, Joseph (1889–1978)", Oxford Dictionary of National Biography, Oxford University Press, 2004 <http://www.oxforddnb.com/view/article/42156, accessed 5 June 2005> (subscription required)
- Obituary, Manchester Evening News, 18 April 1978

Parliament of the United Kingdom
Preceded by Viscount Sandon	Member of Parliament for Shrewsbury; 1923 – 1924	Succeeded by Viscount Sandon
