= Stockport =

Town in Greater Manchester, England

- Town
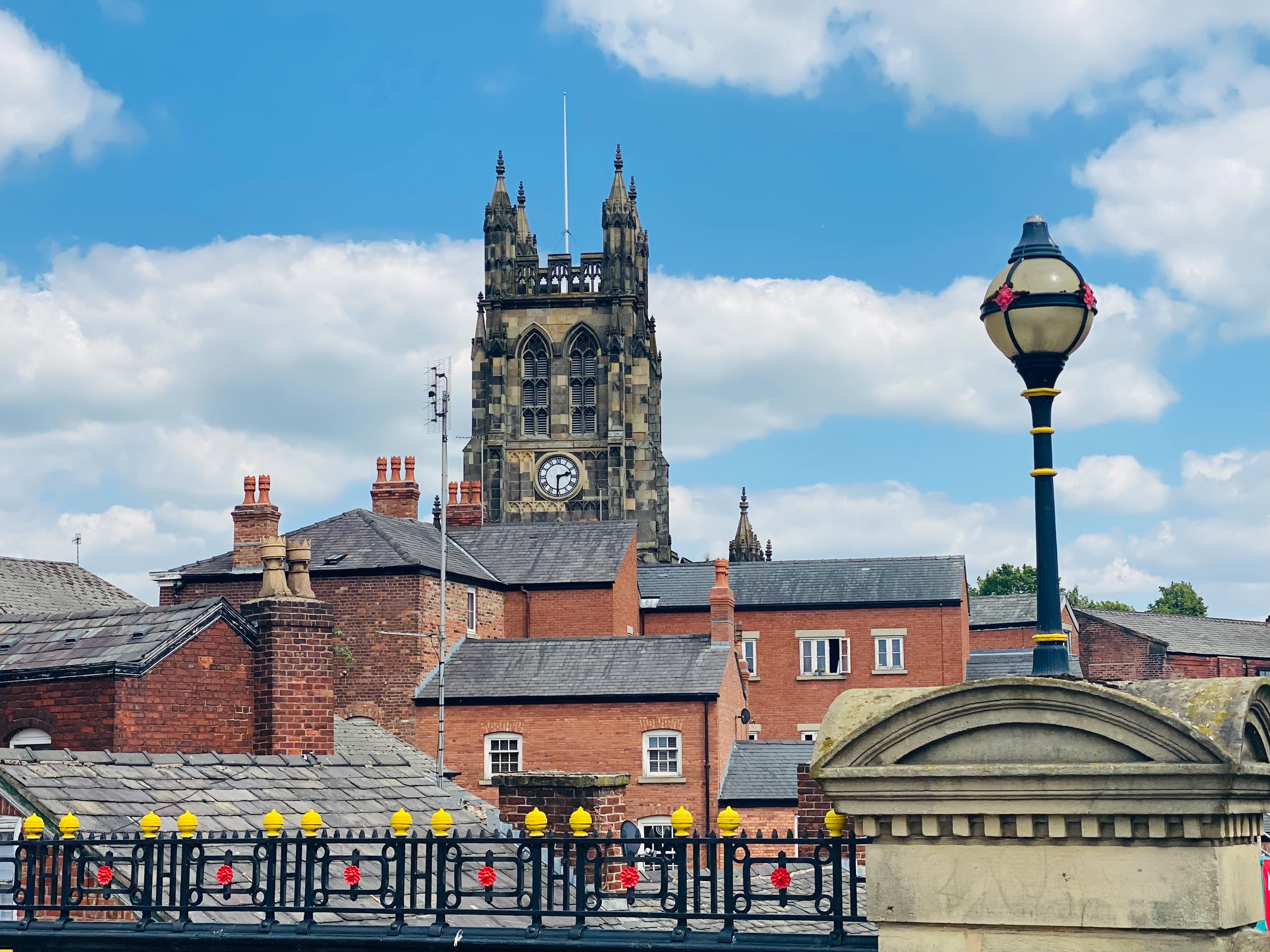
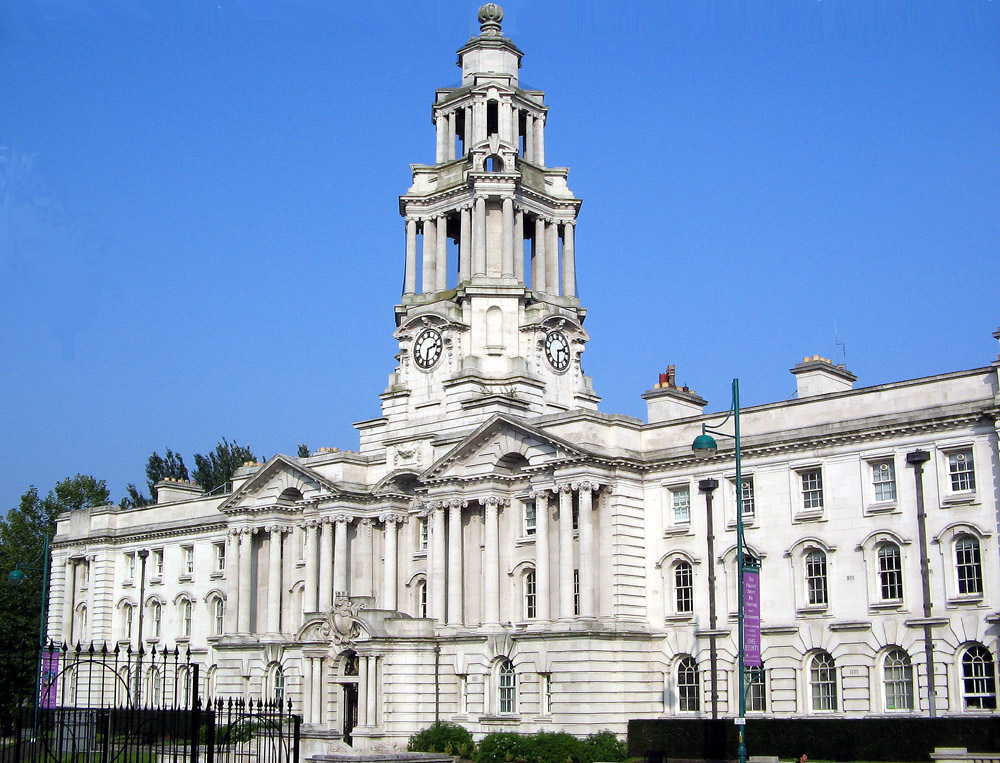
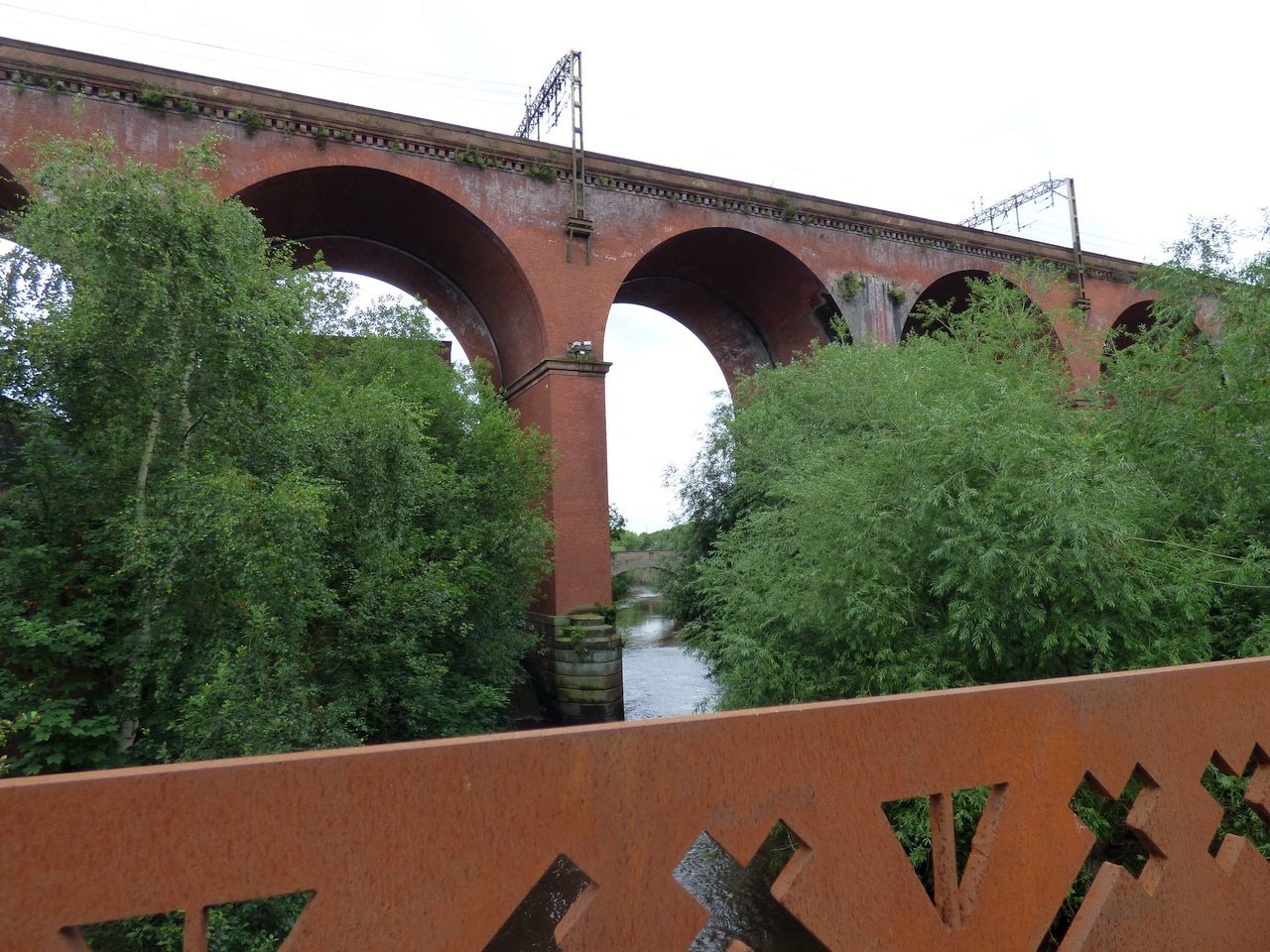
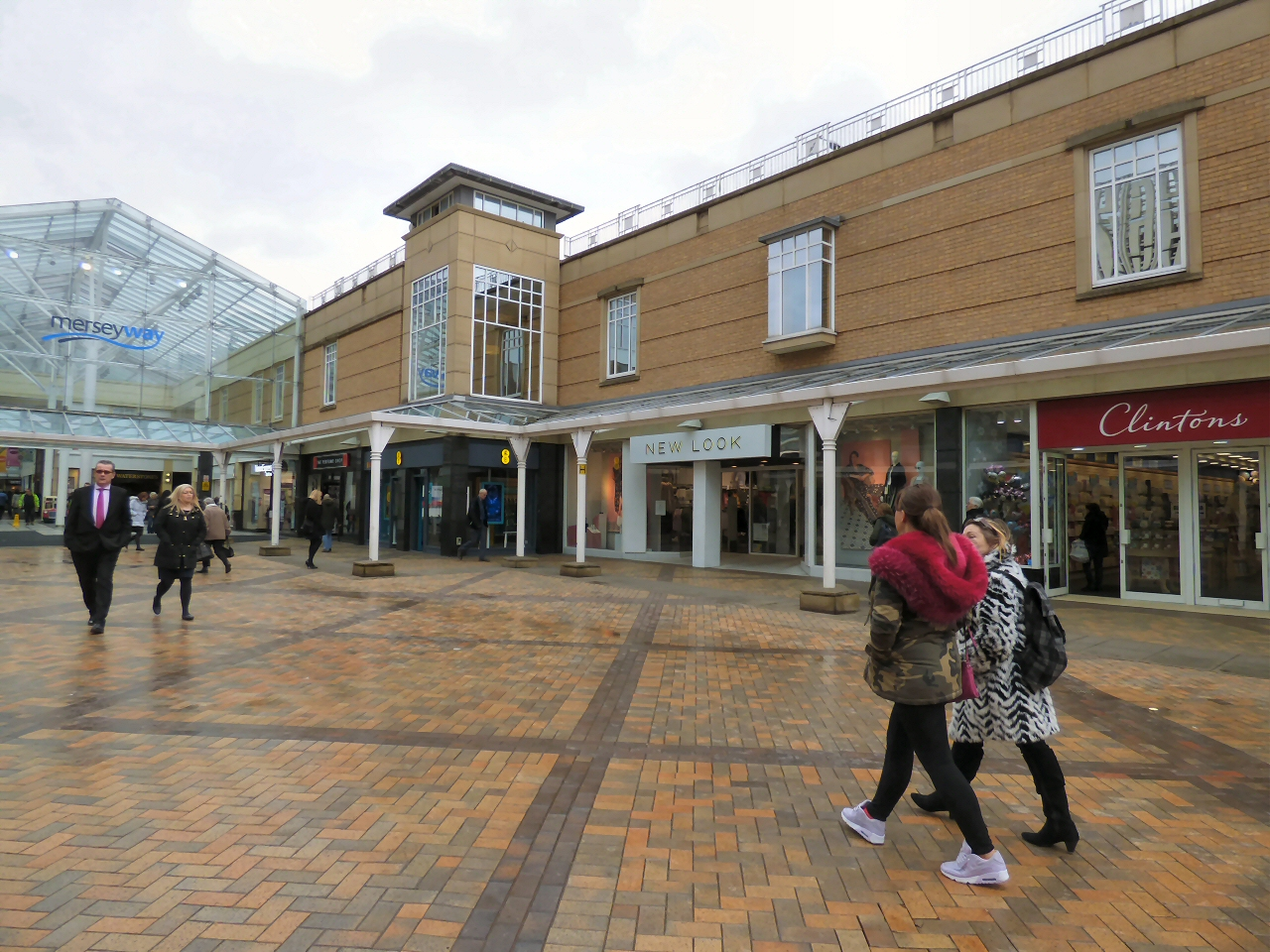
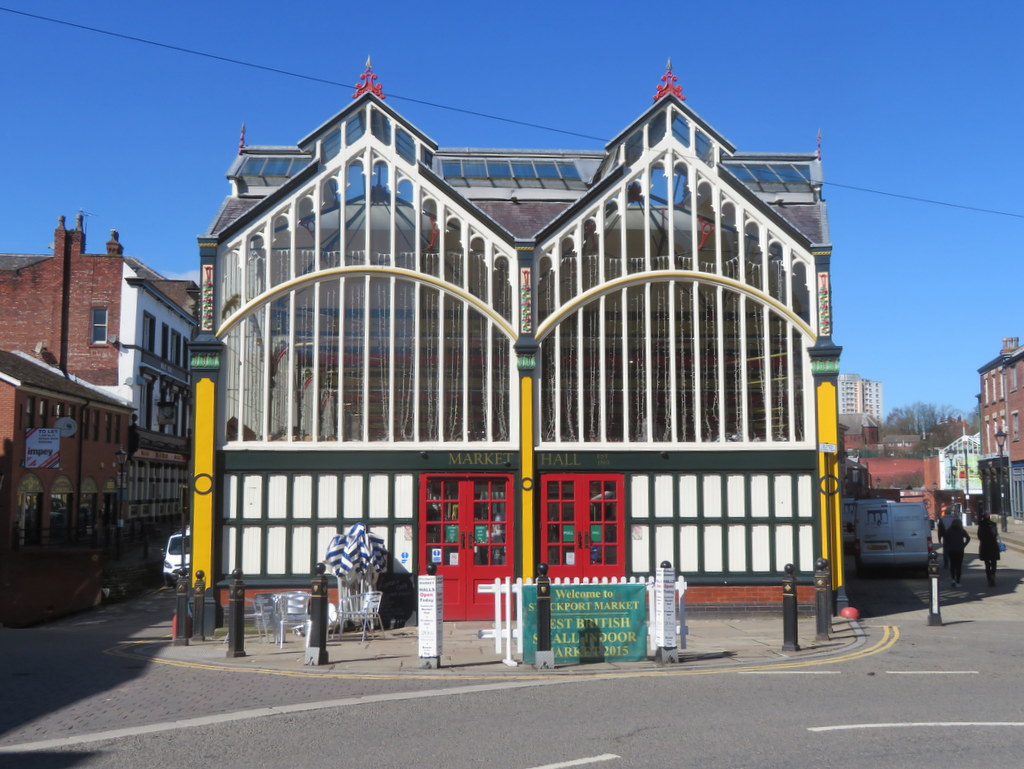
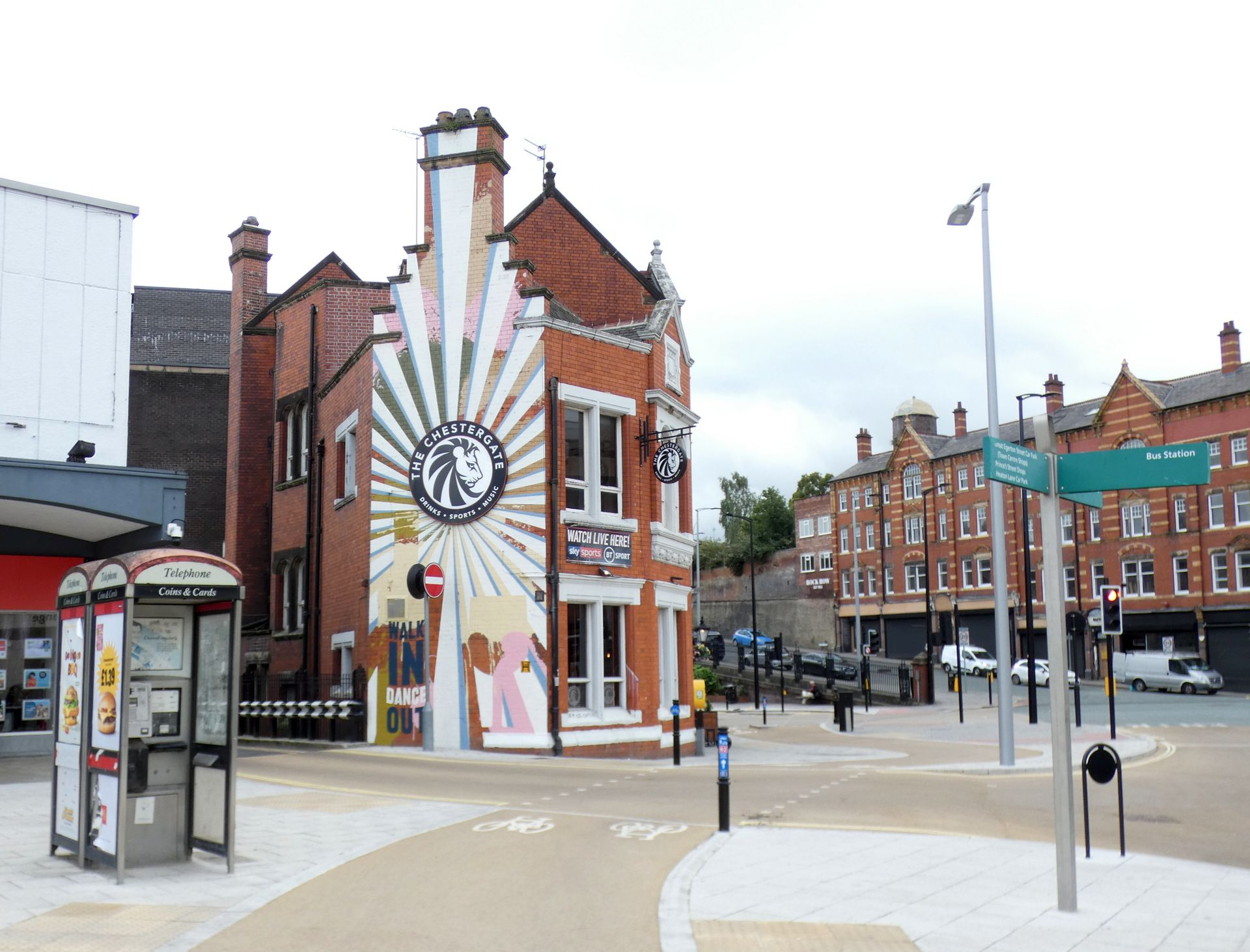
- St Mary's Church Town Hall Stockport Viaduct Merseyway Market Hall Chestergate

- Location within Greater Manchester
- Population: 117,935 (built up area, 2021 census); 294,773 (borough, 2021 census)
- Demonym: Stopfordian
- OS grid reference: SJ895900
  - London: 157 mi (253 km) SE
- Metropolitan borough: Stockport
- Metropolitan county: Greater Manchester
- Region: North West
- Country: England
- Sovereign state: United Kingdom
- Areas of the town: List: Adswood; Bosden Farm; Brinnington; Cheadle Hulme; Davenport; Edgeley; Heaton Chapel; Heaton Mersey; Heaton Moor; Heaton Norris; Heaviley; Offerton; Portwood; Reddish; Woodsmoor
- Post town: Stockport
- Postcode district: SK1-SK7
- Dialling code: 0161
- Police: Greater Manchester
- Fire: Greater Manchester
- Ambulance: North West
- UK Parliament: Stockport
- Website: stockport.gov.uk

Stockport is a town in Greater Manchester, England, 6 miles (10 km) south-east of Manchester, 7 miles (11 km) south-west of Ashton-under-Lyne and 12 miles (19 km) north of Macclesfield. The rivers Goyt and Tame merge to create the River Mersey here. It is the main settlement of the wider Metropolitan Borough of Stockport. At the 2021 census, the built up area as defined by the Office for National Statistics (ONS) had a population of 117,935, and the metropolitan borough had a population of 294,773.

Most of the town is within the boundaries of the historic county of Cheshire, with the area north of the Mersey in the historic county of Lancashire. Stockport in the 16th century was a small town entirely on the south bank of the Mersey, known for the cultivation of hemp and manufacture of rope. In the 18th century, it had one of the first mechanised silk factories in the British Isles. Stockport's predominant industries of the 19th century were the cotton and allied industries. It was also at the centre of the country's hatting industry, which by 1884 was exporting more than six million hats a year; the last hat works in Stockport closed in 1997. The town's main football club, Stockport County, is nicknamed the Hatters.

Dominating the western approaches to the town is Stockport Viaduct. Built in 1840, its 27 brick arches carry the main line railway through the town over the River Mersey and the M60 motorway.

== History ==
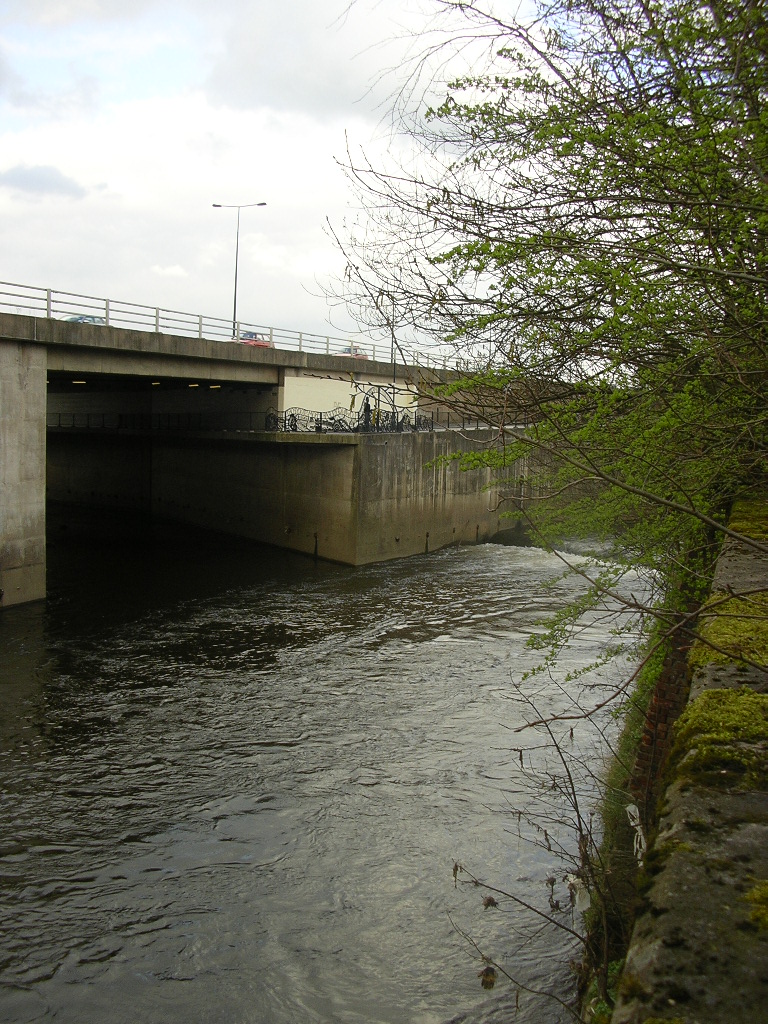
The rivers Tame (left) and Goyt (right) meeting to form the River Mersey in 2008

=== Toponymy ===
Stockport was recorded as "Stokeport" in 1170. The currently accepted etymology is Old English port, a market place, with stoc, a hamlet (but more accurately a minor settlement within an estate); hence, a market place at a hamlet. Older derivations include stock, a stockaded place or castle, with port, a wood, hence a castle in a wood. The castle probably refers to Stockport Castle, a 12th-century motte-and-bailey first mentioned in 1173.

Other derivations are based on early variants such as Stopford and Stockford. There is evidence that a ford across the River Mersey existed at the foot of Bridge Street Brow. Stopford retains a use in the adjectival form, Stopfordian, for Stockport-related items and pupils of Stockport Grammar School; it is also used as the demonym for people from Stockport.

Stockport has never been a sea or river port, as the Mersey is not navigable here; in the centre of the town, the river has been culverted and the main shopping street, Merseyway, was built above it.

=== Early history ===
The earliest evidence of human occupation in the wider area are microliths, from the hunter-gatherers of the Mesolithic period (the Middle Stone Age, about 8000–3500 BC), and weapons and stone tools from the Neolithic period (the New Stone Age, 3500–2000 BC). Early Bronze Age (2000–1200 BC) remains include stone hammers, flint knives, palstaves (bronze axe heads) and funerary urns; all finds were chance discoveries, not the results of systematic searches of a known site. There is a gap in the age of finds between about 1200 BC and the start of the Roman period in about 70 AD, which may indicate depopulation, possibly due to a poorer climate.

Despite a strong local tradition, there is little evidence of a Roman military station at Stockport. It is assumed that roads from Cheadle to Ardotalia (Melandra) and Manchester to Buxton crossed close to the town centre. The preferred site is at a ford over the Mersey, known to be paved in the 18th century, but it has never been proved that this or any roads in the area are Roman. In 1892, Hegginbotham reported the discovery of Roman mosaics at Castle Hill (around Stockport market) in the late 18th century, during the construction of a mill, but noted it was "founded on tradition only"; substantial stonework has never been dated by modern methods. However, Roman coins and pottery were probably found there during the 18th century. A cache of coins dating from 375 to 378 AD may have come from the banks of the Mersey at Daw Bank; these were possibly buried for safekeeping at the side of a road.

Six coins from the reigns of the Anglo-Saxon English Kings Edmund (reigned 939–946) and Eadred (reigned 946–955) were found during ploughing at Reddish Green in 1789. There are contrasting views about the significance of this; Arrowsmith takes this as evidence for the existence of a settlement at that time, but Morris states the find could be "an isolated incident". The small cache is the only Anglo-Saxon find in the area. However, the etymology Stoc-port suggests inhabitation during this period.

=== Medieval and early modern period ===
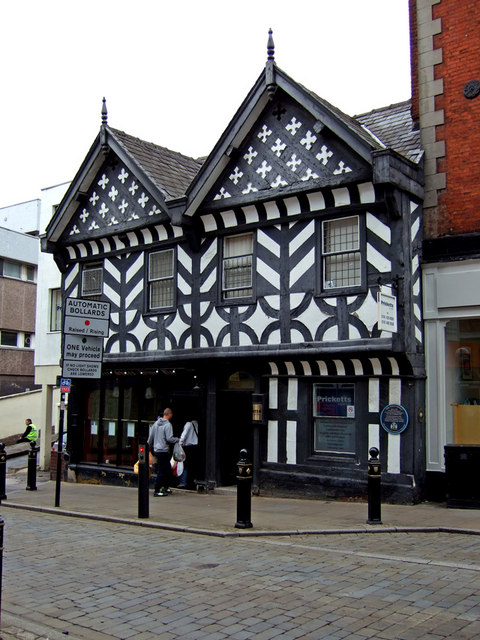
The Three Shires, built in 1580, now Brew 32

No part of Stockport appears in the Domesday Book of 1086. The area north of the Mersey was part of the hundred of Salford, which was poorly surveyed. The area south of the Mersey was part of the Hamestan hundred. Cheadle, Bramhall, Bredbury and Romiley are mentioned, but these all lay just outside the town limits. The survey includes valuations of the Salford hundred as a whole and Cheadle for the times of Edward the Confessor, just before the Norman invasion of 1066, and the time of the survey. The reduction in value is taken as evidence of destruction by William the Conqueror's men in the campaigns generally known as the Harrying of the North. The omission of Stockport was once taken as evidence that destruction was so complete that a survey was not needed.

Arrowsmith argues from the etymology that Stockport may have still been a market place associated with a larger estate, and so would not be surveyed separately. The Anglo-Saxon landholders in the area were dispossessed and the land divided amongst the new Norman rulers. The first borough charter was granted in about 1220 and was the only basis for local government for six hundred years.

A castle held by Geoffrey de Costentin is recorded as a rebel stronghold against Henry II in 1173–1174 when his sons revolted. There is an incorrect local tradition that Geoffrey was the king's son, Geoffrey II of Brittany, who was one of the rebels. Dent gives the size of the castle as about 31 by 60 m (102 by 197 ft), and suggests it was similar in pattern to those at Pontefract and Launceston.

A branch of the Arden family (to which William Shakespeare is related on his mother's side) were prominent in Stockport in 1500s at Underbank Hall and Arden Hall (also known as Harden or Hawarden).

The castle was probably ruinous by the middle of the 16th century and it was agreed to demolish it in 1642. Castle Hill, possibly the motte, was levelled in 1775 to make space for Warren's mill. Nearby walls, once thought to be either part of the castle or of the town walls, are now thought to be revetments to protect the cliff face from erosion.

The regicide John Bradshaw (1602–1659) was born at Wibersley, in the parish of Stockport, baptised in the parish church and attended Stockport Free School. A lawyer, he was appointed Lord President of the High Court of Justice for the trial of King Charles I in 1649. Although he was dead by the time of the Restoration in 1660, his body was brought up from Westminster Abbey and hanged in its coffin at Tyburn.

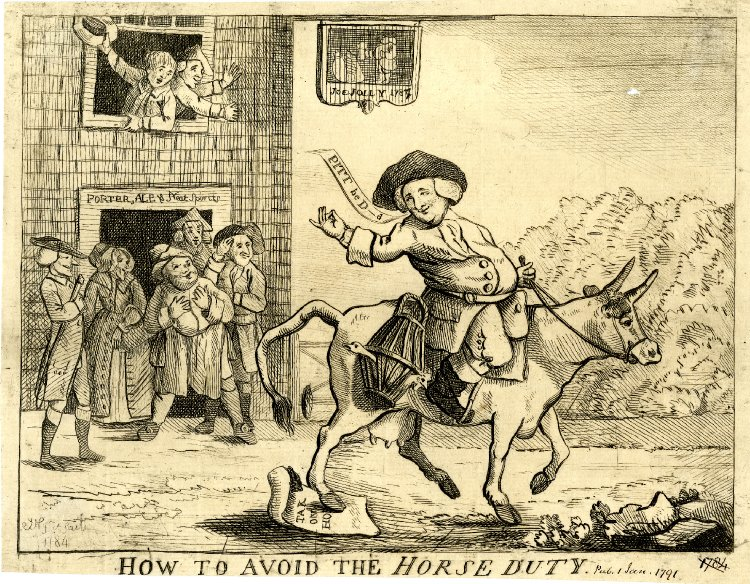
A satirical print from 1784 of Jonathan Thatcher, a Cheshire farmer, riding his cow to Stockport market in protest at Pitt the Younger's 1784 budget, which introduced taxes on horse ownership

Stockport bridge has been documented as existing since at least 1282. During the English Civil War, the town was supportive of Parliament and was garrisoned by local militias of around 3,000 men commanded by Majors Mainwaring and Duckenfield. Prince Rupert advanced on the town on 25 May 1644, with 8–10,000 men and 50 guns, with a brief skirmish at the site of the bridge, in which Colonel Washington's dragoons led the Royalist attack. Rupert continued his march via Manchester and Bolton to meet defeat at Marston Moor near York. Stockport bridge was pulled down in 1745 and trenches were additionally dug in the fords to try to stop the Jacobite army of Charles Edward Stuart as they marched through the town on the way to Derby. The vanguard was shot at by the town guard and a horse was killed. The army also passed through Stockport on their retreat back from Derby to Scotland.

One of the legends of the town is that of Cheshire farmer, Jonathan Thatcher, who, in a 1784 demonstration against taxation, avoided William Pitt the Younger's saddle tax on horses by riding to market at Stockport on an ox. The incident is also celebrated in "The Glass Umbrella" in St Petersgate Gardens, one of the works on Stockport's Arts Trail.

=== Industrialisation ===
"At this place poverty is not much felt except by those who are idle, for all persons capable of tying knots may find work in the silk mills ... children of six years earn a shilling a week and more as they grow capable of deserving it."

— Anon, 1769.

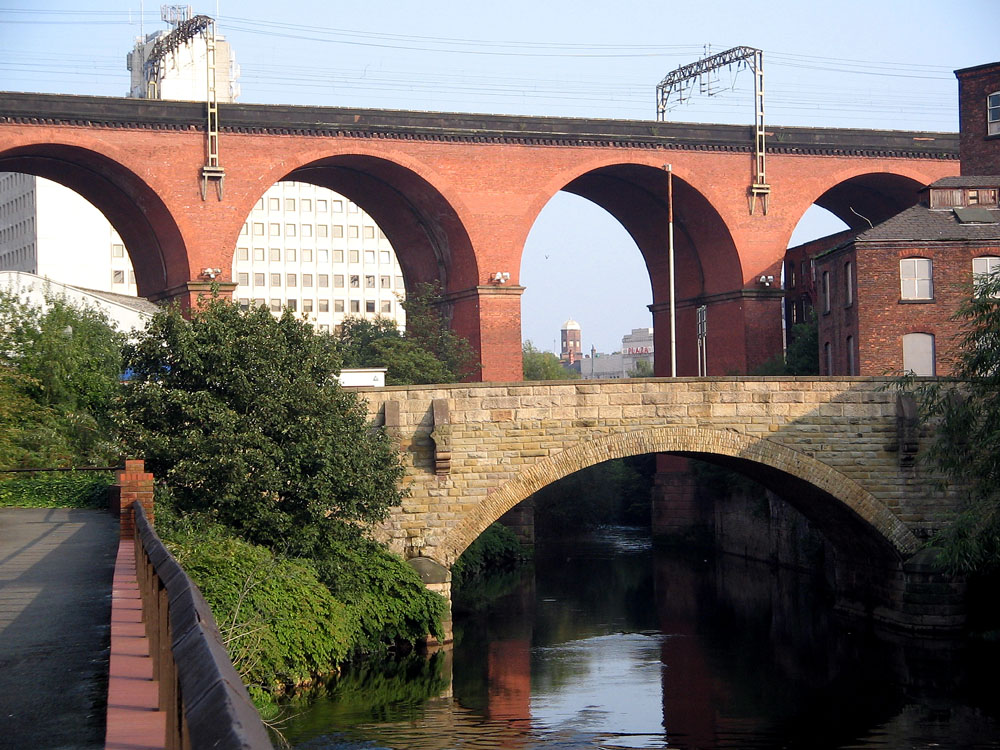
The Stockport railway viaduct over the River Mersey in 2006

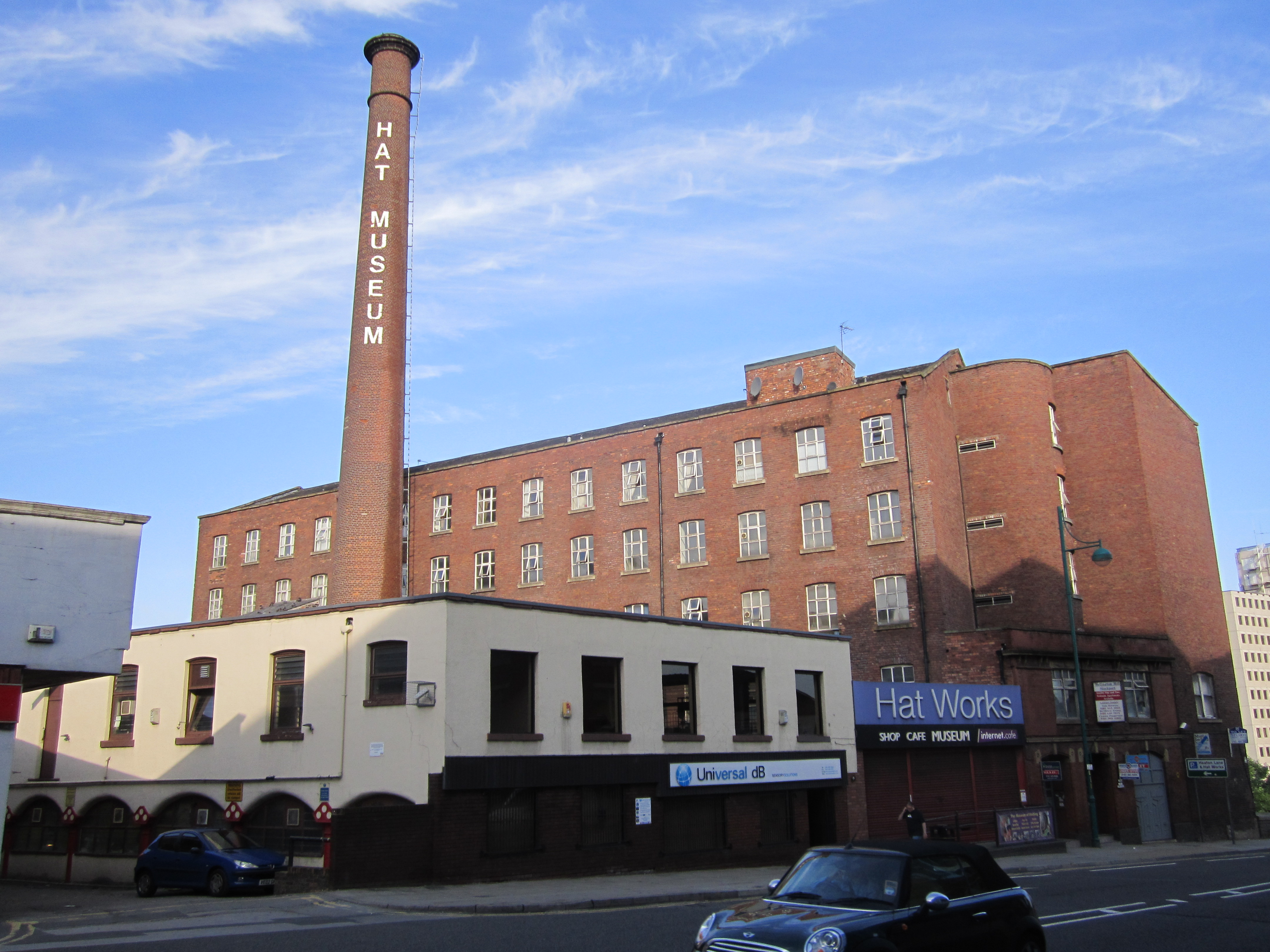
Stockport Hat Works in 2012

Hat making was established in north Cheshire and south-east Lancashire by the 16th century. From the 17th century, Stockport became a centre for the hatting industry and later the silk industry. The town expanded rapidly during the Industrial Revolution, helped particularly by the growth of the cotton manufacturing industries. However, economic growth took its toll and 19th century philosopher, social and political theorist Friedrich Engels wrote in 1844 that Stockport was "renowned as one of the duskiest, smokiest holes" in the whole of the industrial area.

Stockport was one of the prototype textile towns. In the early 18th century, England was not capable of producing silk of sufficient quality to be used as the warp in woven fabrics. Suitable thread had to be imported from Italy, where it was spun on water-powered machinery. In about 1717, silk spinner John Lombe travelled to Italy and copied the design of the machinery. On his return, he obtained a patent on the design and went into production in Derby. When Lombe tried to renew his patent in 1732, silk spinners from towns including Manchester, Macclesfield, Leek and Stockport successfully petitioned parliament to not renew the patent. Lombe was paid off and Stockport's first silk mill (the first water-powered textile mill in the north-west of England) was opened in 1732, on a bend in the Mersey. Further mills were opened on local brooks.

Silk weaving expanded until two thousand people were employed in the industry in 1769. By 1772, the boom had turned to bust, possibly due to cheaper foreign imports; by the late 1770s, trade had recovered. The cycle of boom and bust would continue throughout the textile era.

The combination of a good water power site (described by Rodgers as "by far the finest of any site within the lowland" [of the Manchester region]) and a workforce used to textile factory work meant Stockport was well placed to take advantage of the phenomenal expansion in cotton processing in the late 18th century. Warren's mill in the Market Place was the first. Power came from an undershot water wheel in a deep pit, fed by a tunnel from the River Goyt. The positioning on high ground, unusual for a water-powered mill, contributed to an early demise, but the concept of moving water around in tunnels proved successful and several tunnels were driven under the town from the Goyt to power mills. In 1796, James Harrisson drove a wide cut from the Tame which fed several mills in the Park, Portwood. Other water-powered mills were built on the Mersey.

The town was connected to the national canal network by the 5 miles (8.0 km) of the Stockport branch of the Ashton Canal opened in 1797, which continued in use until the 1930s. Much of it is now filled in, but there is an active campaign to reopen it for leisure uses.

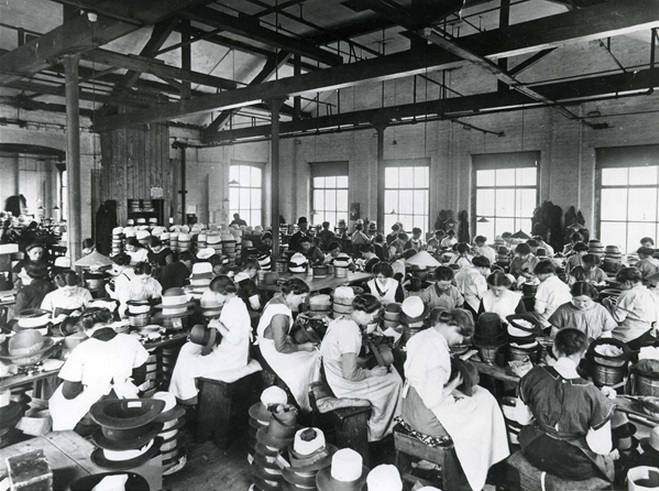
Hatters working in Battersby Hat Works, c. 1910

In the early 19th century, the number of hatters in the area began to increase and a reputation for high quality work was created. The London firm of Miller Christy bought out a local firm in 1826, a move described by Arrowsmith as a "watershed". By the latter part of the century, hatting had changed from a manual to a mechanised process and was one of Stockport's primary employers; the area, with nearby Denton, was the leading national centre. Support industries, such as blockmaking, trimmings, and leatherware, became established Stockport Armoury was completed in 1862.

The First World War cut off overseas markets, which established local industries and eroded Stockport's eminence. Even so, more than 3,000 people worked in the hatting industry in 1932, making it the third biggest employer after textiles and engineering. The Great Depression (1929–1939) and changes in fashion greatly reduced the demand for hats; the demand that existed was met by cheaper wool products made elsewhere, such as the Luton area.

In 1966, the largest of the region's remaining felt hat manufacturers, Battersby & Co, T & W Lees, J. Moores & Sons, and Joseph Wilson & Sons, merged with Christy & Co to form Associated British Hat Manufacturers, leaving Christy's and Wilson's (at Denton) as the last two factories in production. The Wilson's factory closed in 1980, followed by the Christy's factory in 1997, bringing to an end over 400 years of hatting in the area. The industry is commemorated by the UK's only dedicated hatting museum, Hat Works.

=== Recent history ===
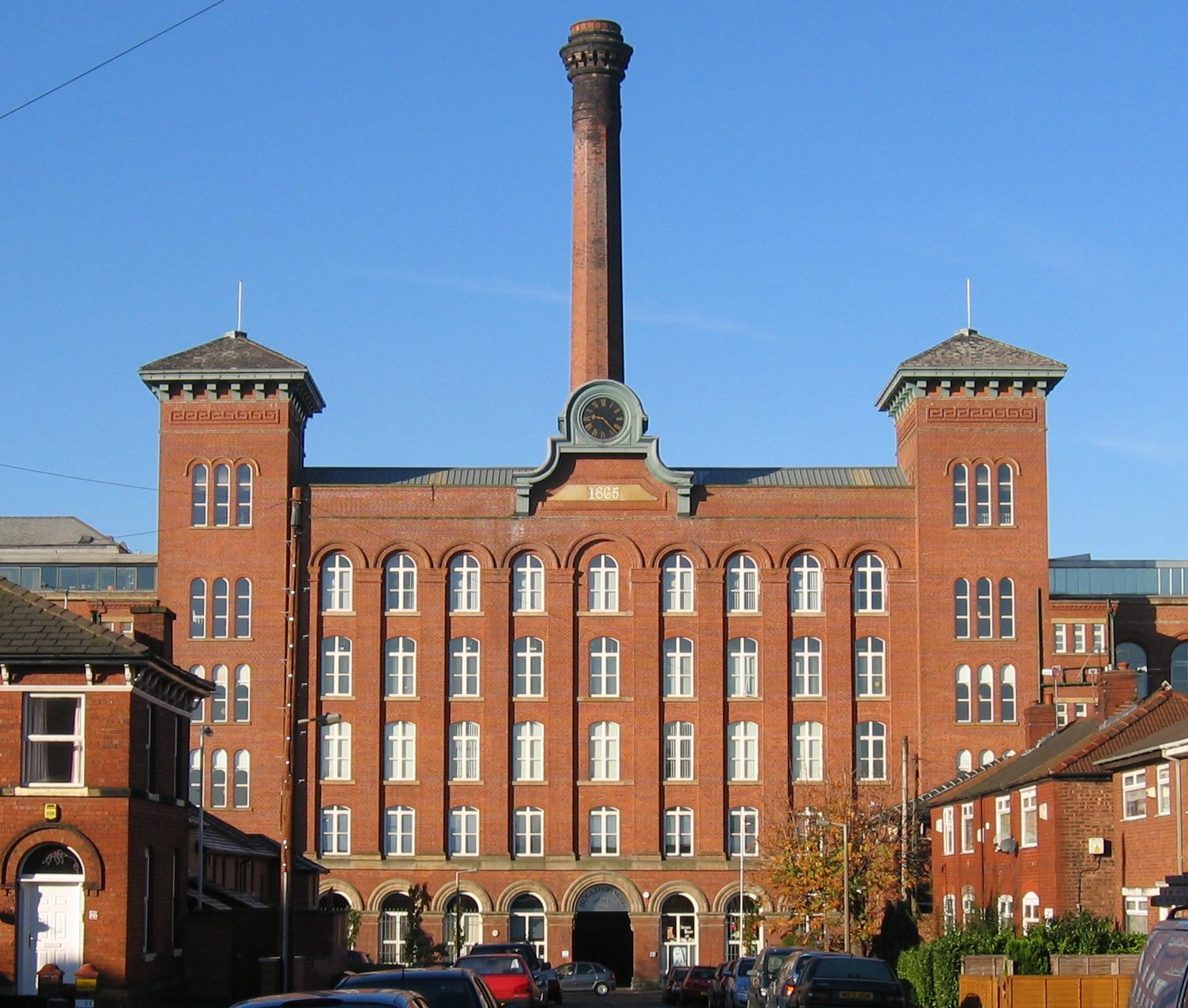
Houldsworth Mill in Reddish, 2006

Since the start of the 20th century, Stockport has moved away from being a town dependent on cotton and its allied industries to one with a varied base. It makes the most of its varied heritage attractions, including a national museum of hatting, a unique system of Second World War air raid tunnel shelters in the town centre and a late medieval merchants' house on the 700-year-old Market Place.

In 1967, the Stockport air disaster occurred; a British Midland Airways Canadair C-4 Argonaut aeroplane crashed in the Hopes Carr area of the town, resulting in 72 deaths among the passengers and crew.

On 23 November 1981, an F1/T2 tornado formed over Cheadle Hulme. It subsequently passed over Stockport town centre.

In 2011, Stockport Metropolitan Borough Council (SMBC) embarked on an ambitious regeneration scheme, known as Future Stockport. The plan aimed to bring more than 3,000 residents into the centre of the town, and revitalise its residential property and retail markets in a similar fashion to the nearby city of Manchester. Many ex-industrial areas around the town's core will be brought back into productive use as mixed-use residential and commercial developments. Property development company FreshStart Living has been involved in redeveloping a former mill building in the town centre, St Thomas Place. The company plan to transform the mill into 51 residential apartments, as part of the regeneration of Stockport.

== Governance ==
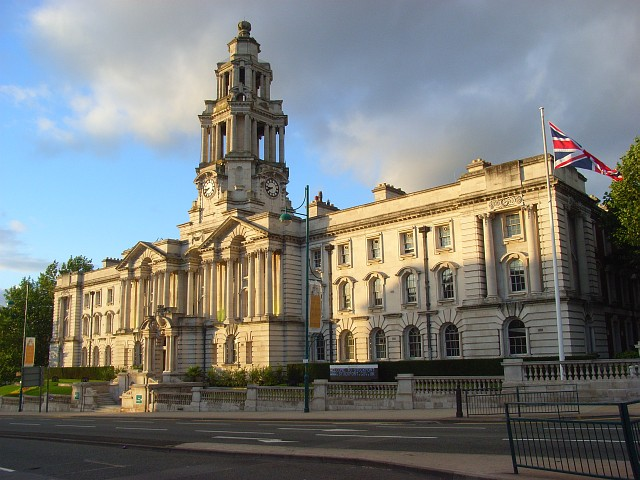
Stockport Town Hall in 2008

There is one main tier of local government covering Stockport, at metropolitan borough level: Stockport Metropolitan Borough Council (SMBC), which meets at Stockport Town Hall on Wellington Road South, and has its main offices in the adjoining Stopford House and Fred Perry House. The council is a member of the Greater Manchester Combined Authority, led by the directly elected mayor of Greater Manchester.

=== Administrative history ===
Stockport was an ancient parish in the Macclesfield Hundred of Cheshire. The parish was large, being sub-divided into fourteen townships: Bramhall, Bredbury, Brinnington, Disley, Dukinfield, Hyde, Marple, Norbury, Offerton, Romiley, Stockport Etchells, Torkington, Werneth and a Stockport township covering the central part of the parish including the town itself. The townships were all made separate civil parishes in 1866.

The Stockport township was an ancient borough, having been made a borough during the reign of Henry III (reigned 1216–1272). A Stockport parliamentary borough (constituency) was created in 1832, covering the old borough of Stockport, part of the township of Brinnington, the hamlets of Brinksway and Edgeley from the parish of Cheadle, and part of the township of Heaton Norris; the latter was on the north side of the River Mersey and forming part of the ancient parish of Manchester in Lancashire.

Stockport was reformed to become a municipal borough in 1836 under the Municipal Corporations Act 1835, which standardised how most boroughs operated across the country. As part of that reform, the borough boundaries were enlarged to match the recently created constituency. The borough of Stockport therefore straddled Cheshire and Lancashire from 1836 onwards.

Under the terms of the Poor Law Amendment Act 1834, Stockport Poor Law Union was established on 3 February 1837 and was responsible for an area covering 16 parishes or townships (mostly from the old parish of Stockport) with a total population of 68,906. Stockport Union built a workhouse at Shaw Heath in 1841.

When elected county councils were established in 1889, Stockport was considered large enough to provide its own county-level services, and so it was made a county borough, independent from both Cheshire County Council and Lancashire County Council. The borough boundaries were enlarged several times, notably absorbing the urban districts of Reddish in 1901 and Heaton Norris in 1913. It continued to straddle the geographical counties of Cheshire and Lancashire until 1974, although it was placed entirely in Lancashire for judicial purposes in 1956.

In 1974, under the Local Government Act 1972, the old County Borough of Stockport was amalgamated with neighbouring districts to form the Metropolitan Borough of Stockport in the metropolitan county of Greater Manchester. In 1986, Greater Manchester County Council was abolished and Stockport Metropolitan Borough Council assumed its functions, with some services being provided by joint committees.

In 2011, Stockport's bid for city status as part of the 2012 Queen's Diamond Jubilee celebrations was unsuccessful.

=== Parliamentary representation ===
There are three parliamentary constituencies in the Stockport Metropolitan Borough: Stockport, Cheadle and Hazel Grove. Stockport has been represented by the Labour MP Navendu Mishra since 2019; the Liberal Democrats' Tom Morrison and Lisa Smart have represented Cheadle and Hazel Grove respectively since 2024.

== Geography ==
Stockport

Climate chart (precipitation, max. and min. temperature)
J	F	M	A	M	J	J	A	S	O	N	D
70 6 1	50 7 1	60 9 3	50 12 4	60 15 7	70 18 10	70 20 12	80 20 12	70 17 10	80 14 8	80 9 4	80 7 2
- █ Average max. and min. temperatures in °C
- █ Precipitation totals in mm
- Source: Records and averages, Yahoo! Weather, 2008, archived from the original on 17 January 2002
Imperial conversion
J	F	M	A	M	J	J	A	S	O	N	D
2.8 43 34	2 45 34	2.4 48 37	2 54 39	2.4 59 45	2.8 64 50	2.8 68 54	3.1 68 54	2.8 63 50	3.1 57 46	3.1 48 39	3.1 45 36
- █ Average max. and min. temperatures in °F
- █ Precipitation totals in inches

Stockport lies on elevated ground, (Note: At 53°24′30″N 2°8′58″W (53.408°, −2.149°)) 6.1 miles (9.8 km) south-east of Manchester city centre, at the confluence of the rivers Goyt and Tame, creating the River Mersey. It shares a common boundary with the city of Manchester.

Stockport stands on Permian sandstones and red Triassic sandstones and mudstones, mantled by thick deposits of till and pockets of sand and gravel deposited by glaciers at the end of the Last Glacial Period, some 15,000 years ago. To the extreme east is the Red Rock fault and the older rocks from the Upper Carboniferous period surface. An outcrop of coal measures extends southwards through Tameside and into Hazel Grove. The Pennines lie to the east of the town, consisting of the upland moors and Millstone Grit outcrops of sandstones and shales in the Dark Peak area of the Peak District.

== Demographics ==
Stockport ethnicity compared
2001 UK census	Stockport	Stockport MB (Note: Stockport Metropolitan Borough)	England
Total population	136,082	284,528	49,138,831
White	95.5%	95.7%	91%
Asian	2.0%	2.1%	4.6%
Black	0.5%	0.4%	2.3%
Christian	74.9%	75.4%	72%
Muslim	1.8%	1.8%	3.1%
No religion	15.3%	14.2%	15%

At the 2001 UK census, Stockport had a population of 136,082. The 2001 population density was 11,937 per mi^{2} (4,613 per km^{2}), with a 100 to 94.0 female-to-male ratio. Of those over 16 years old, 32% were single (not married) and 50.2% married. Stockport's 58,687 households included 33.1% one-person, 33.7% married couples living together, 9.7% were co-habiting couples and 10.4% single parents with their children, these figures were similar to those of Stockport Metropolitan Borough and England. Of those aged 16–74, 29.2% had no academic qualifications, significantly higher than that of 25.7% in all of Stockport Metropolitan Borough but similar to the whole of England average at 28.9%.

Although suburbs such as Woodford, Bramhall and Cheadle Hulme are relatively wealthy and 45% of the borough is green space, districts such as Edgeley, Adswood, Shaw Heath and Brinnington are among the poorer areas. In the north-west of the borough are the areas of Heaton Moor and Heaton Mersey, which together with Heaton Chapel and Heaton Norris comprise the Four Heatons.

=== Population change ===
Population growth in Stockport since 1901

Year	Pop.	±% p.a.
1901	92,832	—
1911	108,682	+1.59%
1921	123,309	+1.27%
1931	125,490	+0.18%

Year	Pop.	±% p.a.
1939	134,132	+0.84%
1951	141,650	+0.46%
1961	142,543	+0.06%
1971	139,598	−0.21%

Year	Pop.	±% p.a.
1981	136,792	−0.20%
1991	132,813	−0.29%
2001	136,082	+0.24%
2011	137,130	+0.08%

Source: County Borough 1901–1971; Urban Subdivision 1981–2001

== Economy ==
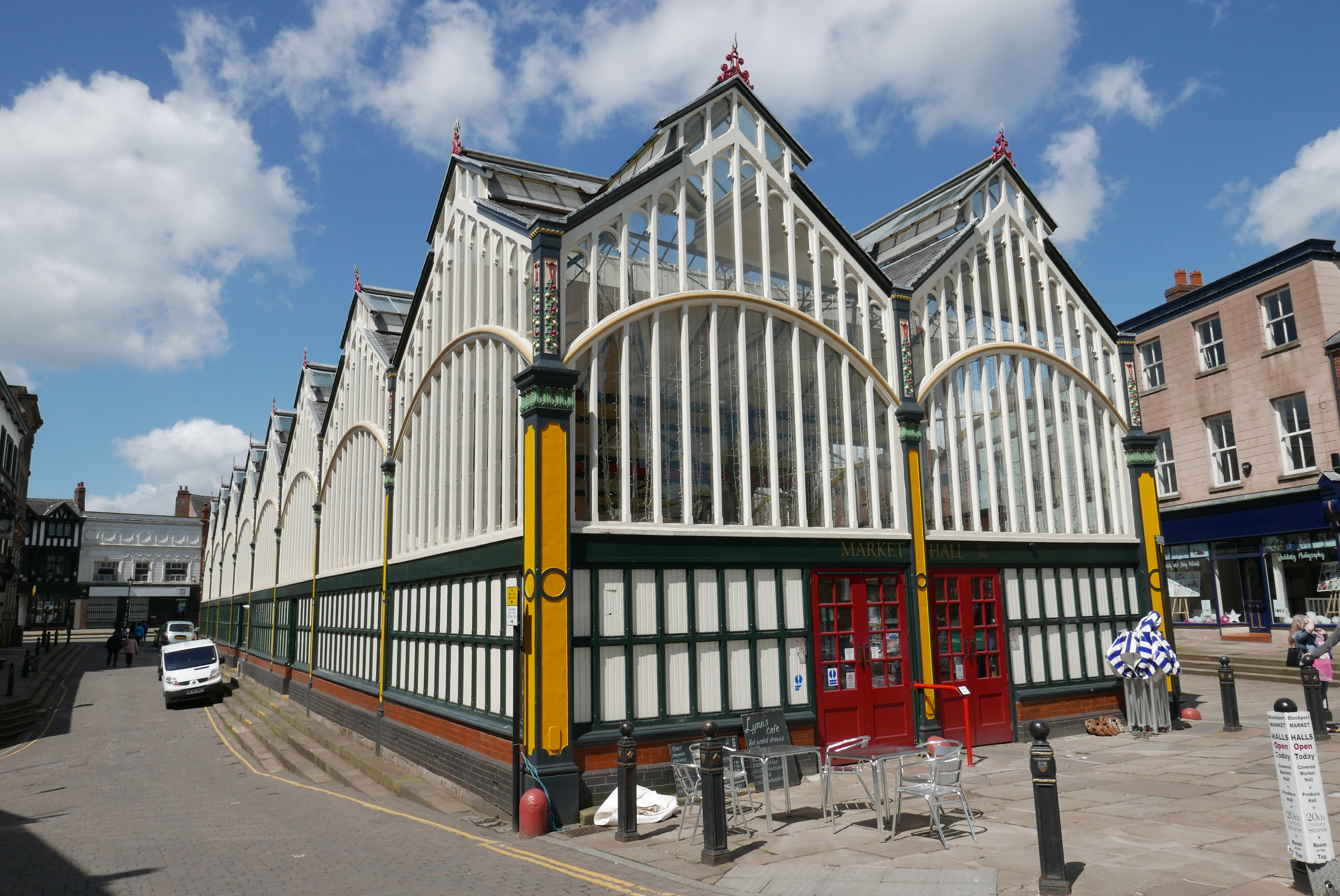
Stockport's covered market in 2018

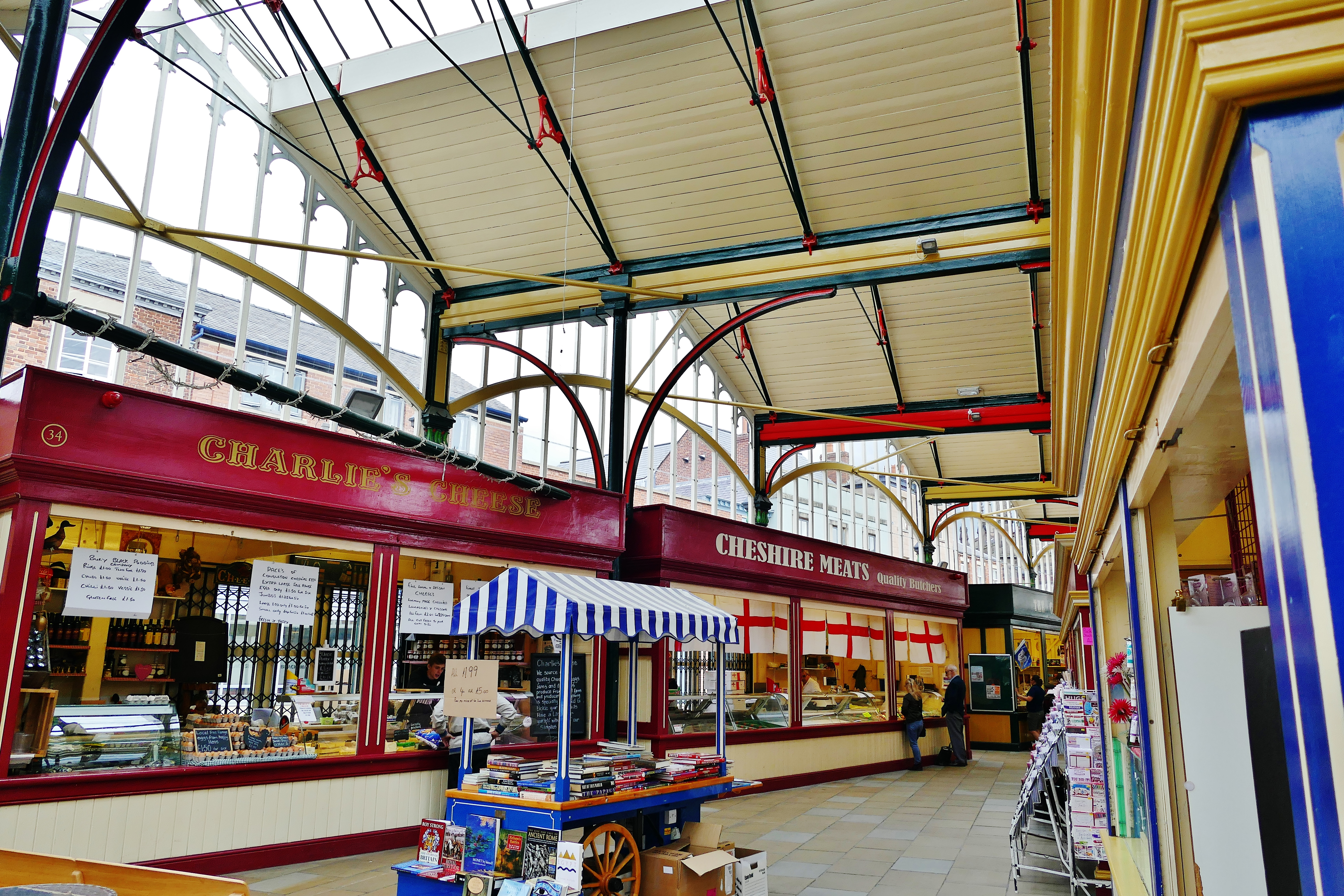
Interior of Market Hall, 2018

Stockport's principal commercial district is the town centre, with branches of most high-street stores to be found in the Merseyway Shopping Centre or The Peel Centre. Redrock Stockport has a twelve-screen cinema, bars and several restaurants. The town lies six miles (9.7 km) from Manchester, making it convenient for commuters and shoppers. In 2008, the council's £500 million plans to redevelop the town centre were cancelled after the Australian multinational construction and real estate company Lendlease pulled out of the project, blaming the credit crunch. More recently work has begun with talks of a Metrolink route to Manchester, redevelopment of the old bus station amongst many old buildings becoming luxury apartments.

== Landmarks ==
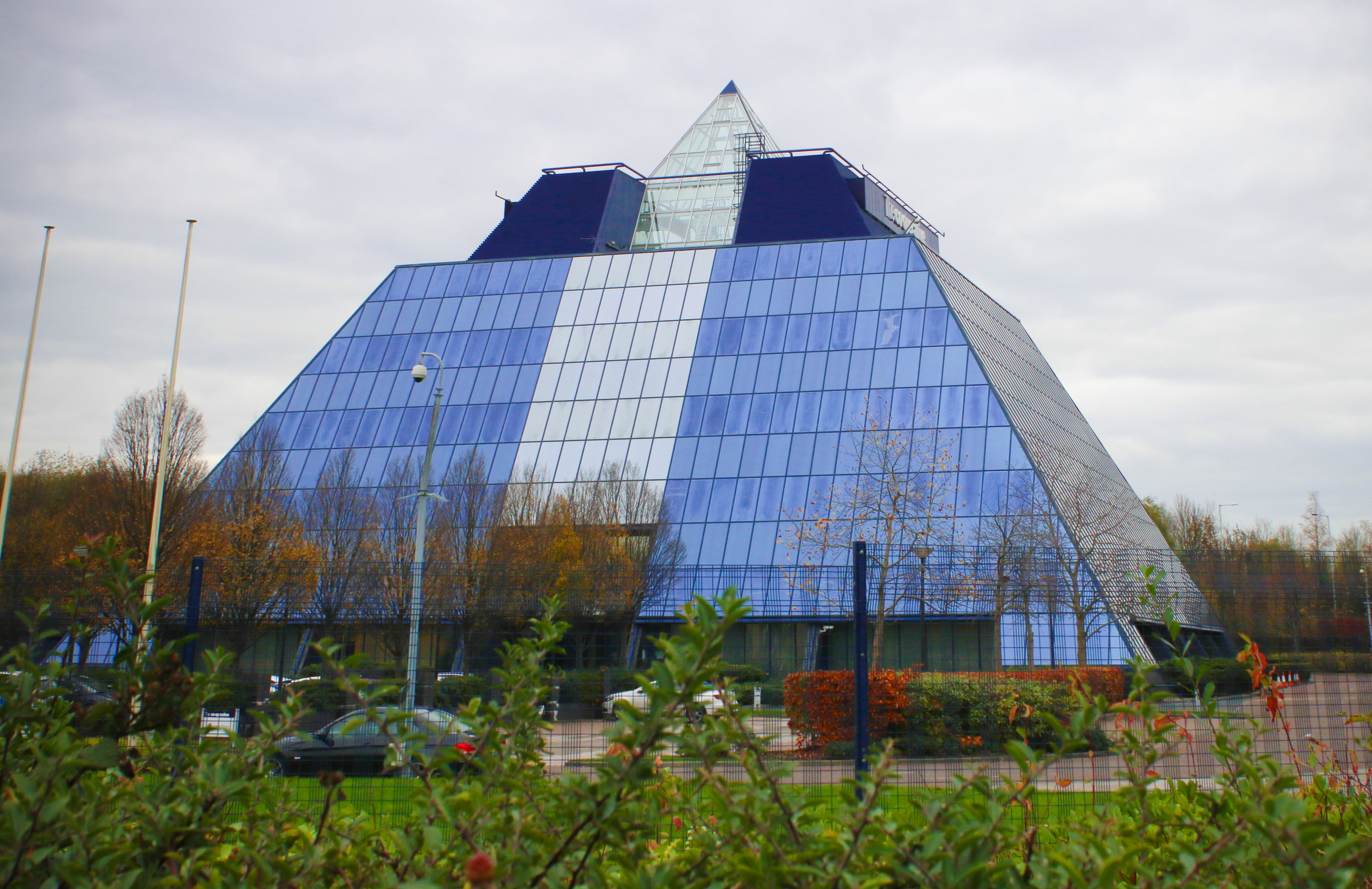
Stockport Pyramid in 2014

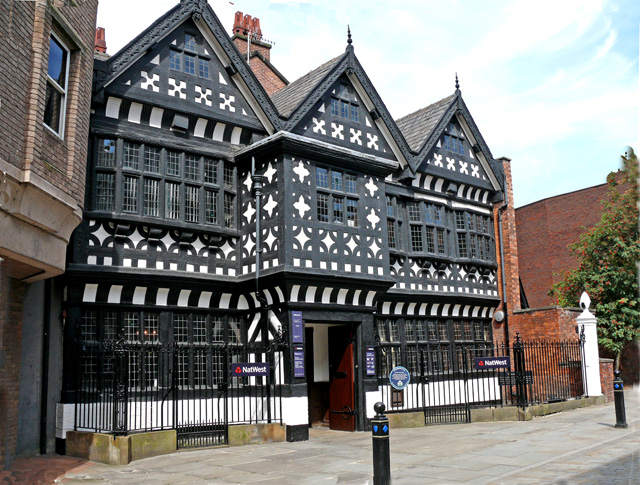
Underbank Hall in 2007

Stockport Town Hall, designed by Sir Alfred Brumwell Thomas, has a ballroom described by John Betjeman as "magnificent" which contains the Wurlitzer theatre pipe organ formerly installed in the Paramount and later Odeon Theatre in Manchester. The Stockport War Memorial Art Gallery is on Greek Street, opposite the town hall. Underbank Hall is a Grade II* listed late 16th-century timber-framed building, which was the townhouse of the Arderne family from Bredbury who occupied it until 1823. Since 1824, it has been used as a bank and its main banking hall lies behind the 16th-century structure and dates from 1915.

Stockport Viaduct is 111 feet (34 m) high; it carries four railway tracks over the River Mersey and the M60 motorway on the line to Manchester Piccadilly station. The viaduct built of 11 million bricks, a major feat of Victorian engineering, was completed in 21 months at a cost of £70,000. The structure is Grade II* listed.

Beside the motorway is the Stockport Pyramid, a distinctive structure designed by Christopher Denny from Michael Hyde and Associates. It has a steel frame, covered with mostly blue glass and clear glass panelling at the apex, and was intended to be the signature building for a much larger development planned in 1987. Construction began in the early 1990s and it was completed in 1992, but an economic downturn caused the project to be abandoned as the developers went into administration. The building lay empty until 1995 when The Co-operative Bank repossessed it and opened it as a call centre until 2018. In April 2025, the Pyramid reopened as a restaurant serving Indian and Pakistani cuisine.

Vernon Park, to the east towards Bredbury, was opened on 20 September 1858 on the anniversary of the Battle of the Alma in the Crimean War. It was named after Lord Vernon, who presented the land to the town.

St Elisabeth's Church, Reddish, and the model village are parts of a mill community designed in the main by Alfred Waterhouse for workers of Houldsworth Mill.

== Transport ==
=== Railway ===
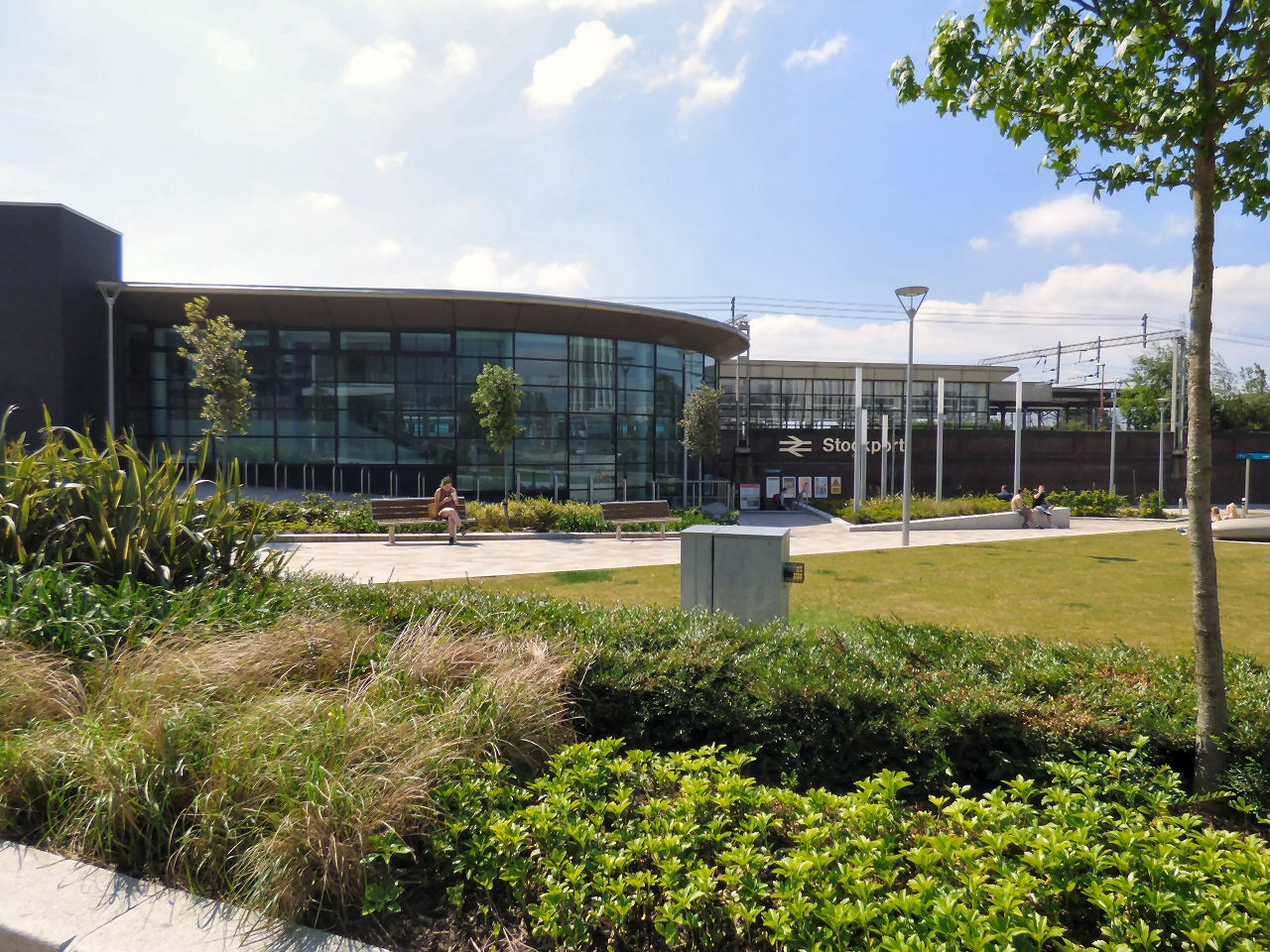
The main entrance to the railway station in 2018

Stockport railway station is a principal stop on the Manchester spur of the West Coast Main Line (WCML). It is served by six train operating companies:

- Avanti West Coast operates inter-city trains between London Euston and Manchester Piccadilly, via Macclesfield and Stoke-on-Trent, or Crewe
- CrossCountry provides inter-city services between Manchester Piccadilly and Birmingham New Street, with alternate trains continuing to Bournemouth (via Coventry and Reading) or Bristol Temple Meads / Paignton
- East Midlands Railway runs trains between Liverpool Lime Street, Manchester Piccadilly, Nottingham and Norwich
- Northern Trains operates several local routes to Manchester Piccadilly, Hazel Grove, Buxton, Chester, Stoke-on-Trent, Alderley Edge and Crewe. It also operates a weekly return parliamentary train to Stalybridge
- TransPennine Express operates services between Liverpool Lime Street, Manchester Piccadilly, Sheffield, Doncaster and Cleethorpes
- Transport for Wales Rail provides inter-city services to Cardiff Central, Swansea and Carmarthen, via Chester, Shrewsbury, Wrexham General and Hereford.

Stockport Tiviot Dale station also served the town centre between 1865 and 1967, lying on routes from Manchester Central to Marple, Liverpool Lime Street, Derby and Sheffield. Most of the station site now lies under the M60 motorway.

=== Buses ===
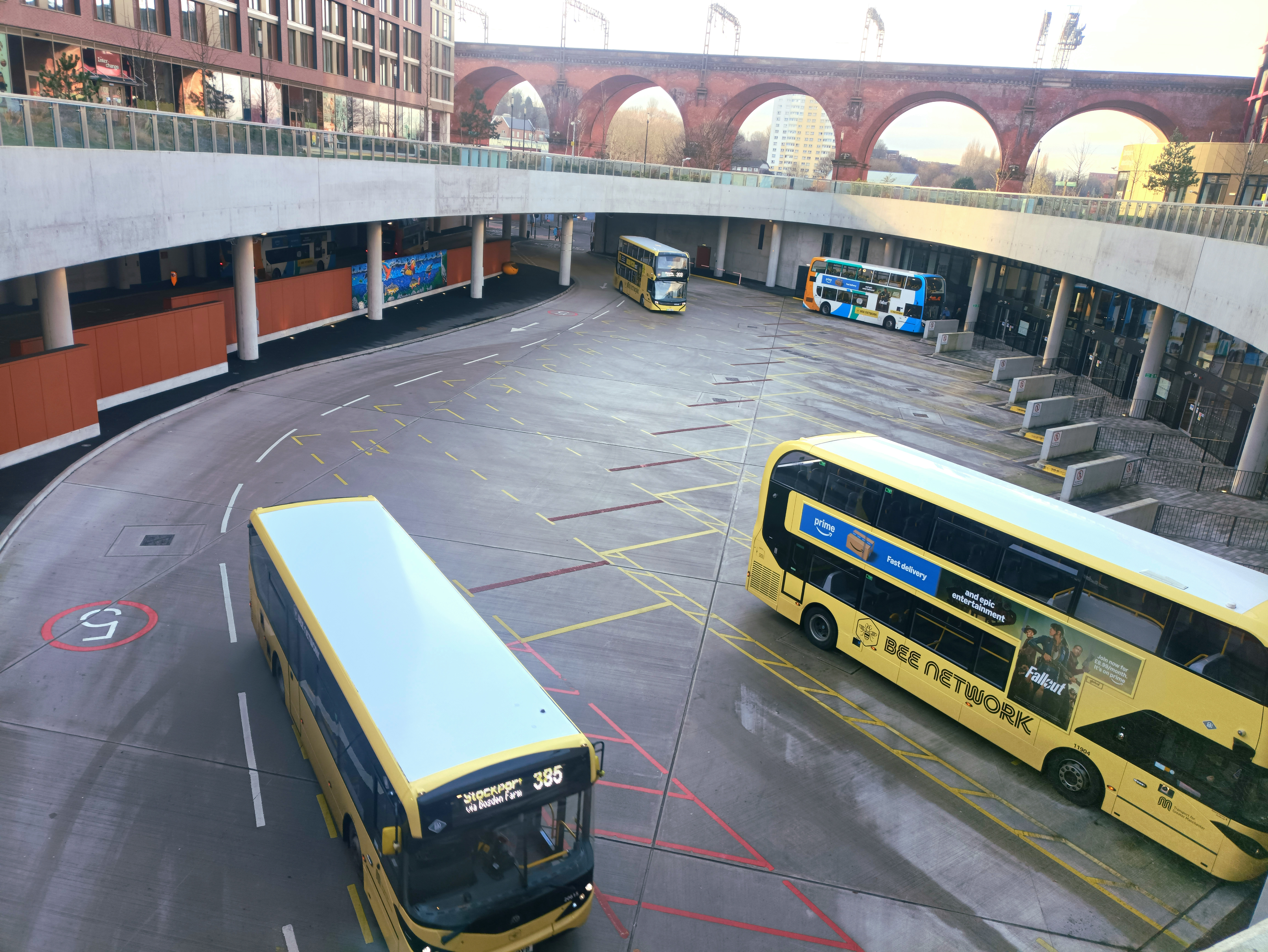
Stockport Interchange, with the viaduct in the background, 2025

Stockport bus station, which served as a terminus for many services across the borough, was one of the largest and busiest bus stations in Greater Manchester. It was demolished in late 2021 and the site is now the location of Stockport Interchange, which opened in March 2024.

Bus services are operated predominantly by Stagecoach Manchester, with routes connecting the town with its suburbs and all main locations in south Manchester including Ashton-under-Lyne, Hyde, Cheadle, Didsbury, Altrincham, the Trafford Centre and Manchester city centre.

=== Roads ===
The Manchester orbital M60 motorway and the A6, which connects Carlisle with Luton, cross at Stockport.

=== Air ===
Manchester Airport is five miles (8.0 km) south-west of the town.

== Education ==
Stockport College, a part of the Trafford College Group, is based in the town centre. Also Stockport is home to Stockport Grammar School, established in 1487.

== Religion ==
St Mary's Church, the town's oldest place of worship, was the centre of a large ecclesiastical parish covering Bramhall, Bredbury, Brinnington, Disley, Dukinfield, Hyde, Marple, Norbury, Offerton, Romiley, Stockport Etchells, Torkington and Werneth. Chapels and churches were built in those townships and the parish today covers a much smaller area. Parts of the church, situated by Market Place, date to the early 14th century. The church is Grade I listed. In the town are the Grade II listed Roman Catholic St Joseph's Church and Our Lady and the Apostles Church.

== Culture ==
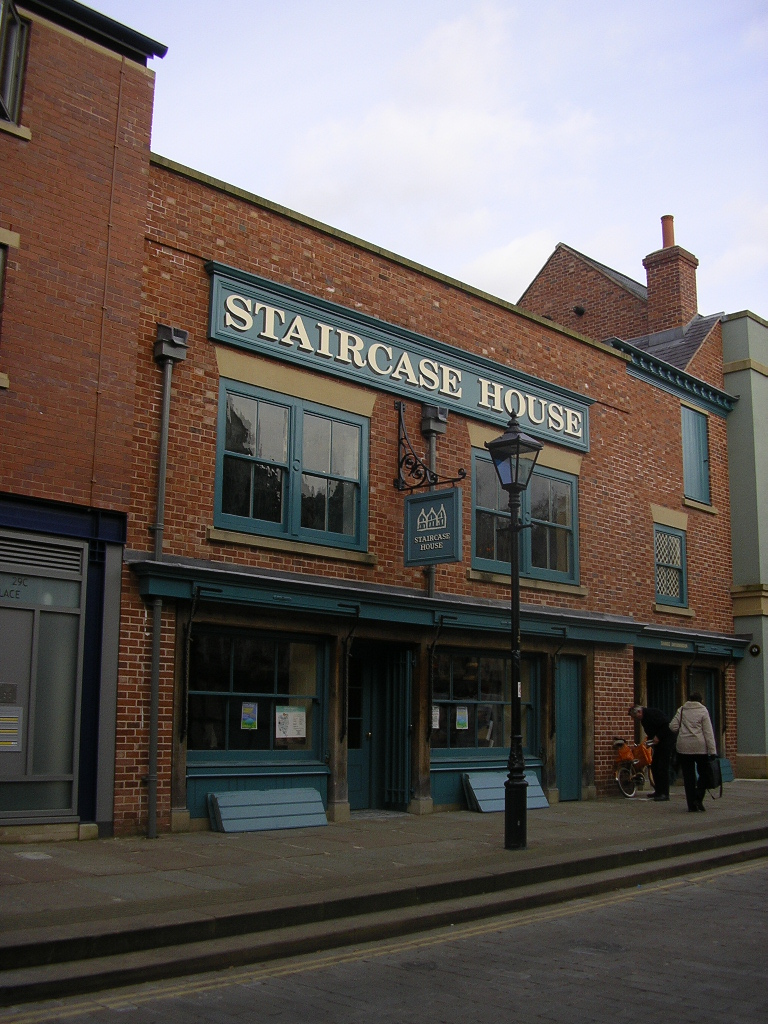
Staircase House in 2008

Stockport's museums include the Hat Works in Wellington Mill, a former hat factory, and Stockport Air Raid Shelters in the tunnels dug during the Second World War to protect inhabitants in air raids. Staircase House, a Grade II* listed medieval townhouse, houses the Stockport Story Museum. Stockport War Memorial Art Gallery hosts year-round exhibitions featuring both national and international artists.

The Plaza is a Grade II* listed cinema and variety theatre built in 1932. It is the last venue of its kind operating in its original format, making it of international significance.

In 2018, a new leisure complex opened, called Redrock Stockport, providing facilities including a cinema, restaurants, bars and a gym. In the same year, it was named by Building Design magazine as the "worst new building" in its former annual Carbuncle Cup competition.

Strawberry Studios, at no. 3 Waterloo Road, was a recording studio from 1968 to 1993; it was partly owned and used extensively by the rock band 10cc, as well as many other major artists including the Ramones, Joy Division, Neil Sedaka, Barclay James Harvest, the Smiths, the Stone Roses, the Moody Blues, the Beatles' Paul McCartney, Wax and Cliff Richard.

Local writer Simon Stephens' play Port is set in and around Stockport. It has been performed at the Royal National Theatre in London.

The painter Alan Lowndes featured Stockport scenes in his work.

The indie rock band Blossoms are from Stockport.

The BBC Radio 4 comedy programme Stockport, So Good They Named It Once was set in the town. Two series were recorded, between 1999 and 2000.

The singer Barb Jungr released an album entitled Stockport to Memphis in 2012 inspired by her memories of 1960s Stockport.

The town was 'honoured' by the single "Stockport" released in 1983 by singer and actor Frankie Vaughan (written by Geoff Morrow and recorded at the Plaza).

The 18th century composer and organist of the Manchester Collegiate Church (later Manchester Cathedral), John Wainwright, composed the hymn tune, "Yorkshire (Stockport)", to the English Christmas hymn, "Christians, awake, salute the happy morn", by poet John Byrom.

== Media ==
=== Television ===
Local news and television programmes are provided by BBC North West and ITV Granada. Television signals are received from the Winter Hill TV transmitter.

=== Radio ===
Stockport is served by the following local radio stations:

- BBC Radio Manchester
- Heart North West
- Smooth North West
- Greatest Hits Radio Manchester & The North West
- Capital Manchester and Lancashire
- Your FM, a community-based radio station which broadcasts from the town and on-line.

=== Newspapers ===
The Stockport Express, owned by Reach plc, is the town's local newspaper which publishes on Wednesdays.

== Sport ==
=== Athletics ===
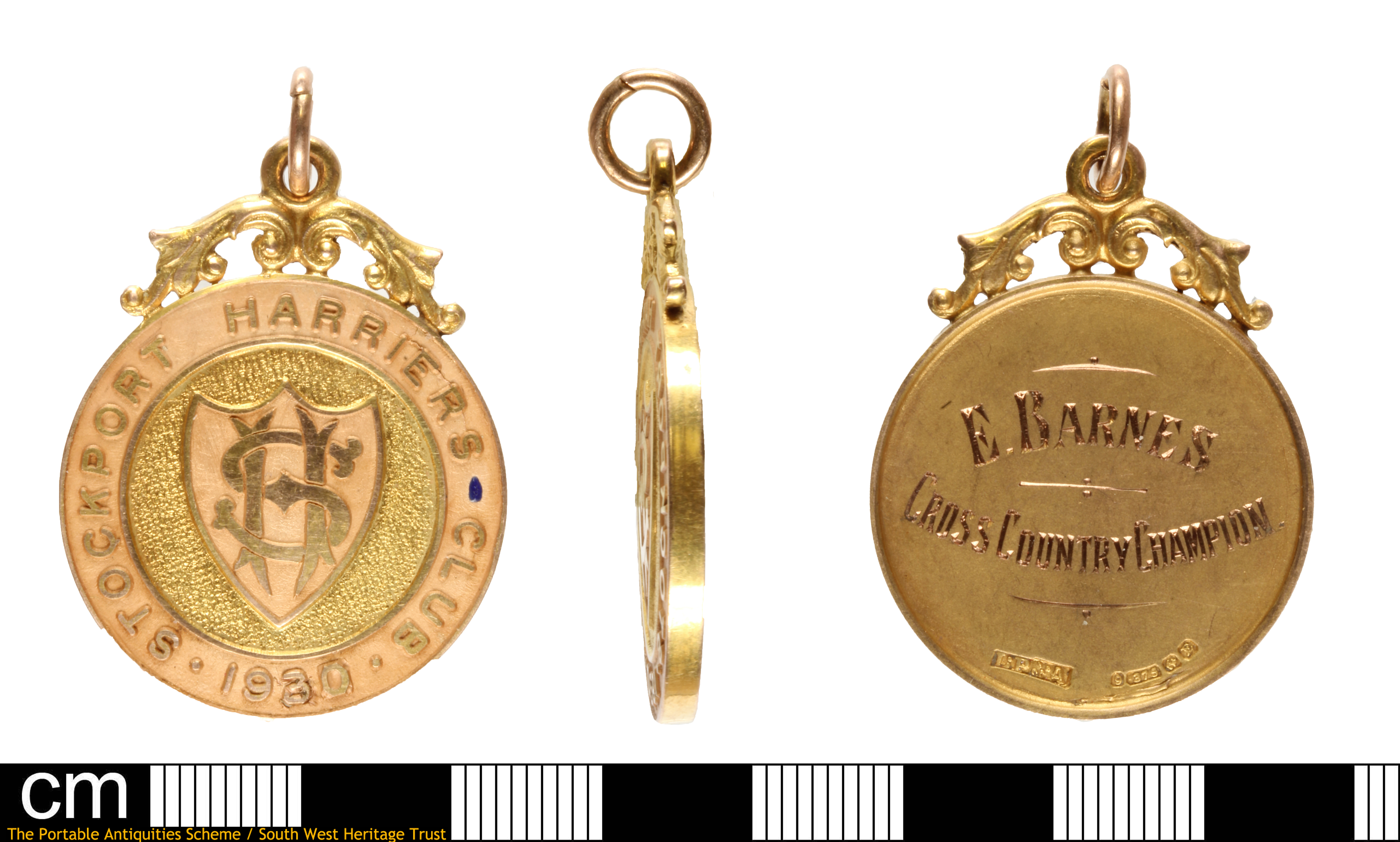
Three views of a Stockport Harriers Cross Country Champion medal, Hallmarked Birmingham 1929, awarded to E. Barnes in 1930

Stockport has three athletics clubs:

- Manchester Harriers train at William Scholes' Playing Fields in Gatley and they organise highly regarded schools cross country races throughout the winter
- Stockport Harriers are based at Woodbank Park in Offerton; they have several international middle-distance and endurance athletes
- DASH Athletics Club are the newest club in Stockport, based at both Hazel Grove Recreation Centre and the Manchester Regional Arena at Sportcity in Manchester. In 2006, DASH AC Coach Geoff Barratt was UK Athletics' Development Coach of the Year and, in 2007, the club won England Athletics North West Junior Club and North West Overall Club of the Year accolades.

=== Football ===
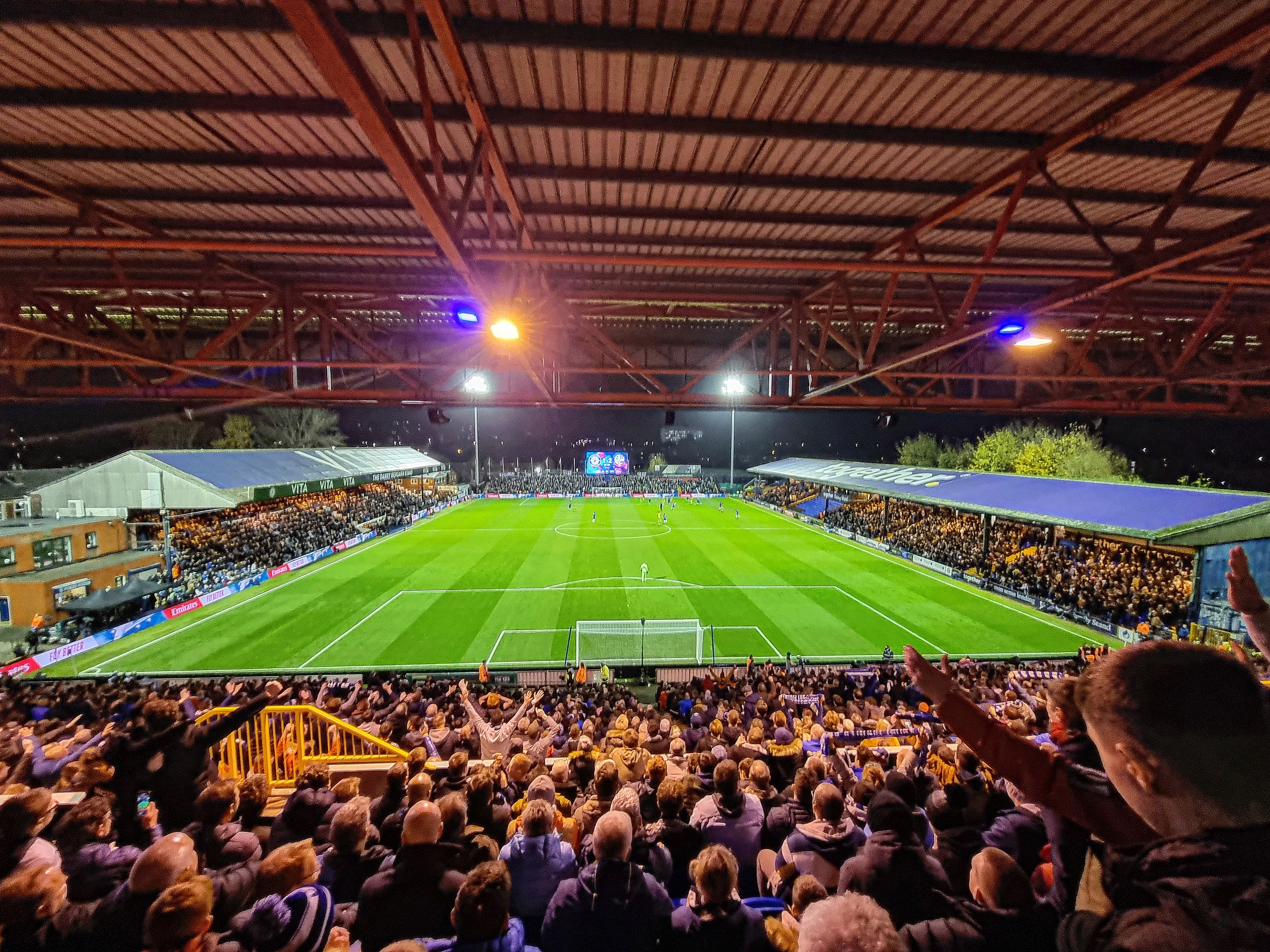
Edgeley Park, home of Stockport County F.C. in 2021

Stockport County F.C. plays in the EFL League One. The club was formed in 1883 as Heaton Norris Rovers, changing its name to Stockport County in 1890 to reflect the town's status as a county borough. It joined the English Football League (EFL) in 1900. Its most successful season was the 1996–97 season, when it reached the League Cup semi-finals and won promotion to Division One.

The town is also home to non-League clubs: Stockport Georgians A.F.C., Cheadle Heath Nomads F.C., Stockport Town F.C. and Cheadle Town F.C., which are based within the Borough of Stockport and play in the North West Counties Football League (NWCFL).

Stockport Sports F.C. (formerly Woodley Sports, and Woodley Athletic) was another non-League football club that played within the Borough. In their final season, the club competed in the NWCFL Premier Division before dissolving in 2015, due to a breach of numerous league rules.

=== Lacrosse ===
Stockport Lacrosse Club, which plays at Stockport Cricket Club in Cale Green, was founded in 1876 and its first match was played as Shaw Heath Villa. It is reputed to be the oldest club in the world and has men's, ladies' and junior teams. There are lacrosse clubs at Norbury, Cheadle, Cheadle Hulme, Heaton Mersey, Heaton Mersey Guild (now merged with Manchester Waconians) and Mellor. Stockport Grammar School Old Boys (Old Stopfordians) merged with Norbury in 2013

=== Rugby league ===
When the rugby football schism occurred in 1895, Stockport RFC, founded in 1895, became a founder member of the Northern Rugby Football Union (now Rugby Football League). Stockport played for eight seasons from the 1895–1896 season to the end of 1902–1903 season, the latter two seasons played at Edgeley Park. The club finished 17th of 22 in the initial combined league, then 5th, 11th, 11th, 9th, 12th and 6th in the 14-club Lancashire Senior Competition; it then came bottom of Division 2 of the recombined league, after which it withdrew from the Northern Rugby Football Union.

In the early 1980s, the Stockport Amateur Rugby League club played in the BARLA North West Counties League. They played at Lancashire Hill at the Three Crowns in Heaton Norris. The founder was a local postman, Graham Tonge. They wore the same colours as the original club: claret and black.

=== Rugby union ===
Sale Sharks Rugby Union Club played at Edgeley Park from 2002 to 2012, after which they moved to the CorpAcq Stadium in Barton upon Irwell, a suburb of Salford.

Manchester Rugby Union Club plays at Grove Lane in Cheadle Hulme.

=== Swimming ===
Stockport Metro Swimming Club is based at the Grand Central pool. At the 1996 Summer Olympics in Atlanta, Georgia, United States, Graeme Smith won bronze in the 1,500-metre freestyle, and, at the 2004 Summer Olympics in Athens, Greece, Steve Parry won bronze in the 200-metre butterfly. Most recently, at the 2008 Summer Olympics in Beijing, China, Keri-anne Payne and Cassie Patten won silver and bronze respectively in the 10 km open water swim.

=== Tennis ===
Stockport is the birthplace of former World No.1 tennis player Fred Perry; winner of eight Grand Slam singles titles, two Pro Slams singles titles, two doubles titles and four mixed-double titles. He was the first person to complete a Career Grand Slam and also won the Davis Cup on four consecutive occasions (1933–1936). Liam Broady and his sister Naomi Broady, the tennis professionals, were born in Stockport, attending Norris Bank Primary School and then Priestnall School.

== Twin towns ==
Stockport is twinned with:

- Béziers, France (1972)
- Heilbronn, Germany (1982)

== Freedom of the Borough ==
The following people and military units have received the Freedom of the Borough of Stockport:

=== Individuals ===
- Fred Perry: 1934
- Christopher Finney: 5 September 2007

=== Military units ===
- The Cheshire Regiment: 1969
- 1st Battalion the Mercian Regiment: 11 November 2010

== See also ==
- List of mills in Stockport
- Listed buildings in Stockport
- Stockport power station
- Healthcare in Greater Manchester
