= Stockport Pyramid =

Commercial building in Greater Manchester, England

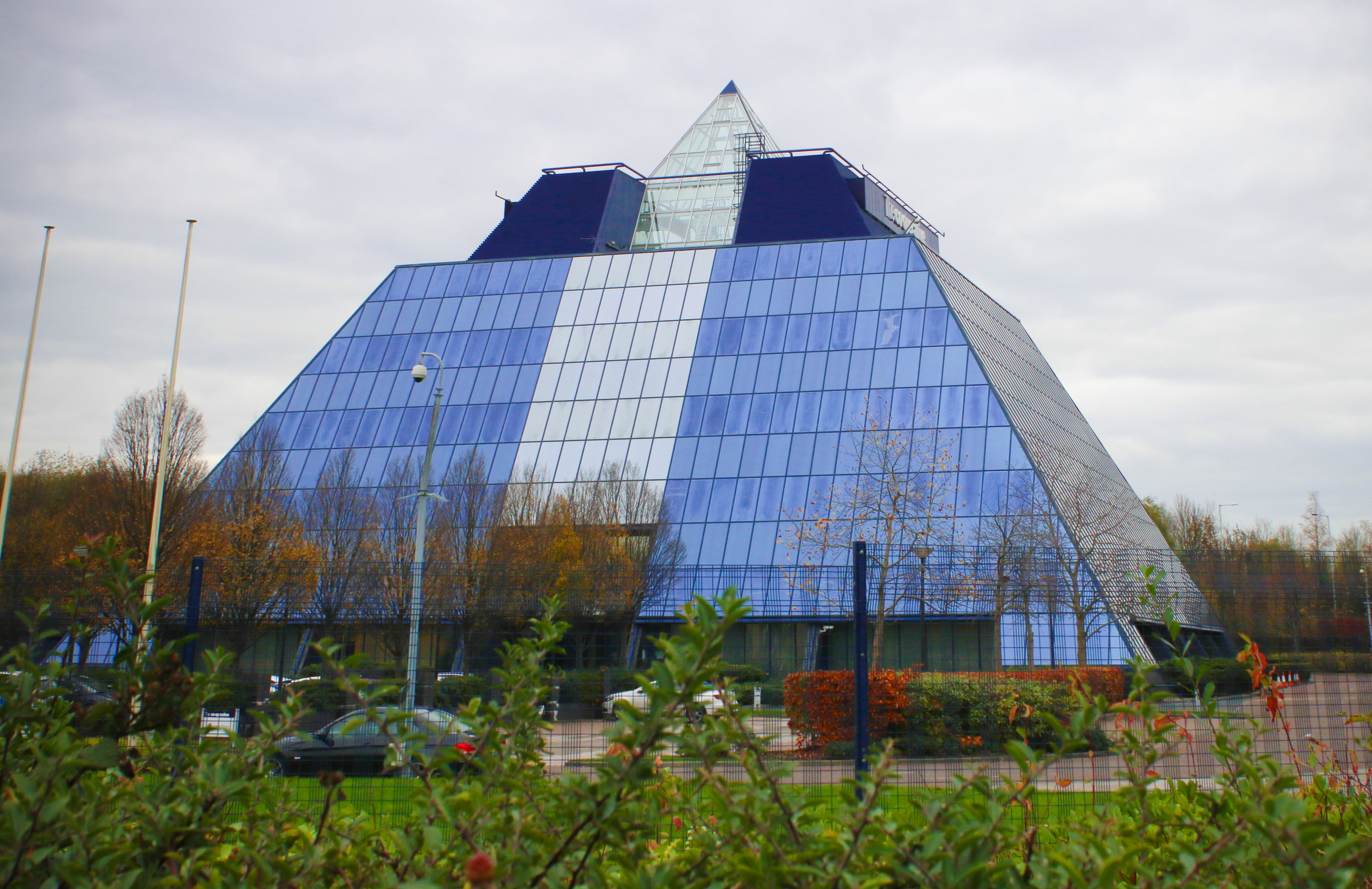
- The building in 2014

- Location within Greater Manchester

General information
- Type: Commercial offices (1992–2018); Restaurant (2025–present)
- Location: Yew Street, Stockport, Greater Manchester, England
- Coordinates: 53.4080°N 2.1754°W
- Year built: 1987–1992; 34 years ago
- Renovated: 2024–2025
- Owner: Eamar Developments

Height
- Roof: 36.6 m (120 ft)

Technical details
- Floor count: 6
- Floor area: 86,000 sq ft (8,000 m^{2})

Design and construction
- Architects: Michael Hyde and Associates

Website
- Official website

The Stockport Pyramid, also known as the Co-operative Bank Pyramid or simply The Pyramid, is a former office building on Yew Street in Stockport, Greater Manchester, England. Built in the early 1990s as part of an incomplete commercial development, it is noted for its distinctive glass‑and‑steel pyramid design. Originally occupied by the Co‑operative Bank between 1995 and 2018, the building later stood vacant for several years before being converted into an Indian and Pakistani restaurant and banqueting venue, the Royal Nawaab, which opened in April 2025.

== History ==
Stockport Pyramid was intended to be the "signature building" within a larger development scheme that originally included multiple pyramid-shaped buildings. Sources vary on the number of pyramids that were originally planned; some state two further pyramids would be built, while others state four more pyramids were planned.

The Co-operative Bank office building in 2007

Construction commenced in 1987 and was completed in 1992. During construction, the developers went into administration and the building was repossessed by The Co-operative Banking Group, who had financed the development. Between the completion of the building in 1992 and the occupancy by the Co-operative in 1995, the building was empty. It was occupied by The Co-operative Bank from 1995 until they relocated to One Angel Square in NOMA in Manchester city centre in 2018.

Several failed development projects near the site, including the pyramid's own unoccupancy immediately after construction and The Co-operative Bank's near-collapse in 2013, led to a superstitious consideration that the site was 'cursed'. The curse was announced as 'lifted' when nearby developments resumed in 2005 with the sale of office blocks in the surrounding business park.

The business park has been referred to as "The Stopfordian Valley of the Kings", "Kings Reach", or "Kings Valley".

=== Refurbishment ===
In 2019 the building was bought by the Saudi Arabian investment company Eamar Developments after being advertised for sale in the summer of 2018 for around £4.5 million. The buyer planned to let the site as office space after refurbishment.

In July 2023, the restaurant business Royal Nawaab announced plans to convert the entire building into a restaurant and banqueting hall. In September 2023, the company confirmed that the project would proceed and that the venue was expected to open in summer 2024. In October 2024, it was reported that the plans would be finalised through Stockport Council's planning committee. Planning approval for the Pyramid's conversion into an Indian and Pakistani restaurant with capacity for up to 1,500 diners was granted in November 2024. The conversion work was expected to be completed, and the restaurant opened, in April 2025. On 15 April 2025, Royal Nawaab announced a soft opening, allowing bookings for a short period between 17 April and 15 May.

== Design ==
The pyramid has been described as "avant-garde", "aspirational" and an "incongruous structure" compared to the industrial era buildings commonly found in Stockport. Contrary to it commonly being referred to as a pyramid, the Manchester Evening News claims that the building's shape is "more accurately described as a ziggurat".

== In popular culture ==
The Stockport Pyramid is the subject of a song by the local poet, spoken-word performer, musician and producer Antony Szmierek, "The Great Pyramid of Stockport". Released as a single in 2024, it appears as the third track on Szmierek's debut studio album Service Station at the End of the Universe. Szimerek has said that the pyramid has been part of his life since childhood and that the song reflects an interest in what the pyramid suggests about "the greater human experience". A signed copy of the album was purchased by the current owners shortly before the opening of the Royal Nawaab, and is displayed at the reception desk of the restaurant.

== Gallery ==
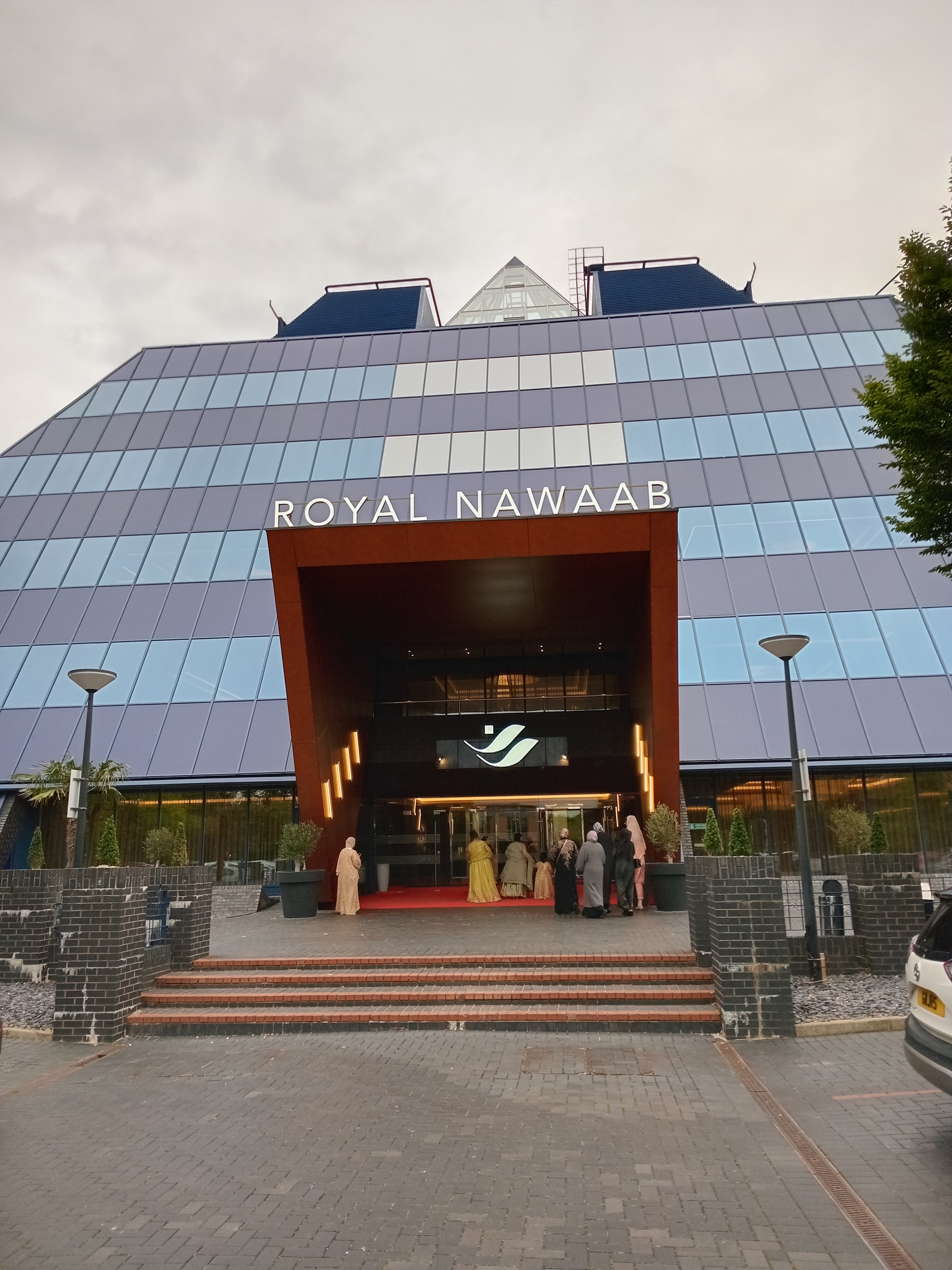
Entrance to Royal Nawaab

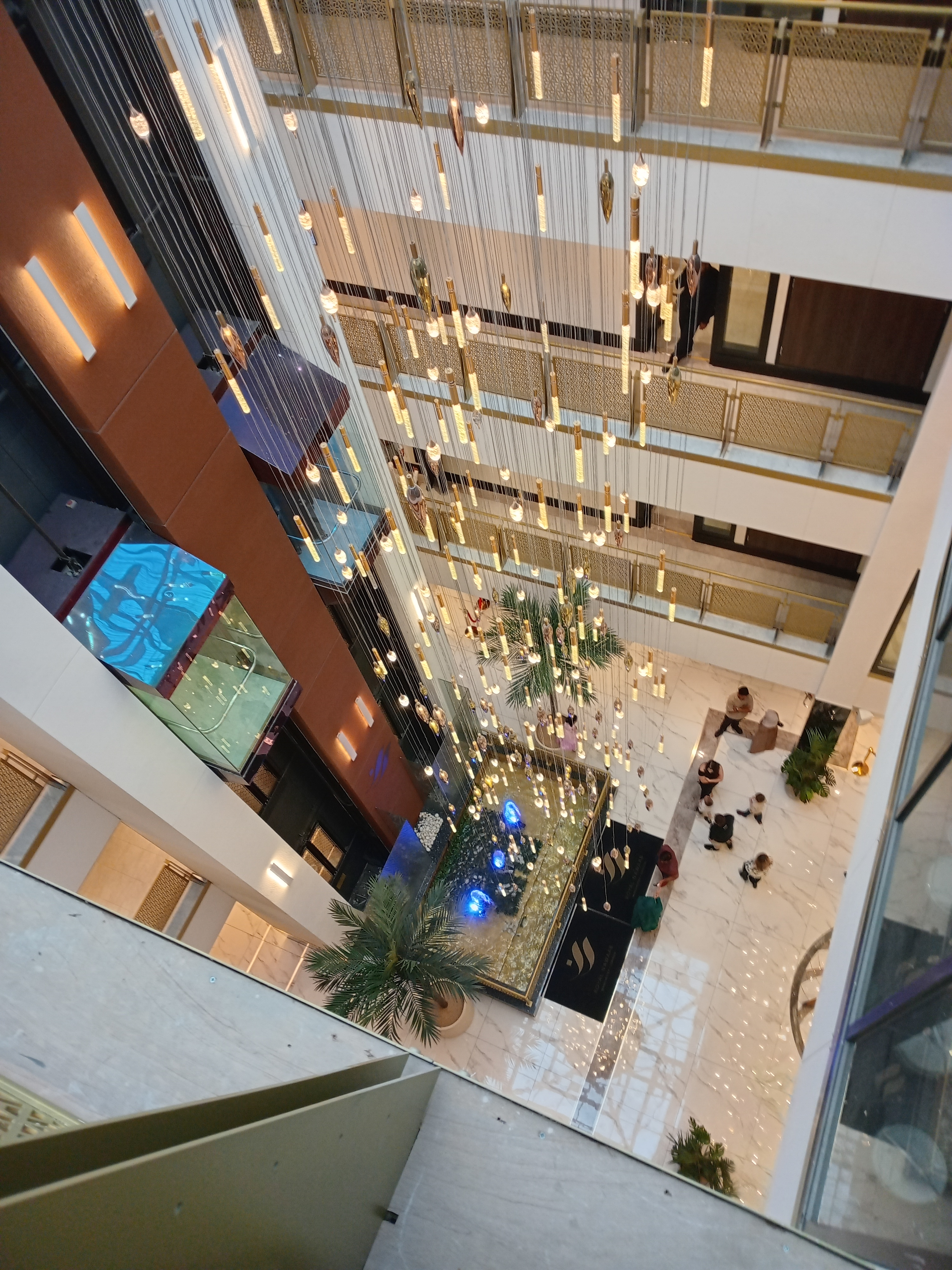
Royal Nawaab from floor 4

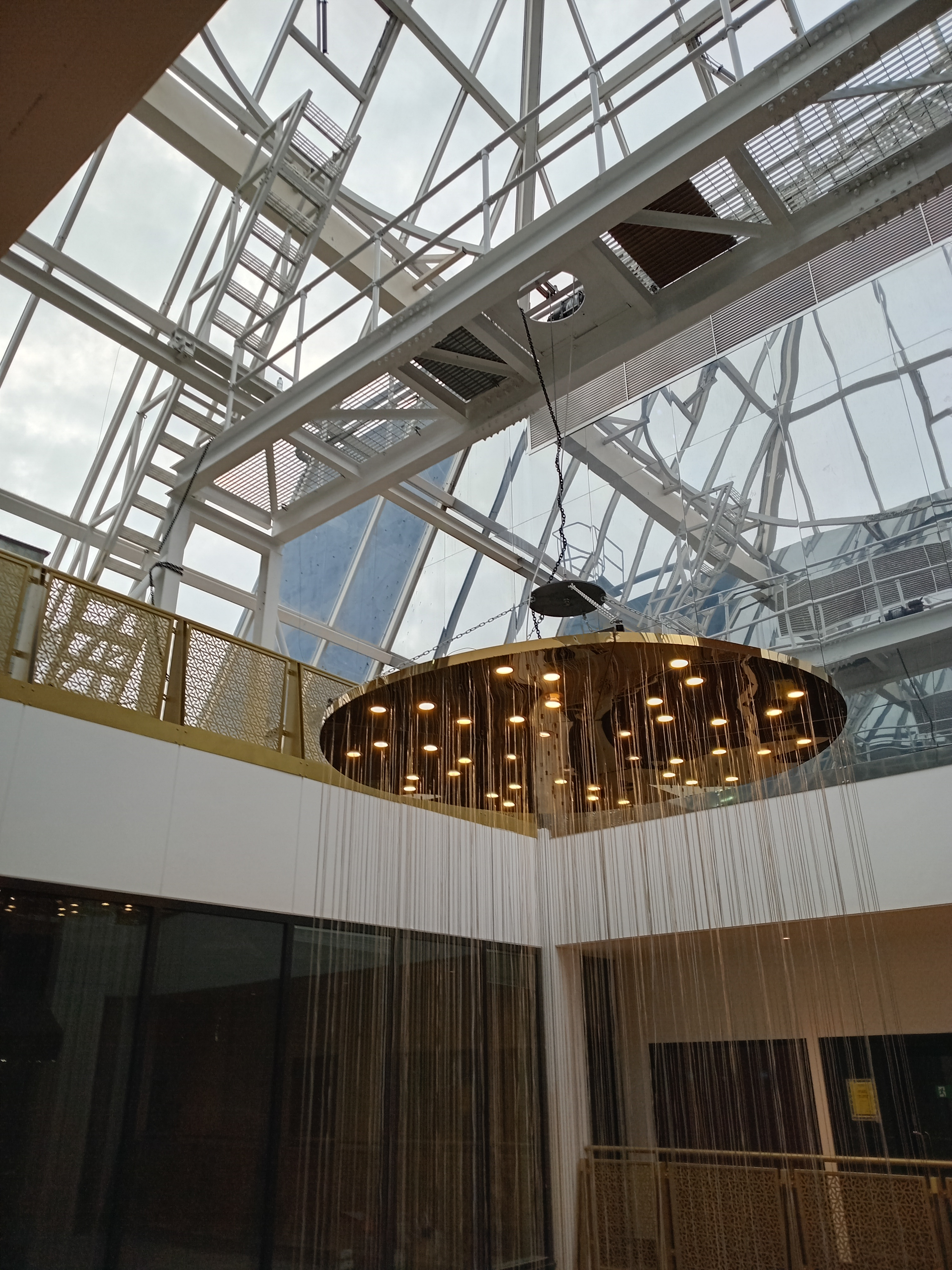
Royal Nawaab roof from inside

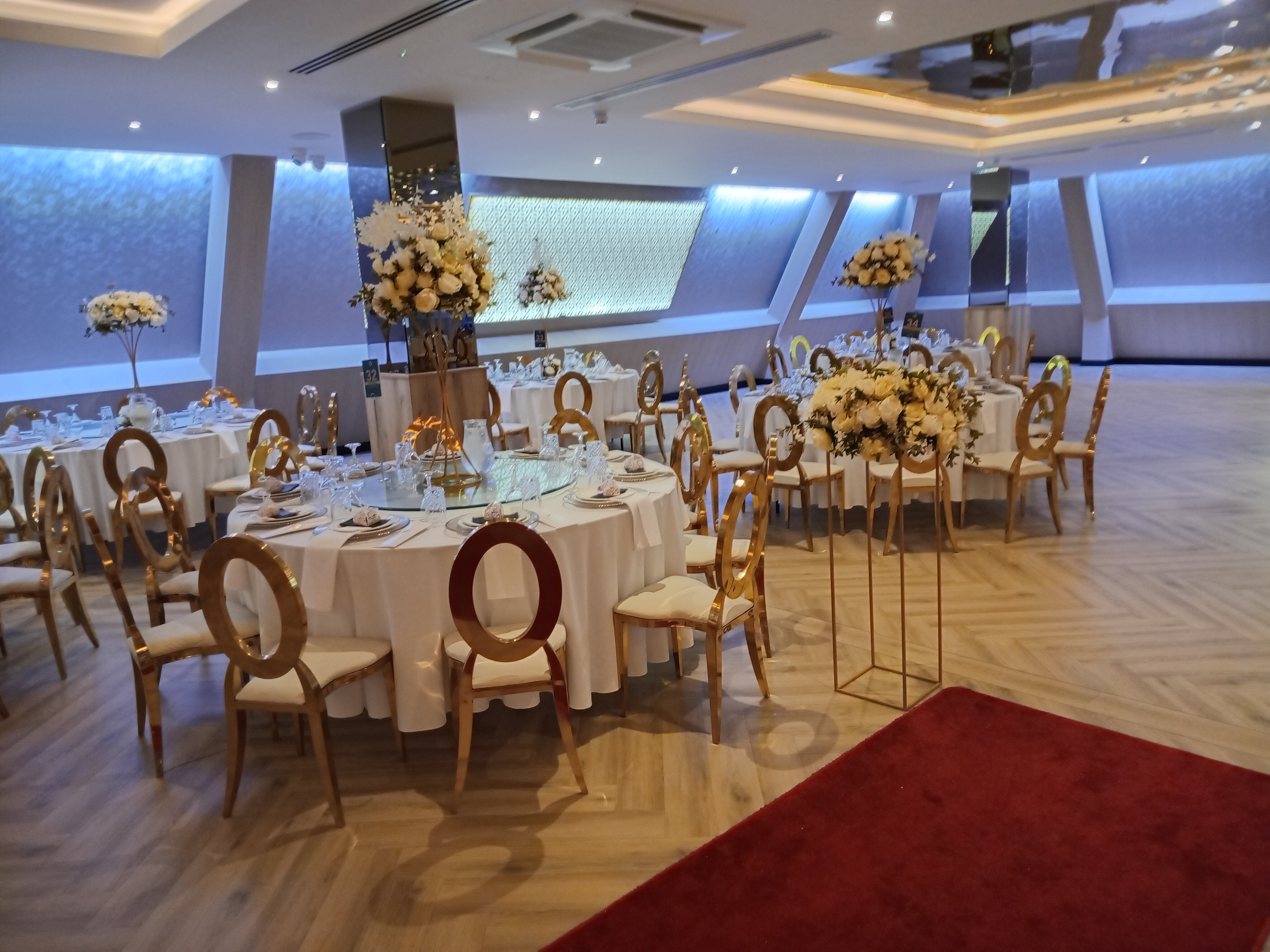
Tables set for a wedding
