= Stockport War Memorial Art Gallery =

Listed building in Greater Manchester, England

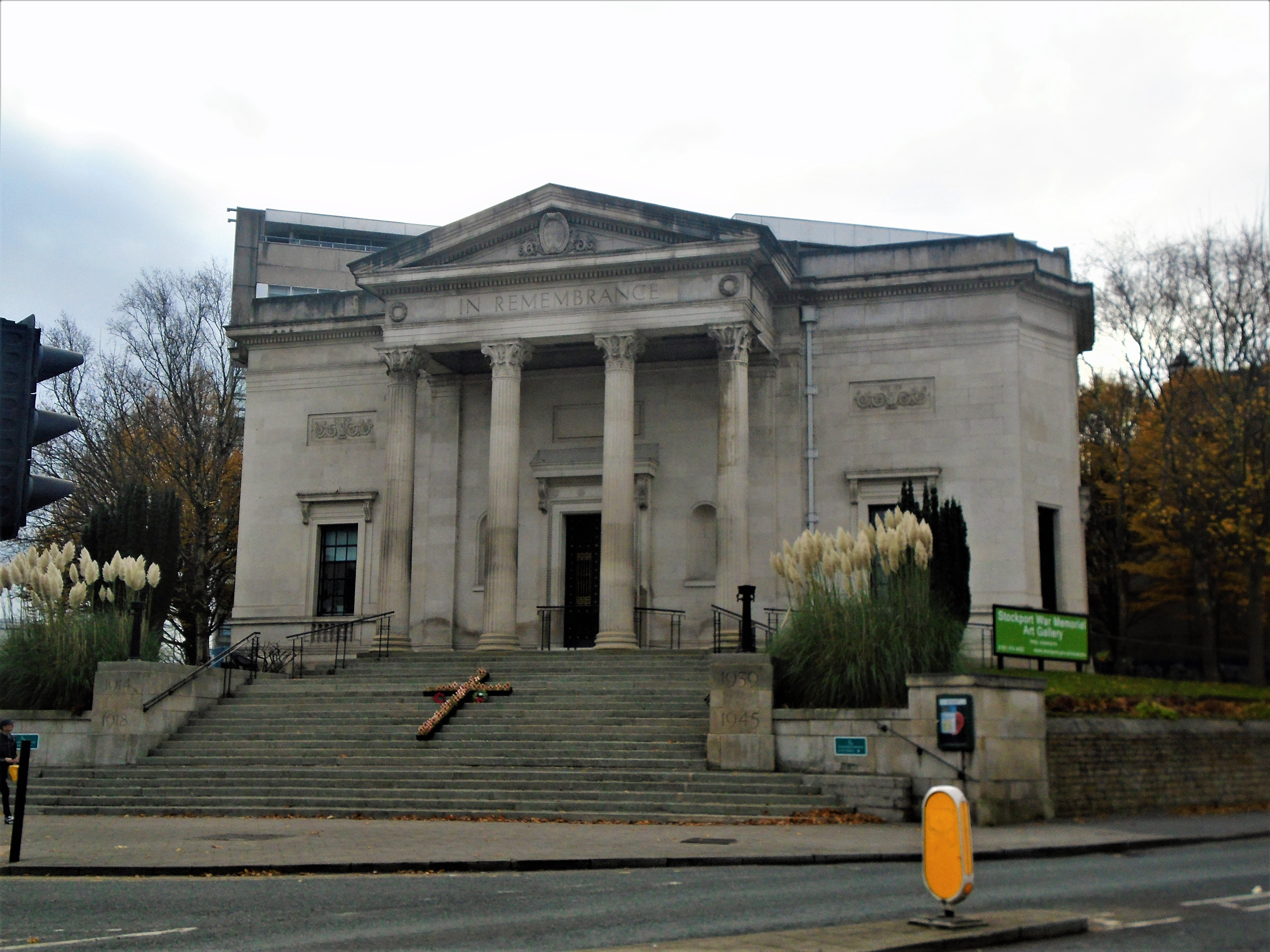
- The building in 2021

General information
- Architectural style: Neoclassical Greek Revival
- Location: Wellington Road South, Stockport, Greater Manchester, England
- Coordinates: 53.40488°N 2.15871°W
- Year built: 1925; 101 years ago
- Cost: £24,000
- Owner: Stockport Metropolitan Borough Council (SMBC)

Technical details
- Material: Portland stone, brick, slate

Design and construction
- Architect: James Theodore Halliday
- Architecture firm: Halliday, Paterson & Agate

Website
- Official website

Listed Building – Grade II*
- Official name: War Memorial Art Gallery
- Designated: 11 July 2007
- Reference no.: 1392091

Stockport War Memorial Art Gallery is a Grade II* listed building on the corner of Wellington Road South and Greek Street in Stockport, Greater Manchester, England. Built in 1925 as the town's principal memorial to those who died in the First World War, it was designed by James Theodore Halliday in a Neoclassical Greek Revival style and constructed in Portland stone. The building combines a memorial hall with exhibition galleries, reflecting a post‑war decision to unite commemoration with public art. Funded entirely by voluntary subscriptions, it was opened by Prince Henry on 15 October 1925 and continues to house both war memorials and art displays.

== History ==
Plans for an art gallery were being discussed in 1912, but after the First World War it was decided in 1919 that Stockport's memorial should combine a commemorative sculpture, a memorial hall and an exhibition space. The site was provided by the trustees of the late Samuel Kay J.P.

The building was designed by James Theodore Halliday of Halliday, Paterson & Agate in a Neoclassical Greek Revival style. Early estimates placed the cost at about £30,000, later reduced to £22,000 in 1923, with the final figure reaching £24,000 (equivalent to £1,250,000 in 2025). Of this, £2,100 was allocated for the sculpture. All funds were raised through voluntary subscriptions.

In 1921 Halliday put forward several sculptors for consideration: Gilbert Ledward, William Dick Reid, Frederick J. Wilcoxson, Jack Millard and John Cassidy. With advice from the war artist Francis Dodd, the committee selected Ledward's design.

The foundation stone for the building was laid on 15 September 1923, in a ceremony attended by Mayor Alderman Charles Royle. Prince Henry inaugurated the Stockport War Memorial on 15 October 1925, as a tribute to those who died during the First World War.

On 11 July 2007, Stockport War Memorial Art Gallery was designated a Grade II* listed building. The gallery spaces host year-round exhibitions featuring both national and international artists, including Helen Clapcott. The gallery also offers a programme that provides emerging artists with opportunities to showcase their work and hosts various events and workshops.

== Architecture ==
The building stands on a corner site, raised about 4.5 metres (15 ft) above the road and reached by a broad staircase of twenty‑three steps. Low Portland stone walls run alongside, each carrying cast‑iron lamps and dates referring to the two world wars.

Its design follows a Greek Revival approach, with a central porch supported by four Corinthian columns, loosely modelled on the Temple of Apollo at Bassae. A deep band across the front carries the words "IN REMEMBRANCE" with laurel wreaths on either side, and the triangular top contains the Stockport borough arms.

The main doorway has a projecting top carried on scroll‑shaped brackets, with decorative roundels set into the band above. The double timber doors include brass roundels and small glazed panels, and are screened by brass railings with a Greek‑key pattern. A niche sits on each side of the entrance.

Ground‑floor windows flank the doorway, each with a projecting top and scroll brackets, set above a small balustrade. Above them are rectangular decorative panels with scrolling ornament.

Behind the front range, the plan forms a modified T‑shape with two side galleries, a picture gallery on the first floor, and a full‑height memorial hall at the rear. This hall is topped by a dome and ends in an apsidal wall.

=== Interior ===
The entrance opens into a marble‑paved hall with a clear view through to the memorial hall at the rear and to galleries on either side, each set behind a pair of fluted marble columns in the Doric style. The ceilings have plaster decoration with a Greek‑key motif.

A foyer spans the centre of the building, containing an open‑well staircase with a quarter landing lit by a tall, round‑headed window on the west side. The stair has a brass handrail and iron balusters with a wave‑scroll pattern. From the foyer there is access to a late‑20th‑century extension on the east side.

The memorial hall is reached through a screen formed by two Cipollino marble columns with bronze capitals inspired by the Tower of the Winds in Athens. The hall is lit from above and has a sail‑vaulted ceiling with a shallow dome. Its walls are lined with Mazzano marble and feature white marble plaques recording the names of 2,200 First World War casualties. Additional plaques have been added to commemorate those who died during the Second World War and later conflicts, including the Korean War, Falklands War, and The Troubles. Green Tinos marble forms the skirting and frieze, and the floor is paved in marble. Bronze pedestal lamps stand in each corner.

A large white-marble sculpture by Gilbert Ledward, Britannia and Soldier, stands in the apse. It shows a life‑size Britannia draped with a flag, holding a sword of honour and a wreath, with a young man kneeling at her feet on a shield that crushes a serpent.

On the first‑floor landing, the memorial hall can be seen through an open lunette with a low iron balustrade decorated with brass antefixes in an anthemion pattern. The landing has a deep plaster frieze of anthemion motifs and a small glazed dome A picture gallery runs across the full width of the front of the first floor, originally lit from above, with paired columns at each end and an ornate door surround with acroteria and roundels. The doors are timber, with fielded panels.

== Gallery ==
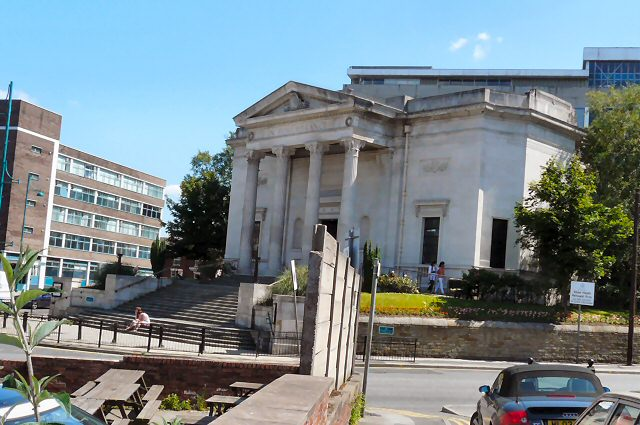
The building viewed from Frances Street, 2009

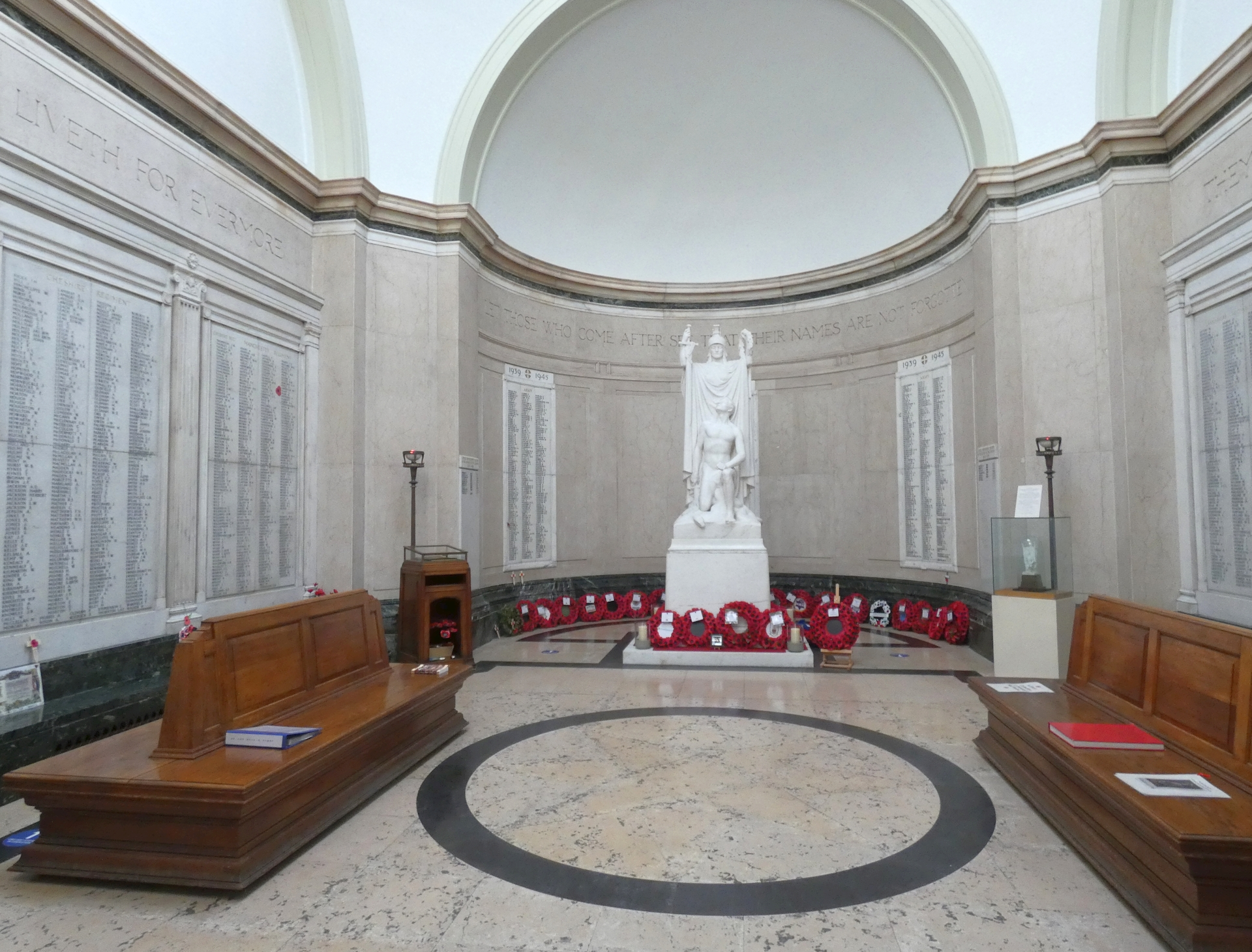
Memorial hall, 2023

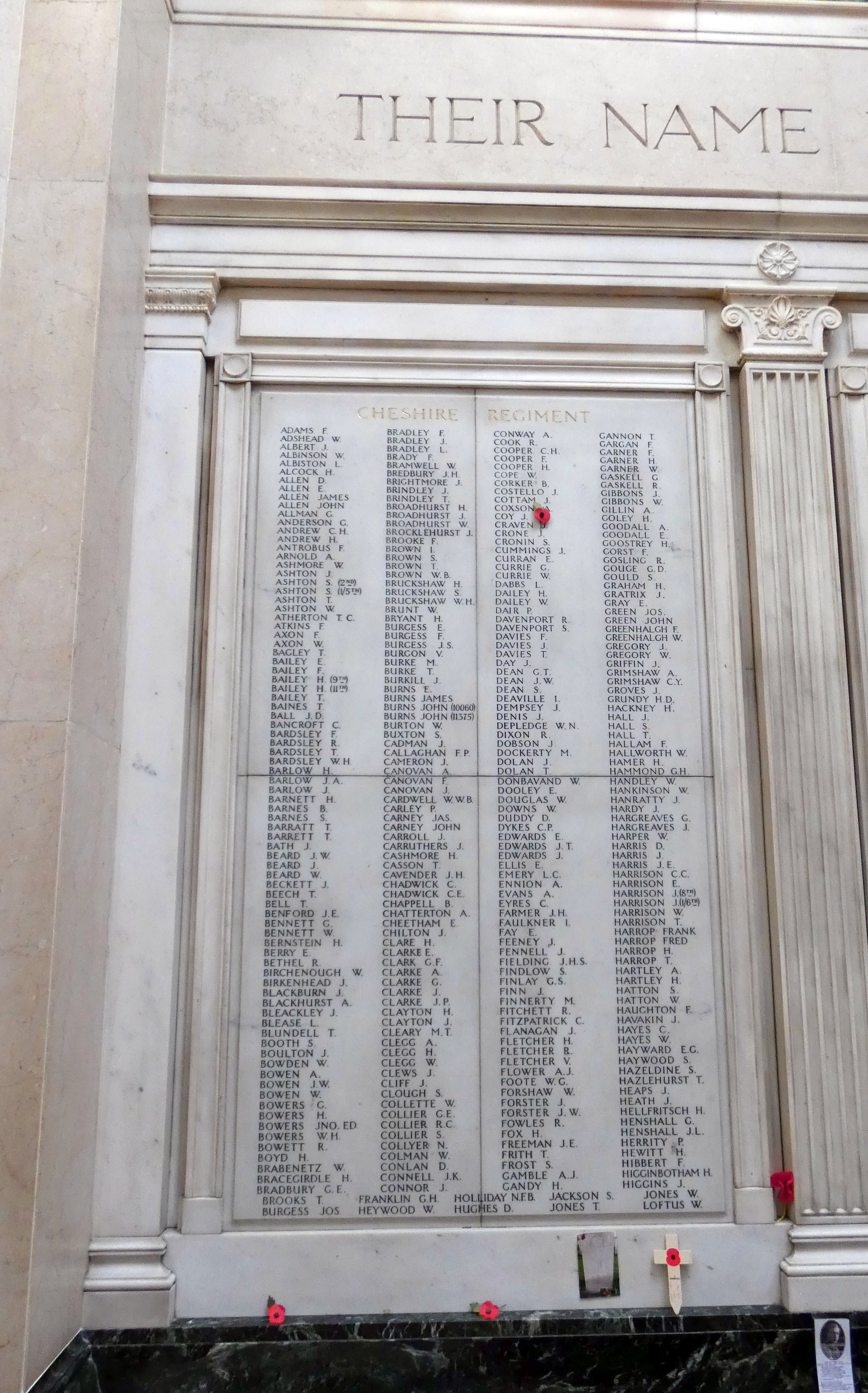
Names of Cheshire Regiment servicemen, 2023

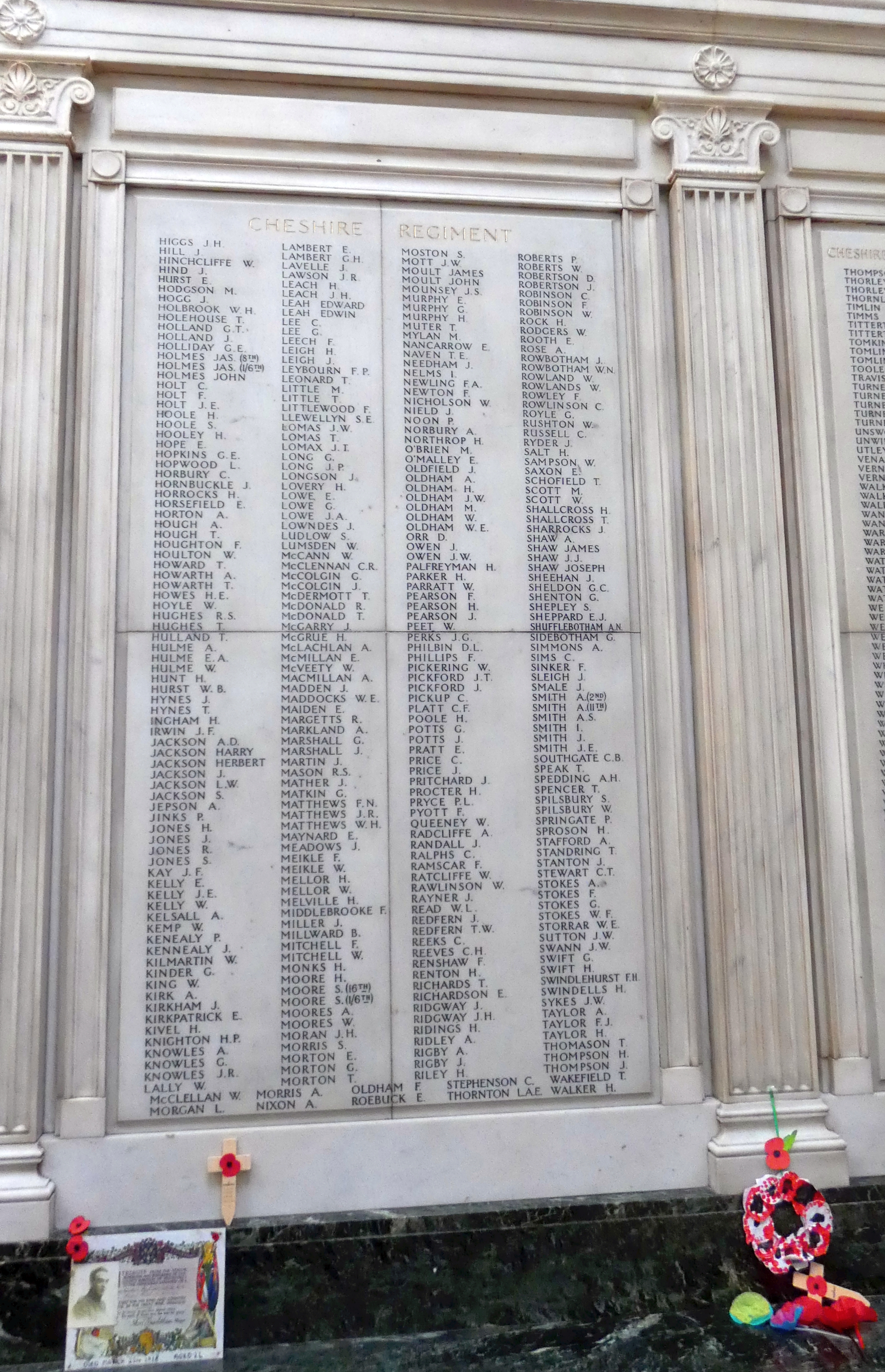
Names of Cheshire Regiment servicemen, 2023

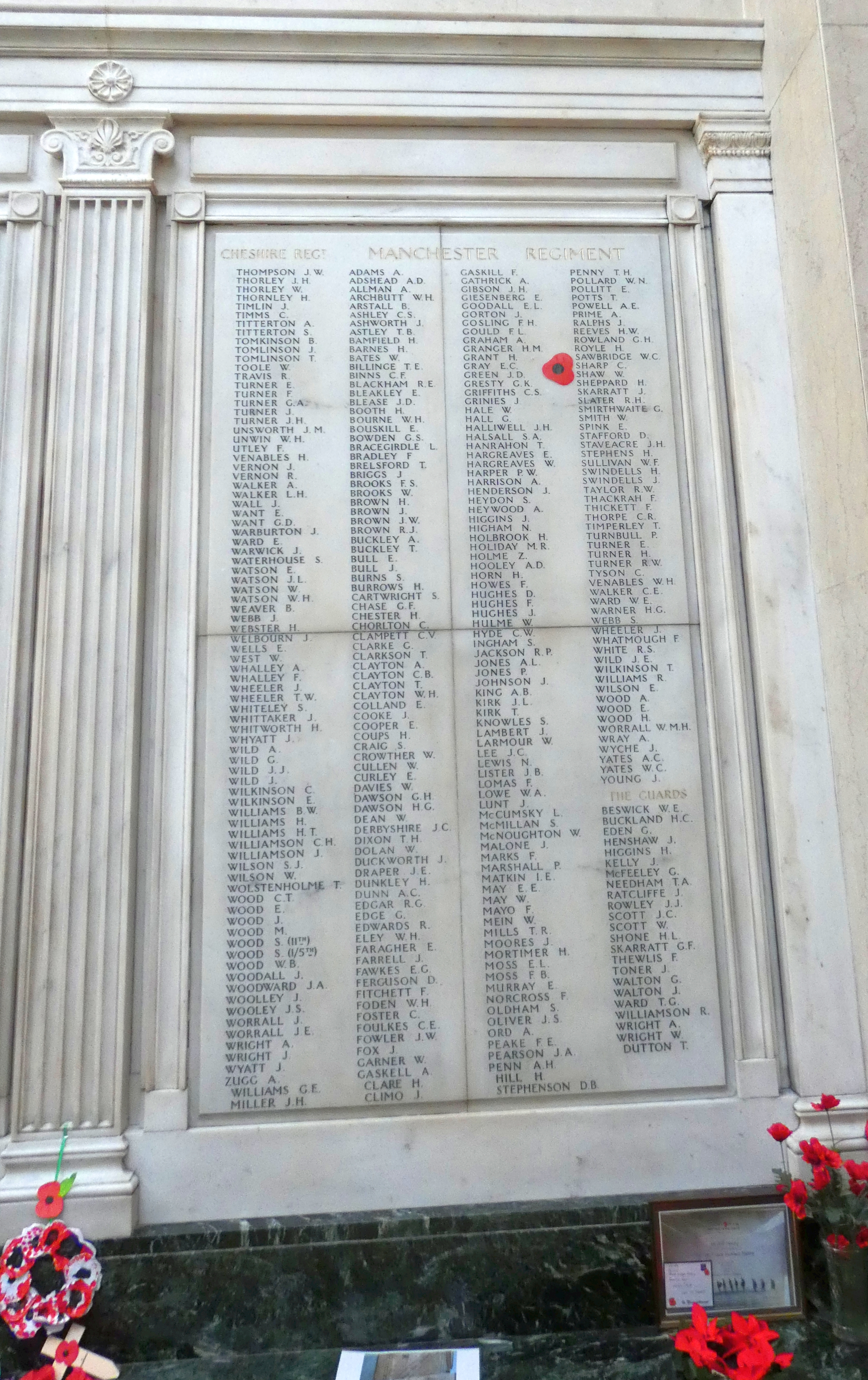
Names of Cheshire Regiment and Manchester Regiment servicemen, 2023

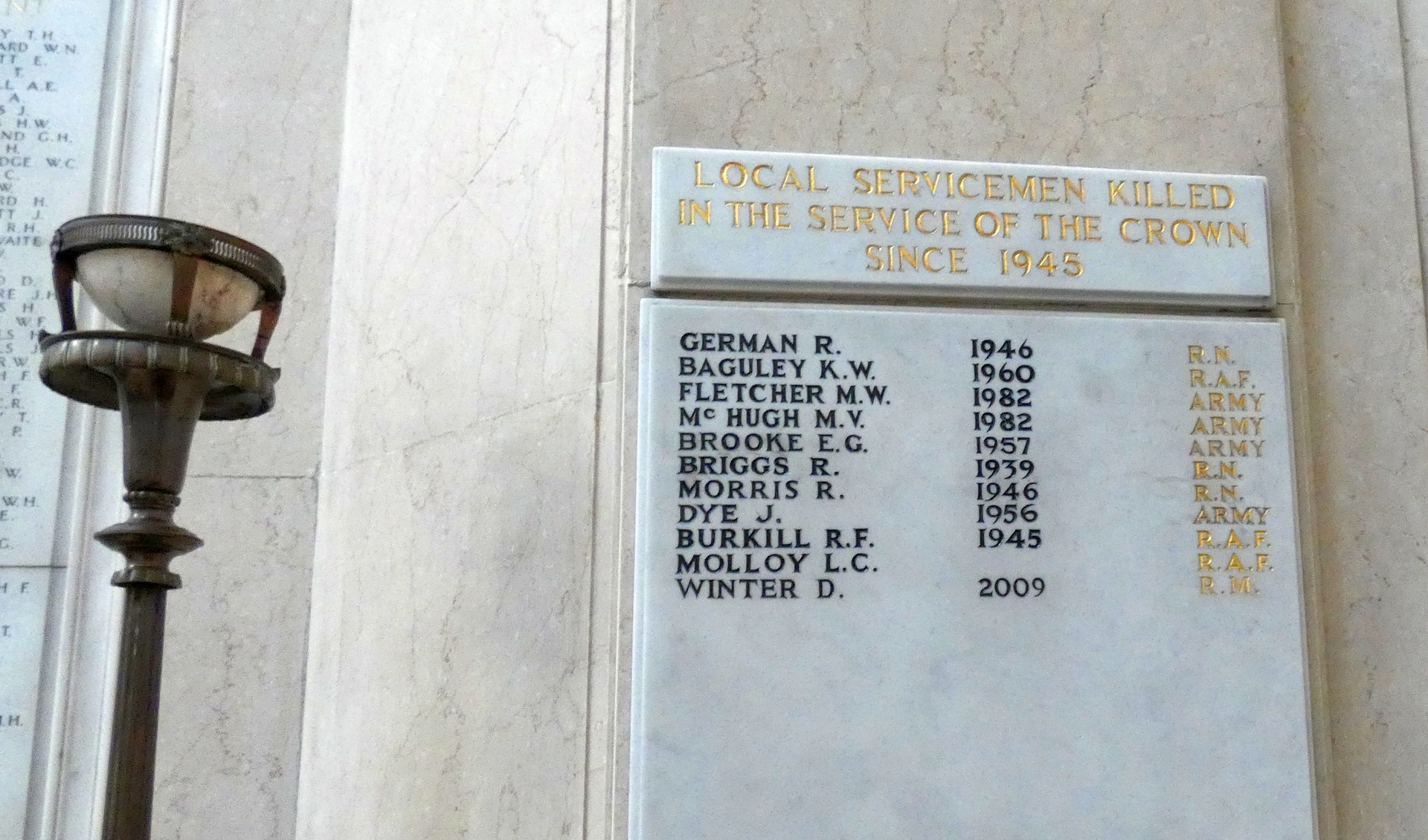
Names of local servicemen killed since 1945 in 2023

== See also ==
- Grade II* listed buildings in Greater Manchester
- Listed buildings in Stockport
