= Adswood =

Suburb of Stockport, Greater Manchester, England

Coordinates: 53.391°N 2.175°W

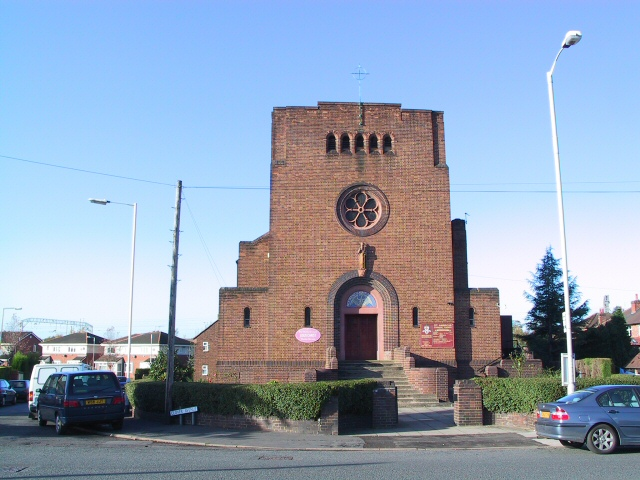
- St Ambrose's Roman Catholic Church

- Location within Greater Manchester
- OS grid reference: SJ883882
- Metropolitan borough: Stockport
- Metropolitan county: Greater Manchester
- Region: North West
- Country: England
- Sovereign state: United Kingdom
- Post town: STOCKPORT
- Postcode district: SK3
- Dialling code: 0161
- Police: Greater Manchester
- Fire: Greater Manchester
- Ambulance: North West
- UK Parliament: Stockport

Adswood is a suburb of Stockport, Greater Manchester, England.

== History ==
=== Adswood Hall ===
Built in the seventeenth century, the hall was originally inhabited by the Hirst family. By the nineteenth century, the site was a farm, and in the early twentieth century the building was sold off along with other local farmland in the course of housing developments on the site.

=== WW2 bombing ===
On Christmas Eve morning 1944, a German V1 bomb landed in a resident’s garden in Garners Lane, Adswood. There was one fatality and some injuries. The impact destroyed and damaged a number of houses.

=== Brickworks ===
Adswood was home to a number of brickworks sites belonging to the company J.&A. Jacksons, inc. 1922. The company was an important supplier for the local Manchester area, mainly in its provision of common bricks used for internal wall eaves.

== Housing ==
Council housing in Adswood began in the 1920s with the building of Culver Road at the back of the estate towards neighbouring Cale Green. The rest of the housing was built in the 1930s and 1940s. In 2016 building started again in the north east corner.

A significant portion of Stockport borough’s council housing is still based in Adswood and the Bridgehall estate. The borough council’s Strategic Housing Land Availability Assessment in 2020 specified a number of locations in the Adswood area where planning permission has been sought for the development of additional housing.

== Parks ==
The area is home to Adswood Park, Siddington Avenue Park and Prior Park. Adswood Park opened to the public in June 1913 as Adswood Recreation Ground. It currently has a play area, football pitch, open space and car parking area.

== Community centres ==
Local community facilities include the local Pantry which is run by the council’s housing management company, and Adswood and Bridgehall Library.

Chelwood Foodbank Plus has operated a local foodbank for the area since 2013.

== Education ==
The local primary schools are Adswood Primary School, Bridgehall Primary School and St Ambrose RC Primary School.

Adswood Primary school opened permanently in 1936 as Adswood Council School - shifting from a temporary home in a wood hut on nearby Neston Grove.

== Parliamentary representation ==
Adswood is in the Davenport and Cale Green electoral ward. It is currently represented by the Labour councillors Cllr Dickie Davies, Cllr Wendy Wild and Cllr Elise Wilson.

== Religion ==
The local churches are Chelford Baptist, St Ambrose Catholic, 360Life, Saint Gabriel and Saint John's Methodist.

== Notable people ==
- Angela Rayner, Labour MP
- Charlie Mitten, former footballer
- Paul Warhust, former footballer
