= King's Arms, Stockport =

Listed former pub in Greater Manchester, England

King's Arms
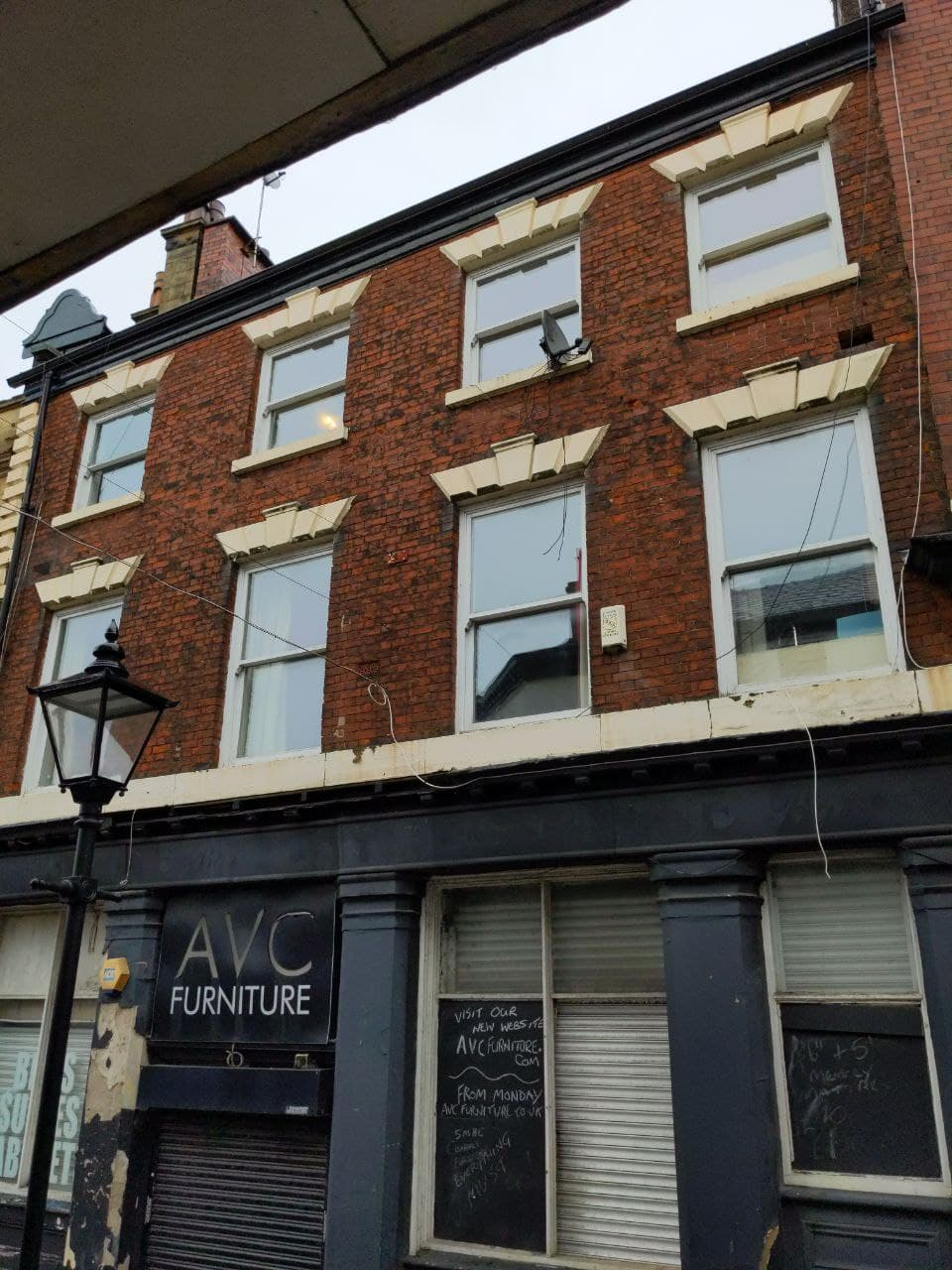
- The former pub in 2021

- Location within Greater Manchester
- Former names: The Hole in the Wall

General information
- Status: Vacant
- Type: Public house (former)
- Location: Bridge Street Brow, Stockport, Greater Manchester, England
- Coordinates: 53.4119°N 2.1575°W
- Year built: Early to mid-19th century
- Renovated: Late 19th century (extended)

Design and construction
- Designations

Listed Building – Grade II
- Official name: Former King's Arms public house
- Designated: 10 March 1975
- Reference no.: 1067193

The King's Arms is a Grade II listed former public house on Bridge Street Brow in Stockport, Greater Manchester, England. Built in the early to mid-19th century, it is thought to have replaced an earlier inn called The Greyhound. It was known locally as The Hole in the Wall in the 1840s. After later use as a wine bar and a furniture shop, the building is unoccupied as of November 2026.

== History ==
The building was constructed in the early to mid-19th century, according to its official listing. (Note: The Campaign for Real Ale (CAMRA) gives a construction date of 1824.) It is thought to have replaced an earlier inn called The Greyhound, which was in use in the early 19th century. By the 1840s it was known locally as The Hole in the Wall and was run by the Baker family, who later operated the Bakers Vaults and owned several properties on the left side of the Brow leading up towards Market Place. The 1898 Ordnance Survey map shows the building as an inn without a name, while the 1922 and 1936 editions record it as a public house.

On 10 March 1975, the King's Arms was designated a Grade II listed building. It forms a group with the Grade II-listed 1 Great Underbank and 26 and 28 Bridge Street Brow. Subsequent alterations saw the building used first as a wine bar and later as a furniture shop, although the dates of these changes are not recorded. As of November 2026 it is unoccupied.

== Architecture ==
=== Exterior ===
The building is constructed in brick in Flemish bond and has three storeys. The upper windows have shaped lintels with keystones, and there are four on each of the top two levels, though those on the right are filled in. The corners on the left side are emphasised with dressed stone, and a shaped timber band runs below the roof. The ground floor has a shop front with simple vertical supports and a fascia with a dentil cornice. On the right is a later 19th‑century addition in a matching style, possibly created by updating an older structure.

=== Interior ===
The interior keeps the main parts of its original layout, especially on the upper floor, where it links through to a neighbouring building facing Market Place. This area includes a mid‑19th‑century warehouse space with timber‑framed floors and openings that were once used for lifting goods from the Market Place side.

== See also ==
- Listed buildings in Stockport
- Listed pubs in Greater Manchester
