= Houldsworth Working Men's Club =

Club in Reddish, Greater Manchester, England

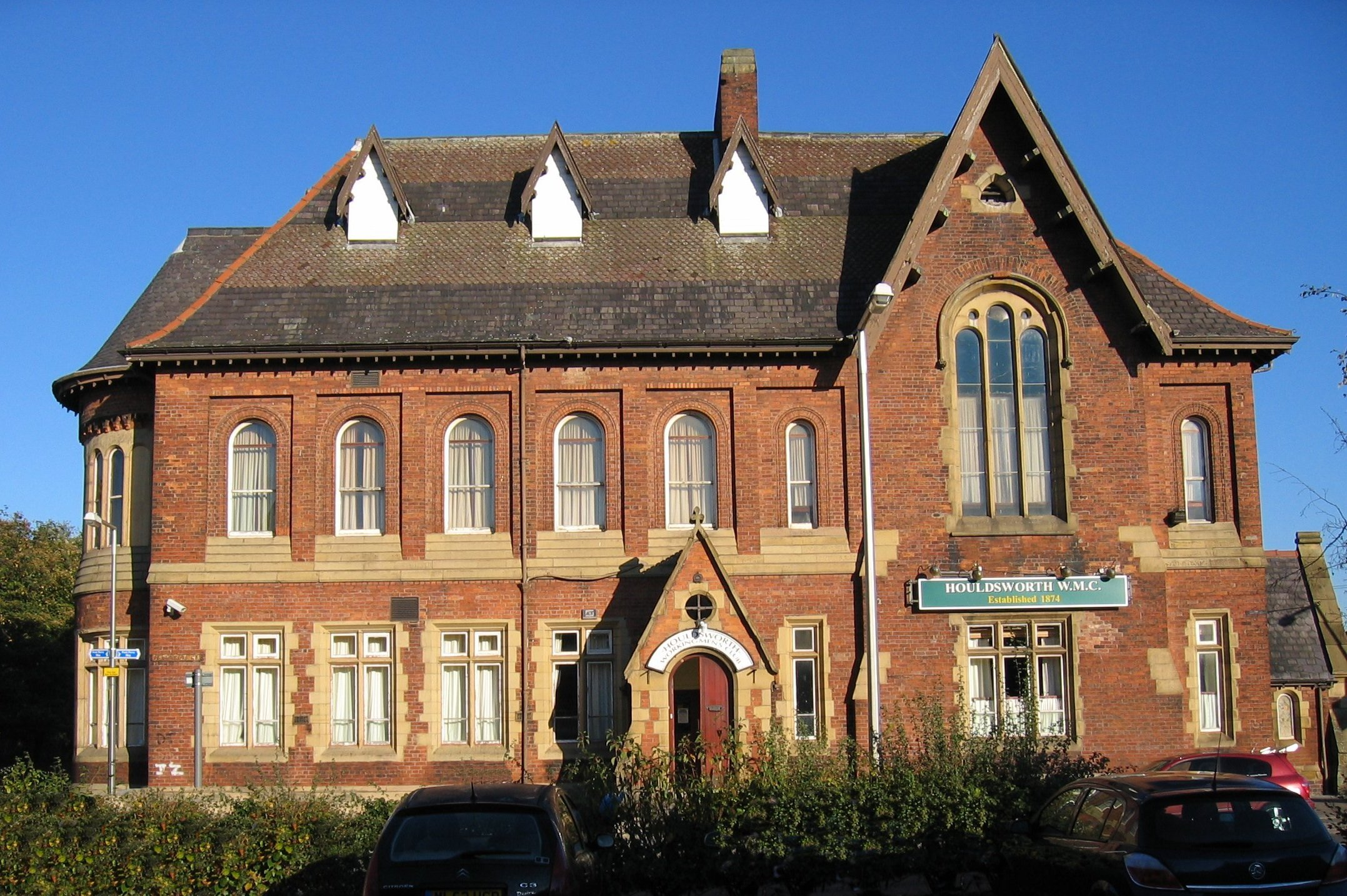
- The main entrance from Leamington Road

- Location within Greater Manchester
- Alternative names: Big Club

General information
- Architectural style: Gothic Revival
- Location: Leamington Road, Reddish, Greater Manchester, England
- Coordinates: 53.4383°N 2.1573°W
- Year built: 1874
- Client: William Houldsworth

Design and construction
- Architect: Abraham Henthorn Stott
- Designations

Listed Building – Grade II*
- Official name: Houldsworth Working Mens Club
- Designated: 30 October 1973
- Reference no.: 1067173

Website
- houldsworthwmc.co.uk

Houldsworth Working Men's Club is a Grade II* listed club on Leamington Road in Reddish, an area of the Metropolitan Borough of Stockport within Greater Manchester, England. Designed in a Gothic style by Abraham Henthorn Stott for the mill-owner William Houldsworth and completed in 1874, it remains in use as a working men's club. Stott had earlier designed Houldsworth Mill for him in 1865, and is also believed to have designed the model estate of terraced workers' housing beside the mill. The club is locally known as the Big Club, and in summer the green to the rear is used for crown green bowls.

== History ==
The building was designed and constructed in 1874 by Abraham Henthorn Stott of Oldham for the industrialist William Houldsworth. (Note: The Manchester Group of The Victorian Society gives a date of 1872.) Stott, who had previously designed Houldsworth Mill for him in 1865, is also believed to have designed the model estate of terraced houses built beside the mill for its workforce.

On 30 October 1973, Houldsworth Working Men's Club was designated a Grade II* listed building. The building forms a group with the adjacent St Elisabeth's Church, which is Grade I listed, and with the Grade II* listed rectory, Houldsworth School, and associated walls, all designed by Alfred Waterhouse for Houldsworth.

The club is locally known as the Big Club, although the period when this name came into use has not been published. During the summer months, crown green bowls takes place on the bowling green behind the club.

== Architecture ==
The building is constructed of red brick with stone detailing, and the roofs are finished in broad alternating bands of slate and red tiles. It has two storeys and an attic and is arranged in a U‑shaped plan with two rear wings, the eastern one being the wider. Modern additions stand to the back.

The exterior is irregular and treated in a Gothic manner. The main front, which faces south, has eight bays and a steep roof with three dormer windows and a gable over the broader seventh bay. The first floor has round‑arched openings, while the ground floor has windows divided by mullions and transoms. A small porch with a pitched roof stands in the fifth bay, and at the right end a gabled section contains a large pointed window with tracery above a wider mullioned and transomed window. On the west side, the elevation includes a two‑storey bay window topped with a conical roof at the southern end.

== See also ==
- Grade II* listed buildings in Greater Manchester
- Listed buildings in Stockport
