= Houldsworth School =

Listed building in Greater Manchester, England

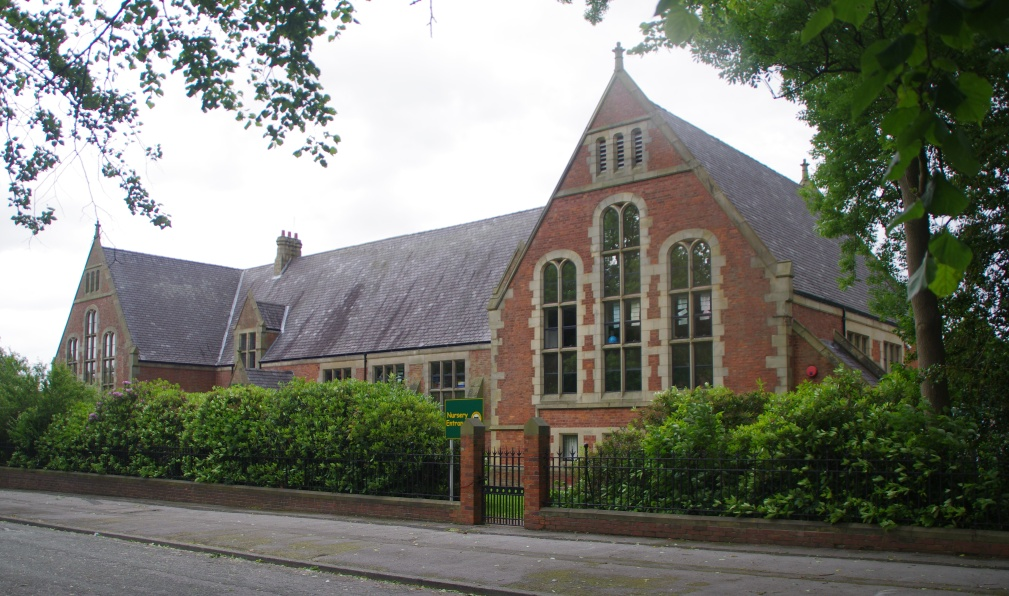
- The school building in 2012

- Location within Greater Manchester
- Alternative names: St Elisabeth's Primary School

General information
- Architectural style: Gothic Revival
- Location: Bedford Street, Reddish, Greater Manchester, England
- Coordinates: 53.43895°N 2.16338°W
- Year built: 1874; 152 years ago
- Renovated: 2021 (refurbished)

Design and construction
- Architect: Alfred Waterhouse

Website
- thrive-ste.com

Listed Building – Grade II*
- Official name: Houldsworth School
- Designated: 30 October 1973
- Reference no.: 1067180

Listed Building – Grade II*
- Official name: Wall to west of Houldsworth School
- Designated: 10 March 1975
- Reference no.: 1162583

Houldsworth School (now St Elisabeth's Primary School) is a building on Bedford Street in Reddish, an area within the Metropolitan Borough of Stockport, Greater Manchester, England. It is designated as a Grade II* listed building. The school was designed by the Victorian architect Alfred Waterhouse and completed in 1874. It is a representative example of 19th‑century educational architecture in the region.

== History ==
Houldsworth School was commissioned during the late Victorian era to serve the growing population of Reddish, which expanded rapidly due to industrialisation. The building was designed by Alfred Waterhouse, whose other works include the Natural History Museum in London and Manchester Town Hall. The school was named after Sir William Houldsworth, a local industrialist and philanthropist associated with the nearby Houldsworth Mill. The school opened in 1874 and has operated as an educational institution for the area since that time.

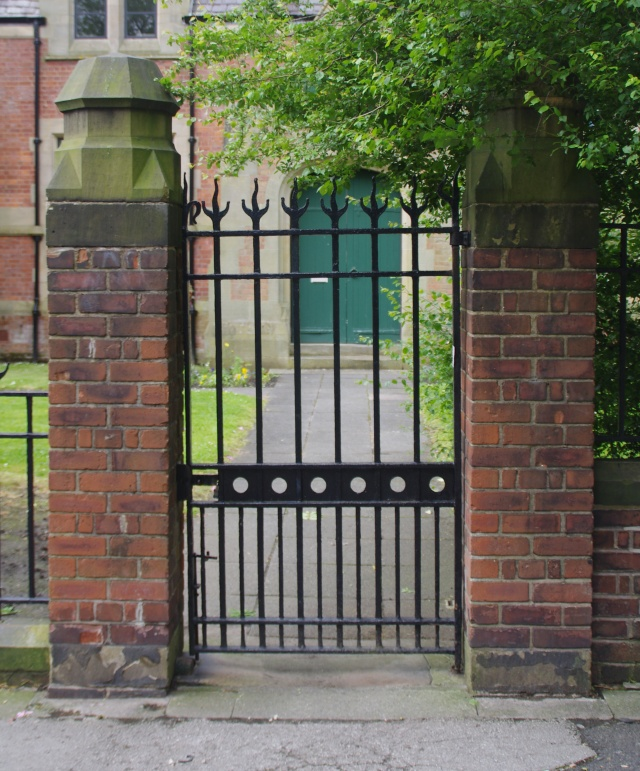
Grade II* listed wall to west of Houldsworth School in 2012

On 30 October 1973, Houldsworth School was designated a Grade II* listed building. A wall to the west of the school is also Grade II* listed.

The present St Elisabeth's Primary School opened in November 2019 as a new provision and is now part of the Thrive Church of England Academy Trust. It occupies a site historically associated with the original Victorian school buildings. While the original school building is listed, the modern primary school operates within updated facilities designed to meet contemporary educational requirements.

In 2021 listed building consent was granted for refurbishment works, including repairs to flat roofs and stone window surrounds, to support the ongoing conservation of the historic structure. The school maintains links with St Elisabeth's Church and the surrounding community as part of its continuing role in the area.

== Architecture ==
Houldsworth School is designed in Waterhouse's characteristic Late Gothic Revival style. The building is single-storey, constructed in red brick with stone dressings and topped with a slate roof. Its principal elevation features two large gables facing the road, each containing a prominent mullioned and transomed window. A porch with a three-centred arch is positioned to the left of centre, while additional mullion-and-transom windows appear to the right. The roofline is punctuated by dormer windows.

== Context and group value ==
The school building forms part of an industrial community and is associated with nearby listed heritage structures, including St Elisabeth's Church, its rectory, and the Houldsworth Working Men's Club on Leamington Road.

== See also ==
- Grade II* listed buildings in Greater Manchester
- List of educational buildings by Alfred Waterhouse
- Listed buildings in Stockport
