= The Crown, Heaton Mersey =

Listed pub in Stockport, Greater Manchester, England

The Crown
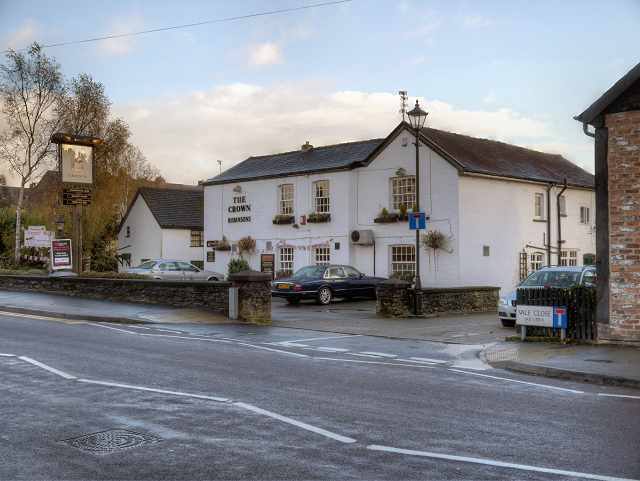
- The pub in 2012

- Location within Greater Manchester
- Alternative names: Crown Inn

General information
- Type: Public house
- Location: 6 Vale Close, Heaton Mersey, Stockport, Greater Manchester, England
- Coordinates: 53.4124°N 2.2032°W
- Year built: Late 18th or early 19th century
- Renovated: 20th century (added)
- Owner: Robinsons

Design and construction
- Designations

Listed Building – Grade II
- Official name: Crown Inn
- Designated: 10 March 1975
- Reference no.: 1162341

Website
- Official website

The Crown is a Grade II listed public house set back from Didsbury Road and accessed from Vale Close in Heaton Mersey, a suburb of Stockport, Greater Manchester, England. Built in the late 18th or early 19th century, it began as three or four cottages later combined to form an inn. Robinsons Brewery acquired the freehold in 1912 and continues to own the building.

== History ==
The building was constructed in the late 18th or early 19th century, according to its official listing. It originated as a small group of three or four cottages that were later combined and used as an inn. The 1910 and 1936 Ordnance Survey maps show the building without a name or designation. In 1912 the public house was acquired by Robinsons Brewery.

On 10 March 1975, the Crown Inn was designated a Grade II listed building. It forms a group with the Grade II-listed 2 and 4 Vale Close.

In October 2024, a blue plaque was installed on the building to commemorate John Illingworth (1786–1853), a Heaton Mersey native who later became a significant figure in Ecuador's military and independence movement.

== Architecture ==
=== Exterior ===
The building is finished in painted brick with a slate roof and has two storeys. Its layout forms an L‑shape and appears to have developed in stages, with later additions from the 20th century. Most of the windows are multi‑paned sliding sashes, including several modern replacements.

Facing Didsbury Road, the left‑hand part has two windows on each floor with painted stone sills and gently arched brick heads. These openings sit slightly to the right of centre. Next to this is a section without windows, which seems to be a later addition, possibly from the early 1800s. The entrance to the pub is on this side, approached from Vale Close. To the right, a gabled wing set back slightly from the frontage has similar windows in its end wall. The side elevation shows signs of partial rebuilding in more uniform brickwork. This side also contains altered window openings and a doorway with a shallow arched head.

The rear gable of this wing is unpainted and built in a mix of brick bonds, with evidence of changes and rebuilding. Further 20th‑century extensions stand behind this range and in the rear corner.

=== Interior ===
Inside, the plan has been opened up, removing much of the earlier room layout. To the left is a large lounge with a small bar counter in one corner, with exposed brickwork and old timber. On the right is the main bar counter, which serves two smaller linked rooms. A ceiling beam in the rear part is roughly worked, while one in the front section is plain and may not be original.

== See also ==
- Listed buildings in Stockport
- Listed pubs in Greater Manchester
