= The Alexandra, Edgeley =

Listed pub in Stockport, Greater Manchester, England

The Alexandra
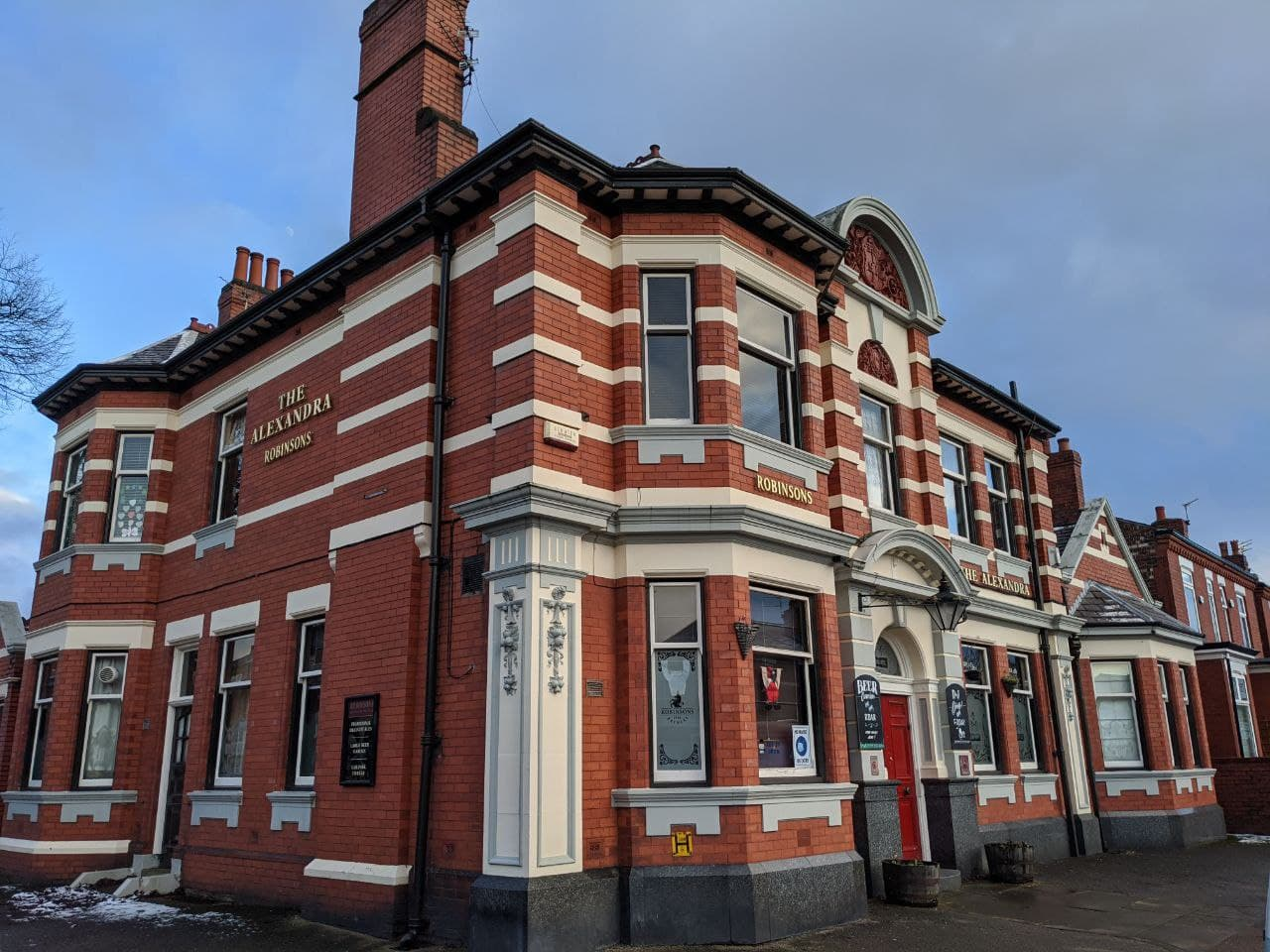
- The pub in 2021

- Location within Greater Manchester
- Alternative names: Alexandra Hotel

General information
- Type: Public house
- Location: 195 Northgate Road, Edgeley, Stockport, Greater Manchester, England
- Coordinates: 53.4020°N 2.1755°W
- Year built: 1911; 115 years ago
- Owner: Robinsons

Design and construction
- Designations

Listed Building – Grade II
- Official name: Alexandra Hotel
- Designated: 9 November 1994
- Reference no.: 1084337

Website
- Official website

The Alexandra is a Grade II listed public house on Northgate Road in Edgeley, a suburb of Stockport, Greater Manchester, England. Built in 1911, it has been part of the Robinsons Brewery estate since 1949. The Campaign for Real Ale (CAMRA) regards its interior as being of "outstanding national historic importance", rating it three stars on its National Inventory of Historic Pub Interiors.

== History ==
The building was constructed in 1911, according to its official listing. The 1922 and 1936 Ordnance Survey maps mark the building as a public house without attributing a name. In June 1949, it became part of the Robinsons Brewery estate, following the acquisition of Bell & Co's Hempshaw Brook Brewery. As of May 2026, the freehold was held by Robinsons.

On 9 November 1994, The Alexandra was designated a Grade II listed building. It is regarded by the Campaign for Real Ale (CAMRA) as having an interior of "outstanding national historic importance" and is rated three stars on its National Inventory of Historic Pub Interiors.

== Architecture ==
=== Exterior ===
The building is constructed in red brick with contrasting pale detailing and has a slate roof with brick chimney stacks. Its footprint is a straightforward rectangle set on a corner, with lower extensions to the right side and at the back. The main front has five windows arranged over two floors. On the left is an octagonal bay that rises the full height of the building. The central section projects slightly and contains the main doorway, above which the upper‑floor window is marked by a decorative panel. A small gable above this carries another panel showing the date "AD 1911".

The ground floor is framed by upright features at the corners linked by a horizontal band, while the upper floor is finished with painted stonework. The windows are traditional sashes, with patterned glass at ground level. The single‑storey part on the right includes a bay window with the word "Billiards" in the glass. The left side of the building includes an entrance that once served the outdoor department.

=== Interior ===
The interior retains a rare and largely intact early 20th-century multi-room layout centred on a lobby bar and servery, with separate tap room, smoke room, bar parlour, commercial room and billiard room. A small entrance lobby leads to a central hall with green and cream glazed wall tiles, coloured decorative glass motifs and mosaic flooring. The rooms are entered through painted timber surrounds with curved pediments, and many retain etched glass panels identifying their original functions, including "Tap Room", "Smoke Room" and "Bar Parlour". Many original features survive throughout the building, including fixed seating, decorative screens with coloured and leaded glass, bell pushes, fireplaces, and Art Nouveau-influenced detailing. The servery retains its original curved mahogany bar front, while the billiard room has exposed roof timbers and a coloured-glass skylight. A former off-sales compartment also survives largely intact, retaining its counter and service hatch, although the bar fittings and off-sales area have been altered over time.

== See also ==
- Listed buildings in Stockport
- Listed pubs in Greater Manchester
