= Star and Garter, Stockport =

Listed pub in Greater Manchester, England

Star and Garter
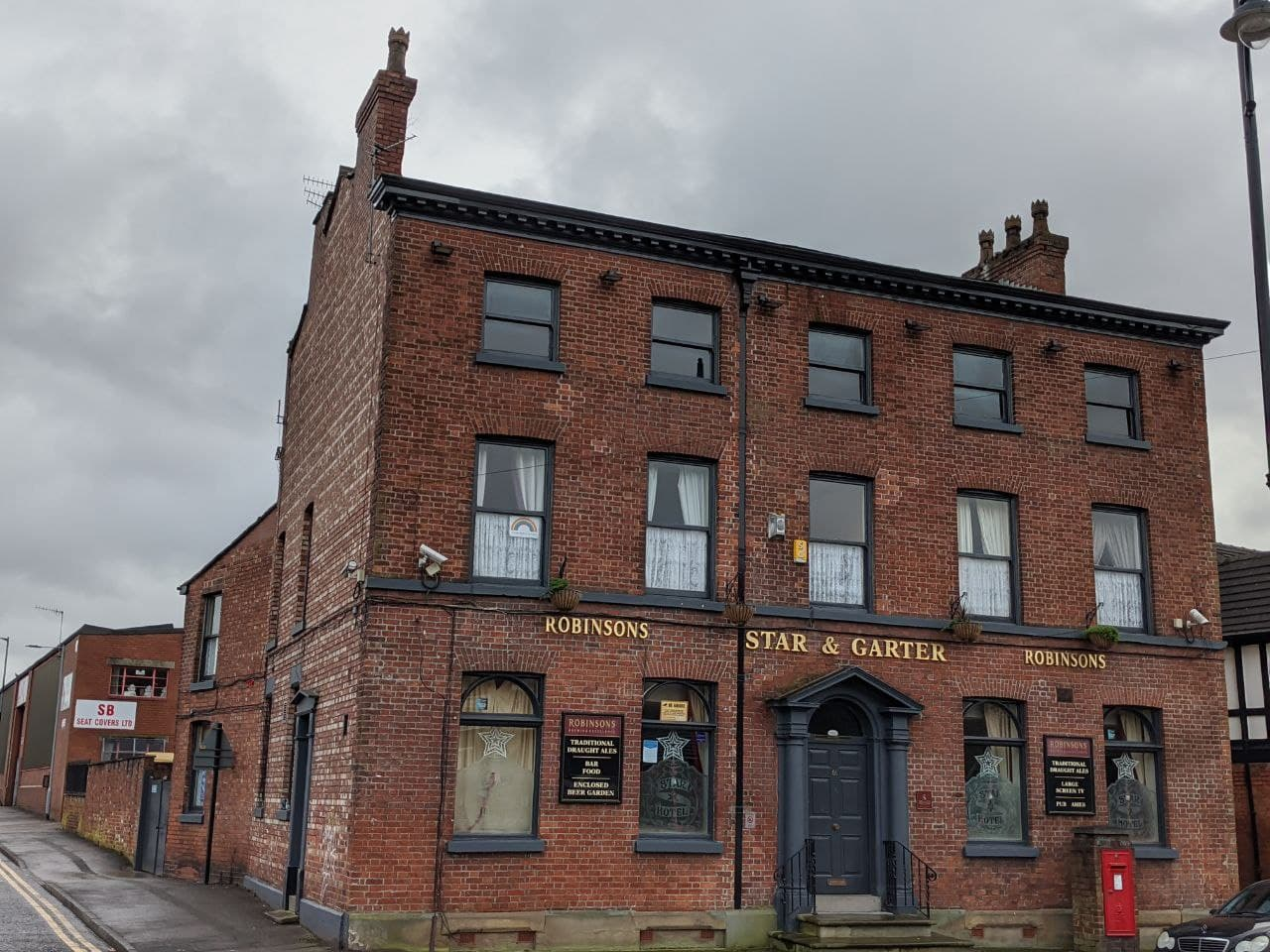
- The pub in 2021

- Location within Greater Manchester

General information
- Type: Public house; originally a hotel
- Location: 61 Higher Hillgate, Stockport, Greater Manchester, England
- Coordinates: 53.4032°N 2.1529°W
- Year built: Early 19th century
- Renovated: Mid-2019 (exterior refurbished)
- Owner: Robinsons

Design and construction
- Designations

Listed Building – Grade II
- Official name: Star and Garter public house
- Designated: 10 March 1975
- Reference no.: 1067210

Website
- Official website

The Star and Garter is a Grade II listed public house on Higher Hillgate in Stockport, Greater Manchester, England. Built in the early 19th century, it was originally a hotel before later becoming a pub. It became part of the Robinsons Brewery estate in 1949 after the acquisition of the Hempshaw Brook Brewery of Bell & Co. Robinsons refurbished the exterior in 2019 and retain the freehold as of 2023.

== History ==
The building was constructed in the early 19th century, according to its official listing. It was originally a hotel, before its conversion into a public house. The 1895 and 1936 Ordnance Survey maps mark the building as a public house without attributing a name.

In 1949 it became part of the Robinsons Brewery estate, following the acquisition of the Hempshaw Brook Brewery of Bell & Co. On 10 March 1975, the Star and Garter was designated a Grade II listed building.

In mid‑2019, Robinsons carried out refurbishment of the pub's exterior, and as of 2023 they continue to own its freehold.

== Architecture ==
The building is constructed in brick in Flemish bond and topped with a slate roof, with chimneys at each end. The front has three floors and five bays, with a central entrance marked by Doric half-columns and an open pediment, and a six‑panel door set beneath a fanlight.

On either side of the entrance are fixed windows added in the late 1800s, each bearing the name "The Star". The upper floors have simple timber-framed windows. A metal drainage pipe runs down the front of the building in a recessed channel, and the guttering sits above a row of small wooden brackets. The right-hand side of the building has similar windows, while the left-hand side was rebuilt in brick in the early 1900s.

Behind the building is a yard enclosed by brick walls, along with a former stable from the late 19th century. This outbuilding has two floors, is built of red brick, and has a chimney at one end.

== See also ==
- Listed buildings in Stockport
- Listed pubs in Greater Manchester
