= Listed buildings in Stockport =

Stockport is a town in the Metropolitan Borough of Stockport, Greater Manchester, England. The town, including the areas of Heaton Chapel, Heaton Mersey, Heaton Moor, Heaton Norris, and Reddish, contains 140 listed buildings that are recorded in the National Heritage List for England. Of these, four are listed at Grade I, the highest of the three grades, 16 are at Grade II*, the middle grade, and the others are at Grade II, the lowest grade.

The town dates back to the medieval era, but relatively few of the listed buildings date from before the coming of the Industrial Revolution towards the end of the 18th century. The town grew rapidly during the 19th century, and the majority of the listed buildings date from this time. The oldest listed buildings are part of the town wall, churches, houses, and farmhouses. From the late 18th century to the end of the 19th century the listed buildings include houses and associated structures, shops, more churches, public houses and hotels, bridges, textile mills now used for other purposes, hospitals, railway viaducts, public buildings, a school, railway buildings, almshouses, and memorials and statues. Dating from the 20th century are banks, another mill, an electrical substation, the town hall, war memorials, a cinema, and telephone kiosks.

== Key ==
Grade	Criteria
I	Buildings of exceptional interest, sometimes considered to be internationally important
II*	Particularly important buildings of more than special interest
II	Buildings of national importance and special interest

== Buildings ==
Name and location	Photograph	Date	Notes	Grade
Portions of town wall 53.41165°N 2.15779°W		Medieval	The most substantial existing portion of the medieval town wall is behind the bank in Great Underbank. It is in red sandstone ashlar, it is supported by a buttress, is about 7 metres (23 ft) long, and a water spout cuts through it. There are other portions to the east of Mealhouse Brow and behind Nos. 9 to 13 Little Underbank.	II
St Mary's Church; 53.41126°N 2.15536°W		14th century (probable)	The church was largely rebuilt between 1813 and 1817 to designs by Lewis Wyatt, and alterations were carried out by J. S. Crowther in 1881–82. It is in stone with slate roofs, and consists of a nave, a lower chancel with a former north chapel, and a west tower with north and south porches. The tower has buttresses, clock faces, an embattled pierced parapet, and octagonal corner pinnacles with crocketed finials. Along the sides of the nave the buttresses rise to crocketed pinnacles, and the parapets are embattled. The east window has six lights with Decorated tracery. Inside the church are galleries on the north and south sides.	I
Staircase House; 53.41164°N 2.15638°W		Late 15th century	At first a town house, it was later extended and used for other purposes, and converted into a museum. Originally a three-bay cruck house, later extended in timber framing, then stone, and refronted in brick in the 19th century; the roof is slated. It has two and three storeys with attics and cellars, and a front of three bays with a modern shop front, and two-light windows above.	II*
Former Angel Inn; 53.41156°N 2.15736°W		16th century (probable)	The building, which has a timber framed core, has been altered and extended through the centuries. It is in two parts; to the left is the former public house, and to the right is a shop. The pub has two storeys and a blind attic, and three bays. On the ground floor is a modern shopfront, and above the front is plastered, with a band and cornice, and a moulded parapet and cornice. The upper floor is rusticated and contains three windows, above which is a decorated frieze, and in the attic are cruciform panels. The shop to the right has three storeys and three narrow bays. Above the modern shopfront, it is in red brick and terracotta, and has decorative pilasters and panels, and windows. At the top is a balustraded parapet with urns, flanking a semicircular arch with a keystone and decoration in the tympanum.	II
10 Great Underbank; 53.41174°N 2.15816°W		16th century	Originally a manor house, Underbank Hall, later a bank, is timber framed with two storeys and attics, and three gabled bays. The upper floor and the gables are jettied, and the gables have decorative bargeboards and finials. In the front is a projecting two-storey flat-roofed porch, and the windows are mullioned and transomed.	II*
Top o'the Green Farmhouse; 53.39498°N 2.10382°W		16th century	A timber framed house with brick nogging and a stone-slate roof. There are two storeys, four bays, and single-storey extensions to the left and the rear. In the first bay is a recessed porch and a casement window. The third and fourth bays contain a bow window, a casement window and a porch. Inside the house is a closed cruck frame.	II
30 and 32 Great Underbank; 53.41108°N 2.15868°W		16th or early 17th century	The Three Shires Hall, originally a town house and later used for other purposes, it is timber framed, and has two storeys and two bays. Both bays are gabled, the gables have bargeboards and finials, and the upper floor and gables are jettied. There are two shop fronts, one modern and the other older, and the windows are 19th-century casements. The gables are decorated with quatrefoils, and on the upper floor are curved braces and herringbone decoration.	II
Shoresfold Cottages; 53.43344°N 2.17517°W		16th to 17th century (probable)	A pair of sandstone cottages with a stone-slate roof. They have a linear plan, two low storeys, and four bays. There are two doorways, and the windows are horizontally-sliding sashes.	II
2 and 4 Vale Close; 53.41240°N 2.20352°W		17th century (probable)	A pair of timber framed houses with an 18th-century extension to the south, they have square panels and brick nogging. The roof is in Welsh slate roof, and the windows are casements.	II
Halliday Hill Farmhouse; 53.39770°N 2.11164°W		17th century	The farmhouse is in rendered stone on a plinth, with a first floor band and a stone-slate roof. It has two storeys, three bays and a small rear wing. The windows are mullioned, and the house contains upper crucks.	II
Shady Oak Farmhouse; 53.39512°N 2.10688°W		17th century	The farmhouse is in roughcast stone and has a tiled roof. There are two storeys, three bays, and a projecting wing to the right. The central bay projects forward, it is gabled, and contains a doorway with a moulded surround and has a hood on brackets. The windows are mullioned.	II
4 and 6 Marple Old Road; 53.39504°N 2.10095°W		1697	Originally a farmhouse, later divided into two dwellings. It is in brick with a band, and has a stone-slate roof. There are two storeys with attics, three gabled bays, and a later lean-to on the left. In the first bay is a 20th-century porch, in the second bay is a door with a fanlight, and the windows are casements.	II
Offerton Hall Farmhouse; 53.39604°N 2.11735°W		c. 1700	The farmhouse was much altered and extended in the early 19th century. It is in brick on a projecting brick plinth, and has a stone-slate roof. The farmhouse has an irregular plan with two storeys and fronts of five and three bays. In the third bay of the main front is a later porch, the fourth bay projects slightly, and the fifth bay projects more, and is gabled. The windows are mullioned and transomed, and contain casements.	II
Honeysuckle Cottage, Rose Cottage, Rose Lea Cottage, and Hill View Cottage; 53.39494°N 2.10131°W		17th or early 18th century	Originally a farmhouse, later divided into separate dwellings, it has two storeys. The main block is in red brick with a stone-slate roof, and there is a modern single-storey extension to the right. The rear wing is at right angles, and is in rendered brick with a roof of old slate and Welsh slate. The windows are mainly modern.	II
Shores Fold Farmhouse; 53.43369°N 2.17509°W		Late 17th or early 18th century (probable)	A farmhouse, later a private house, in brick with a stone-slate roof, it has a rectangular plan, two storeys and two bays. On the front is a gabled porch and a doorway with pilasters and a pediment, and at the rear are horizontally-sliding sash windows.	II
16A and 18 Middle Hillgate; 53.40739°N 2.15519°W		1715	A house and shop in brick, partly rendered, with a wood eaves cornice, and a Welsh slate roof. There are two storeys, six bays, and a gable pediment in the centre of the top floor. In the first two bays is a modern shop front, to the right the doorway has a fanlight, and the windows are sashes. The rainwater-head is dated, initialled and decorated.	II
27 Higher Hillgate; 53.40421°N 2.15334°W		1742	A brick house with a dentil eaves cornice, three storeys, and a symmetrical front of three bays. There is a three-storey rear wing with a modillion eaves cornice. Steps lead up the central doorway, which has Greek Ionic half-columns, an open pediment, and a semicircular fanlight. The windows have mullions and transoms.	II
Former Rectory; 53.41000°N 2.15310°W		1743	The rectory, later used for other purposes, is in brick with stone dressings, rusticated quoins, a moulded wood eaves cornice, and a Welsh slate roof. It has three storeys, a symmetrical front of five bays, and a single-storey three-bay extension to the right. The central bay protrudes slightly and contains a doorway with Ionic columns, an entablature, a dentilled pediment, and a segmental fanlight.	II*
23 Higher Hillgate; 53.40474°N 2.15355°W		Mid-18th century	A brick house on a stone plinth, with three storeys and a symmetrical front of five bays. The central bay projects slightly and contains a doorway with Roman Ionic pilasters, a rusticated surround, a pediment, and a segmental moulded frieze. The windows on the lower two floors have keystones.	II
The Strawberry Gardens public house 53.40230°N 2.13280°W		Mid to late 18th century	The public house is in brick with a stone-slate roof. It has two storeys and two bays. The central doorway has a rectangular fanlight, and the windows are mullioned and transomed. There is a taller range at the rear.	II
St Peter's Church; 53.40943°N 2.15998°W		1768	Vestries flanking the tower added in about 1838, and the chancel was built in 1888. The church is in brick with stone dressings and a slate roof. It consists of a nave, an apsidal chancel, and a west tower flanked by vestries. The tower has three stages, the lower two stages are square and the top bell stage is octagonal with a copper-roofed dome. There is a round-headed west doorway with a triple keystone and impost pilasters. In the middle stage are Venetian windows, some blocked, and the top stage has louvred bell openings, and a clock face on the east. The windows in the body of the church are round-headed with Y-tracery.	II
German's Buildings; 53.39660°N 2.15016°W		Late 18th century	A terrace of four brick cottages with a slate roof. They have two storeys, each cottage has a double-depth plan, and one bay. Some of the windows are casements and others are horizontally-sliding sashes.	II
Premises occupied by The P H Press Ltd; 53.40848°N 2.15205°W		1788	Originally a Congregational church, later used for other purposes, it is in red brick and has two storeys. The entrance front has three bays and is gabled. There are two doorways with plain pilasters and open pediments. Between the doorways and in the centre of the upper floor are Venetian windows. The other windows have round heads, and in the gable is a quatrefoil. There are two tiers of windows along the sides.	II
Crown Inn; 53.41240°N 2.20321°W		Late 18th or early 19th century	The public house is in brick with a slate roof. It has an L-shaped plan, consisting of a main range and a gabled cross-wing to the right. The windows are sashes with segmental heads.	II
1 Great Underbank, and 26 and 28 Bridge Street Brow; 53.41193°N 2.15778°W		Late 18th or early 19th century	A shop on a corner site with premises to the rear in brick with a modillion eaves cornice and a Welsh slate roof. There are three storeys, the shop has three bays on Great Underbank and one on Bridge Street Brow. On the ground floor is a late 19th-century shop front, and above are sash windows with segmental arches and keystones. The premises behind are rendered and have modern windows.	II
4 Park Street; 53.41186°N 2.15654°W	—	Late 18th or early 19th century	A brick shop with a modillion eaves cornice, three storeys and three bays. On the ground floor is a modern shop front, and above are sash windows.	II
10–12 Little Underbank; 53.41101°N 2.15763°W		Late 18th or early 19th century	Originally a shop with the Queen's Head public house added in the later 19th century, the building is in brick with a moulded eaves cornice and three storeys. On the ground floor the pub has a doorway and a window with Gothic glazing, and the shop has a modern shop front. On the upper floors, the pub has sash windows, and the shop has casements.	II
13 and 15 Great Underbank; 53.41161°N 2.15792°W		Late 18th or early 19th century	A pair of brick shops with a modillion eaves cornice and three storeys. On the ground floor are modern shop fronts, and above are sash windows, three on the middle floor and two on the top floor.	II
25 Market Place; 53.41173°N 2.15731°W		Late 18th or early 19th century	A brick house with a Welsh slate roof, three storeys and four bays. The doorways have plain pilasters, entablatures, and fanlights, and the windows are sashes.	II
26 and 27 Market Place and 1 Park Street; 53.41188°N 2.15686°W		Late 18th or early 19th century	Two shops on a corner site in brick with a modillion eaves cornice, and a Welsh slate roof, hipped to the right. There are three storeys and a front of three bays. On the ground floor are two 19th-century shop fronts with console brackets, and above are sash windows.	II
28 and 28A Market Place; 53.41177°N 2.15666°W		Late 18th or early 19th century	A pair of red brick shops on a corner site, with a modillion eaves cornice, and three storeys. The front on Market Place has three bays, and that in Park Street has four. On the ground floor is a 19th-century shop front, the windows on Park Street are sashes, and those on Market Place are modern replacements.	II
40 Sandy Lane; 53.41962°N 2.15958°W		Late 18th or early 19th century	A brick house with a modillion eaves cornice and a slate roof, hipped to the right. It has two storeys with a basement and three bays. Two steps lead up to a central doorway that has attached Doric columns, an open pediment, and a semicircular fanlight.	II
213 Chestergate; 53.40832°N 2.16890°W		Late 18th or early 19th century	A brick house with a modillion eaves cornice and a Welsh slate roof. There are two storeys and a symmetrical front of three bays. The central doorway has attached columns, an open pediment and a semicircular fanlight, and the window are sashes.	II
Glebe House; 53.40811°N 2.14811°W		Late 18th or early 19th century	A brick house on a rendered plinth, with two storeys and three bays. Three steps lead up to a central doorway that has semicircular Doric columns, an open pediment, and a fanlight. The windows are sashes with rusticated stucco lintels and keystones. On front of the house is a low rendered wall and eight panelled piers.	II
Portwood Bridge; 53.41422°N 2.15601°W		Late 18th or early 19th century	The bridge carries Howard Street over the River Goyt. It is in sandstone, and consists of two semi-elliptical arches with plain voussoirs. The central pier has cutwaters on both sides, and the bridge has plain central and terminal pilasters, a band, a flat deck, and parapets with ridged coping. In the southwest corner is a blocked semicircular arch, and on the west parapet is a post with an inscribed cast iron band.	II
Ridge Cottages; 53.39577°N 2.10844°W		18th or early 19th century	A row of brick cottages with a slate roof, two storeys and five bays. The windows are casements, those on the ground floor having segmental heads, and there are two modern doors.	II
Gateway and fountain, St Mary's Church; 53.41133°N 2.15590°W		1812	The gateway consists of a stone Gothic screen by Lewis Wyatt. There are three pointed arches, the outer arches smaller and angled backwards, with crocketed finials over the centre arch. The wall to the left contains a granite drinking fountain dated 1858, with two moulded steps below.	II*
Woodbank Villa and portico 53.41004°N 2.13110°W		1812–1814	A country house by Thomas Harrison in Greek Revival style. The house is in sandstone on a plinth, and has a moulded string course, a plain frieze with a moulded cornice and a hipped slate roof. There are two storeys with a basement, three bays, and a central curved portico with four Greek Ionic monolithic columns. In the outer bays are three-light mullioned windows and segmental-headed tympani on the ground floor and sash windows above. At the entrance to the drive is a Greek Revival portico with two fluted columns and two square pilasters.	II*
The Arden Arms; 53.41198°N 2.15499°W		c. 1815	A brick public house on a corner site with a wooden eaves cornice and a Welsh slate roof. It has three storeys with cellars, a front of four bays on Corporation Street and one bay on Millgate. The doorway has a reeded architrave and a fanlight, the windows on the ground floor are casements, and on the upper floors they are sashes. There is a similar doorway in the left return, and at the rear is a tall stair window.	II
St Thomas' Church; 53.40357°N 2.15504°W		1822–1825	A Commissioners' church by George Basevi in Classical style, with the chancel added in 1890 by J. Medland Taylor. The church is in ashlar stone, and consists of a nave, north and south aisles, north and south porches, a chancel, and a west tower. The tower has pedimented bell openings, a stage with clock faces and ball finials, and an open cupola that has eight square shafts with Corinthian caps. At the east end is an Ionic portico with six fluted columns and a pediment. Inside the church are galleries on three sides on fluted Corinthian columns.	I
Wellington Bridge; 53.40955°N 2.16283°W		1824–1826	The bridge was built by the Manchester and Buxton Turnpike Trust, and carries Wellington Road South (the A6 road) over the valley of the River Mersey. It is in gritstone, partly rendered, concrete and cast iron. The bridge consists of eleven segmental arches of varying spans. The arch spanning the river is 27.4 metres (90 ft) wide and is 15 metres (49 ft) tall.	II
8 Market Place; 53.41118°N 2.15654°W		Early 19th century	A brick shop with a modillion eaves cornice, three storeys and a basement, and a front of two bays. On the ground floor is a bowed shop front, and the windows are sashes, those on the middle floor with stuccoed lintels. Underneath is a curved basement in rusticated stone.	II
9 and 11 Little Underbank; 53.41116°N 2.15765°W		Early 19th century	A pair of brick shops, No. 11 rendered, with a modillion eaves cornice, three storeys, and two bays each. On the ground floor are modern shop fronts, on the upper floor of No. 9 are casement windows with segmental heads, and No. 11 has modern replacements.	II
16 and 18 Great Underbank; 53.41151°N 2.15824°W		Early 19th century	A brick building, the upper two floors rendered, with a first floor band, three storeys, three bays, and sash windows. On the ground floor is a round-headed doorway with an architrave and a fanlight, to the left are four windows, and to the right is a modern shop front.	II
16–26 Little Underbank; 53.41089°N 2.15715°W		Early 19th century	A row of brick shops with a modillion eaves cornice and three storeys. They have modern shop fronts on the ground floor and sash windows above. Nos. 24 and 26 have later mansard roofs in Welsh slate.	II
19 Great Underbank; 53.41152°N 2.15795°W		Early 19th century	A brick shop with three storeys and four bays. On the ground floor is a modern shop front, and above are sash windows, those on the top floor having segmental heads.	II
19 and 21 Little Underbank; 53.41104°N 2.15709°W		Early 19th century	A pair of brick shops with three storeys and two bays each. On the ground floor are modern shop fronts, and on the upper floors are sash windows; the middle floor of No. 19 contains one window with a segmental head and a keystone.	II
21 and 23 Great Underbank; 53.41144°N 2.15802°W		Early 19th century	A rendered shop with a wooden eaves cornice, three storeys and four bays. On the ground floor is a modern shop front, and each floor above contains three windows and one blocked window.	II
23 and 25 Little Underbank; 53.41099°N 2.15691°W		Early 19th century	A shop, later used for other purposes, rendered and carved to resemble stone, with a parapet and a slate roof. There are three storeys and five bays. Below the parapet are five recessed panels with dentils, and the windows are replacements. On the front is a clock set at right angles, and around it are three round niches, above which are bells with pediments. The niches contain figures of a guardsman, a sailor, and Father Time. On the ground floor is an original shop front to the left, and a modern shop front to the right.	II
24–28 Great Underbank; 53.41116°N 2.15853°W		Early 19th century (probable)	A brick shop with rusticated quoins, a modern wood parapet, three storeys and six bays. On the ground floor is a modern shop front, and on the upper floors are sash windows.	II
31 Parsonage Road; 53.42087°N 2.18195°W		Early 19th century or earlier	A brick house with a slate roof, two storeys and three bays. On the front is a gabled porch, and the windows are modern with keystones. In a link to an outbuilding are the remains of timber framing.	II
34 Market Place; 53.41154°N 2.15616°W		Early 19th century	A brick shop with a modillion eaves cornice. It has three storeys and three bays, and contains a 19th-century shop front.	II
41 and 43 Greek Street; 53.40315°N 2.16153°W		Early 19th century	A pair of brick houses on a rendered plinth, with a sill band and a Welsh slate roof. They have two storeys and two bays each. The doorways have Greek Ionic columns, ornamental friezes and radiating fanlights, and the windows are sashes with stone lintels.	II
78 and 80 Churchgate; 53.40926°N 2.15248°W		Early 19th century	A pair of brick houses on a stone plinth, with a modillion eaves cornice, three storeys with basements, and five bays. Steps lead up to the doorways, which have attached columns, open pediments, and semicircular fanlights. The windows are sashes.	II
96 Churchgate; 53.40902°N 2.15161°W		Early 19th century	A roughcast house with a modillion eaves cornice and a hipped Welsh slate roof. There are two storeys, four bays, and a single-storey extension to the left. The doorway has fluted pilasters, a small frieze, and an ornamental semicircular fanlight. The windows are sashes.	II
Beech House, coach house and front railings 53.37759°N 2.11491°W		Early 19th century	A brick house and coach house with slate roofs. The house has a stone plinth, a double-depth plan, two storeys and an attic, and three bay. The central doorway has a semicircular head, side panels, enriched consoles, and an ornate radial fanlight. The windows are sashes with stone sills and brick heads. At the rear the central bay is gabled and contains a stair window and a circular attic window. The coach house to the right has three elliptical-headed doorways, a lunette to the right, and a gable pediment containing an oeil-de-boeuf window. In front of the house are ornate cast iron railings and gates.	II
Boar's Head Hotel; 53.41196°N 2.15695°W		Early 19th century	A public house in brick on a stone plinth, with stone dressings, quoins, and three storeys. It is on a corner site, with four bays on Vernon Street and one on Market Place. The round-headed doorway has a semicircular fanlight, and the windows are sashes with stuccoed lintels.	II
Star and Garter public house 53.40322°N 2.15298°W		Early 19th century	A brick public house on a rendered plinth. with a first floor sill band and a slate roof. It has three storeys and a symmetrical front of five bays. The central doorway has Doric half-columns, an open pediment, and a round-arched fanlight.	II
Wellington Mill; 53.40855°N 2.16240°W		1828	A cotton mill, then a hat works, and later a museum, it is in brick and has a slate roof with coped gables, and an internal structure of cast iron beams and brick arches. The main block has seven storeys, 18 bays, and a rounded angle turret.	II
1 and 3 Highfield Park; 53.41290°N 2.19879°W		c. 1830	A pair of stuccoed brick houses with a Welsh slate roof. They have two storeys, five bays, a single-storey single-bay extension to the front left, and a two-storey three-bay wing to the rear right. In the third bay is a porch that has a Tudor arched doorway with a fanlight, a hood mould and an embattled parapet. In the first and second bays are rectangular bay windows containing casement windows with transoms. In the fourth and fifth bays is a canted bay window containing sashes. The windows on the upper floor are paired sashes with Tudor arched heads. The second and fourth bays are gabled.	II
Stockport Infirmary (Millennium House); 53.40578°N 2.15964°W		1832–1834	The hospital was designed by Richard Lane in Greek Revival style, and was extended between 1870 and 1872, and again from 1898 to 1900, then converted into offices in the 1990s. It is in ashlar stone, and has two storeys, a basement, and a later attic storey. The front is symmetrical, the ground floor is rusticated, and there is a front of 21 bays. In the centre is a tetrastyle Doric portico with a full entablature, a frieze with wreaths, and a pediment containing a clock face, and at the ends are pavilions with pilasters and pediments.	II
Mauldeth Hall; 53.42623°N 2.19680°W		1832–1840	A country house later used for other purposes, it is in Greek Revival style. An east wing was added during the 1840s, and it was substantially rebuilt between 1880 and 1882. The house is in ashlar stone with bands, a cornice, a parapet, and a hipped slate roof. There are two storeys and a symmetrical entrance front of seven bays. The central three bays form a Greek Doric portico that has a doorway with a moulded surround. The right return has Ionic unfluted pilasters and a pediment, and in the left return is a two-storey rounded bay.	II
Former King's Arms public house 53.41196°N 2.15759°W		Early to mid-19th century	The former public house is in brick and has three storeys. The original part has four bays, with a two-bay extension to the right. On the ground floor are modern shop windows with pilasters and a fascia, and above are sash windows with rusticated lintels and keystones.	II
Railway viaduct 53.40924°N 2.16566°W		1839–40	The viaduct was built by the Manchester and Birmingham Railway and designed by George W. Buck to carry the line over the valley of the River Mersey. It was widened on the west side in 1888–89. The viaduct is in brick with stone caps, a dentil cornice, moulded impost bands, and rusticated piers. It has 28 arches, it is about 111 feet (34 m) over the river, and is more than 1,791 yards (1,638 m) long.	II*
7, 9 and 11 Millgate; 53.41164°N 2.15586°W		c. 1840	Originally a hotel and a house, later converted into flats, they are in red brick with a Welsh slate roof. They have three storeys, No. 7 has three bays, and Nos. 9 and 11 have one. Both parts have round-headed doorways, No. 7 also has impost bands and a fanlight, and both parts have sash windows.	II
St Thomas' Hospital and rear wing 53.40208°N 2.16000°W		1841	Originally a workhouse, later converted and used for other purposes, it is in red brick on a plinth, with rusticated quoins, a stone band, a string cornice and a Welsh slate roof. The original block has two storeys and five bays, the outer bays projecting forward and containing double doors with pilasters, a fanlight and a flat hood on consoles. The windows are sashes. The rear wing has three and four storeys. The central block is canted with five bays, and has a campanile with a clock and a lead cupola. It is flanked by links to end pavilions.	II
Christ Church; 53.41440°N 2.16777°W		1844–1846	This was a Commissioners' church, but only the steeple and west walls of the aisles remain, and it is in the care of the Churches Conservation Trust. The remains are in stone. The steeple has a tower with an Early English portal, a west window, clock faces, a pierced parapet with angel corbels and corner and intermediate pinnacles, and a recessed spire.	II
St John the Baptist's Church; 53.41258°N 2.20688°W		1846–1850	The chancel was added in 1891, and the spire was removed in 1995. The church is in sandstone with a Welsh slate roof, and consists of a nave, a south porch, a chancel with a north vestry and a west tower. The tower has three stages, angle buttresses, a west door, clock faces, and a parapet with pinnacles. The windows in the tower and the body of the church are lancets.	II
Wycliffe Congregational Chapel; 53.41284°N 2.16775°W		1849	The Congregational church designed by Edward Walters in Gothic style, is in stone and has a modern roof. It consists of a nave and aisles under separate roofs. Steps lead up to the doorways pointed arches and hood moulds in the ends of the aisles. In front of the entrances are railings, gates and four gabled gate piers.	II
Beechwood; 53.41235°N 2.20775°W		c. 1850	Originally the rectory to St John's Church, it is in red brick with dressings in blue brick. It has two storeys and steep gables with decorative bargeboards. The windows are mullioned and transomed.	II
10 St John's Road; 53.41307°N 2.20693°W		Mid-19th century	Built as the school house to St John's School, it is in red brick with stone quoins and a Welsh slate roof. The house has an L-shaped plan, two storeys, steep gables, and windows with trefoil heads.	II
13 Little Underbank; 53.41116°N 2.15750°W		Mid-19th century	A shop incorporating an archway and steps leading up to Market Place. It has three storeys, four bays, and a flat roof. The ground floor is in rusticated stone with three large keystones, and contains a modern shop front. To the right is a rusticated archway with a keystone and containing steps. The upper floors are in brick with bands, and contain sash windows, three on the middle floor and four on the top floor.	II
Bull's Head public house 53.41132°N 2.15701°W		Mid-19th century	The former public house is stuccoed, and has paired bracketed eaves, three storeys and four bays. On the ground floor are pilasters and a fascia, and the windows on the middle floor have cornices.	II
Wear Mill; 53.40886°N 2.16648°W		Mid-19th century	An integrated cotton mill, incorporating some 18th-century material, and rebuilt in 1884, it is in brick with slate roofs, and internally has cast iron columns and brick arches. The earliest part has six storeys and was built in three phases, the later main part has six storeys, sides of 15 and six bays, a squat Italianate tower, and an integral engine house. There is also an octagonal tapering chimney, a five-storey block with an engine house in the basement, a single-storey range curving on the corner of the street, a three-bay block containing the 18th-century wheelhouse, and a weaving shed with five roof ridges passing under the railway viaduct.	II
Four Corinthian capitals 53.40516°N 2.15837°W		19th century	The Corinthian capitals are from columns in a demolished house. They are now used as tables in a public garden.	II
St John's Primary School, Heaton Mersey; 53.41310°N 2.20659°W		19th century	Later Stella Maris School, it is in red brick and has a Welsh slate roof with ridge tiles. It has a single storey, steep gables, lancet windows, a truncated turret, and a small rose window in a dormer.	II
The Farm Produce Hall; 53.41164°N 2.15735°W		1852	The hall has an ashlar front, and the upper storey was added in 1875. There are three bays, and the rusticated ground floor contains three round-headed openings. On the upper storey are four engaged Corinthian columns on a cornice with consoles brackets. Above the windows are semicircular niches with shell decoration and console keystones, and at the top is a dentil cornice and a parapet with balustrades and panels.	II
St Matthew's Church, Edgeley; 53.40273°N 2.16942°W		1855–1858	The church was designed by J. S. Crowther, and the steeple was added in 1866. It is in sandstone with a roof of stone-slate, and consists of a nave with a clerestory, north and south aisles, a south porch, a chancel with a north vestry, and a west steeple. The steeple has a four-stage tower and a broach spire with traceried and gabled lucarnes.	II
Vernon Hall; 53.41197°N 2.14142°W		1860	The museum, in Vernon Park, was extended in 1866. It is in brick with stone dressings, a sill band, a corbel table, a dentilled band, a slate roof with roof lights, and a terracotta ridge. The museum has an L-shaped plan, with the extension forming a cross-wing, and has two storeys. The original part has five bays with a gabled roof, and the extension has a hipped roof. The doorway has a stone architrave with a keystone and a grotesque mask that forms part of a frieze linking the flanking pilasters, and above it is a pediment. The ground floor bays are separated by rusticated pilasters, and in most of the bays are round-arched sash windows. The upper floor is mainly blind, but does contain brick panels, stone roundels, and some sash windows.	II
Market Hall; 53.41144°N 2.15652°W		1861	The market hall has a base of wood panels and a superstructure in iron and glass. Its plan is that of an irregular parallelogram with eight gabled bays. The building has thin pilasters with carved capitals and simple tracery.	II
St Joseph's Church; 53.40955°N 2.15780°W		1861–62	A Roman Catholic church designed by Matthew Ellison Hadfield in High Victorian Gothic style. It is in Yorkshire gritstone with dressings of Hollington stone, and slate roofs. The church consists of a nave with a clerestory, north and south aisles, a three-sided apse, and the base of a tower to the south. At the west end is a doorway with an ogee head and a gable with crockets.	II
The Armoury of the Cheshire Regiment; 53.40328°N 2.16199°W		1862	The armoury of the Cheshire Regiment, later used by the Territorial Army, is in red brick with stone dressings. The block facing the street has a stone-coped plinth, a hipped roof, two storeys and four bays. On the ground floor is a continuous band of slit windows, the upper floor has windows with pointed heads, and in the roof are gabled dormers. On the corner is a polygonal tower with rusticated quoins and a cornice. At the top is a lantern of lancet lights, and a steep copper spire.	II
Houldsworth Mill; 53.43637°N 2.16547°W		1865	A cotton spinning mill, later used for other purposes, it is in red brick with slate roofs, and in Italianate style. It is a double mill with a symmetrical front. In the centre is a block with five storeys and nine bays, flanked by blocks with four storeys and 18 bays, and the mill is about twelve bays deep. The central block has a clock and a dated plaque in the parapet, and it is flanked by stair towers with pyramidal roofs. At the rear are an octagonal chimney stack with a corbelled top, and an engine house.	II*
St Petersgate Bridge; 53.41102°N 2.15740°W		1866–1868	The bridge is a road bridge carrying St Petersgate over Little Underbank. It is in brick, and has stone piers, parapets, dressings, and steps, and a cast iron deck and balustrades. There are five brick arches, into which two properties are incorporated. The piers have dentil cornices, segmental pediments and domed caps, and the iron deck has a cartouche with coats of arms on each side.	II
Houldsworth Working Men's Club; 53.43775°N 2.16254°W		1874	The club was designed by Abraham Henthorn Stott, and is in brick with stone dressings, and a roof with bands of slate and red tiles. It has two storeys and a U-shaped plan with rear wings, and there are later extensions to the rear. On the front are eight bays, the seventh bay wider and gabled. In the fifth bay is a gabled porch, the ground floor has mullioned and transomed windows, the upper floor windows have round-arched heads, and in the roof are three gabled dormers. In the left return is a two-storey bow window with a conical roof.	II*
Houldsworth School; 53.43902°N 2.16351°W		1874	The school, designed by Alfred Waterhouse in late Gothic style, is in red brick with stone dressings and has a slate roof. It has an E-shaped plan, with a central range and projecting gabled wings. The windows are mullioned and transomed, there are dormers in the roof, and on the front is a porch.	II*
Wall to west of Houldsworth School; 53.43913°N 2.16379°W		1874	The wall to the west of the school is contemporary with it, and is in brick with stone coping. On the wall are iron railings.	II*
Meadow Mill; 53.41777°N 2.15244°W		1870s	The mill is in red brick with a basement of blue brick, and internally has a cast iron frame and brick arches. The main block has seven storeys, basements, and 41 bays. Most of the windows have segmental heads, and those in the top floor are paired with round-arched heads. The central six bays form a feature, the outer bays projecting, and containing windows with stone surrounds, arcades and carved capitals. At the top of the mill is a brick arcaded bracket cornice and a stone parapet. At the rear is a tall one-story wing, a chimney, and a gatehouse.	II
Tame Viaduct; 53.43944°N 2.14219°W		1875	The viaduct was built by the Sheffield and Midland Railway Companies' Committee to carry its line over the valley of the River Tame. It is in brick with a cornice and stone imposts, and consists of 16 semicircular arches.	II
Bakers Vaults public house 53.41183°N 2.15726°W		Late 19th century	A brick public house on a stone plinth with a moulded string course, a modillion cornice, and a hipped roof. There are two storeys, a front of three bays, and five bays along the side. On the front the outer bays contain round-headed doorways with semicircular fanlights, and in the middle bay is a pair of round-headed windows in a round-headed arch containing a laurel wreath. Above this is a window with a segmental head, a moulded surround, and with a moulded apron, the other windows having segmental heads and hood moulds.	II
Carrington Memorial; 53.39802°N 2.14919°W		Late 19th century	The memorial to members of the Carrington family is in Stockport Cemetery. It is in sandstone and consists of a large rectangular chest tomb in Romanesque style. The tomb has a moulded plinth, an arcade of fluted pilasters and arches with shell and flame motifs in the tympani. In the arcades are plaques in carved relief or bronze inscribed with family names. Above the arcade is an entablature with an egg-and-dart and dentilled architrave, an inscribed frieze, and a moulded cornice. The lid has a roof-like shape, with chamfered ends and a moulded cornice.	II
Vernon Mill; 53.41426°N 2.14581°W		Late 19th century	A former cotton mill in red brick and terracotta, internally with a steel frame and cast iron columns. It has four storeys and fronts of 15 and eight bays, the left three bays projecting. In the angle is an Italianate tower with angle pilasters, a lettered parapet, and a tiled roof with wrought iron cresting, and at the northwest corner is another tower. The windows have metal frames, between them are pilasters, there are moulded sill bands between the floors, and at the top are modillion eaves and a parapet.	II
St Paul's Church, Heaton Moor; 53.42231°N 2.18590°W		1876–77	The church was extended to the east in 1896, and the tower was added in 1900. The church is in sandstone with a slate roof, and consists of a nave, a southwest porch, a chancel with a northeast vestry, and a southeast tower. The tower has four stages, an east doorway, a south window, and angle buttresses rising to form pinnacles. It is surmounted by an octagonal lantern with louvred windows and a pierced embattled parapet.	II
Former London and North Western Railway goods warehouse 53.41456°N 2.16885°W		1877	The goods warehouse, built by the London and North Western Railway Company, is in Italianate style. It is in red brick on a blue brick plinth, with stone dressings, blue brick bands and a cornice and lettering in white brick. The warehouse has a trapezoid plan with four storeys and a basement, 33 bays in the east front, 32 on the west front, 13 on the north front, and 11 on the south front. On the west side are seven openings, with two on the south side, and two taking-in doors on the north. Most of the windows have segmental heads, impost blocks, and blue brick keystones.	II
Engine house to former London and North Western Railway goods warehouse 53.41482°N 2.16938°W		c. 1877	The engine house is in Italianate style, and built in red brick on a stepped blue brick plinth, with stone dressings, blue brick bands, a white brick cornice and a slate roof. It has a square plan with two single-storey parallel ranges, and a square accumulator tower with a pyramidal roof to the southeast.	II
St Peter's Chambers; 53.40948°N 2.15883°W		c. 1880	A row of shops with chambers above, in brick with sandstone dressings, a slate roof, and two storeys. The five bays to the left have a central round-headed doorway with an elaborate surround, voussoirs, a keystone, and above it is a bust of St Peter and a round-headed sash window. In the outer bays the ground floor has modern shop fronts, and on the upper floor are three-light windows. The three bays to the right contain a round-headed doorway in the left bay with moulded imposts and a keystone, and a loggia of three round-headed openings to the right. In the central bay is a decorative oriel window with a gadrooned pedestal, over which is an iron balconette, and a broken triangular pediment. Flanking the oriel window are round-headed sash windows with sunflower motifs in the tympanum.	II
Pendlebury Hall; 53.41492°N 2.16057°W		1880–1882	Originally a memorial hall and orphanage, later used for other purposes, it is in red brick with stone dressings and slate roofs. In the centre is a tower with cupolas, and a doorway with carved spandrels, above which is an oriel window. Flanking this are two-storey blocks, including five-sided bay windows containing mullioned and transomed windows on the ground floor.	II
Prescott's Almshouses; 53.43454°N 2.15752°W		1882	A row of six almshouses in speckled brick on a plinth, with stone coping, detailing in red brick, sandstone dressings, and a tile roof with decorative ridge tiles. They have two storeys, one bay each, and gables with finials. The central house projects forward and has a doorway with a gabled porch and a tympanum containing a portrait relief of the founder; the other doorways have sloping canopies. Also included in the listing are the walls and gate piers enclosing the garden, and the outbuildings in the back yards.	II
St Elisabeth's Church, Reddish; 53.43798°N 2.16336°W		1882–83	The church, designed by Alfred Waterhouse, is in red brick with stone bands and dressings, a clay tile roof, and a lead spire. It consists of a nave with a clerestory, north and south aisles, a chancel with an apse, a north vestry and a south Lady Chapel, also with an apse, and a steeple at the southeast incorporating porches. The steeple has a tower linked to the south aisle by a flying bridge and steps, and has pinnacles and an octagonal spire.	I
St Elisabeth's Rectory; 53.43850°N 2.16354°W		1882–83	The rectory, designed by Alfred Waterhouse in Gothic style, is in red brick with stone dressings and a tile roof. The porch, gables and dormers are in Gothic style, and the windows are sashes.	II*
Wall to west and south of St Elisabeth's Church; 53.43770°N 2.16350°W		1882–83	The wall encloses the west and south sides of the churchyard and is contemporary with the church. It is in brick with stone bands and coping. Along the wall are stone piers, and the wall contains wooden gates.	II*
Wall to west of St Elisabeth's Rectory; 53.43851°N 2.16392°W		1882–83	The wall to the west of the rectory is contemporary with it, and is in brick with stone coping, and there are oak gates with ornamental iron hinges.	II*
Statue of Richard Cobden; 53.40913°N 2.15974°W		1886	The statue commemorates Richard Cobden, one of the founders of the Anti-Corn Law League and a local Member of Parliament. It is by George Gammon Adams, and consists of a standing bronze figure on a stone plinth.	II
St George's Schools; 53.39673°N 2.15325°W		1893	The infant school was built first, and both schools are in Elizabethan style. They are built in red brick on a stone-capped plinth, with stone dressings. The senior school has two storeys, with a two-storey canted bay, and two single-storey bays. The windows are mullioned and transomed, and there are four gables. The infant school is similar, with one tall storey.	II
St George's Church, Heaviley; 53.39715°N 2.15203°W		1893–1898	The church, designed by Hubert Austin in Perpendicular style, is in Runcorn sandstone. It consists of a nave, with a clerestory, north and south aisles, north and south porches, a steeple at the crossing, and a chancel and sanctuary with a Lady Chapel to the north, an organ chamber to the south, and a vestry to the southeast. The steeple has a tower with an embattled parapet and corner pinnacles linked by flying buttresses to the spire, which rises to a height of 230 feet (70 m). The east and west windows have seven lights, and the windows along the sides of the nave have four lights.	I
Heaton Moor United Reformed Church and Sunday School; 53.42374°N 2.18107°W		1896	Originally a Congregational Church, later a Greek Orthodox Church, it was designed by Darbyshire and Smith in Gothic style. It is in sandstone with a Welsh slate roof, and consists of a nave with a clerestory, north and south aisles, north and south transepts, a chancel, and a southwest steeple. The steeple has a doorway, a bell stage with clock faces in gables between which are shafts with pinnacles, and a clasping octagonal spire. To the northwest is a Sunday school in a simpler style.	II
St George's Vicarage; 53.39727°N 2.15299°W		1896–1898	The vicarage is in red brick with a band and a roof of red tiles, and is in Arts and Crafts style. It has an irregular plan, two storeys and attics. The vicarage has a stone doorway, a canted bay window, and gables. Some windows are casements and others are sashes. The vicarage is in the process of demolition by Purcell Developments, who want to build eight houses at the site.	II
52 Wellington Road North; 53.41255°N 2.16684°W		1899	The building is in red brick with stone dressings, terracotta ornamentation, and a hipped tiled roof, and is in Jacobean style. It has a rectangular plan, with a canted corner, one storey, and sides of four and three bays. The doorway in the corner bay has an arched head and a fanlight, and at the top of the bay is a decorative panel containing the date, and a swan-neck pediment. Around the building are pilasters, a cornice, a decorative frieze, and a panelled parapet.	II
Former Union Bank; 53.41212°N 2.15775°W		1900	The former bank is in Renaissance style, and has an ashlar front with brick at the rear, and a slate roof. There are three storeys and attics, an asymmetrical front, a canted corner, and a rusticated ground floor. The corner bay contains the main entrance, and rises to a polygonal tower with three pedimented clock faces and a dome with a finial. The windows are rectangular, and in the middle two bays the windows on the top floor have a recessed round arch, and above them is a shaped gable. In the right bay is a doorway with a segmental pediment, and in the roof is a dormer with a shaped gable.	II
Bank Chambers; 53.41129°N 2.15720°W		Late 19th or early 20th century	The building is in brick with a rusticated ashlar ground floor on a plinth, stone dressings, bands, and a moulded cornice. There are three storeys and six bays. In the outer bays are round-headed doorways with keystones, the left doorway having granite columns, and a coat of arms in the tympanum; the inner bays contain round-headed windows. On the upper floors the outer bays are flanked by rusticated pilasters, and contain round-headed windows, with segmental-headed windows in the inner bays.	II
Heaton Moor Road electricity substation 53.41863°N 2.18793°W		c. 1902	The electrical substation is in red brick on a double plinth, with sandstone dressings, bands, an entablature, and a parapet. It is in Edwardian Baroque and has a roof of corrugated asbestos. The building has a rectangular plan with a slate-roofed outshut, and has nine bays separated by pilasters. There is a segmental-headed doorway with a keystone, a frieze with lettering, blocked oculi, blocked windows with moulded architraves, and a lunette window.	II
Broadstone House; 53.43437°N 2.16536°W		1903–1907	Originally a cotton mill, later used for other purposes, it was designed by Stott and Sons. It is in red brick on a steel frame, with terracotta bands and a moulded dentil eaves cornice. There are five storeys and a semi-basement and 36 bays. The windows have segmental heads, and at the north is an octagonal turret with a copper cupola.	II
The White Lion Hotel; 53.41133°N 2.15840°W		1904	A public house on a corner site in brick with stone dressings, some rendering, applied timber framing, and a tile roof. It has a main block of three storeys with attics, fronts of four and two bays and a curved corner bay with a tower, and a rear wing of two storeys. The corner bay has an entrance flanked by columns above which are mullioned and transomed windows, an oculus in a cartouche, and a tower with a projecting domed top. Other features include mullioned windows, gables on both fronts, jettied upper floors, an oriel window, and full-height pilasters flanking the entrance bay.	II
Town Hall; 53.40599°N 2.15852°W		1904–1908	The town hall was designed by Alfred Brumwell Thomas in free Baroque style. It has a front of Portland stone, and is in brick with Portland stone dressings elsewhere. The front is symmetrical and has a central entrance with paired columns and a broken segmental pediment containing a coat of arms. Framing this is a portico on each side with first floor columns and pediment, and above is a tower rising in diminishing stages, with clock faces, two tiers of open colonnades, and a polygonal top and crown finial. Flanking the entrance bays are five-bay wings with a rusticated ground floor and round-headed windows, and at the ends are projecting pavilions rusticated to the height of the cornice.	II*
Church of Our Lady and the Apostles; 53.40256°N 2.16123°W		1905	The Roman Catholic church, by Edmund Kirby, is in red Ruabon brick and terracotta with a Welsh slate roof. It consists of a nave with a clerestory and an apse, with north and south aisles and an ambulatory continuing round the apse. On the north side is a protruding baptistry, and two parallel ranges containing a chapel, confessionals, and vestries. At the west end is a large rose window above an arcade of lancet windows, all contained in a full-height arch under a gable with a cross finial. At ground level are two arched doorways under a traceried parapet with three pinnacles. The west front is flanked by turrets with spires.	II
Walls and gate piers to St George's Church and Schools; 53.39688°N 2.15315°W		1905	In front of the schools, and enclosing the churchyard are brick walls, and there is a stone gateway leading to the road.	II
Hollywood Park Centre; 53.40748°N 2.16894°W		1906–07	Originally a council school, later used for other purposes, it is in red brick with buff terracotta dressings and a Westmorland slate roof, red terracotta ridge tiles and finials. It has an irregular T-shaped plan, with the senior school facing the street and the junior school at right angles behind. The front of the senior school is symmetrical, and at each end is a stair tower with shaped gables and a pyramidal roof, between which are single-storey gabled bays.	II
223–245 Green Lane; 53.41618°N 2.17793°W		1907	A group of six pairs of almshouses arranged in a crescent. The houses are in pale brick with dressings in red brick and terracotta and Welsh slate roofs. They have a single storey and an attic. On the ground floor are round-headed doorways flanking mullioned and transomed windows, and in the roof are dormers with segmental gables. The outer pairs of houses also have a corner tower with a lead cupola. In front of the houses is a communal garden enclosed by a wall containing a gateway with a segmental arch over which is a shaped gable and segmental pediment.	II
North Reddish Infant and Junior School; 53.44517°N 2.15580°W		1907	Two schools, the junior school with an irregular H-shaped plan, and the infants school smaller, both mainly in a single storey. They are in red brick with stone dressings and bands, and have slate roofs with red ridge tiles and decorative finials. The gables have plastered tops, one with a shield in relief, and the windows are sashes, the larger windows mullioned and transomed. There is a block with an embattled parapet and a pyramidal roof.	II
Stockport College of Further Education; 53.40423°N 2.15947°W		1909–10	Originally a council school, it is in red brick with stone dressings, bands, a Westmorland slate roof, and terracotta ridge tiles. The college is in Renaissance style, and has a U-shaped plan. The front facing Greek Street has a central block of two storeys and four bays, and is flanked by four-storey square towers with shaped parapets and pyramidal roofs with ventilation cupolas. In the central block are segmental-headed windows with voussoirs and console keystones. The entrance is on the west front of the tower and is approached by curved steps with a balustrade. The doorway has a fanlight and a broken pediment, and to the right is a four-storey range with a shaped gable.	II
Alexandra Hotel; 53.40200°N 2.17552°W		1911	A public house in Baroque style, built in red brick on a granite plinth, with dressings in stone and terracotta, and a slate roof. It is on a corner site, with two storeys, a front of five bays, and single-storey bays to the right and at the rear. On the corner is a full-height octagonal bay window. In the centre is a doorway with a segmental pediment, above which is a window over which is a terracotta plaque, and a semicircular gablet containing a plaque with the date. On the ground floor are corner pilasters with floral decoration, joined by a first-floor cornice, and the windows are sashes. The right bay contains a canted bay window, and in the rear bay is a doorway.	II
Former District Bank; 53.40271°N 2.16206°W		1912	The former bank is in sandstone and timber framing with a coped slate roof, and has two storeys with a basement and three bays. The central bay is wide with a sandstone plinth and the upper part rising to a gabled dormer. The upper floor is jettied and carried on carved brackets, and the windows are mullioned and transomed. The outer bays are narrow and recessed. The left bay contains a narrow window with a Tudor arched head, and in the right bay is a doorway with a moulded surround, a Tudor ached head, carving in the spandrels, and an inscribed lintel.	II
43 Lower Hillgate; 53.40949°N 2.15541°W		1912–13	This was built as the Stockport Savings Bank, and is in brick on a granite plinth, with a front of Portland stone and a Welsh slate roof, and is in Baroque style. There are two storeys and three bays, with moulded string courses, an inscribed frieze, a dentil cornice, a balustraded parapet, and a pediment containing relief carving. The central round-headed doorway has a moulded keystone, and flanking it are round-headed windows. The central bay on the upper floor is flanked by paired engaged Ionic columns, and the windows are sashes with decorated aprons.	II
Stockport Central Library; 53.40815°N 2.16084°W		1912–13	The library, built with a grant from Andrew Carnegie was designed by Bradshaw Gass & Hope in Baroque style. It is in brick and Portland stone and has a Welsh slate roof. The library has an L-shaped plan with a rusticated stone plinth, two storeys, and fronts of six and seven bays, and a corner bay that has an octagonal cupola with a zinc-clad domed roof. At the top is a modillion cornice and an entablature with laurel wreaths. Above the main entrance is a scrolled pediment containing a coat of arms.	II
Clock and drinking fountain 53.43757°N 2.16017°W		1920	The clock and drinking fountain were a memorial to William Houldsworth. There is a stone plinth with a bronze portrait medallion, an inscription, and a niche for the drinking fountain. Standing on this are clustered columns in pink granite with carved capitals carrying a block with clock faces, gables, and a foliated finial.	II
War memorial, St George's Church, Heaviley; 53.39753°N 2.15196°W		c. 1920	The war memorial is in the churchyard, and is in sandstone. It has a tall octagonal base with a moulded cornice, a high moulded plinth on two octagonal steps, and a tall tapering octagonal cross shaft surmounted by a decorative cross. On the northeast side is a statue of Saint George sanding under a gabled, crocketed canopy, and on the other sides are flying buttresses. On the base are panels with inscriptions and the names of the members of the parish who died in the First World War.	II
War memorial, Heaton Moor; 53.42219°N 2.18542°W		1921	The war memorial is outside St Paul's Church, and consists of a bronze statue of a soldier by John Cassidy on a plinth of Portland stone. It stands in an enclosure bounded by a semicircular wall.	II
Swan with Two Necks public house 53.41201°N 2.16057°W		c. 1924	A small public house in brick with applied timber framing and stucco, and a slate roof. It has one bay and three storeys. On the ground floor is a doorway and a mullioned and transomed window, and both upper floors contain a bowed casement window.	II
War Memorial Art Gallery; 53.40478°N 2.15895°W		1925	The art gallery is in Portland stone and brick with slate roofs, and is in Greek Revival style. It has a modified T-shaped plan, with two side galleries, a first-floor picture gallery, and a full-height memorial hall to rear with a dome and an apsidal end wall. Steps lead up to the entrance, which has a portico with four Corinthian columns, a deep inscribed frieze with laurel wreaths, and a pediment containing a coat of arms. At the entrance is a cornice on scrolled consoles and a frieze with paterae. In the outer bays are windows, above which are cartouches.	II*
War memorial, Heaton Mersey; 53.41189°N 2.20657°W		1920s	The war memorial is in stone on granite steps, and consists of a coped pedestal, a tall tapering rectangular shaft, and a cross pattée with a halo. The south face of the cross is decorated with Celtic knotwork. On the north and south faces of the pedestal are bronze plaques with inscriptions and the names of those lost in the World Wars.	II
War memorial, South Reddish; 53.42438°N 2.15427°W		1920s	The war memorial is in stone, and has a three-stage base, a tapering pillar. and an entablature with an inscribed frieze. On this is a Celtic cross on a rocky base with a carved wreath on each face. On the cross are rosettes in relief and ropework carving. There are inscriptions on the base and the names of those lost in the First World War on the pillar.	II
War memorial, Stockport Cricket Club; 53.39424°N 2.15705°W		1920s (probable)	The war memorial stands in the cricket ground and is in Portland stone. It has a square three-stepped base, a square plinth, and a square cenotaph column carved with a laurel wreath in relief. On the plinth are columns with inscriptions and the names of the members of the club lost in the two World Wars.	II
Fearn Memorial; 53.39750°N 2.14954°W		Early 20th century	The memorial is in Stockport Cemetery and commemorates George Fearn, a brewer who paid for St George's Church, Heaviley. It is in sandstone and consists of a replica of the tower of the church. There are inscriptions on the east face of the tower and on the plinth.	II
Steps adjacent to Plaza Cinema; 53.40909°N 2.16160°W		1929	A double flight of steps in Portland stone, linking Wellington Road with Mersey Square. They include a series of high walls, and have three pairs of bronze lamp bases, and bronze railings.	II
Plaza Cinema; 53.40918°N 2.16140°W		1932–33	The cinema, in Art Deco style, is in brick on a steel frame with a front of faience. It has a symmetrical front of projecting and recessed planes. In the centre are giant fluted pilasters and a decorated parapet with a dog-tooth cornice and a high frieze. To the sides are openwork grilles, and the double doors have an Art Deco fountain motif.	II*
Guidepost; 53.40548°N 2.15856°W		1935	The guidepost stands near a road junction. It is in cast iron, and consists of a cylindrical post with four fingers, and is surmounted by an inscribed annular finial. The fingers point in the directions of north, south, northeast and southwest, and indicate the distances in miles to London, Hazel Grove, Macclesfield, and Buxton, Carlisle and Manchester, Marple, and Hyde, and Cheadle, Altrincham, and Chester.	II
Pair of K6 telephone kiosks 53.41137°N 2.15824°W		1935	A pair of K6 type telephone kiosks, designed by Giles Gilbert Scott. Constructed in cast iron with a square plan and a dome, they have three unperforated crowns in the top panels.	II
Shelter, Greek Street; 53.40473°N 2.15933°W		1937	The shelter, set into a wall, is in Portland stone and is in Greek Revival style. It has an open front, with two Corinthian columns, pilasters at the sides, an entablature, and a flat roof. Inside is a full-length wooden bench.	II
Shelter, Wellington Road South; 53.40468°N 2.15855°W		1937	The shelter, set into a wall, is in Portland stone and is in Greek Revival style. It has an open front, with two Corinthian columns, pilasters at the sides, an entablature, and a flat roof. Inside is a full-length wooden bench.	II
The Nursery Inn; 53.41497°N 2.17683°W		1939	A public house in brick with a rendered upper floor and a hipped Italian tile roof. There are two storeys, five bays on the front and six on the sides. The doorways have canopies with curved corners, and the windows are casements. At the rear is a single storey part with a bow window. Much of the interior is unaltered.	II
