= Strawberry Gardens =

Listed pub in Stockport, Greater Manchester, England

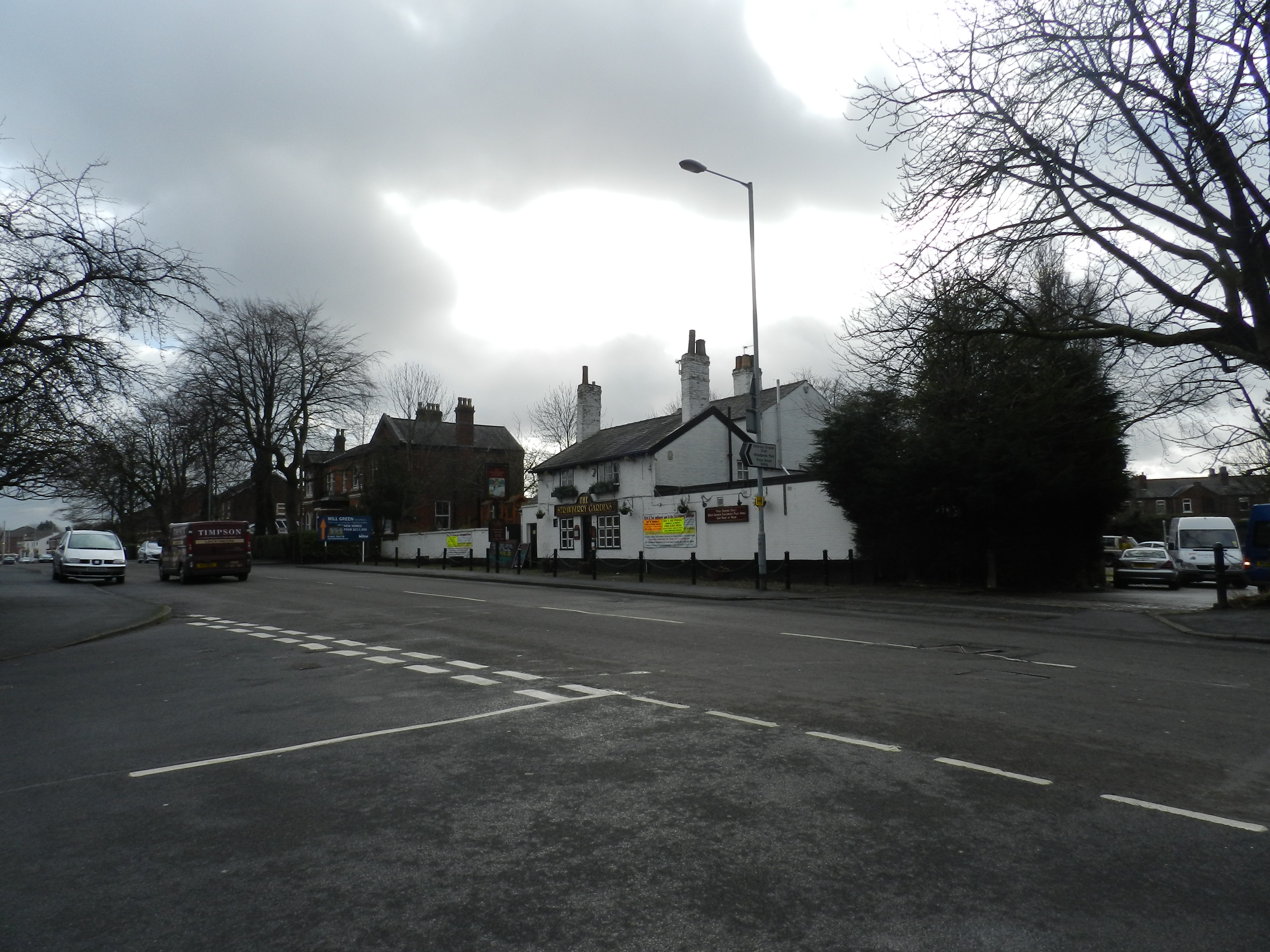
- The pub in 2013

- Location within Greater Manchester

General information
- Type: Public house
- Location: 84 Offerton Lane, Offerton, Greater Manchester, England
- Coordinates: 53.4023°N 2.1328°W
- Year built: Mid to late 18th century
- Renovated: 19th and 20th century (added)
- Owner: Heineken UK

Design and construction
- Designations

Listed Building – Grade II
- Official name: The Strawberry Gardens public house
- Designated: 10 March 1975
- Reference no.: 1260003

The Strawberry Gardens is a Grade II listed public house on Offerton Lane in Offerton, a suburb of Stockport, Greater Manchester, England. Built in the mid to late 18th century, it has later additions, including a 19th‑century extension at the rear and two 20th‑century additions to either side. The property includes a large garden that may have been a former bowling green, and its freehold was owned by Heineken UK as of 2021.

== History ==
The building was constructed in the mid to late 18th century, according to its official listing, and later gained a rear extension dating from the 19th century and two side additions from the 20th century. The 1895 and 1938 Ordnance Survey maps show the building without attributing a name or designation.

On 10 March 1975, the Strawberry Gardens was designated a Grade II listed building. The property includes a large garden that may have been a bowling green in the past. As of 2021, the pub's freehold is owned by Heineken UK.

== Architecture ==
The building is constructed of painted brick with a slate roof. It has two storeys and two bays, with a central doorway and later additions: one from the 19th century at the back and two from the 20th century on either side. The entrance has a small window above the door. The ground floor has casement windows divided into two and three parts, set under flat brick heads, and the upper floor has similar two and three‑part windows.

The roof has overhanging eaves supported by paired brackets, and there are two tall chimneys on the gable ends. The 20th‑century additions are single‑storey, with a flat roof on the right and a pitched roof on the left.

The interior has been significantly altered but still includes a central entrance area with small rooms to each side.

== See also ==
- Listed buildings in Stockport
- Listed pubs in Greater Manchester
