= St Peter's Church, Stockport =

Church in Stockport, Greater Manchester, England

St Peter's Church
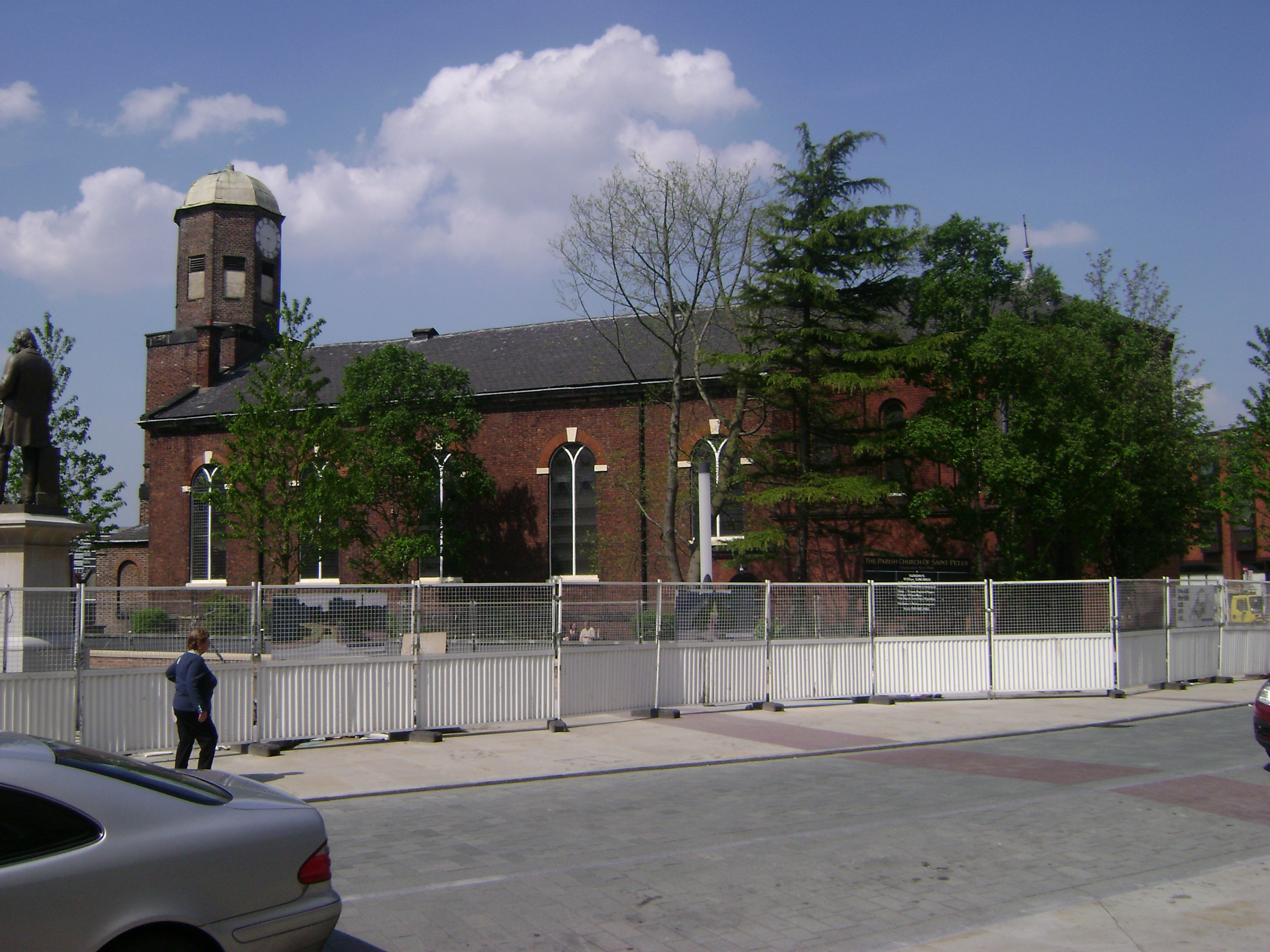
- St Peter's Church, from the southeast, 2008
- St Peter's Church
- 53.4105°N 2.1587°W
- Location: Stockport, Greater Manchester
- Country: England
- Denomination: Anglican
- Churchmanship: Anglo-Catholic (Forward in Faith)
- Website: stpetersstockport.org.uk

History
- Status: Parish church
- Dedication: St Peter

Architecture
- Functional status: Active
- Architectural type: Church
- Style: Georgian
- Completed: 1888

Specifications
- Materials: Brick

Administration
- Province: York
- Diocese: Chester
- Archdeaconry: Macclesfield
- Deanery: Stockport
- Parish: St Peter, Stockport

Clergy
- Rector: Living currently suspended
- Priest

Listed Building – Grade II
- Official name: Parish Church of St Peter
- Designated: 13 May 1952
- Reference no.: 1067159

St Peter's Church is the second-oldest parish church in the town of Stockport, Greater Manchester, England. The church stands in St Peter's Square (grid reference SJ894904) and is recorded in the National Heritage List for England (NHLE) as a designated Grade II listed building. It is an active Anglican parish church in the Diocese of Chester, the archdeaconry of Macclesfield and the deanery of Stockport. Its benefice was combined with that of St Thomas, Stockport until 30 April 2012.

== History ==
The church was built in 1768 at the sole cost of William Wright. A gallery was added in 1838 and an apse in 1888–1889.

== Current parish life and services ==
St Peter's is an Anglican church that was swept up in the Oxford Movement of the 19th century. This tradition is maintained with sung mass with Angelus taking place on Sundays at 10.30am and said mass on Fridays at 12.30pm. It is a Forward in Faith parish under the alternative episcopal oversight of Glyn Webster, the Bishop of Beverley.

At the centre of Stockport, it provides a space for quiet and reflection, being open, along with its café and shop, Tuesday and Friday from 11am to 2pm. Every second Saturday of the month, there is a coffee morning and organ recital from 10.00am to 1pm.

== Architecture ==
=== Structure ===
The church is built in brick with a west tower, nave and chancel. The tower is in three stages with a west door above which is a round-headed window. The top, belfry, stage is octagonal. The nave windows are also round-headed.

=== Fittings and furniture ===
The interior of the church is light and spacious. At the west end is a gallery. The front of the church is panelled and has a coloured shield of arms depicting the cross keys of St Peter. Under the gallery is a white marble font. On the north wall of the chancel are three marble mural tablets which are to the memory of William Wright, the founder, and to two of the early vicars of the church. Also in the church is a hatchment from the 18th or early 19th century to a member of the Wright family. There is one bell dated 1768. The communion plate includes a chalice and a paten dating from 1768.

The church nave contains the 1769 chair frame clock formerly in the bell tower, now restored to working order by Philip Quale and Alan Newton. It is claimed that this is the oldest working public clock in Greater Manchester. It was installed just after the church opened in 1769 and was made by John Whitehurst (1713–1788) of Derby. (Leaflet alongside clock in the church 2008).

The church has a fine set of Festive High Mass clerical vestments from about 1890 said to be made of Portuguese tapestry comprising a tunical, a chasuble and a dalmatic. (Leaflet in the church 2008).

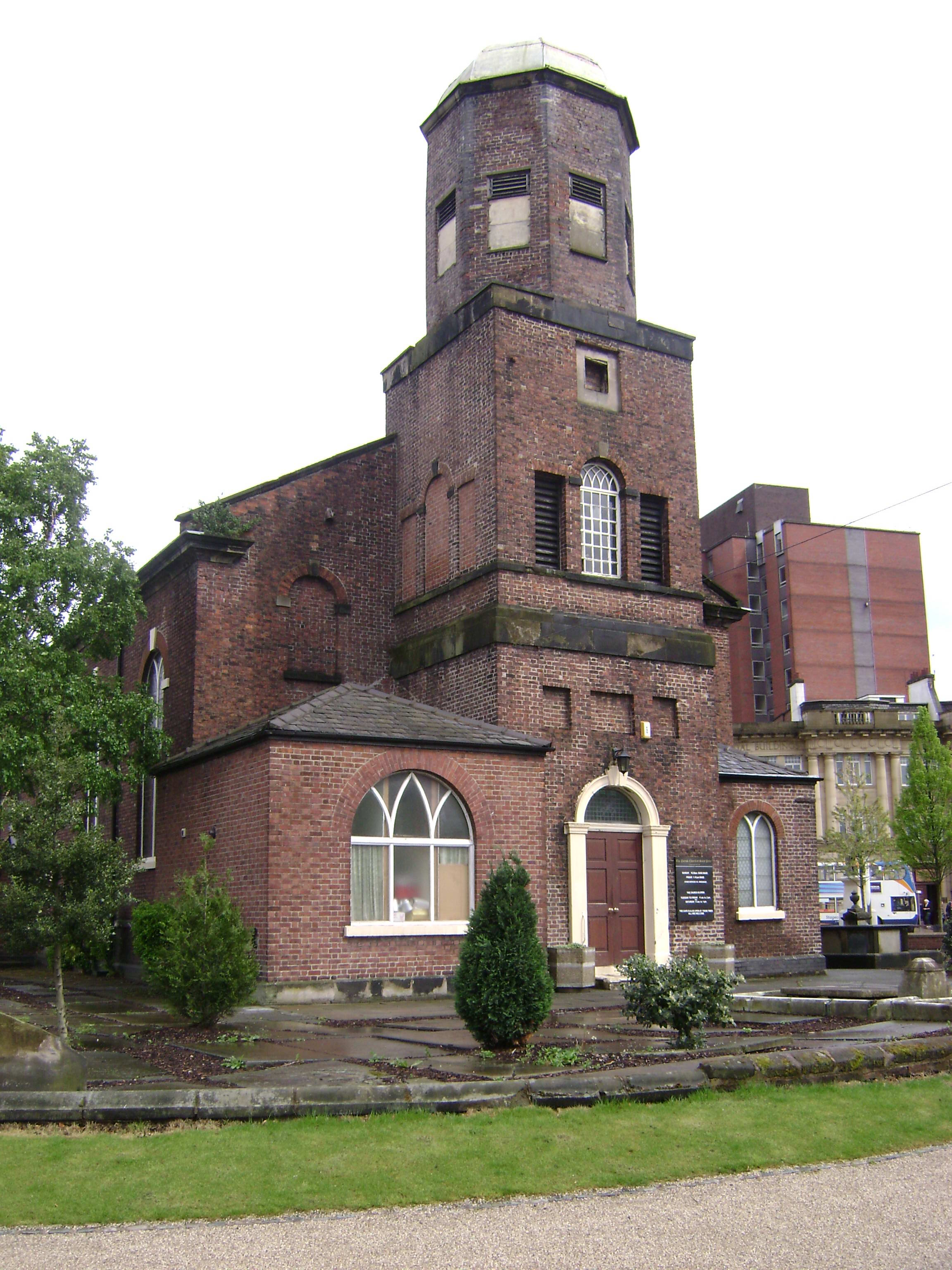
St. Peter's Church, Stockport, 2009

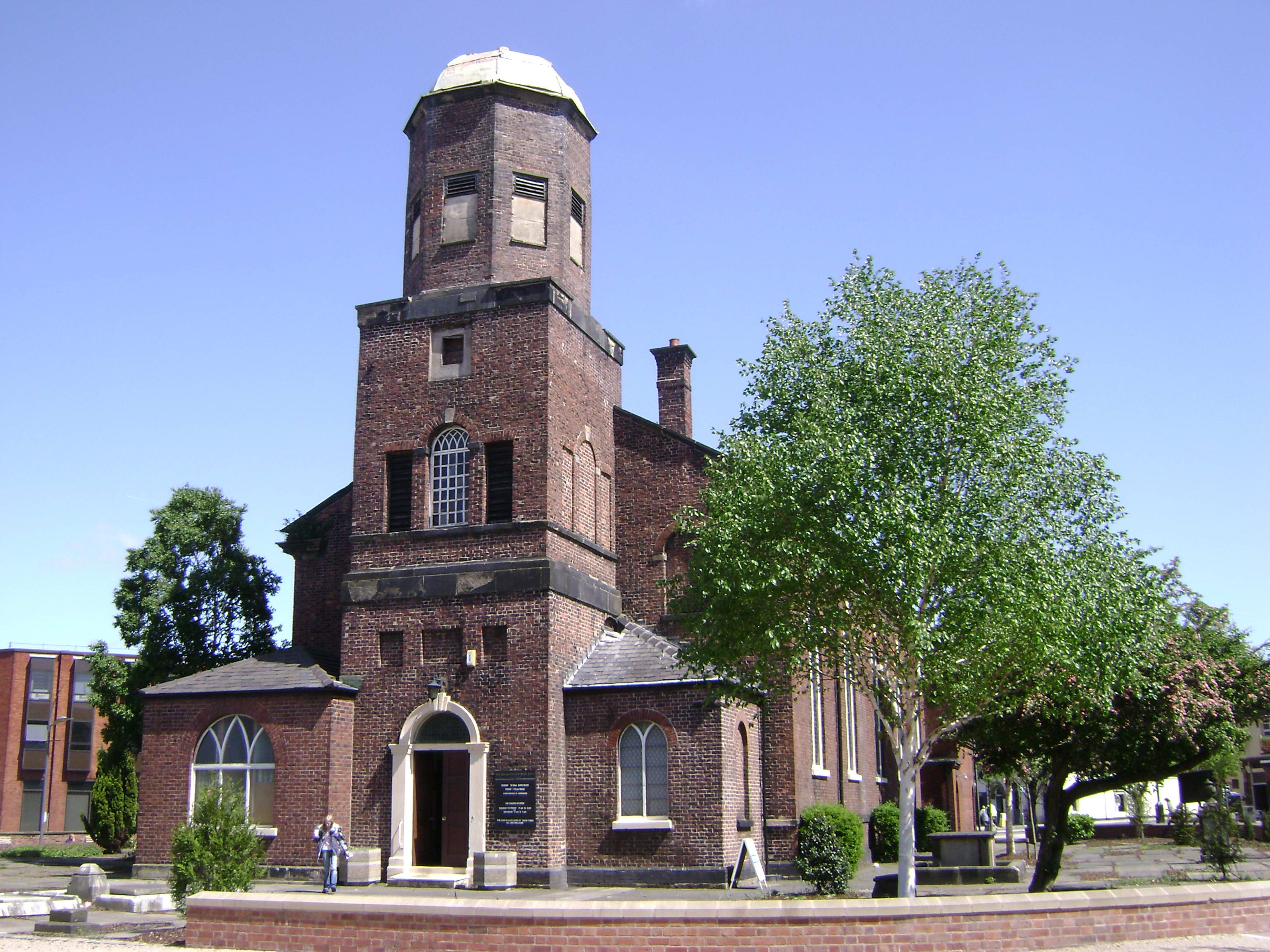
St. Peter's Church, Stockport, 2009

== See also ==
- List of churches in Greater Manchester
- Listed buildings in Stockport
