= New Hall Inn =

Pub in Cumbria, England

Coordinates: 54.3649°N 2.9209°W

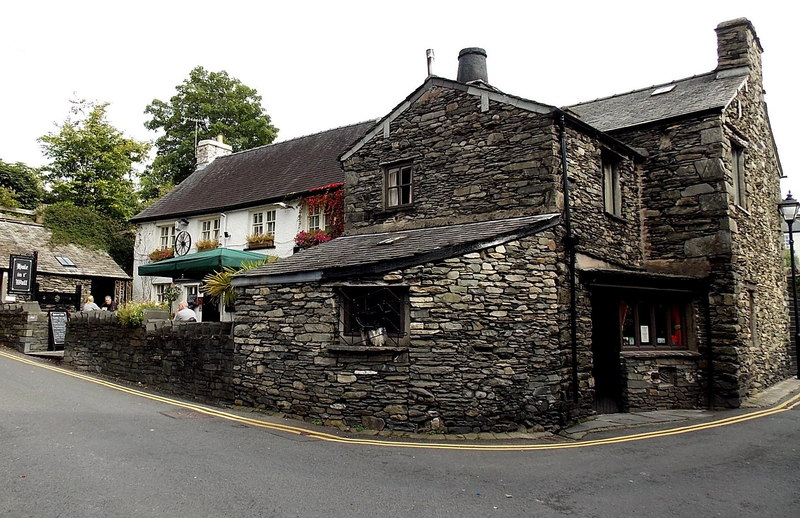
The New Hall Inn, 2013

The New Hall Inn, also known as the Hole in t'Wall, is the oldest public house in Bowness-on-Windermere, and is a Grade II listed building.

== History ==
The building, located on Lowside, Bowness, dates from around 1650.

Thomas Longmire, a noted wrestler of his era, was landlord of the inn between 1852 and 1862.

The New Hall Inn gained its pub licence in 1866.

The New Hall Inn was acquired by John Booth of the Old Brewery, Ulverston, in 1880, and numerous changes to the pub were made.

The pub was one of the largest in Bowness by 1890, by which time it was known locally as the "Hole in the Wall", or "Hole in t'Wall" in regional dialect. The origin of the name is not entirely certain; there may have been in a literal hole in the wall of the building to pass drinks to the neighbouring blacksmith and ostlers.

The Old Brewery was acquired by Robert and Peter Hartley in 1896.

The inn was the oldest licensed house in Bowness by 1907, and appealed to a working class clientele, particularly boatmen.

A 1931 account describes the pub as a place where dominoes and darts could be played, and where mild beer was served.

The building gained its Grade II listing in 1973.

Robinsons Brewery acquired the pub in 1982.
