= Bakers Vaults =

Listed pub in Stockport, Greater Manchester, England

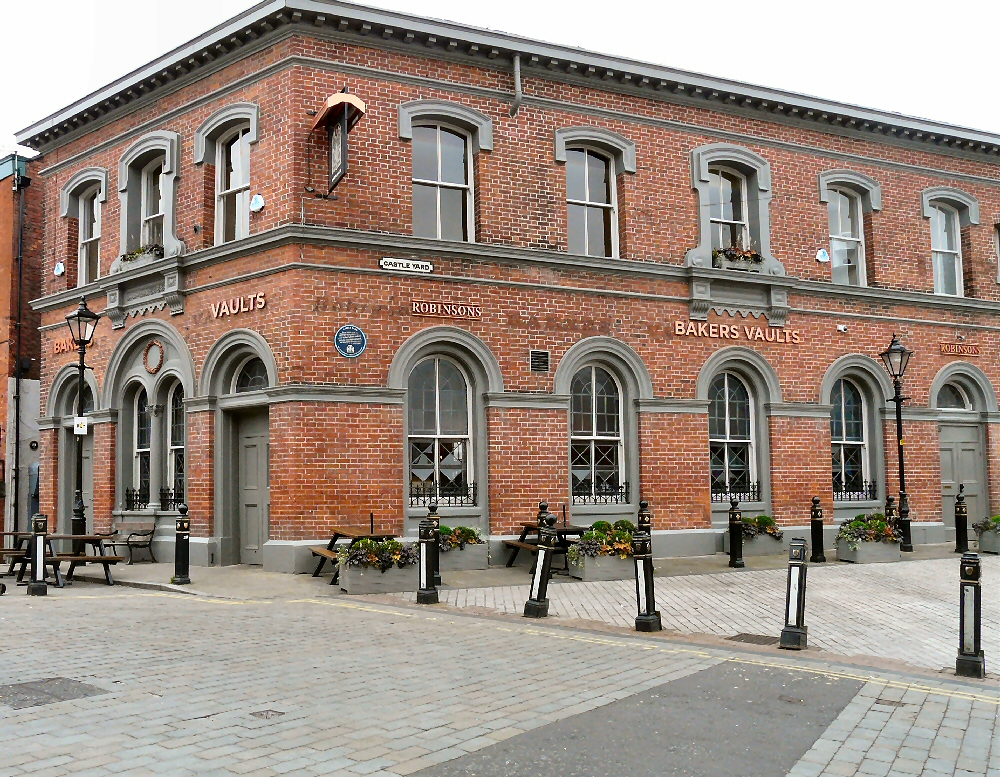
- The pub in 2014

- Location within Greater Manchester

General information
- Type: Public house
- Location: Market Place, Stockport, Greater Manchester, England
- Coordinates: 53.4118°N 2.1572°W
- Year built: Late 19th century
- Renovated: 2014 (refurbished)
- Owner: Robinsons

Design and construction
- Designations

Listed Building – Grade II
- Official name: Bakers Vaults public house
- Designated: 10 March 1975
- Reference no.: 1067183

Website
- Official website

Bakers Vaults is a Grade II listed public house on Market Place in Stockport, Greater Manchester, England. Built in the late 19th century, it stands on the site of the former George and Dragon inn, which dated from around 1775 and occupied the surviving foundations of Stockport Castle. The pub became part of the Robinsons Brewery estate in 1929 and underwent a major refurbishment in 2014.

== History ==
The building was constructed on Market Place in the late 19th century, according to its official listing. It stands on the site of the George and Dragon, an inn dating from around 1775 that was built on the surviving foundations of Stockport Castle and demolished in the late 19th century.

The 1898 Ordnance Survey map marks the building as an inn without attributing a name, while the 1922 and 1936 editions record it as a public house. In 1929 it became part of the Robinsons Brewery estate, following the acquisition of Kays Atlas Brewery.

On 10 March 1975, Bakers Vaults was designated a Grade II listed building. It forms a group with the Grade II-listed Farm Produce Hall and 25 Market Place. In mid‑2014 the building was extensively refurbished by Jonny Booth, Jamie Langrish and Rupert Hill, operators of several pubs in Manchester and Salford, including the Castle Hotel and the Eagle Inn.

== Architecture ==
=== Exterior ===
The building is constructed in brick in Flemish bond and rises to two storeys, with a roof that slopes evenly on all sides and projects slightly beyond the walls on a decorative cornice. The upper level is arranged with three windows, each given a shaped finish in plaster, while the central window is set within a more pronounced surround and has a small moulded panel supported on brackets beneath it. On the ground floor, two arched doorways stand to either side of a two‑part arched window. This window sits within a larger arched recess and includes a laurel‑wreath motif as part of its decoration. A decorative iron guard is fixed across the window.

The right‑hand side follows the same general treatment, with five windows on each floor and the lower ones set in shallow arches linked by a horizontal band. The left‑hand side is similar in appearance but includes a stone basement that becomes taller as the ground slopes away.

=== Interior ===
Inside, the building includes decorative plaster detailing around the arched openings and a circular cast‑iron radiator dating from the late 19th century. The interior reflects the late 19th‑century gin palace approach, with high ceilings and large arched windows giving the space a more open appearance. The bar is positioned towards the rear, and behind it is a smaller seating area. Beneath the building are deep cellars cut directly into the sandstone bedrock.

== See also ==
- Listed buildings in Stockport
- Listed pubs in Greater Manchester
