= Queen's Head, Stockport =

Listed former pub in Stockport, England

Queen's Head
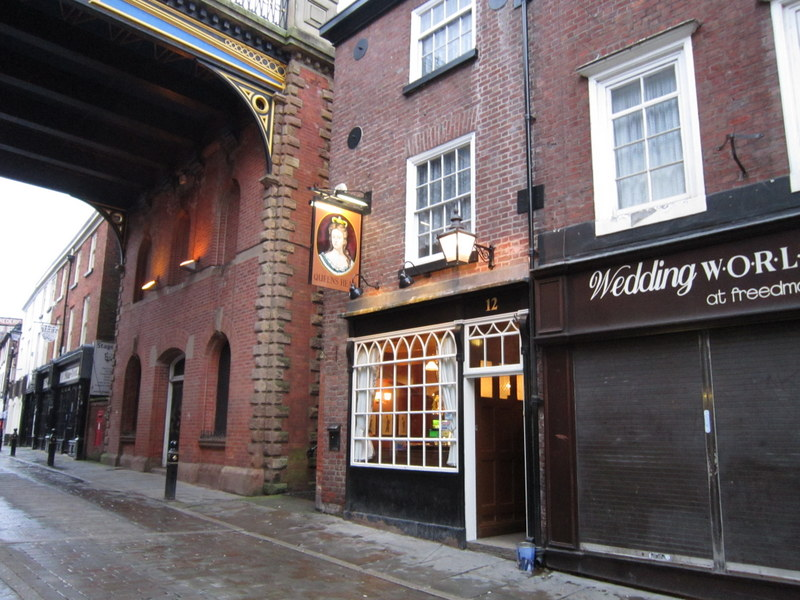
- The pub in 2012, before its closure in 2023

- Location within Greater Manchester
- Alternative names: Turner's Vaults

General information
- Status: Vacant
- Type: Public house (former)
- Location: 12 Little Underbank, Underbank, Stockport, Greater Manchester, England
- Coordinates: 53.4109°N 2.1576°W
- Year built: Late 18th or early 19th century
- Renovated: c. 1930, 1990 (remodelled); 2025 (roof repaired)
- Closed: 2023 (as a pub)
- Owner: Samuel Smith's

Design and construction
- Designations

Listed Building – Grade II
- Official name: 10–12 Little Underbank
- Designated: 10 March 1975
- Reference no.: 1067179

The Queen's Head (included within the Grade II listing for 10–12 Little Underbank and occupying No. 12) is a former public house in the Underbank area of Stockport, Greater Manchester, England. The building dates from the late 18th or early 19th century and has been altered several times, including the relocation of the pub to No. 12 in the 1860s and internal remodelling around 1930 and in 1990. It closed in 2023 as Samuel Smith's was seeking a new tenant, and as of November 2026 no update on its future has been published.

== History ==
10–12 Little Underbank was constructed in the late 18th or early 19th century, according to its official listing. In 1830 a separate property at 13 Little Underbank was built as a distillery, which explains its shared cellar with the Queen's Head at No. 12. In 1849 No. 12 was attached on its eastern side to a larger property called the Queen's Head public house. When that neighbouring building was cleared to make way for St Petersgate Bridge built between 1866 and 1868, the pub appears to have relocated to No. 12. The 1898 and 1936 Ordnance Survey maps show the building without a name or designation.

Around 1930 the pub was altered to form the current three‑room arrangement. The pub was also known as Turner's Vaults, although the period during which this name was used has not been recorded.

On 10 March 1975, the Queen's Head was included in the Grade II listing for 10–12 Little Underbank. The building forms a group with the Grade II-listed St Petersgate Bridge and 16–26 Little Underbank.

In the 1990s, the freehold owner Samuel Smith's removed the corridor to enlarge the bar and installed new fittings, resulting in a narrow front bar with alcoves, a central snug with a stove, and a larger room at the back. In May 2023, the Queen's Head closed as Samuel Smith's was seeking a new tenant, and in July 2025 the roof underwent repair work to ensure the building remained weather‑tight. As of November 2026, no further information has been published about the pub's status or future use.

== Architecture ==
=== Exterior ===
No. 12 (the Queen's Head) is constructed in brick and is of three storeys. At ground level it has a Gothic multi‑paned window and a matching rectangular fanlight above the doorway, which contains a six‑panel door. The first floor has a wide sash window, and the second floor has another sash of similar style but with fewer panes.

=== Interior ===
Inside, the rooms follow a long, narrow layout. The bar dates from later in the 19th century and still includes an original spirits dispenser. The main bar area is L‑shaped and has fixed seating. A timber partition at the back divides off a small snug on one side and a men's toilet on the other, with a stair nearby. Beyond this is a parlour with fixed seating and a top‑lit opening framed by decorative plasterwork.

== See also ==
- Listed buildings in Stockport
- Listed pubs in Greater Manchester
