= William Houldsworth =

British politician (1834–1917)

Sir William Henry Houldsworth Bt DL
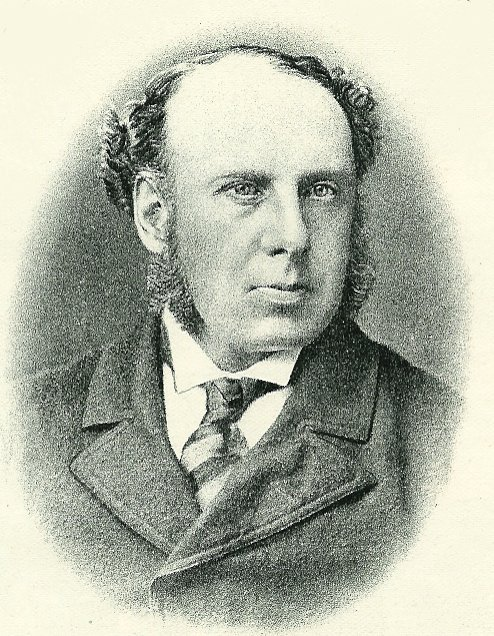
- Born: 20 August 1834; Ardwick, Manchester, England
- Died: 18 April 1917 (aged 82); Kilmarnock, Scotland
- Occupation: Mill owner
- Political party: Conservative
- Spouse: Elisabeth Graham Crum
- Children: 6

Sir William Henry Houldsworth, 1st Baronet DL (20 August 1834 – 18 April 1917), was a British mill owner based in Reddish, Lancashire. He served as Conservative MP for Manchester North West from 1883 to 1906 and was at one time chairman of the Fine Cotton Spinners' Association. He was created a baronet in 1887.

== Life ==
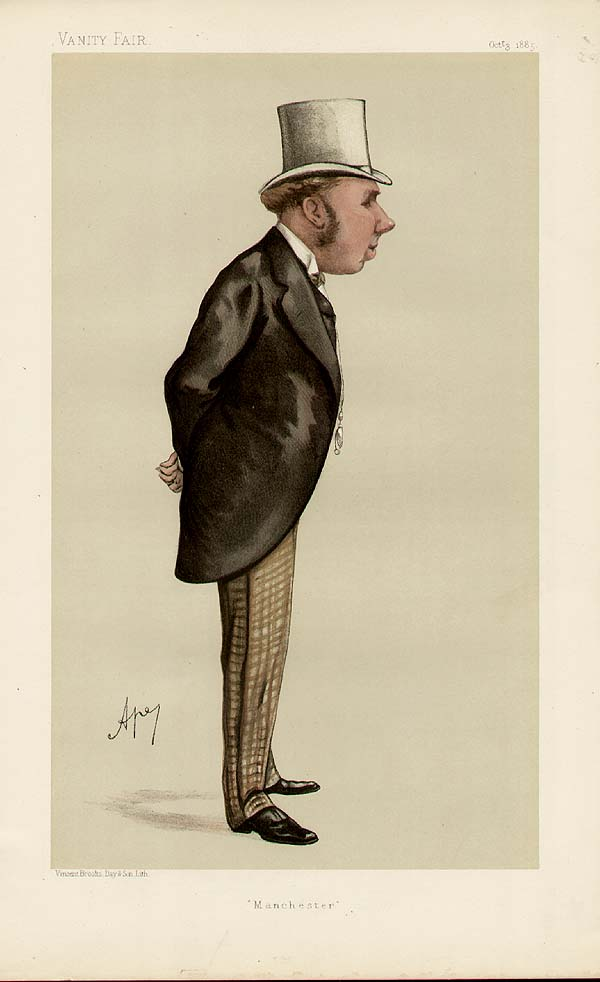
Houldsworth caricatured by Ape in Vanity Fair, 1885

William Henry Houldsworth was born on 20 August 1834, the fourth and youngest son of Henry Houldworth (1797–1868) and Helen Hamilton. His mother died while he was very young; although her exact date of death is unknown, his father remarried in 1838. In the 1860s, Houldsworth purchased farmland by the Stockport Branch Canal in Reddish and built Reddish Mill, then the largest cotton-spinning mill in the world (construction began in 1863 and was completed in 1865). Four members of the Houldsworth family held a 60% share in the Reddish Spinning Company Limited, which built the North Mill (started in 1870) and the Middle Mill (started in 1874). An institute—now Houldsworth Working Men's Club—was completed in 1874. All of these buildings were designed by architect Abraham Stott. Houldsworth later commissioned Alfred Waterhouse to design St Elisabeth's Church, its rectory, and Houldsworth School. All of these buildings remain standing today.

The beginnings of a model village, known as Houldsworth Model Village, were also laid out, with a variety of houses constructed in front of the mill. Some of these houses have since been demolished, but those on Houldsworth Street and Liverpool Street remain.

He was created a baronet in 1887 as Sir William Henry Houldsworth, of Reddish, in the Parish of Manchester, in the County Palatine of Lancaster, and of Coodham in the Parish of Symington in the County of Ayr.

The City of Manchester made him a freeman in 1905, and the Victoria University of Manchester awarded him an honorary LLD. In later life, Houldsworth moved away from Reddish and Manchester and focused on his estate at Coodham, Ayrshire, in Scotland, where he built a domestic chapel designed by Waterhouse.

== Legacy ==
Several features in Reddish are named after Houldsworth. A drinking fountain and four-faced clock, funded by public subscription, were unveiled in Houldsworth Square on 11 September 1920.

The oldest block of Hulme Hall—a hall of residence for the University of Manchester, which was largely funded in its early years during the 1870s by Houldsworth—is also named after him.

== Family ==
On 20 August 1862 in Thornliebank, Houldsworth married Elisabeth Graham Crum, daughter of Walter Crum.

== Sport ==
He was a keen golfer and along with the Hon A.J. Balfour (Prime Minister from 1902–05) played an instrumental role in establishing the Balfour and Houldsworth Golf Challenge Cups. Still contested more than 125 years later, these two premier trophies—the Balfour Cup and the Houldsworth Trophy—are notable examples of Victorian craftsmanship.

== Notes ==
Parliament of the United Kingdom
Preceded by Hugh Birley; Jacob Bright; John Slagg	Member of Parliament for Manchester; 1883–1885; With: Jacob Bright 1883–1885; John Slagg 1883–1885	Constituency abolished
New constituency	Member of Parliament for Manchester North-West; 1885–1906	Succeeded by Winston Churchill
Baronetage of the United Kingdom
New creation	Baronet (of Reddish); 1887–1917	Succeeded by Henry Hamilton Houldsworth
Professional and academic associations
Preceded by Alfred William Flux	President of the Manchester Statistical Society; 1901–03	Succeeded by Frederick Merttens
