= St Elisabeth's Church, Reddish =

Church in Stockport, Greater Manchester, England

Coordinates: 53.437972°N 2.163303°W

St. Elisabeth's Church
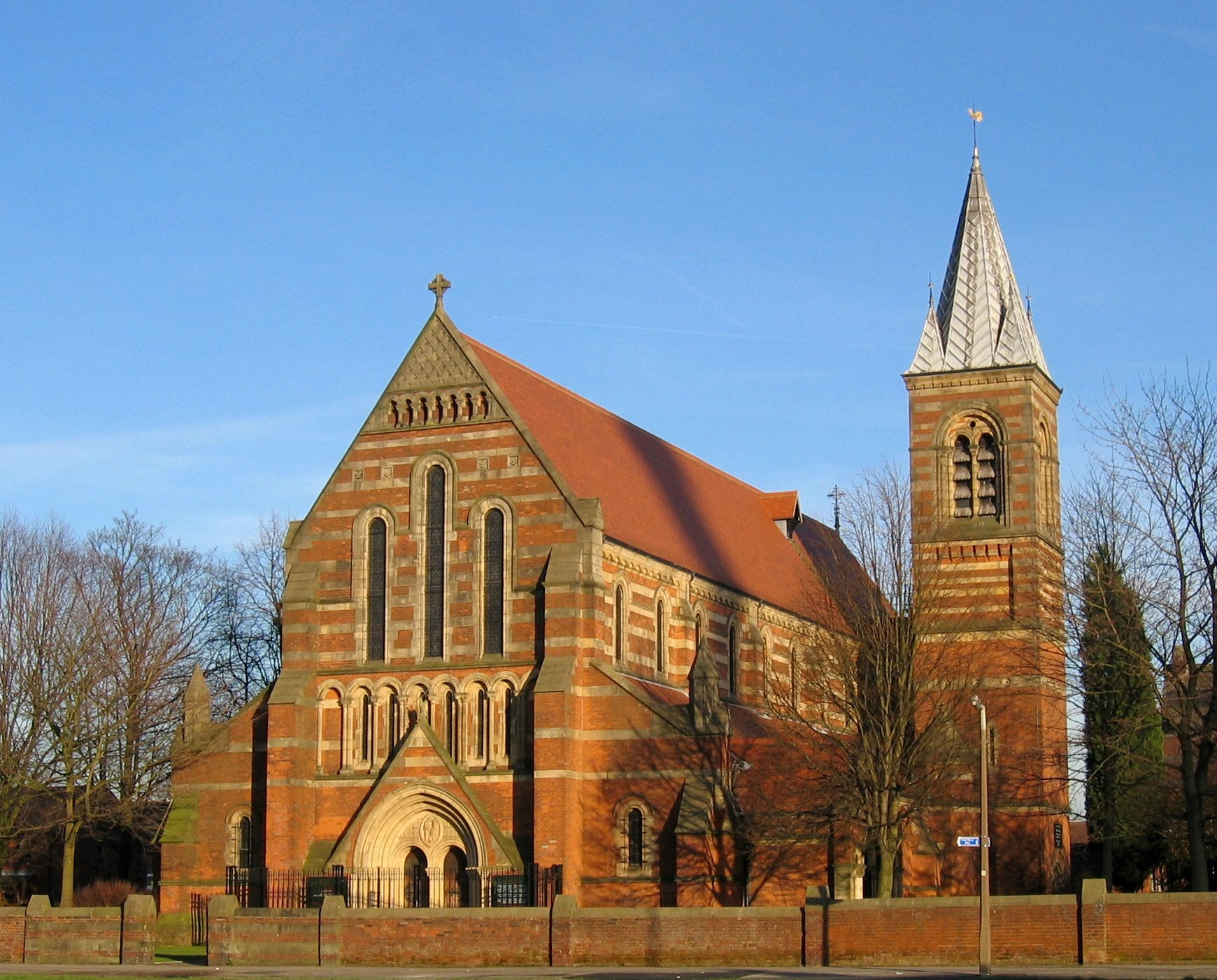
- St. Elisabeth's Church
- Denomination: Church of England
- Churchmanship: Anglo-Catholic
- Website: www.saintelisabeths.com

History
- Dedication: St. Elisabeth

Architecture
- Heritage designation: Grade I listed building
- Designated: 30 October 1973

Administration
- Province: York
- Diocese: Manchester

Clergy
- Priest: Rev Amy Cornell

St. Elisabeth's Church is an Anglo Catholic church in Reddish, an area in the Metropolitan Borough of Stockport, Greater Manchester, England, designed by Alfred Waterhouse in the Victorian Gothic style. It is a grade I listed building.

== Architecture ==
Local mill-owner Sir William Houldsworth commissioned Alfred Waterhouse in the 1870s. Construction took place between 1881 and 1883, paid for entirely by Houldsworth, with consecration on 4 August 1883 by Bishop James Fraser. The church could hold 750 people and was named after Houldsworth's wife. Described by Pevsner as "a superb job, big-boned, with nothing mean outside or in", the church is of Openshaw brick with Wrexham stone dressings. An almost separate belltower contains eight bells cast by Taylor. Six of the bells were dedicated by Bishop Francis Cramer-Roberts on May Day 1897.

Pillars supporting the nave's roof were transported from the nearby canal to the site on the backs of elephants from Belle Vue Zoo. There is a marble screen with four figures on top, possibly the four evangelists, Matthew, Mark, Luke and John.

The strikingly modern Stations of the Cross, by Graeme Willson, were commissioned in 1983, and include local views such as Stockport Viaduct, and Pendlebury Hall on Lancashire Hill, Stockport.

== Religion ==
St. Elisabeth's is an Anglo-Catholic church, i.e. high church within the Church of England, reflecting Houldsworth's own beliefs. There are several services each week, the main Sung Mass being at 10:30 on Sunday.

The first incumbent was Rev Addison Crofton, succeeded by Rev Edmund Oldfield in 1893.

== Music ==
The organ was originally built by William Hill & Son of London. It was ordered in 1882 (as Job No. 1854) but was not completed until 1885. It had three manuals and pedals, with tubular pneumatic action linking the detached console on the south side of the choir stalls to the organ on the north side of the chancel, in an elevated position in the Triforium. It was rebuilt by Wadsworth Brothers of Manchester in 1929. During the late 1960s it was disastrously rebuilt by a small, local firm Charles H Smethurst Ltd, to a much reduced specification. The original specification of the organ can be found on the National Pipe Organ Register: but note a more recent rebuild and enlargement (2017) by F H Browne, Canterbury, making use of some of the stored pipework from the earlier 'disastrous' rebuild mentioned above. The organ is restored to 30 speaking stops and some significantly good ranks have been re-introduced.

== Rectory ==
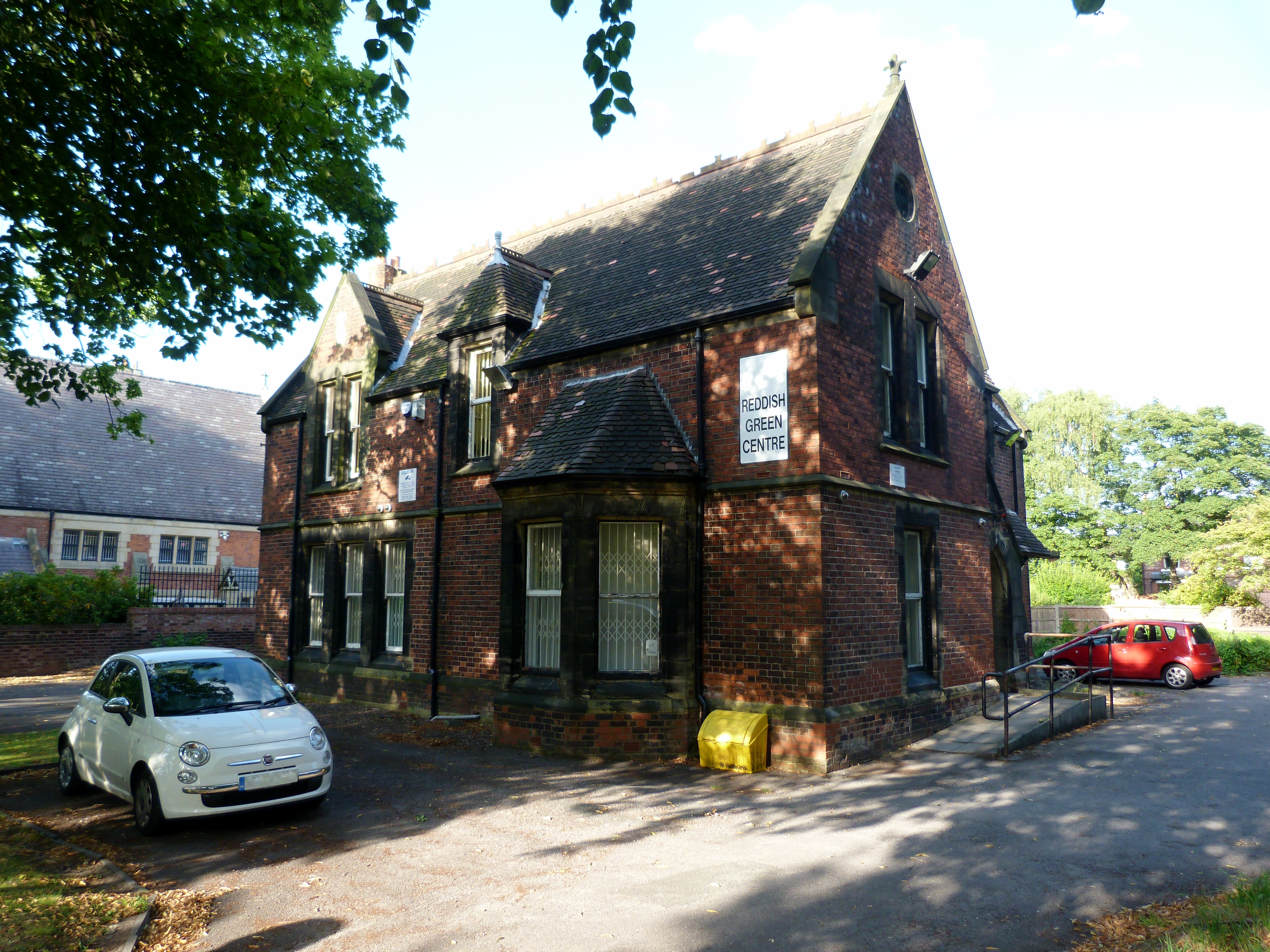
The former rectory is a grade II* listed building

A rectory, also designed by Alfred Waterhouse, was built for the church in 1874. It, and the walls the south and west of the church, are all grade II* listed buildings.

== In popular culture ==
St Elisabeth's was used as a set for the wedding of Ashley Peacock and Maxine Heavey in the TV soap opera Coronation Street. The church also featured as the setting for the BBC children's drama Clay broadcast on CBBC. Extensive modifications to the vestry and interior of the church were required to change it into a Catholic church in 1960s Tyneside. It was based on the novel Clay by David Almond and starred Imelda Staunton.

== See also ==
- Grade I listed churches in Greater Manchester
- Listed buildings in Stockport
- List of churches in Greater Manchester
- List of ecclesiastical works by Alfred Waterhouse
