= Robinsons Brewery =

Regional brewery in Stockport, England

Frederic Robinson Ltd
- Industry: Brewing
- Founded: 1849; 177 years ago
- Founder: Frederic Robinson
- Headquarters: Stockport, Greater Manchester, England
- Products: Beer and spirits
- Production output: 35,000 barrels
- Owner: Frederic Robinson Ltd
- Website: robinsonsbrewery.com

Robinsons Brewery is a family-run, regional brewery, founded in 1849 at the Unicorn Inn in Stockport, Cheshire, England.

The company owns around 250 pubs, mostly in North West England.

== History ==
William Robinson purchased the Unicorn Inn from Samuel Hole on 29 September 1838. His eldest son George brewed the first Robinsons Ale there in 1849.

In 1859, Frederic Robinson took over from George and bought a warehouse to the rear of the inn to expand brewing capacity. As a result, Robinsons ale became available at pubs around the Stockport area. To control the quality of ale sold, Frederic began to purchase public houses. From 1878 until his death in 1890, Frederic established twelve pubs which exclusively served his ale. This was the beginning of what was to become an estate of over 300 pubs across the North West of England and North Wales.

The Unicorn Brewery still rests on the foundations of the public house on Lower Hillgate in Stockport.

The brewery continues to be run by the fifth and sixth generations of the Robinson family. The company took over Hartley's Brewery in Ulverston, Cumbria in 1982, closing it and transferring the brewing of Hartley's beers to Stockport in 1991. Robinsons have acquired a number of other breweries over the years, including John Heginbotham, Stalybridge (1915); T. Schofield & Son, Ashton-under-Lyne (1926); Kays Atlas Brewery, Ardwick (1929) and Bell & Co, Stockport (1949).

The brewery owns many historic pubs, including the New Hall Inn in Bowness-on-Windermere, Cumbria, the Holly Bush in Bollington, Cheshire, and the Royal Oak Hotel in Garstang, Lancashire.

== Distribution ==
The brewery supplies its own estate of just over 300 public houses, mostly in North West England, but including more than 30 in North Wales. It also sells to the free trade. In addition, the company provides casking, kegging and bottling services to other brewers from their site at Bredbury, a short distance from the main Unicorn Brewery.

== Brewery ==
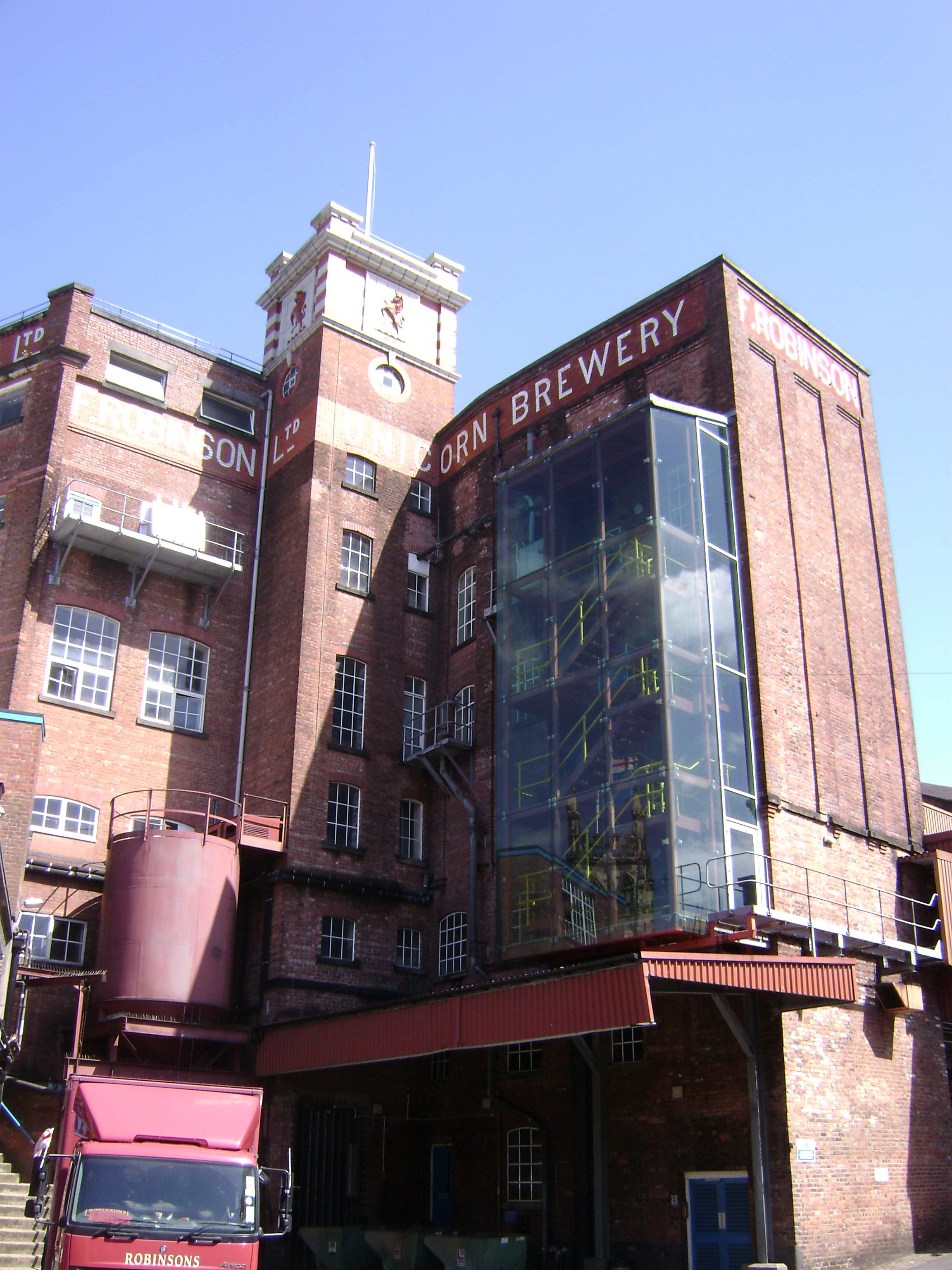
Unicorn Brewery

The Unicorn Brewery is a traditional tower type and was one of the few such buildings still being used in its original capacity until production moved to Bredbury in 2024.

== Beers ==
- Unicorn (4.2% ABV)

A bitter available on draught or bottled.

- Hartleys Cumbria Way (4.1% ABV)

Brewed since 2001, this bitter takes its name from the Cumbria Way long-distance footpath linking the towns of Ulverston and Carlisle.

- Hartley's XB (4.0% ABV)

A cask-conditioned bitter.

- Cwrw'r ddraig aur (4.1% ABV)

Golden Dragon Ale, a bitter brewed for Robinsons' Welsh pubs.

- Old Tom (8.5% ABV)

A strong ale that has been brewed since 1899. Available bottled or on draught. Chocolate Tom and Ginger Tom are also available in bottle (6% ABV).

- Dizzy Blonde (3.8% ABV)

A golden ale that has been available, following its stint as a seasonal ale, since 2012. Available bottled or on draught.

- Double Hop (4.8% ABV)

An India pale ale (IPA).

- Unicorn Black (4.1% ABV)

A bottled stout inspired by a 19th-century recipe.

- Trooper (4.7% ABV)

A premium bitter brewed since May 2013 to a recipe created by Bruce Dickinson, the lead vocalist of the heavy metal band Iron Maiden.

- Trooper Red 'N' Black Porter (5.8% ABV)

A porter introduced in September 2016, available on draught (cask and keg) and bottled (6.8% ABV).

- Trooper Hallowed (6.0% ABV)

A limited-edition Belgian-style beer introduced in July 2017, available in bottle.

- Wizard (3.7% ABV)

An amber bitter first brewed in 2015.

== Seasonal ales ==
=== 2014 ===
- Hannibal's Nectar (3.9% ABV – Available through January and February)

A ruby bitter available on draught.

- Hoptimum Prime (4.1% ABV – Available through March and April)

A golden ale available on draught.

- Brazilian (4.2% ABV – Available through May and June)

A blonde ale available on draught.

- Citra Pale Ale (3.8% ABV – Available through July and August)

A crisp pale ale inspired by American craft beers, available on draught.

- South Island (4.2% ABV – Available through September and October)

A blonde ale brewed with New Zealand Nelson Sauvin hops and available on draught.

- Indulgence (4.4% ABV – Available through November and December)

A mahogany-coloured old ale available on draught.

=== 2015 ===
- Voodoo Dawn (3.9% ABV – Available through January and February)

A ruby bitter available on draught.

- Mojo (3.7% ABV – Available through March and April)

An amber ale, brewed with East Kent Goldings and First Gold hops, available on draught.

- Dizzy's Twisted Sister (4.0% ABV – Available through July and August)

A blonde ale available on draught.

- Hop & Under (4.2% ABV – Available through September and October)

A golden ale inspired by the Rugby World Cup, available on draught.

- Frosty Frolics (4.4% ABV – Available through November and December)

A mahogany-coloured ale for the festive season, available on draught.

== Gallery ==
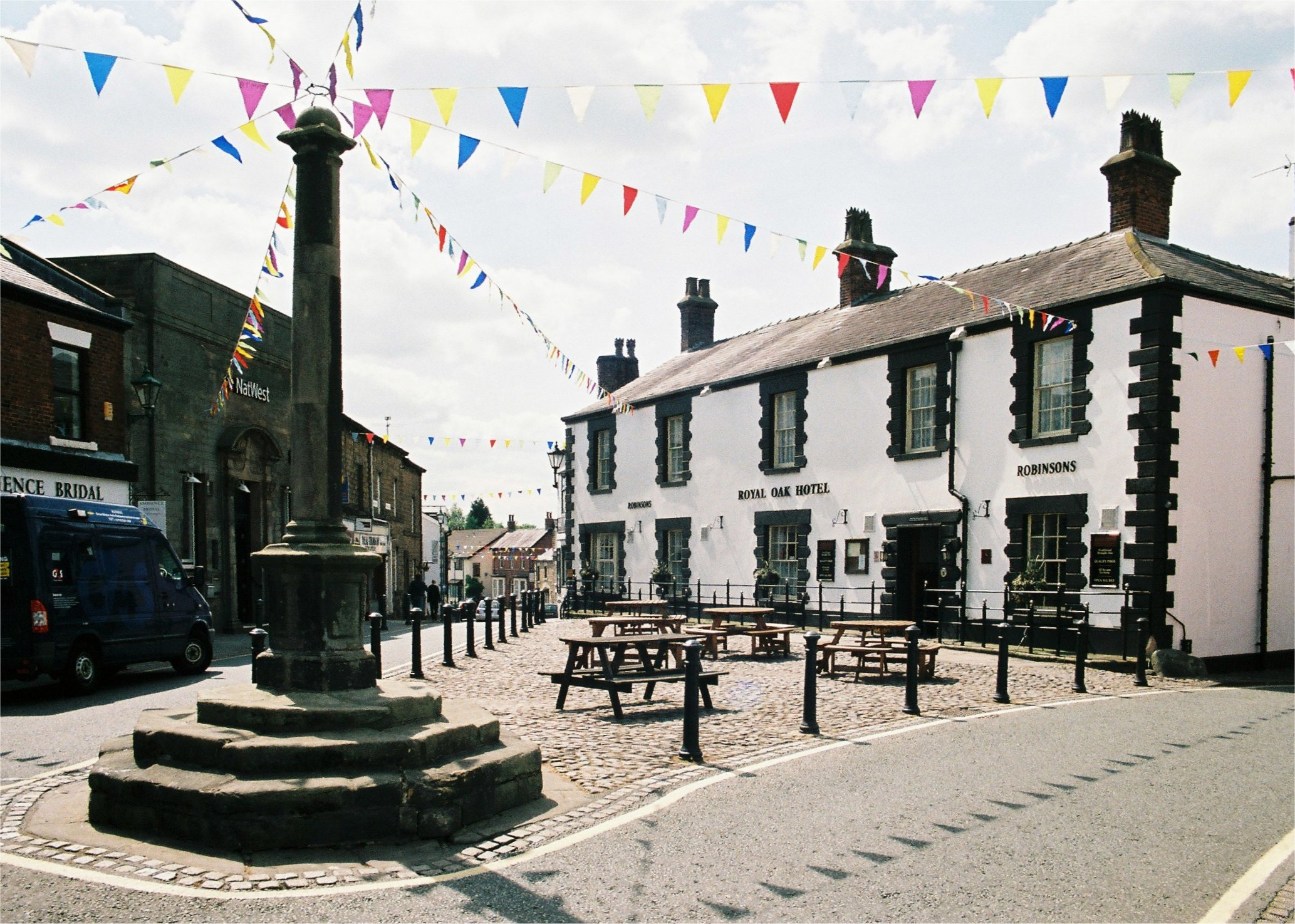
The Royal Oak Hotel in Garstang, Lancashire, with its brewery branding

== Bibliography ==
- Pearson, Lynn F. (1997). The History of Robinson's Brewery. Morrison Nicholson Cartwright. ISBN 978-0-9529461-0-6.
