= History of Reddish =

There is evidence of activity around Reddish – a settlement in Greater Manchester, England – before the Norman conquest in the presence of Nico Ditch and some Saxon coins. The recorded history of Reddish begins at the turn of the 13th century when it was documented as "Redich". Reddish remained a predominantly rural settlement throughout the medieval period, but expanded to become a mixed industrial and residential area during the 19th century. It developed rapidly during the Industrial Revolution, and still retains landmarks from that period, such as Houldsworth Mill.

== Geography and administration ==
Reddish borders Heaton Chapel and Brinnington in Stockport, Denton in Tameside, and Gorton and Levenshulme in the City of Manchester.

The extents have been well-defined for at least several hundred years. Reddish was a township in the ancient parish of Manchester, but it lay outside the manor of Manchester. This had the effect that boundaries of Reddish were described by the boundaries of the manor of Manchester, with the exception of that with Cheshire, which was the River Tame. The manor boundaries were surveyed and recorded in 1322, and the relevant part was:

following the said water [Tame] to the mid [stream] between the county of Chester and Assheton unto the Mereclowe at Redyshe so following Mereclowe unto Saltergate, from thence following the ditch of Redyshe unto Mikeldiche, following that unto Peyfyngate, following that unto Le Turrepittes between Heton Norreyes and Redishe, from thence following Le Merebroke unto the confluence of the waters of Tame and Mersey.

"Mere" means boundary in this context. The description was traced into early 20th century features by Crofton and can be cast as:

following the middle of the Tame as far as Denton Brook at Reddish; and so following Denton Brook and a tributary as far as Thornley Lane South; and then following Thornley Lane as far as Nico Ditch; and following Nelstrop Road as far as the turf-pits between Heaton Norris and Reddish (these are lost); and from there following Black Brook as far as near the conjunction of the waters of the Tame and Goyt.

However, Black Brook cannot be le Merebroke as it does not flow to the Tame, but joins Cringle Brook, which flows into the Mersey several miles away via Chorlton Brook. With this exception, Crofton's interpretation of the 1322 boundaries matches those shown on Ordnance Survey maps of the 19th century.

Administratively, Reddish became an urban district in 1894. By 1901 the neighbouring County Borough of Stockport had effectively run out of land, and was overflowing into abutting districts. In 1901, after petitioning the Local Government Board, Stockport expanded into several areas including the whole of Reddish, described by Arrowsmith as Stockport's "greatest prize". Stockport gained Reddish's tax income and building land, and in return Reddish received several civic amenities. A council school opened in 1907, and a combined fire station, free library, and baths opened in stages during 1908 (Cronin identifies a small building at the rear as a mortuary). The council opened new municipal parks at Mid Reddish (on land presented by Houldsworth) and at South Reddish. A park at North Reddish followed, described in 1932 as "recently laid out, provid(ing) a number of horticultural features combined with recreation facilities, and illustrat(ing) the layout of a modern recreation park". At that time, the Stockport Canal and the Reddish Iron Works made up two of the park's boundaries.

The separate civil parish was merged into Stockport parish in 1935. Reddish's position north of the Tame means it was historically part of Lancashire. On the merger with Stockport in 1901 the boundary between Lancashire and Cheshire was moved to place it in Cheshire. In 1974 Stockport and several adjacent territories became a unified metropolitan borough in the newly created metropolitan county of Greater Manchester.

== History ==
=== Toponymy ===
Reddish is recorded as Redich (1205, 1212), Redych, Radich (1226), Radish, Rediche (1262), Redditch (1381), Redwyche, Radishe and Reddishe (16th century). The name either means "reedy ditch" (OE hrēod-dīc) or "red ditch" (OE rēad-dīc). Ekwall (1922) allows either form, stating "red" is less probable; Mills (1991) and Arrowsmith (1997) only give the "reed" option. The ditch referred to is possibly the Nico Ditch, an earthwork of uncertain origin bordering Reddish, Manchester and Denton. Folklore has it that the names Gorton and Reddish arose from a battle between Saxons and Danes. John Higson wrote in 1852

The neigh'ring trench is called the Nicker Ditch
Flowing with blood, it did the name convey
To th' bordering hamlet, Red-Ditch. Near here, Where
the last 'tween the foes was fought,
Where victory was won, that memorable
Eminence proudly was distinguished
By the name of Winning Hill. The streamlet
Aforemention'd gains appellation
Of Gore Brook, also the contiguous
Happy hamlet through which it floweth still
Bears, in glorious commemoration,
And e'er shall, the honour'd name of Gore Town.

Farrer and Brownbill dismiss this interpretation as "popular fancy".

=== Pre-Norman Conquest ===
Reddish is not rich in history. Nico (or Nicker) Ditch, which skirts the north end of the area forming part of the border with the City of Manchester, is pre-Norman and visible in places. Six coins from the reigns of the Anglo-Saxon English Kings Edmund (reigned 939–946) and Eadred (reigned 946–955) were found during ploughing at Reddish Green in 1789. There is contrasting source material about the significance of this; Arrowsmith takes this as evidence for existence of a settlement at that time, but Morris states the find could be "an isolated incident".

=== 1066 to late 18th century ===
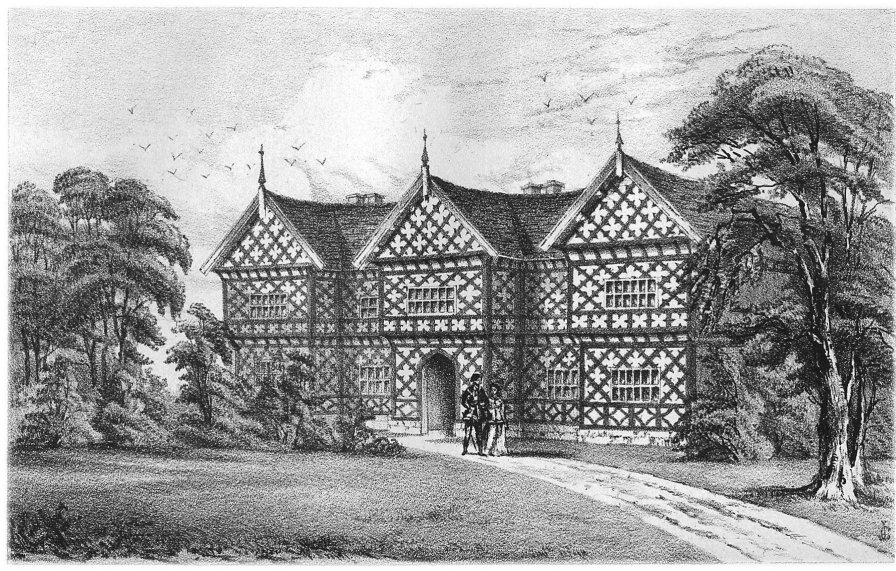
Reddish Hall as drawn by James Croston (Booker, p211)

Reddish does not appear in the Domesday survey, in common with most of the then southeast Lancashire area. A corn mill is known to have existed at the junction of Denton Brook and the River Tame from about 1400 onwards. The two main mediaeval houses were Reddish Hall at grid reference SJ899932 (demolished 1780, but visible on maps dated 1840) and Hulme Hall at grid reference SJ889926, later known as Broadstone, then Broadstone Hall (demolished 1945). The Reddish family were major landowners in the area from at least 1212 to 1613 when title passed by marriage to the Coke family. It passed down the family to Thomas Coke, 1st Earl of Leicester who sold his land in Reddish at the end of the 18th century, and in 1808 it was bought by Robert Hyde Greg and John Greg. There were Hulmes in Reddish in the 13th century, and the land passed through the family until about 1700 when it was given to a charitable trust.

A third medieval hall existed in South Reddish and stood roughly at the top of what is now Woodhall Fields and was known as Wood Hall. The farm (Wood Hall Farm) close by was demolished in the 1970s but it is unclear when the hall was levelled; although it is shown on maps of the early 20th century.

Very few buildings in Reddish pre-date the 19th century. Canal Bridge Farm, close to Broadstone Mill, is dated to the mid to late 18th century (the name is later). Hartwell dates a small group of farm buildings and cottages at Shores Fold, near the junction of Nelstrop Road and Marbury Road, to the 16th and late 17th to early 18th century. These would have been on the traditional Reddish – Heaton Norris border, but are now firmly inside Heaton Chapel.

There are a number of terraced cottages and Small Manor Farm house in separate grounds, which survive today and comprise the original hamlet of Sandfold, off Station Road, North Reddish. These appear to date from some time during the 17th century.

Additionally, a cottage dated c. 1790 still stands opposite and slightly downhill of Canal Bridge Farm on Broadstone Road.

=== Industrial Revolution ===
The Stockport Branch Canal passed through Reddish and opened in 1797. It seems to have had little effect by 1825, when Corry's description of Reddish, in full, was "The population of Reddish is but thin". Booker describes Reddish in 1857 as almost entirely agricultural, being made up of meadow and pasture (1,320 acres); arable land (90 acres); wood and water (50 acres); and buildings and streets (44 acres). At that time, Reddish contained "neither post-office, schoolmaster, lawyer, doctor, nor pawnshop". The population increased over tenfold in the next 50 years with the Industrial Revolution.

The water-powered calico printworks in Reddish Vale on the River Tame is known to have been working before 1800. Industrial development followed the line of the canal and was steam-powered throughout. A variety of manufacturers moved into Reddish during this period.

Robert Hyde Greg and John Greg, sons of Samuel Greg of Quarry Bank Mill, who owned about a third of Reddish by 1857, opened Albert Mills for cotton spinning in 1845. Moor Mill, manufacturing knitting machines, was built around the same time. William Houldsworth's Reddish Mill for cotton spinning was opened in 1864. Hanover Mill was built in 1865 for cotton spinning, but in 1889 was converted to make silk, velvet, woven fur etc.

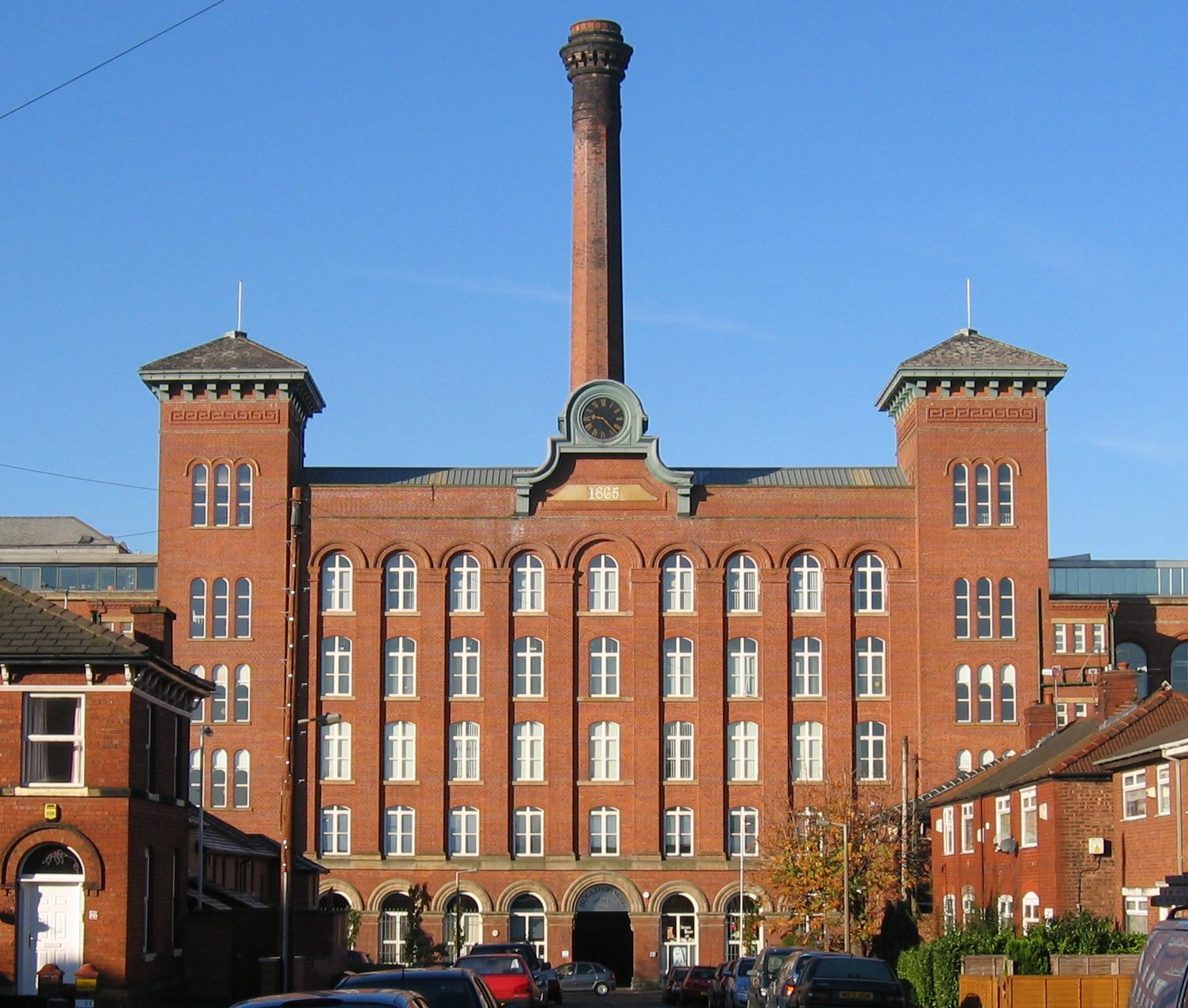
Reddish (Houldsworth) Mill

The Reddish Spinning Company, partly owned by Houldsworth, opened in 1870. Furnival's steelworks, making printing presses, opened in 1877. Andrew's Gas Engine works opened in 1878. The Manchester Guardian's printworks opened in 1899. Craven Brothers' engineering works, making cranes, opened in 1900. Broadstone Spinning Company opened a large double mill in 1906/7. These major employers were accompanied by numerous smaller concerns, including dyeworks, bleachworks, wire ropeworks, brickworks, screw manufacturers, makers of surveying equipment, and a tobacco factory.

A small number of closures of major industrial employers took place in the first half of the 20th century, due to the ebb and flow of trade. Andrew's Gas Engine Works was taken over in 1905 by Richard Hornsby & Sons of Grantham, the business was transferred to Grantham and the Reddish works closed some time during the great depression following WWI. Cronin indicates that the works were still in operation in 1930. The Atlas wire rope works closed in 1927.

Reddish suffered during the decline in Lancashire cotton production and finishing. Broadstone Mills ceased production in 1959; Reddish Mills closed in 1958 with the loss of 350–400 jobs; Spur Mill followed in 1972; and the long-lived Reddish Vale printworks closed by 1975; Albert Mill continued to trade as R. Greg and Co under new ownership, but finally closed in 1982. Ashmore wrote in 1975 that "Stockport has ceased to be a cotton town."

The decline of Broadstone Mills was accompanied by high farce. In November 1958 the company sold a number of spinning mules as scrap for just over £3,000. By agreement, the machines remained in the mill over the winter. A small number had been broken and removed by April 1959, when the government announced a compensation package for firms that agreed to scrap spinning capacity. As ownership of the mules had passed to the scrapman, it was decided that the company was not entitled to compensation amounting to over £60,000, despite the fact that the machinery was still on its premises. Actions in the High Court and the Court of Appeal in 1965 were fruitless.

Some of the mills vacated by the spinners found other uses. The Reddish Spinning Company's mill was taken over by Friedland who became the world's largest manufacture of doorbells; an extension to the mill won several architectural awards. The mill is now residential. Broadstone Mill was partly demolished, but now houses small commercial units. Regeneration efforts at Houldsworth Mill were instrumental in Stockport Council winning British Urban Regeneration Association's award for best practice in regeneration. £12 million has been spent to convert the mill into mixed use. The area around Houldsworth Mill is now designated as a conservation area.

=== Brewing, pubs and clubs ===
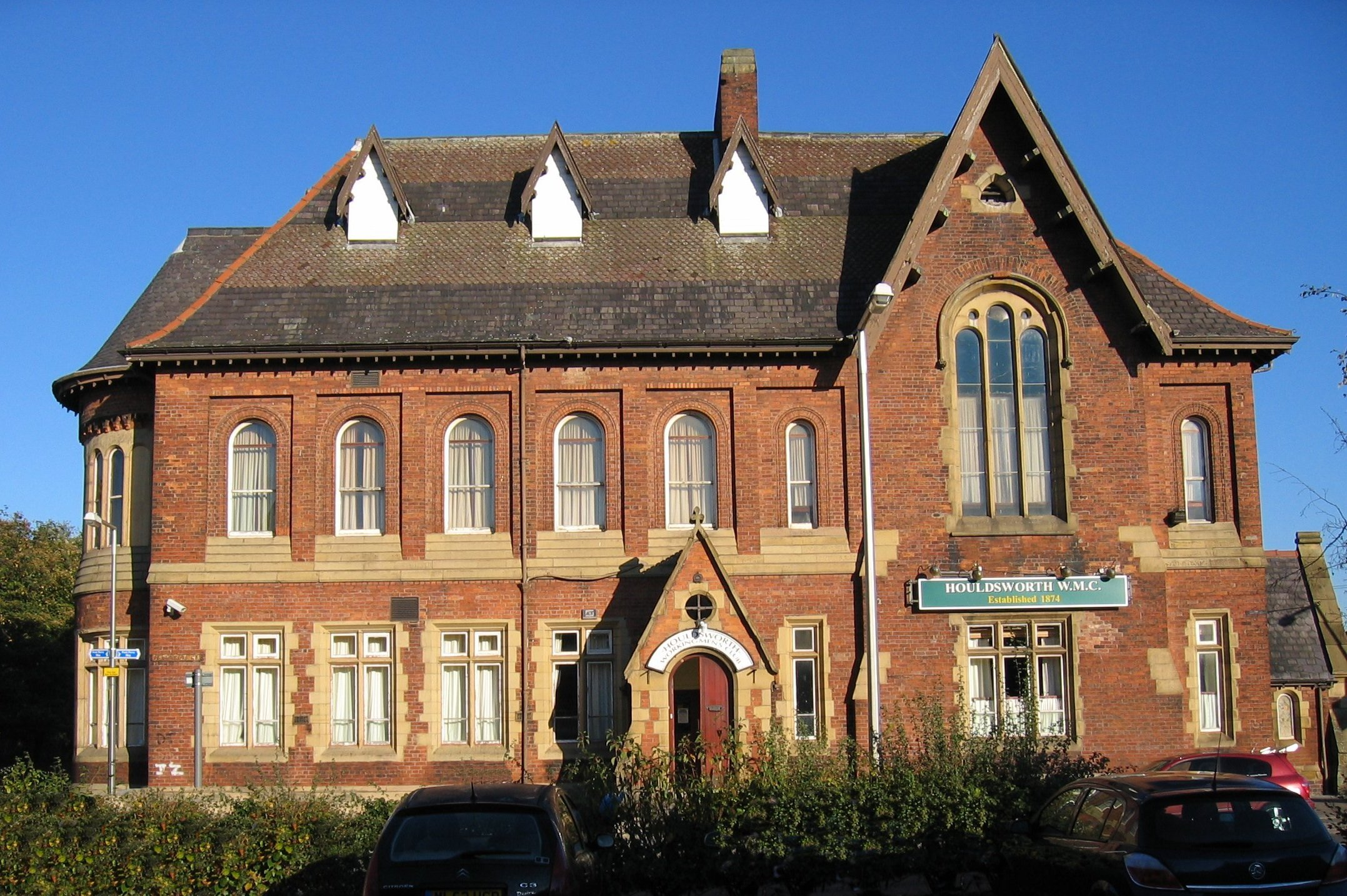
Houldsworth WMC. Also used as a church and school before dedicated buildings were built.

Reddish has been home to at least three breweries. Richard Clarke & Co brewed in the area for over 100 years, before being taken over, and later closed, by Boddingtons in 1962. David Pollard's eponymous brewery opened in the former print works in Reddish Vale in 1975, moving out to Bredbury in 1978; the business went into liquidation in 1982. The small 3 Rivers Brewery has been brewing in Reddish since August 2003.

The pub stock is not well-regarded: "Never offering the best selection of pubs in the borough, it is now easily the worst area for real ale availability ..." is a typical description. It has been suggested that this may be a consequence of Robert Hyde Greg's disapproval of alcohol, (due to the alcoholism of an uncle of his father, see also Samuel Greg). Of the nine pubs in Reddish, two are currently closed and boarded up.

The pubs are supplemented by several working men's and political clubs. The Houldsworth WMC was awarded a blue plaque by Stockport MBC in December 2006. Reddish WMC was founded by in 1845 by millowner Robert Hyde Greg as a Mechanics' Institute and Library. Its members claim it to be the oldest club registered with the CIU.

== Transport ==
=== Canal ===
The Ashton Canal and the Stockport Branch Canal were built to join Manchester and Stockport to the coal mines in Oldham and Ashton-under-Lyne. The branch was dependent on the main for its utility, and hence its planning, passing through parliament, and construction came after that of the main. The main and the branch opened in 1796. The branch was just under five miles (8 km) long, and left the Ashton Canal at Clayton, passed through Gorton and Reddish, and terminated just over the boundary in Heaton Norris, adjacent to what was then the main turnpike between Manchester and Stockport. The Beat Bank Branch Canal was planned as a sub-branch and was intended to cross Reddish Vale to a colliery at Denton, but the scheme was abandoned by 1798. By 1827 the canal was bringing coal to Stockport from as far as Norbury and Poynton.

The canal was purchased by the Manchester, Sheffield and Lincolnshire Railway in 1848. Traffic declined and the canal was described as derelict as early as 1922. Commercial traffic ceased in the 1930s and the canal was declared officially closed in 1962 and filled in.

=== Turnpike ===
The road currently designated the B6167 (Sandy Lane, Reddish Road, Gorton Road, and Reddish Lane) was turnpiked by the Manchester, Denton and Stockport Trust following the Manchester and Hyde Turnpike Road Act 1818 (58 Geo. 3. c. vi).

=== Rail ===
The history of the development of rail infrastructure in the UK is complicated, with lines and stations being built by a myriad of railway companies and joint ventures. Routes did not always follow the best path, but were created, altered, or blocked through lobbying of parliament by interested parties intent on protecting their interests and preventing competition. Due to their strategic position between Manchester and London, Stockport and Reddish played their parts. Reddish played host to three railway lines, two railway stations, and a traction depot.

To improve readability, the names of the stations and lines are the latest (or last) used.

==== Reddish South ====
The West Coast Main Line running between Manchester Piccadilly and London via Crewe was opened in 1840–2 by the Manchester and Birmingham Railway (M&B), crossing the Mersey valley on a large viaduct at Stockport. In 1849 a line was opened from the north side of the viaduct via Reddish South and Denton stations to join the Woodhead Line (Piccadilly to Sheffield) of the Sheffield, Ashton-Under-Lyne and Manchester Railway (SA&MR) at Guide Bridge. A short branch went to Denton Colliery. The station at Reddish South contained a large goods yard, and trade through the station played an important role, alongside the canal, in the industrialisation of the area.

The M&B became part of the London and North Western Railway (LNWR) by 1849: the SA&MR became part of the Manchester, Sheffield and Lincolnshire Railway (MS&L) in 1847. At this stage both companies used Piccadilly as their Manchester terminus. The LNWR held a monopoly on the important London route.

==== Reddish North ====
In 1862 the MS&L built a line from Hyde Junction to near Compstall on the River Goyt. In 1865 this was extended over the river to New Mills, and later joined the Midland Railway's Derbyshire lines. By 1867 Midland trains were running from London to Piccadilly via this (considerably longer) route, providing competition to the LNWR. In 1875, the Sheffield and Midland Railway Companies' Committee, a joint venture between the MS&L and the Midland, opened a new more direct route from near Romiley to Piccadilly, and gave Reddish its second station, Reddish North.

==== Reddish Electric Depot ====
The Midland was given notice to leave Piccadilly in the same year that Reddish North opened, and construction of Manchester Central railway station started. The Fallowfield Line was opened in 1892 to allow access from the Woodhead Line to Manchester Central and Trafford Park, and passed through a corner of Reddish. Stations were built just outside Reddish at Hyde Road and Levenshulme South. In 1936 the MS&L's successor, the London and North Eastern Railway, planned to electrify the Woodhead Line and the Fallowfield Line, primarily for shipping coal from Yorkshire, but World War II interrupted progress. After the war, the railways were nationalised as British Rail (BR). The electrification plan was put in place as the Manchester-Sheffield-Wath electric railway, opening in 1954 using a 1500 V DC system. A 400 ft (120 m) depot was constructed at Reddish to maintain the Class 76 and 77 locomotives. However, electrification was not continued beyond the depot to Trafford Park. Shortly afterwards, BR adopted the 25 kV AC system for electrification, with the effect that the Woodhead Line "passed very quickly from ultra-modern to obsolescent."

Local passenger services stopped using the Fallowfield Line in 1958 (though through trains continued until 1969). The Beeching Report of 1963 recommended that the Woodhead Line be retained and the Hope Valley Line (serving Reddish North Station) closed; in 1966 BR controversially implemented the reverse.

The depot was used to house the prestigious Midland Pullman in the early 1960s and continued to service locomotives until it and the Woodhead Line were closed in 1981. Despite rumours that the depot would be used to service the Manchester Metrolink, the depot fully closed in 1983, was quickly vandalised, and has been demolished. The Fallowfield line closed completely in 1988 and the track was taken up.

== Demographics ==
Population growth in Reddish since 1774
Year	1774	1811	1821	1831	1841	1851	1861	1871	1881	1891	1901	1911	1921	1931
Population	302	456	574	860	1,188	1,218	1,363	2,329	5,557	6,854	8,668	14,252	15,386	15,463
Source:A Vision of Britain through Time

Some housing built by factory owners for their employees remains. Greg Street, Birkdale Road, and Broadstone Hall Road South have mid-19th century terraces built by the Gregs for the workers at their (demolished) Victoria and Albert Mills. Furnival Street was built in 1886 to house workers at the (demolished) Furnival's ironworks The largest collection is that built by Houldsworth near to his Reddish Mill, even though only Liverpool Street and Houldsworth Street remain after clearance in about 1974. The houses on Houldsworth Street, directly facing the mill, are grander, and would have been for the higher placed workers.

Of the 1907 facilities provided by Stockport, only the library is still open, though under threat of closure. The baths closed in 2005; there is a campaign to reopen them, but it does not have the backing of the council. The ground floor of the fire station is used as a community centre. The mortuary closed in the 1980s.
