= Reddish Vale =

Vale in Greater Manchester, England

Coordinates: 53°26′18″N 2°8′32″W

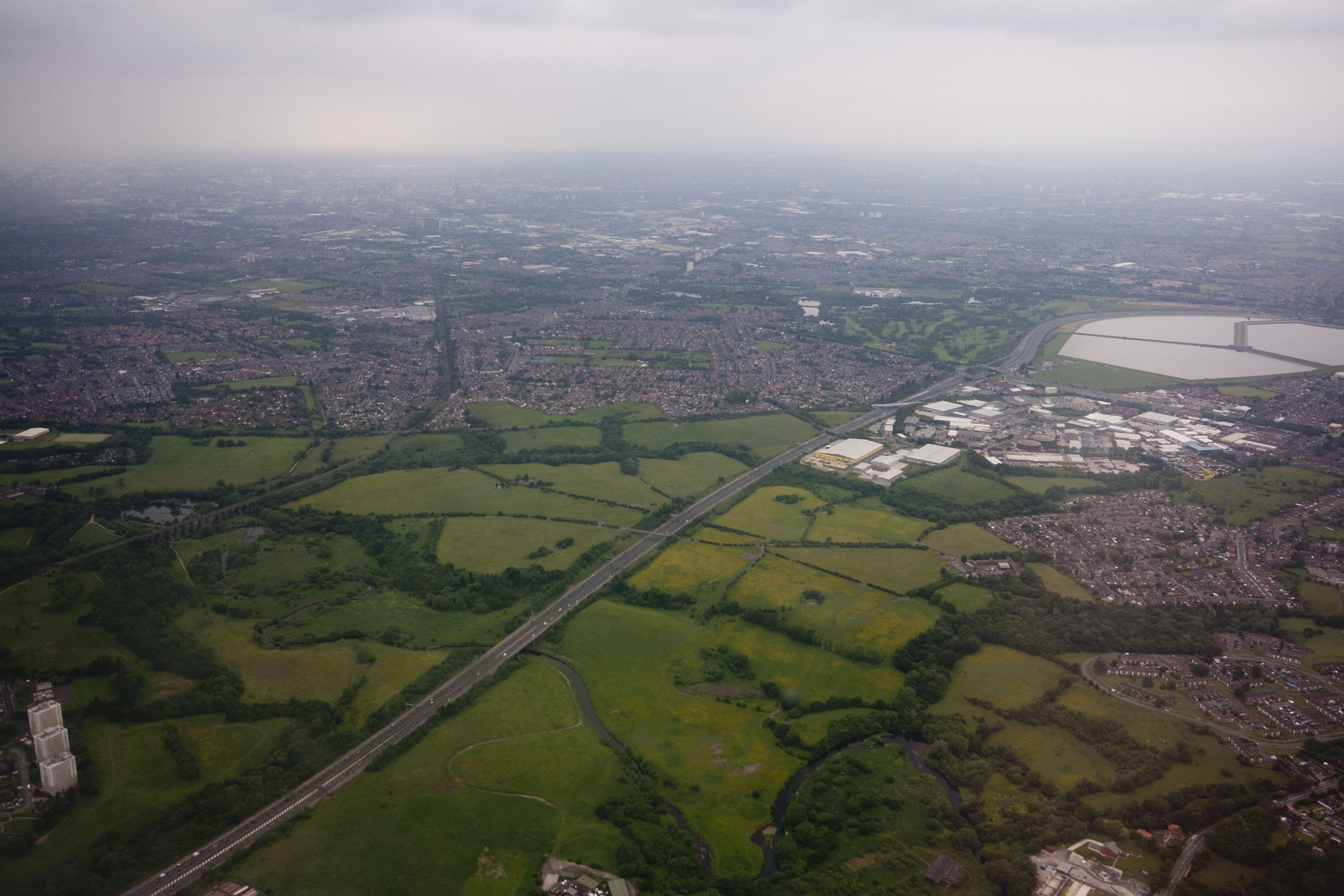
Reddish Vale viewed from the south east in 2010

Reddish Vale is in the Tame Valley close to Reddish, Stockport, Greater Manchester, England. The centre of the vale is around the bottom of Reddish Vale Road. Reddish Vale Country Park is a country park managed by Stockport Metropolitan Borough Council (SMBC). It covers 161 hectares (400 acres) in all and comprises some of the traditional Reddish Vale area, Reddish Vale Farm and the grazing land and Woodhall Fields, about 0.5 miles (0.80 km) to the south. Part of it is a designated local nature reserve (LNR).

== Description and history ==
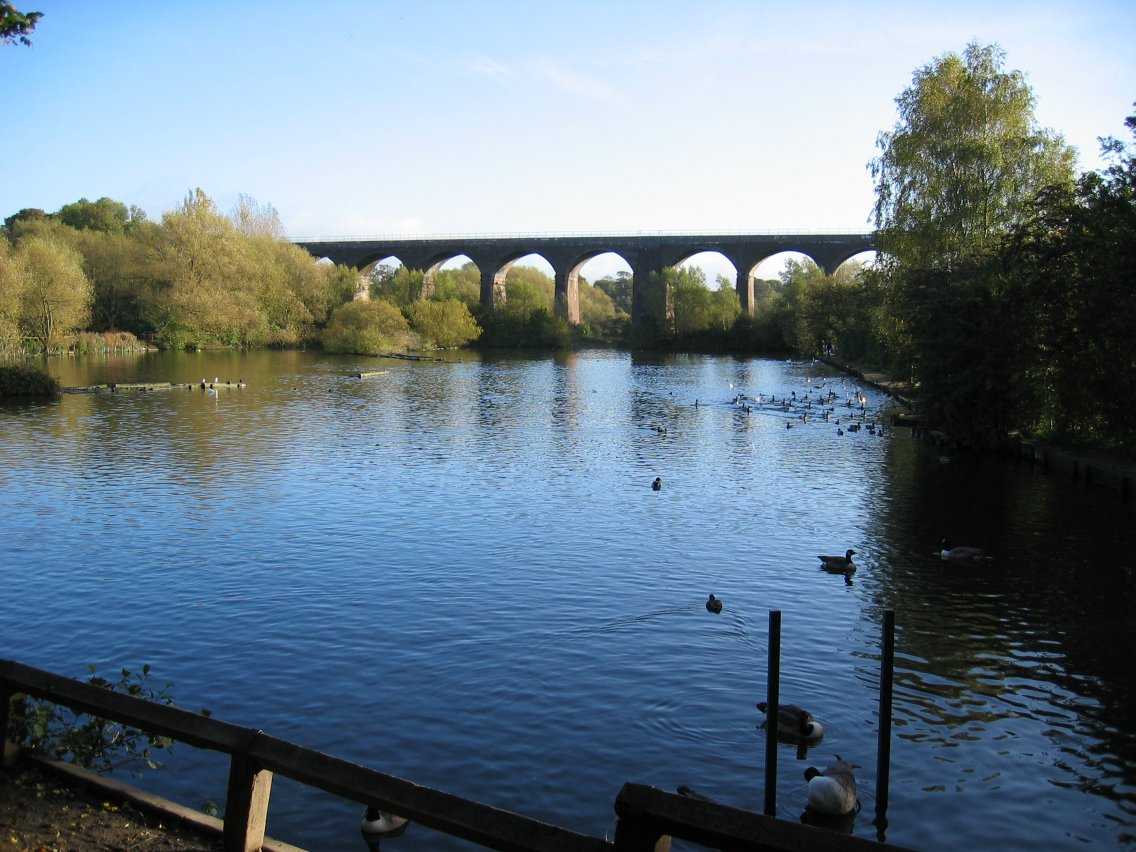
The Reddish Vale Viaduct and former mill pond in 2006

Reddish Vale is mainly green space, comprising woodland, flat riverside meadows, sloping fields used to graze horses and a golf course. At the end of Reddish Vale Road near grid reference SJ905935 is a small car park and a visitors' centre housed in portable cabins. A number of footpaths lead in all directions, with the more popular ones following the line of the river, both up and downstream.

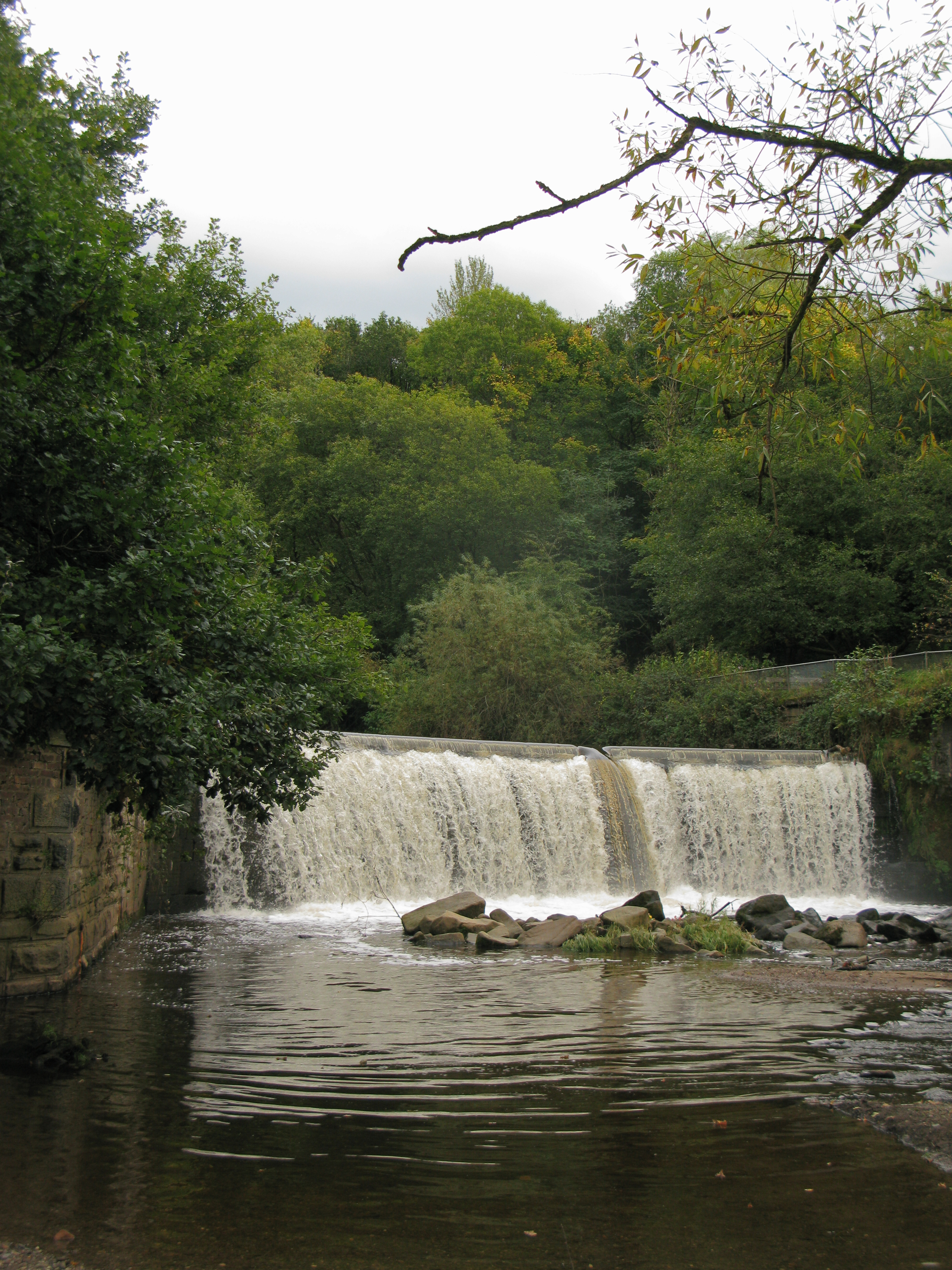
Harrison's Weir in the lower part of the park, 2024

Highly visible from the visitors' centre is the 16-arch brick viaduct built in 1875 to carry the Hope Valley Line over the Tame Valley. There is a legend that during construction a local witch cursed the viaduct and anyone who counted the number of arches. A railway line once led to Stockport from Reddish Junction at the Brinnington (east) side of the viaduct. This line has been turned into a public bridleway joining the two parts of the country park and forms a section of the Trans Pennine Trail. The Stockport–Stalybridge line forms part of the western boundary of the vale. A spur once ran to the colliery at Denton. Its position is still visible in places marked by a hedgerow that runs alongside Ross Lave Lane.

Where the line had to span Denton Brook, an embankment was built using slag and other waste from the mine. This slag was ignited by the hot summers of 1975 and 1976. It continued to smoulder and smoke for a number years until the site was bulldozed and cleared in 1981. Train drivers called the place 'smokey ridge', along the bottom of Denton Brook bricks used for the tunnel can still be seen. Some locals refer to Ross Lave Lane as 'piggy's alley' as there was once a pig farm on the Denton side of the viaduct on the embankment above where Denton Brook joins the River Tame. There was a plan at the end of the 18th century for the Beat Bank Branch Canal to run across the vale, and some sections were dug, but it was abandoned before completion.

Nearby are two mill ponds left over from industrial activity in the vale. The ponds were fed from the river above a weir (destroyed in floods in the 1960s, all that remains is the sluice gate) on the upstream side of the viaduct, and provided both power and processing water to Reddish Vale Print Works, a calico printing works dating from before 1800. The works had ceased printing by 1975, and have now been demolished and the land turned into a butterfly park. The ponds are now used for angling, and attract herons and a variety of ducks. Most of the race has been filled in, but a short length carries Denton Brook down to the river. Denton Brook (and a small tributary) marks the traditional boundary between Reddish and Denton. The manorial corn mill (one of several to be known as Reddish Mill) was sited over the brook and was demolished in about 1860 when the ponds were extended.

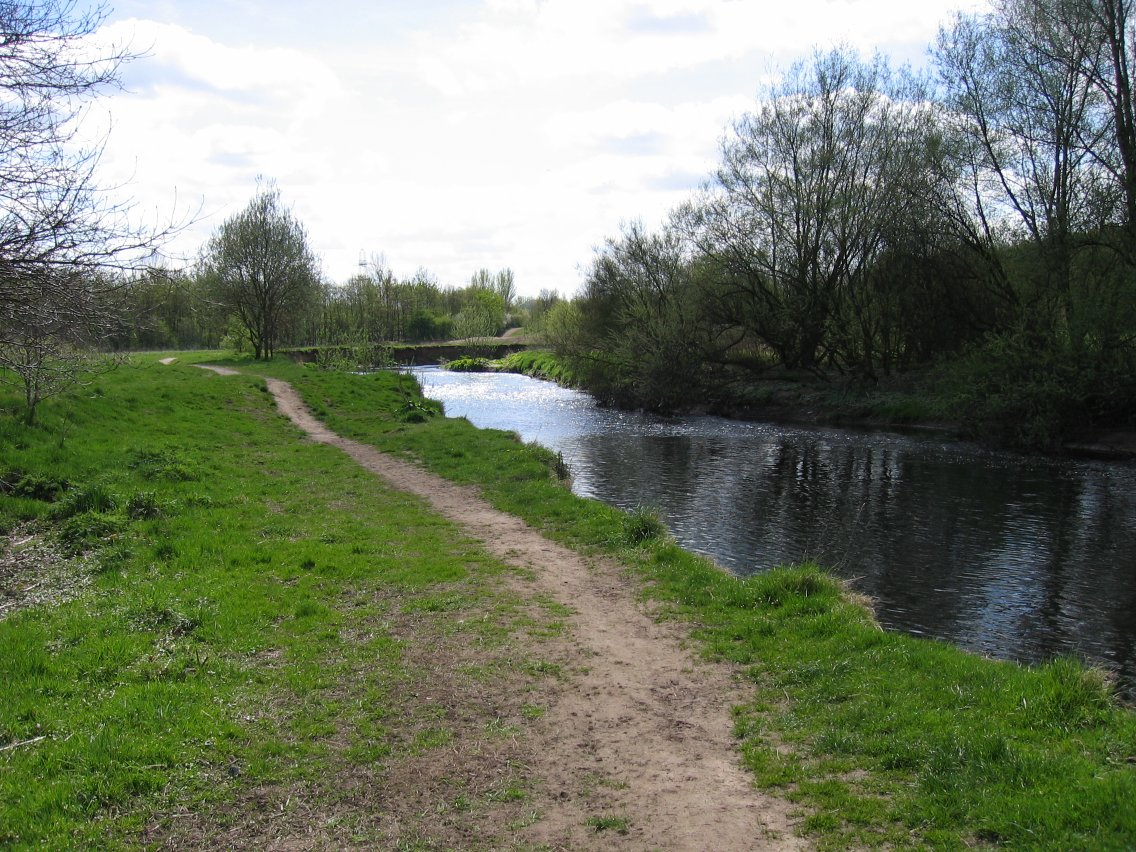
The River Tame in the lower part of the park, 2006

Woodhall Fields form the southern or lower (with reference to the river) part of the park. The weir here was used to feed the Portwood Cut, dug in 1796, which ran to the Portwood area of Stockport and powered a number of mills around the start of the 19th century. Part of the fields were once a landfill site for fly ash; this has proved to be a good growing medium for orchids.

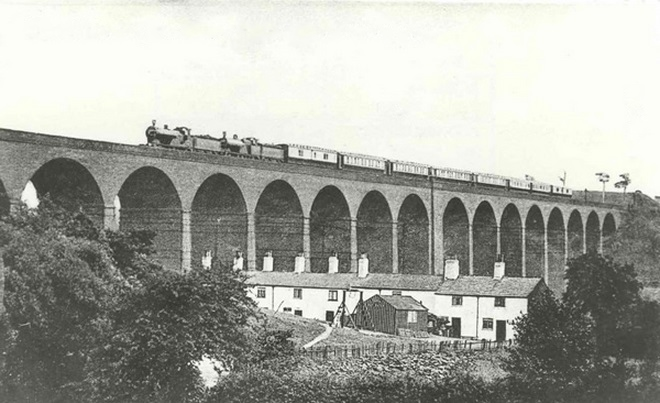
The LNWR Royal Train travels over the Reddish Vale Viaduct, 1905

Whilst not really in the vale, at the northern end the late 16th-century Arden Hall, Bredbury or 'Cromwell's Castle' (where Oliver Cromwell allegedly spent the night) and the 17th-century Hyde Hall, Denton overlook it and form part of the overall landscape. Both are in private hands and not open to the public.

In January 2022, Network Rail started urgent repair work to protect the foundations of Reddish Vale Viaduct from river erosion. After major storms halted engineers, work was restarted in February 2022.

In January 2024, a meerkat escaped Reddish Vale Farm.

During floods in January 2025, a small metal bridge near to Harrison's Weir was destroyed, and Electricity North West closed the site down to assess the damage. As of September 2025, it is still yet to be repaired or replaced.

== Other activities ==
Reddish Vale Golf Club was designed in 1912 by Alister MacKenzie, and takes up a substantial area on both sides of the river, but does not form part of the country park. The club house was once a substantial private house in its own grounds.

Just above the visitors' centre, on Reddish Vale Road, is Reddish Vale Farm, with riding stables, meerkats and a children's farm. The buildings and associated grazing were Stockton's Dairy Farm until 1996.

The Trans Pennine Trail and the Tame Valley Walk pass through the park.

== Housing ==
There is now very little housing in the vale. There are 12 terraced houses opposite the farm on the road leading down to the vale. At the bottom of the road opposite the visitors' centre is a large dwelling known as Tame House. Tame House was once the offices for the Calico print works. At the back of Tame House is a dirt track called Riverview; there are kennels for racing greyhounds halfway down the track. This was once the canteen for the workers at the print works. Adjacent to the canteen was a large Victorian house but this was demolished in the 1960s. Further along Riverview, where the track meets the river, once stood two rows of terraced houses identical to the ones opposite the farm. These were also demolished in the 1960s after being declared 'slum dwellings'. The same fate may have befallen the terraces opposite the farm if not for the intervention of two twin brothers, John and Christopher Byrne, who removed the compulsory purchase orders put on them, and organised the installation of a sanitation system.

There were nine houses situated between the viaduct and the mill ponds, built to house the workers constructing the viaduct. They were later demolished for expansion of the reservoirs. On the opposite side of the river to where Strines Weir once was there were two houses known as Strines Cottages which were farm dwellings. A recent archaeological dig found the foundations of these structures. There was a flour mill situated above Denton Brook not far from Mill Lane. In later years it was used as a school and was known as 'the ark' because of the flowing water visible through the gaps in the floorboards. It appears that there has never been a church in the vale.

== Recent threats and developments ==
Recent proposals to change the nature of the vale have been met with robust opposition. In 1988, the government of the day asked the Greater Manchester Residuary Body to sell off its holdings in the area; 3,000 people, worried that it would be sold to developers, gathered in the vale to protest. The land was acquired by Stockport Metropolitan Borough Council in 1995. They arrived as three contingents from Brinnington, North Reddish and South Reddish.

In 1990, a proposal to create an artificial ski slope at Woodhall Fields was opposed by 7,000 signatories to a petition. The opposition was led by the Tame Valley Defence Group supported by Labour MP Andrew Bennett and the Reddish Reporter. The Defence Group had made trips to the various ski slopes and supplied local people with reports on Sheffield Ski Slope. This proposal echoed an earlier proposal for a snow dome which was opposed by South Reddish Action Group, who were later to merge with the Tame Valley Defence Group to protect the vale.

In 1992, the golf club hoped to use part of the vale as landfill; the plans did not come to fruition. This again was opposed by the Tame Valley Defence Group who were strongly supported in this by the Director of Public Health in Stockport.

In September 2013, proposals were made to build 292 homes to help regenerate Brinnington which included the sale of 1.3 hectares of Reddish Vale Country Park to developers for 30 houses, which was met with protests. In January 2015, work was approved for 280 homes, and despite 14,000 signatures on petitions in protest of this, builders started work on 70 homes there in November 2016.

== History of crimes and suicides ==
In 1997, the discarded remains of an 8-year-old boy were found at Reddish Vale Golf Club, after having been murdered by a local bus driver, who had groomed him.

In November 2010, after already having been assaulted a man was taken to the Reddish Vale by other two men, and repeatedly stabbed in the neck with a chisel, before being thrown into the River Tame.

In August 2011, a 16-year-old girl from Rixton-with-Glazebrook, Warrington was found unconscious at the Reddish Vale, after she had been given MDMA by three men, and later died due to an overdose after being taken to Stepping Hill Hospital.

In July 2018, a man was stabbed by two strangers during an unprovoked attack whilst angling at night.

In May 2020, a man from Brinnington discarded the dismembered remains of his estranged wife at the Reddish Vale in three black bin bags. Her remains were found by a dog walker, and he was subsequently charged with murder, and given life imprisonment with a minimum term of 12 years.

In September 2021, a 55-year-old woman from Moss Side, Manchester was found dead in a deep ravine by a dog walker after she had committed suicide.

In April 2022, a 46-year-old man was found hanged at the Reddish Vale; it was later determined to have been a suicide. In July 2022, a 24-year-old man also hanged himself there.

In April 2023, a murder investigation was launched after a 26-year-old man from Gorton, Manchester was found dead in a pool of water at the Reddish Vale. In November 2024, it was later determined that he had fallen, and drowned in the River Tame after violently robbing a man at a camper van with an accomplice, and taking an iPhone 14, which helped to determine his final location.
