= Eddie Phillipson =

English cricketer and umpire

Personal information
- Full name: William Edward Phillipson
- Born: 3 December 1910; North Reddish, Lancashire, England
- Died: 25 August 1991 (aged 80); Trafford, Lancashire, England
- Batting: Right-handed
- Bowling: Right-arm fast-medium
- Role: All-rounder, umpire

Domestic team information
- Years: Team
- 1933–1948: Lancashire
- 1950–1952: Northumberland

Umpiring information
- Tests umpired: 12 (1958–1965)
- FC umpired: 534 (1956–1978)
- LA umpired: 164 (1964–1979)

Career statistics
Competition	First-class
Matches	162
Runs scored	4,096
Batting average	25.76
100s/50s	2/22
Top score	113
Balls bowled	29,501
Wickets	555
Bowling average	24.72
5 wickets in innings	29
10 wickets in match	6
Best bowling	8/100
Catches/stumpings	82/–
- Source: CricketArchive, 8 December 2024

William Edward Phillipson (3 December 1910 – 25 August 1991) was an English first-class cricketer. He played for Lancashire County Cricket Club from 1933 to 1948, and then Minor Counties cricket for Northumberland before becoming a Test cricket umpire.
