= Brinnington railway station =

Railway station in Greater Manchester, England

Coordinates: 53.4319°N 2.1341°W

Brinnington
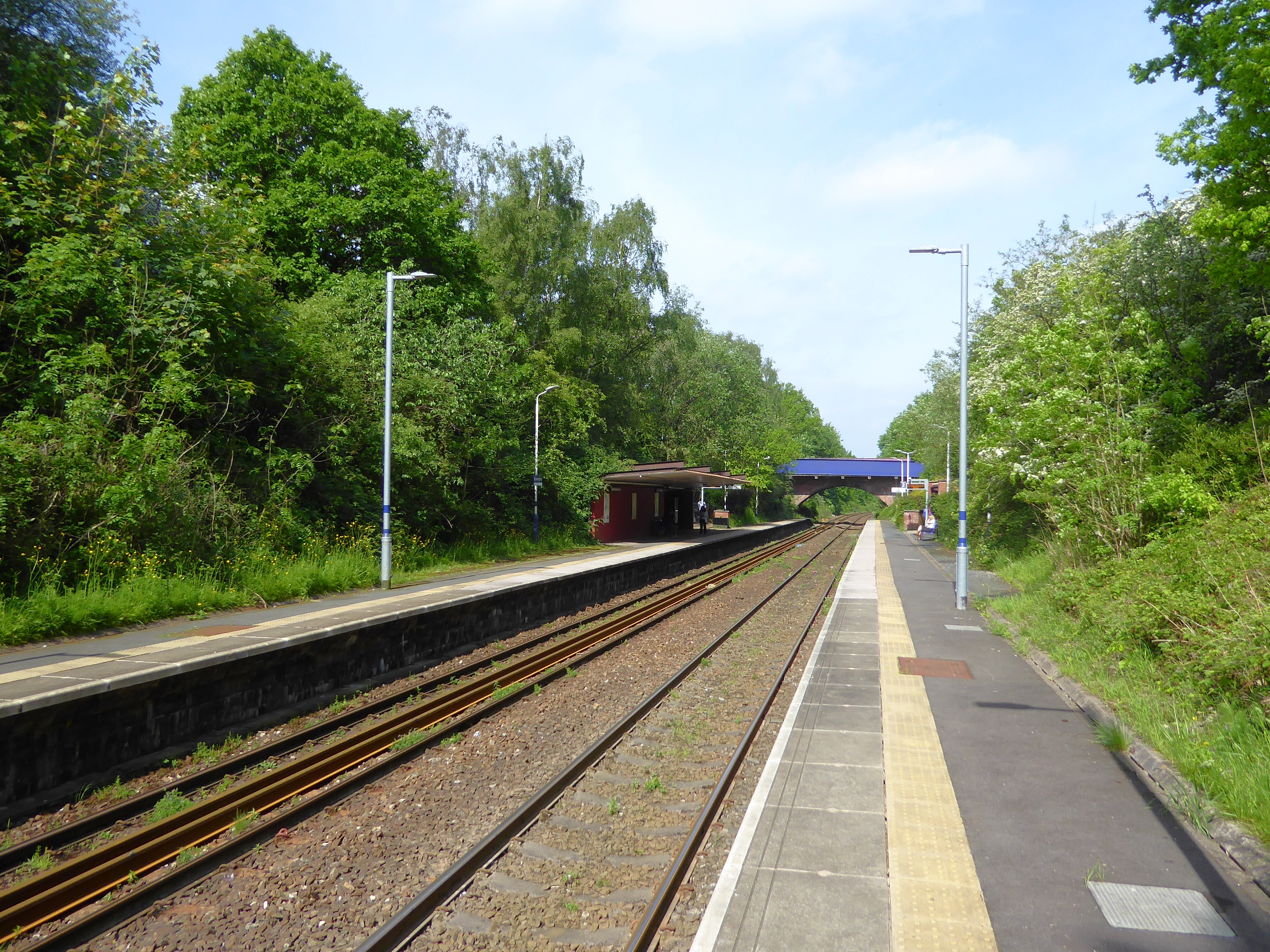
- Brinnington station in 2024

General information
- Location: Brinnington, Stockport; England
- Grid reference: SJ911928
- Manager: Northern Trains
- Transit authority: Greater Manchester
- Platforms: 2

Other information
- Station code: BNT
- Classification: DfT category E

History
- Opened: 12 December 1977

Passengers
- 2020/21: ▼32,852
- 2021/22: ▲78,476
- 2022/23: ▲82,072
- 2023/24: ▲99,400
- 2024/25: ▼88,708
Location
Notes
- Passenger statistics from the Office of Rail and Road

Brinnington railway station serves Brinnington in the eastern part of Stockport, Greater Manchester, England. It is on the Hope Valley Line between Manchester Piccadilly and Sheffield. It is managed by Northern Trains.

== History ==
It is a relatively new station, opened on 12 December 1977 by British Rail. The line was built originally by the Sheffield and Midland Railway Companies' Committee in 1875 between New Mills Central and Manchester London Road (now Piccadilly station).

== Facilities ==
The station has a staffed ticket office at street level, which is opened through the day on weekdays (06:30-20:50) and on Saturdays until early afternoon (07:20-14:25). Outside these times, tickets must be bought from the ticket machine or a promise to pay obtained.

Platform-level amenities are limited to waiting shelters, timetable posters, digital CIS displays and bench seating. Automated train announcements are also provided.

Access to the platforms is via footbridge and inclined ramps with steps at regular intervals, which are extremely difficult to use with a wheelchair.

== Service ==
The current off-peak service in trains per hour is:

- 2 tph to Manchester Piccadilly (1 non-stop, 1 stopping)
- 2 tph to New Mills Central, of which 1 continues to Sheffield

On Sundays, there is an hourly service between Manchester Piccadilly and Sheffield.

Preceding station	National Rail	Following station
Bredbury	Northern Trains Hope Valley Line	Reddish North
