= South Reddish =

Area in Reddish, Greater Manchester, United Kingdom

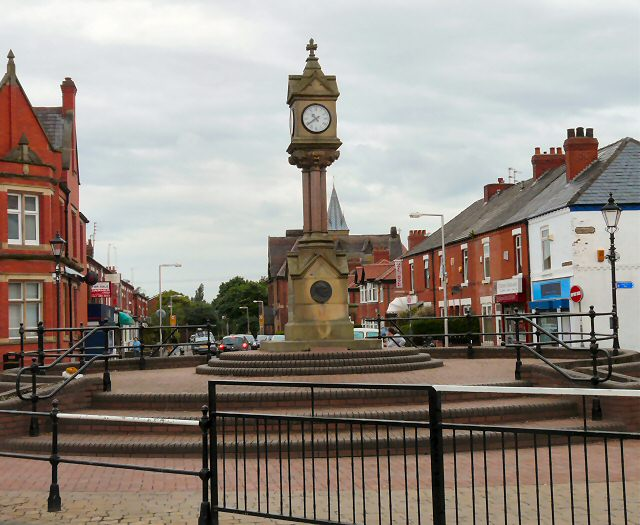
Houldsworth Square in Central Reddish, 2009

South Reddish is the southern part of Reddish, in Stockport, Greater Manchester, England.

South Reddish or Reddish South can refer to:

- A loosely defined geographical area covering the southern part of Reddish;
- A precisely defined ward named Reddish South that elects three councillors to Stockport Metropolitan Borough Council (SMBC); or
- A disused railway station in Reddish renowned for only two scheduled services per week (one return service on Saturday mornings) operated by Northern Trains.
