= Reddish =

Suburb of Stockport, in Greater Manchester, England

Coordinates: 53.4383°N 2.1613°W

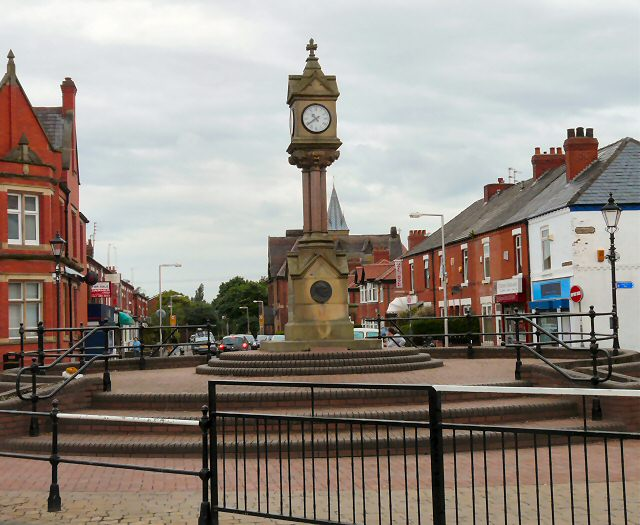
- Houldsworth Square in central Reddish, 2009

- Location within Greater Manchester
- Area: 2.73 sq mi (7.1 km^{2})
- Population: 28,052 (2011 Census)
  - Density: 11,009/sq mi (4,251/km^{2})
- OS grid reference: SJ893935
  - London: 159 mi (256 km) SE
- Metropolitan borough: Stockport
- Metropolitan county: Greater Manchester
- Region: North West
- Country: England
- Sovereign state: United Kingdom
- Post town: STOCKPORT
- Postcode district: SK4, SK5
- Dialling code: 0161
- Police: Greater Manchester
- Fire: Greater Manchester
- Ambulance: North West
- UK Parliament: Stockport

Reddish is an area of the Metropolitan Borough of Stockport, Greater Manchester, England; it lies 4.6 miles (7.4 km) south-east of Manchester city centre. At the 2021 census, the population was 22,203. Historically part of Lancashire, Reddish grew rapidly in the Industrial Revolution and still retains landmarks from that period, such as Houldsworth Mill, a former textile mill. Reddish Vale is a country park.

== History ==
=== Toponymy ===
Reddish is recorded as Redich (1205, 1212), Redych, Radich (1226), Radish, Rediche (1262), Redditch (1381), Redwyche, Radishe and Reddishe (16th century). The name either means "reedy ditch" (OE hrēod-dīc) or "red ditch" (OE rēad-dīc). Ekwall (1922) allows either form, stating "red" is less probable; Mills (1991) and Arrowsmith (1997) only give the "reed" option. The ditch referred to is possibly the Nico Ditch, an earthwork of uncertain origin bordering Reddish, Manchester and Denton. Folklore has it that the names Gorton and Reddish arose from a battle between Saxons and Danes. John Higson wrote in 1852

The neigh'ring trench is called the Nicker Ditch
Flowing with blood, it did the name convey
To th' bordering hamlet, Red-Ditch. Near here, Where
the last 'tween the foes was fought,
Where victory was won, that memorable
Eminence proudly was distinguished
By the name of Winning Hill. The streamlet
Aforemention'd gains appellation
Of Gore Brook, also the contiguous
Happy hamlet through which it floweth still
Bears, in glorious commemoration,
And e'er shall, the honour'd name of Gore Town.

Farrer and Brownbill dismiss this interpretation as "popular fancy".

=== 1066 to late 18th century ===
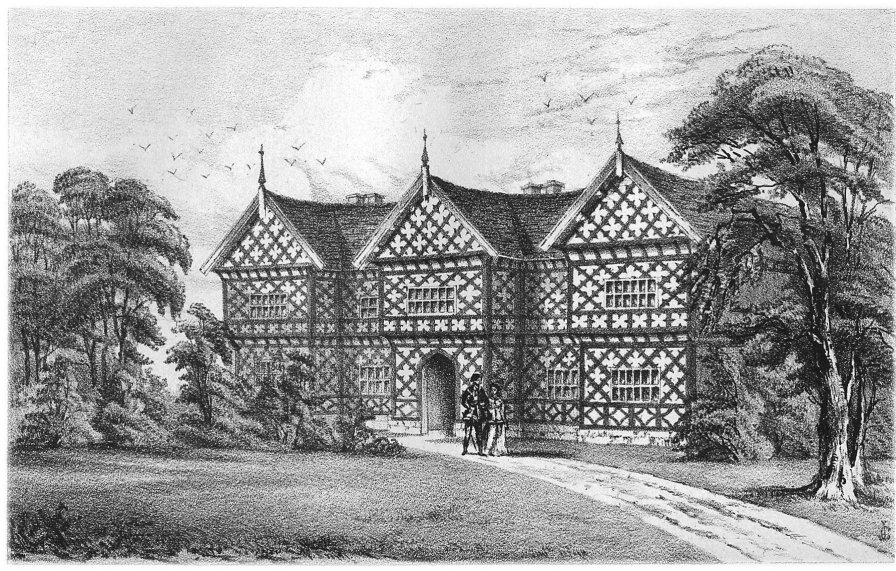
Reddish Hall as drawn by James Croston (Booker, p211)

Reddish does not appear in the Domesday survey; this is in common with most of the then southeast Lancashire area. A corn mill is known to have existed at the junction of Denton Brook and the River Tame from about 1400 onwards. The two main mediaeval houses were Reddish Hall at grid reference SJ899932 (demolished 1780, but visible on maps dated 1840) and Hulme Hall at grid reference SJ889926, later known as Broadstone, then Broadstone Hall (demolished 1945). The Reddish family were major landowners in the area from at least 1212 to 1613 when title passed by marriage to the Coke family. It passed down the family to Thomas Coke, 1st Earl of Leicester, who sold his land in Reddish at the end of the 18th century, and in 1808 it was bought by Robert Hyde Greg and John Greg. There were Hulmes in Reddish in the 13th century, and the land passed through the family until about 1700 when it was given to a charitable trust.

Very few buildings in Reddish pre-date the 19th century. Canal Bridge Farm, close to Broadstone Mill, is dated to the mid to late 18th century (the name is later). Hartwell dates a small group of farm buildings and cottages at Shores Fold, near the junction of Nelstrop Road and Marbury Road, to the sixteenth and late seventeenth to early 18th century. These would have been on the traditional Reddish – Heaton Norris border, but are now firmly inside Heaton Chapel.

=== Industrial Revolution ===
The Stockport Branch Canal passed through Reddish and opened in 1797. It seems to have had little effect by 1825, when Corry's description of Reddish, in full, was "The population of Reddish is but thin". Booker states that in 1857 Reddish was almost entirely agricultural, being made of meadow and pasture (1,320 acres (5.3 km^{2})); arable land (90 acres (360,000 m^{2})); wood and water (50 acres (200,000 m^{2})); and buildings and streets (44 acres (180,000 m^{2})). At that time, Reddish contained "neither post-office, schoolmaster, lawyer, doctor, nor pawnshop". The population increased over tenfold in the next fifty years with the Industrial Revolution.

The water-powered calico printworks in Reddish Vale on the River Tame is known to have been working before 1800. Industrial development followed the line of the canal and was steam-powered throughout. A variety of manufacturers moved into Reddish during this period.

Robert Hyde Greg and John Greg, sons of Samuel Greg of Quarry Bank Mill, who owned about a third of Reddish by 1857, opened Albert Mills for cotton spinning in 1845. Moor Mill, manufacturing knitting machines, was built around the same time. William Houldsworth's Reddish Mill for cotton spinning was opened in 1864. Hanover Mill was built in 1865 for cotton spinning, but in 1889 was converted to make silk, velvet, woven fur etc.

The Reddish Spinning Company, partly owned by Houldsworth, opened in 1870. Furnival & Co, making printing presses, opened in 1877. Andrew's Gas Engine works opened in 1878. The Manchester Guardian's printworks opened in 1899. Craven Brothers, a manufacturer of machine tools and cranes, opened the Vauxhall Works on Greg Street, in 1900. Broadstone Spinning Company opened a large double mill in 1906/7. These major employers were accompanied by numerous smaller concerns, including dyeworks, bleachworks, wire ropeworks, brickworks, screw manufacturers, makers of surveying equipment and a tobacco factory.

A small number of closures of major industrial employers took place in the first half of the 20th century, due to the ebb and flow of trade. Andrew's Gas Engine Works was taken over in 1905 by Richard Hornsby & Sons of Grantham, the business was transferred to Grantham and the Reddish works closed some time during the great depression following WWI. Cronin indicates that the works were still in operation in 1930. The Atlas wire rope works closed in 1927.

Reddish took its share of the decline in Lancashire cotton production and finishing. Broadstone Mills ceased production in 1959; Reddish Mills closed in 1958 with the loss of 350-400 jobs; Spur Mill followed in 1972; and the long-lived Reddish Vale printworks closed by 1975; Albert Mill continued to trade as R. Greg and co under new ownership, but finally closed in 1982. Ashmore wrote in 1975 that "Stockport has ceased to be a cotton town."

The decline of Broadstone Mills was accompanied by high farce. In November 1958 the company sold a number of spinning mules as scrap for just over £3,000. By agreement, the machines remained in the mill over the winter. A small number had been broken and removed by April 1959, when the government announced a compensation package for firms that agreed to scrap spinning capacity. As the title in the mules had passed to the scrapman, it was decided that the company was not entitled to compensation amounting to over £60,000, despite the fact that the machinery was still on its premises. Actions in the High Court and the Court of Appeal in 1965 were fruitless.

Some of the mills vacated by the spinners found other uses. The Reddish Spinning Company's mill was taken over by V. & E. Friedland who became the world's largest manufacture of doorbells; an extension to the mill won several architectural awards. The mill is now residential. Broadstone Mill was partly demolished, but now houses small commercial units. Regeneration efforts at Houldsworth Mill were instrumental in Stockport Council winning British Urban Regeneration Association's award for best practice in regeneration. £12 million has been spent to convert the mill into mixed use. The area around Houldsworth mill is now designated as a conservation area.

=== Brewing, pubs and clubs ===
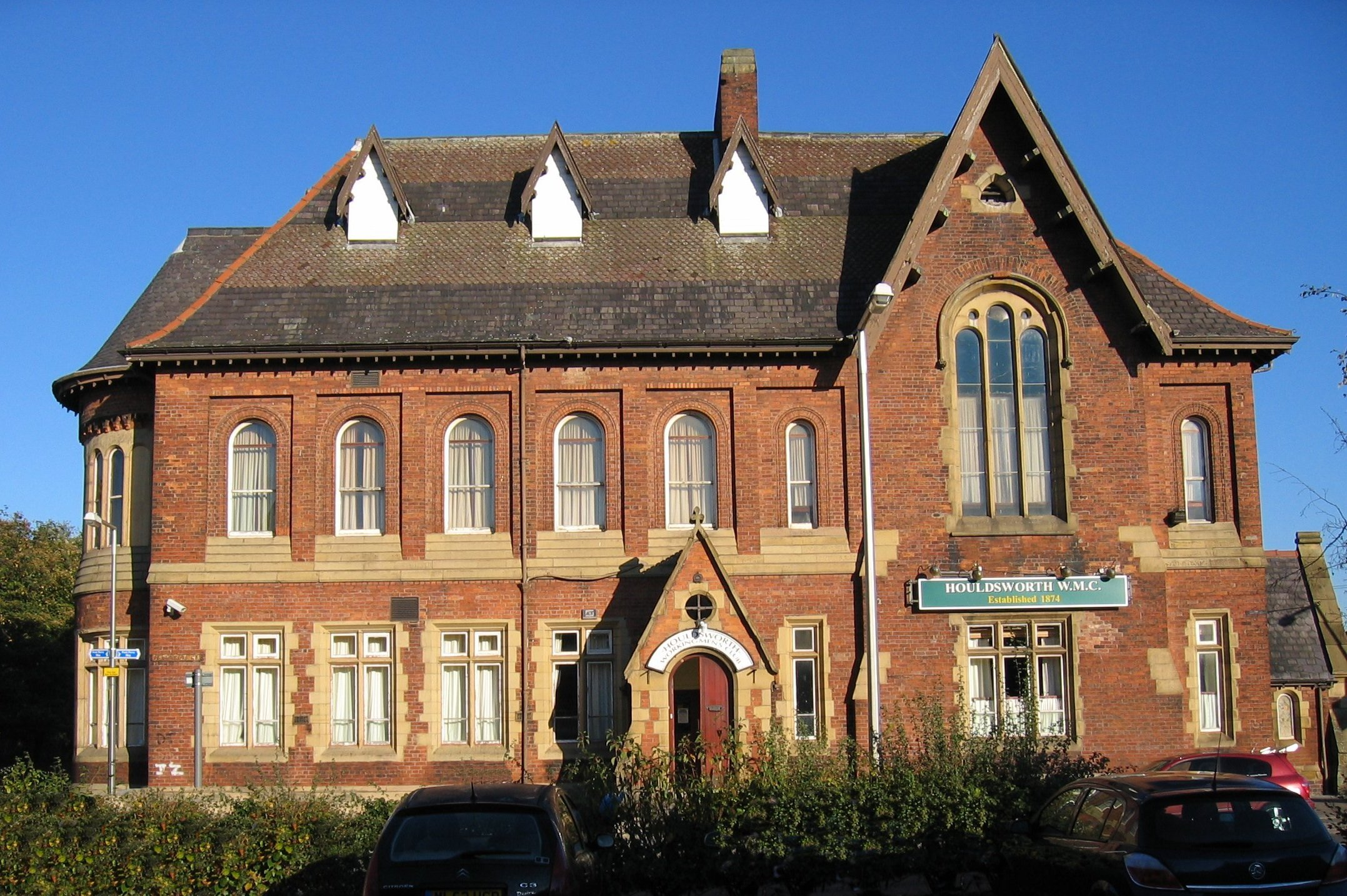
Houldsworth WMC. Also used as a church and school before dedicated buildings were built.

Reddish has been home to at least three breweries. Richard Clarke & Co brewed in the area for over 100 years, before being taken over, and later closed, by Boddingtons in 1962. David Pollard's eponymous brewery opened in the former print works in Reddish Vale in 1975, moving out to Bredbury in 1978; the business went into liquidation in 1982. The small 3 Rivers Brewery started brewing in Reddish in 2003 but had ceased brewing when the company was wound up in 2009.

The pub stock is not well-regarded: "Never offering the best selection of pubs in the borough, it is now easily the worst area for real ale availability ..." is a typical description. It has been suggested that this may be a consequence of Robert Hyde Greg's disapproval of alcohol, (due to the alcoholism of an uncle of his father, see also Samuel Greg). The pubs are supplemented by several working men's and political clubs. The Houldsworth WMC was awarded a blue plaque by Stockport MBC in December 2006. Reddish WMC was founded by in 1845 by millowner Robert Hyde Greg as a Mechanics' Institute and Library. Its members claim it to be the oldest club registered with the CIU.

== Governance ==
The extents have been well-defined for at least several hundred years. Reddish was a township and chapelry in the ancient parish of Manchester, but lay outside the Manor of Manchester. This had the effect that boundaries of Reddish were described by the boundaries of the Manor of Manchester, with the exception of that with Cheshire, which was the River Tame. The manor boundaries were surveyed and recorded in 1322, and the relevant part was:

following the said water [Tame] to the mid [stream] between the county of Chester and Assheton unto the Mereclowe at Redyshe so following Mereclowe unto Saltergate, from thence following the ditch of Redyshe unto Mikeldiche, following that unto Peyfyngate, following that unto Le Turrepittes between Heton Norreyes and Redishe, from thence following Le Merebroke unto the confluence of the waters of Tame and Mersey

"Mere" means boundary in this context. The description was traced into early 20th century features by Crofton and can be cast as

following the middle of the Tame as far as Denton Brook at Reddish; and so following Denton Brook and a tributary as far as Thornley Lane South; and then following Thornley Lane as far as Nico Ditch; and following Nelstrop Road as far as the turf-pits between Heaton Norris and Reddish (these are lost); and from there following Black Brook as far as near the conjunction of the waters of the Tame and Goyt.

However, Black Brook cannot be le Merebroke as it does not flow to the Tame, but joins Cringle Brook, which flows into the Mersey several miles away via Chorlton Brook. With this exception, Crofton's interpretation of the 1322 boundaries matches those shown on Ordnance Survey maps of the 19th century.

In 1866, Reddish became a separate civil parish. Reddish became an urban district in 1894. By 1901 the neighbouring County Borough of Stockport had effectively run out of land, and was overflowing into abutting districts. In 1901, after petitioning the Local Government Board, Stockport expanded into several areas including the whole of Reddish, described by Arrowsmith as Stockport's "greatest prize". Stockport gained Reddish's tax income and building land, and in return Reddish received several civic amenities. A council school opened in 1907, and a combined fire station, free library, and baths opened in stages during 1908 (Cronin identifies a small building at the rear as a mortuary). The council opened new municipal parks at Mid Reddish (on land presented by Houldsworth) and at South Reddish. A park at North Reddish followed, described in 1932 as "recently laid out, provid(ing) a number of horticultural features combined with recreation facilities, and illustrat(ing) the layout of a modern recreation park". At that time, the Stockport Canal and the Reddish Iron Works made up two of the park's boundaries.

The separate civil parish was merged into Stockport parish on 1 April 1935. In 1931, the parish had a population of 15,463. Reddish's position north of the Tame means it was historically part of Lancashire. On the merger with Stockport in 1901, the boundary between Lancashire and Cheshire was moved to place it in Cheshire. In 1974 Stockport and several adjacient territories became a unified metropolitan borough in the newly created metropolitan county of Greater Manchester.

== Parliamentary representation ==
Reddish is currently served by the parliamentary constituency of Stockport, represented by Labour MP Navendu Mishra since the 2024 United Kingdom general election. Prior to this, the parliamentary constituency of Denton and Reddish had been represented by Labour MP Andrew Gwynne from 2005 until the constituency was abolished in 2024. At the 2010 general election, Gwynne got 51% of votes and the second-placed Conservative candidate 25%. The seat had been held by Labour since its creation in 1983.

=== Council representation ===
Reddish is divided into two wards, Reddish North and Reddish South, for the purpose of electing councillors to Stockport Metropolitan Borough Council. Each ward returns three councillors.

As of May 2020, Roy Driver, David Wilson and Kate Butler (all Labour) represent Reddish North; Janet Mobbs, Jude Wells (both Labour) and Gary Lawson (Green) represent Reddish South. The 2021 local election saw Reddish South's first independent candidate, Daniel Zieba, who came fourth, beating the Liberal Democrats.

== Geography ==
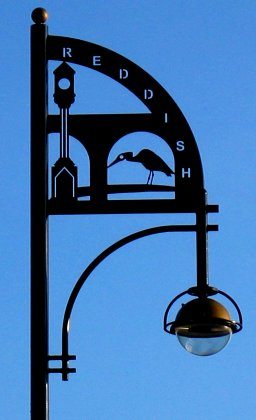
A lamp standard near Houldsworth square. It pictures the herons commonly seen in Reddish Vale, the railway viaduct and the clock monument to Sir William Houldsworth

Reddish borders Heaton Chapel, Heaton Norris and Brinnington of Stockport; Denton of Tameside; and Gorton and Levenshulme of the City of Manchester.

Reddish is a densely populated area and is near to affluent parts of Greater Manchester, such as Heaton Chapel and Heaton Moor. It continues to be an attraction to many people in the Greater Manchester area to work, live and relax.

=== Climate ===
Reddish has a mild climate. The main population is situated along a linear stretch parallel with Reddish Vale. Reddish Vale and the lower lying land in the valley is often cooler and effectively a 'frost pocket'. It is still mild comparatively speaking; temperatures on a clear night will likely be colder than the land at the top of valley floor or, roughly speaking, along Reddish Road/Gorton Road. The effects of a Fohn Wind are often present here, where the warm air rises from the valley floor, tempering the air at the top and thereby reducing overnight lows, more particularly in winter.

As a comparison, temperatures on any given clear night throughout the year can be between 1-3 degrees C warmer than the Manchester weather station, situated at the nearby Woodford Aerodrome, but on a cloudy night are almost equal. Daytime highs are similar and predominately almost exacting to Woodford, though fluctuations due to localised weather patterns can produce variations.

Again, on a cloudy day, the temperatures can be slightly cooler than Woodford. Dependent on the prevailing weather patterns and the wind direction, temperatures can be either lower by around 1 degree C and occasionally (more noticeably on a warm sunny day) and in the absence of early morning mist/fogs(common in Woodford and Reddish Vale) can be up to 2 degrees C warmer than Woodford.

Due to its suburban nature and geographical location, close to the municipal centres of Stockport and Manchester, it benefits from an 'urban heat island' effect.

Most of Reddish would be equivalent to Usda Zone 8B/9A in recent years and, with the influence of global warming, with typical annual minimum lows of around -5/-6C.

Summer high temperatures average around 20-21C and peak at around 28C in any given year, occasionally to around 32C. Overnight lows average around 12-14C typically.

Winter high temperatures average around 6-9C. Winter overnight lows typically average around 3C.

Many tender plants can grow here and in the Stockport/Manchester area in general; the municipal planting consists of much New Zealand flora, such as Phormiums and Cordylines and Mediterranean plantings such as European Fan Palms and Canary Island date palms and Yuccas in residential gardens are commonplace.

Weather data specifically for South Reddish can be found here: https://web.archive.org/web/20110710210003/http://www.everyoneweb.com/palmsnexotics/

== Demography ==
Population
Year	Pop.	±% p.a.
1774	302	—
1811	456	+1.12%
1821	574	+2.33%
1831	860	+4.13%
1841	1,188	+3.28%
1851	1,218	+0.25%
1861	1,363	+1.13%
1901	8,668	+4.73%
1911	14,252	+5.10%

White British is the predominant ethnicity. For the North Reddish ward, just under 97% of the population of 16,120 were identified as white (including Irish and other white), 1.48% as mixed-race, 0.73% as black, 0.6% as Chinese and 0.43% as Asian. For the South Reddish ward, just under 96% of the population of 13,935 were identified as White, 1.28% as mixed race, 1.28% as Asian, 0.86% as Black and 0.84% as Chinese.

The housing stock remains mainly terraced and semi-detached. For the North Reddish ward, the 6,914 housing units were divided into 8% detached house, 46% semi-detached, 36% terraced and 10% flats. For the South Reddish ward, the 6,598 housing units were divided into 5% detached house, 29% semi-detached, 44% terraced and 22% flats. There are no tower blocks in Reddish, unlike several neighbouring areas.

Some housing built by factory owners for their employees remains. Greg Street, Birkdale Road and Broadstone Hall Road South have mid-19th century terraces built by the Gregs for the workers at their, now demolished, Victoria and Albert Mills. Furnival Street was built in 1886 to house workers at the (demolished) Furnival's ironworks The largest collection is that built by Houldsworth near to his Reddish Mill, even though only Liverpool Street and Houldsworth Street remain after clearance in about 1974. The houses on Houldsworth Street, directly facing the mill, are grander and would have been for the higher placed workers.

== Economy ==
The shopping area around Houldsworth Square contains about eighty small shops and has been chosen as one of eight areas to benefit from the Agora Project, an EU-funded project to reverse the decline in local shopping areas.

A large £350 data center has been proposed, which is heavily contested.

Stockport MBC describes Reddish as one of the eight major district centres in the borough that offer "local history, modern convenient facilities and traditional high street retailing". The other seven are Bramhall, Cheadle, Cheadle Hulme, Edgeley, Hazel Grove, Marple and Romiley.

Reddish is home to many tertiary services. Houldsworth Square, named after local Victorian era mill-owner William Houldsworth), has many shops and banks serving the local population. There are schools, such as Reddish Vale High School in South Reddish, which in 2006 became the only school in Greater Manchester to be announced by the Government as a 'Trust Pathfinder' school. In 2014, the school was judged by OFSTED as "an inadequate school" and was later put into special measures.

=== Affluence ===
There are several measures of overall wealth and poverty. The Human Poverty Index calculates a value based on longevity, literacy, unemployment and income. High values indicate increasing poverty. The parliamentary constituency scores 14.4, close to the UK average of 14.8. This compares well with neighbours Manchester Gorton (20.5) and Stockport (14.2), but poorly with the other Stockport constituencies of Hazel Grove (10.9) and Cheadle, placed third best in the UK with a value of 7.9.

On a narrower level, the estimated household weekly income for the period April 2001 to March 2002 for North and South Reddish wards was £440 and £400 respectively. In comparison with nearby wards, this is higher than Gorton North, Gorton South and Brinnington (at £350, £330 and £340 respectively), slightly lower than Denton West (£480) and significantly lower than Heaton Moor and Heaton Mersey (£590). The averages for the North-West region and the UK were £489 and £554 respectively (2001–4).

== Landmarks ==
Reddish is home to several listed buildings and structures. All the Grade I and Grade II* listings are part of Houldsworth's community.

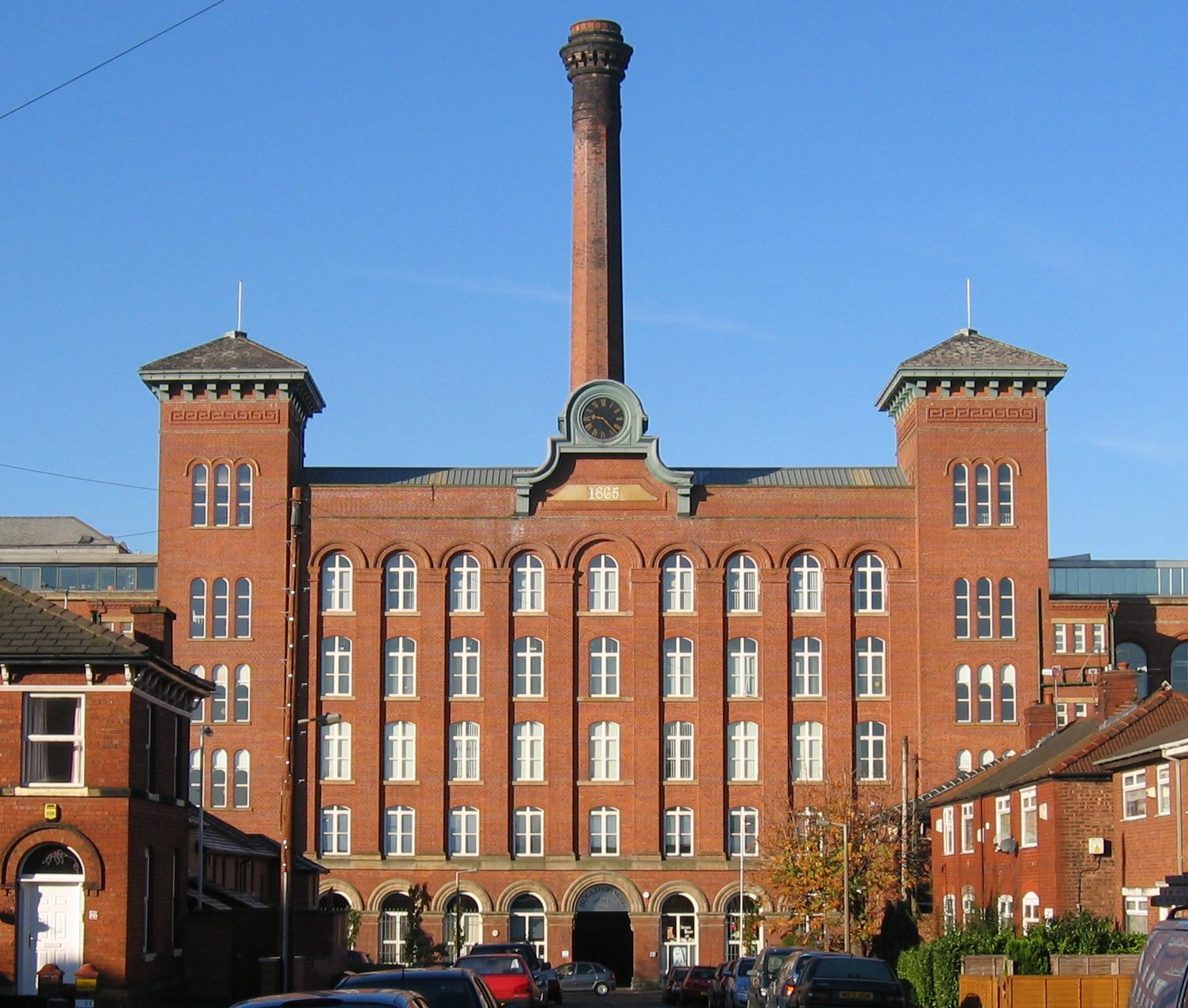
Houldsworth Mill in 2006

- Grade I

- St Elisabeth's Church and wall at St Elisabeth's Church (Grade II*)

- Grade II*

- Houldsworth Mill, Houldsworth Street. Designed by Abraham Henthorn Stott. Opened in 1860s, closed as a cotton mill in 1958.
- Houldsworth Working Men's Club, Leamington Road. Designed by Abraham Henthorn Stott. Opened on 16 May 1874.
- St Elisabeth's C of E Primary School (Houldsworth School), Liverpool Street. Wall at St Elisabeth's C of E Primary School, Liverpool Street. Designed by Alfred Waterhouse. Consecrated in 1883.
- St Elisabeth's Church Rectory and wall at St Elisabeth's Church Rectory, Liverpool Street. Designed by Alfred Waterhouse.

- Grade II

- Broadstone Mill House, Broadstone Road
- Clock and drinking fountain, Houldsworth Square
- North Reddish Infant & Junior School, Lewis Road
- Tame Viaduct, Reddish Vale
- 40 Sandy Lane
- Shoresfold Farmhouse and numbers 2 and 4 Marbury Road

- Locally listed

- Bull's Head Building, formerly the Bull's Head pub, Gorton Road. Now occupied by Manchester Vacs, a retailer and repairer of vacuum cleaners.

== Transport ==
=== Buses ===
The B6167 was designated a Quality Bus Corridor in 2004 and a number of modifications made. As of 2006, any improvements have not been quantified. The main bus route is the high frequency service 203 operated by Stagecoach Manchester, which runs from Stockport via Reddish and Gorton to Manchester city centre. Less-frequent services run to Ashton via Gorton & Droylsden; Ashton via Denton; Manchester via Didsbury and Rusholme; Hazel Grove; and Wythenshawe.

=== Canal ===
The Ashton Canal and the Stockport Branch Canal were built to join Manchester and Stockport to the coal mines in Oldham and Ashton-under-Lyne. The branch was dependent on the main for its utility, and hence its planning, passing through parliament, and construction came after that of the main. The main opened in 1796 and the branch in 1796. The branch was just under five miles (8 km) long; it left the Ashton Canal at Clayton, passed through Gorton & Reddish and terminated just over the boundary in Heaton Norris, adjacent to what was then the main turnpike between Manchester and Stockport.

The Beat Bank Branch Canal was planned as a sub-branch and was intended to cross Reddish Vale to a colliery at Denton, but the scheme was abandoned by 1798. By 1827, the canal was bringing coal to Stockport from as far as Norbury and Poynton.

The canal was purchased by the Manchester, Sheffield and Lincolnshire Railway in 1848. Traffic declined and the canal was described as derelict as early as 1922. Commercial traffic ceased in the 1930s; the canal was declared officially closed in 1962 and filled in.

=== Roads ===
The B6167 is the main road through Reddish; it allows access to the A57 for Manchester or the M60/M67 junction at the north, and to Stockport and the M60 to the south. The road, currently designated Sandy Lane, Reddish Road, Gorton Road and Reddish Lane, was turnpiked by the Manchester, Denton and Stockport Trust following the Manchester and Hyde Turnpike Road Act 1818 (58 Geo. 3. c. vi).

=== Railway ===
Northern Trains operates services from two local railway stations:

- Reddish North lies on the Hope Valley Line, which connects Sheffield, New Mills Central and Manchester Piccadilly. Services are generally half-hourly on Mondays to Saturdays, but hourly on Sundays.
- Reddish South has a weekly return parliamentary service on Saturday mornings, running between Stockport, Guide Bridge and Stalybridge.

Reddish Electric Depot maintained electric locomotives and multiple units for the Woodhead Line from 1954; these operated services between Manchester London Road, Hadfield and Sheffield Victoria. It was closed in 1981, along with the majority of the route. The site has since been redeveloped as a housing estate.

== Education ==
Reddish's only secondary school is Reddish Vale High School. Sited on the edge of the green belt, the school has its own farm and is characterised by OFSTED as "an inadequate school" as of 2014. It teaches about 1,400 pupils from the ages of 11 to 16, but does not have a sixth form.

As of 2007, Reddish has ten nursery and primary schools, including some church schools (Roman Catholic and Church of England). It has been proposed to close three of these and build a new school. The site chosen was formerly a clay pit for a brickworks and later a landfill site. Much of the landfill took place before modern controls and there is local concern about the suitability of the site.

== Community facilities ==
Of the 1907 facilities provided by Stockport, only the library is still open. The baths closed in 2005; there is a campaign to reopen them, but it does not have the backing of the council. The ground floor of the fire station is used as a community centre. The mortuary closed in the 1980s.

== Religion ==
Reddish falls in the Diocese of Manchester for the Church of England, and the Diocese of Salford for the Roman Catholic Church.

- St Agnes, Gorton Road; (Church of England). 1908, brick, some good glass.
- Bethel Christian Centre/Reddish Community Church/Bethel Apostolic Church, Sykes Street; (Apostolic Church).
- Christ Church, Lillian Grove; (Methodist/United Reformed Church).
- St Elisabeth, Lemington Road; (Anglo-Catholic - Church of England); 1883 Victorian Gothic building by Alfred Waterhouse. Paid for by Houldsworth
- Holy Family, Thornley Lane North; (Roman Catholic).
- St Joseph, Gorton Road (Roman Catholic).
- St Mary, Reddish Road; (Church of England). Reddish's first church, built 1862-4 at a cost of £2500 in the "decorated English style".
- Reddish Christian Fellowship, Broadstone Road; sited in an end-of-terrace house.
- Stockport Seventh-day Adventist Church, Coronation Street; (Seventh-day Adventist Church); modern building.
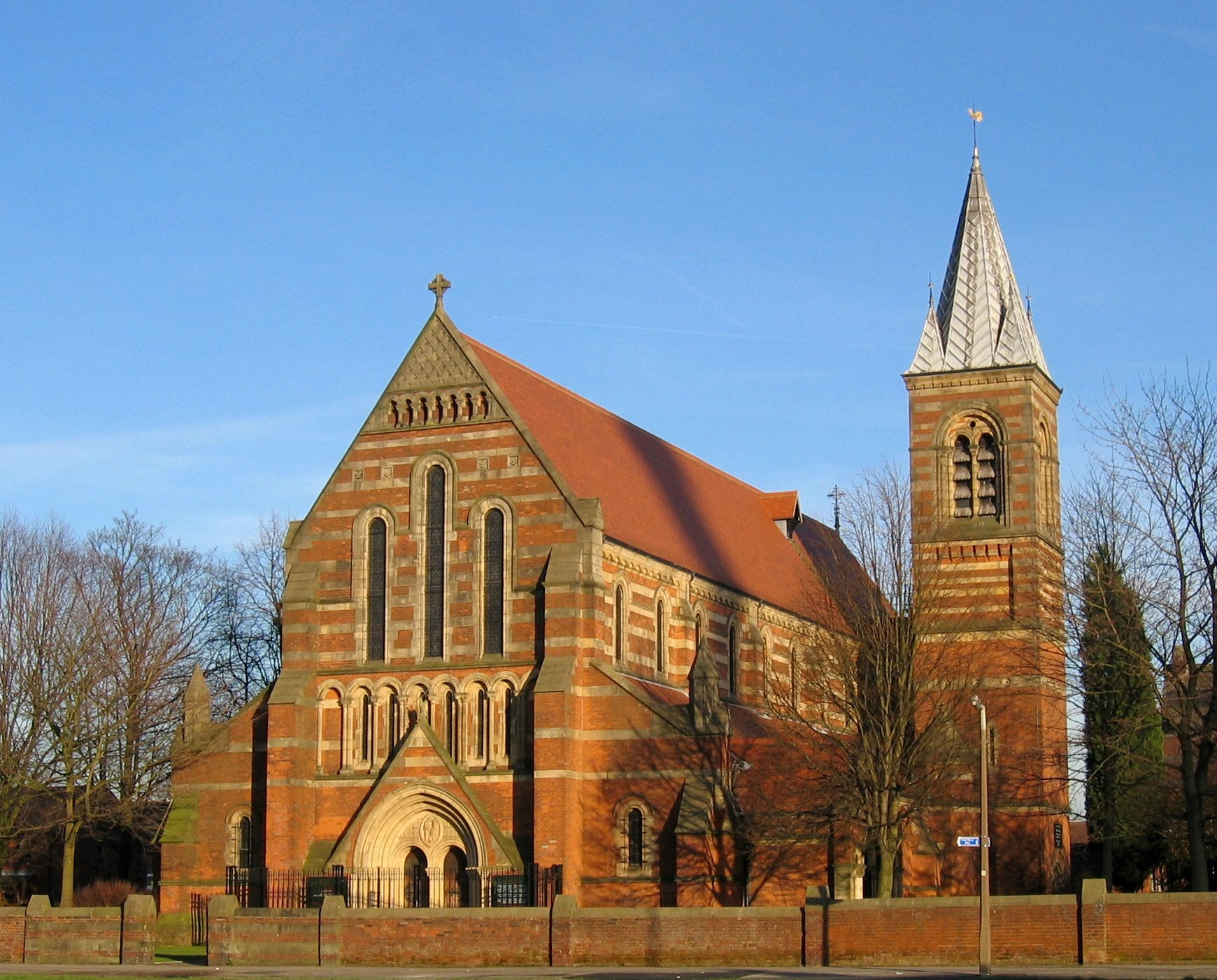
St Elisabeth's Church. The shadow across the roof is cast by the chimney from the nearby Houldsworth Mill, 2007

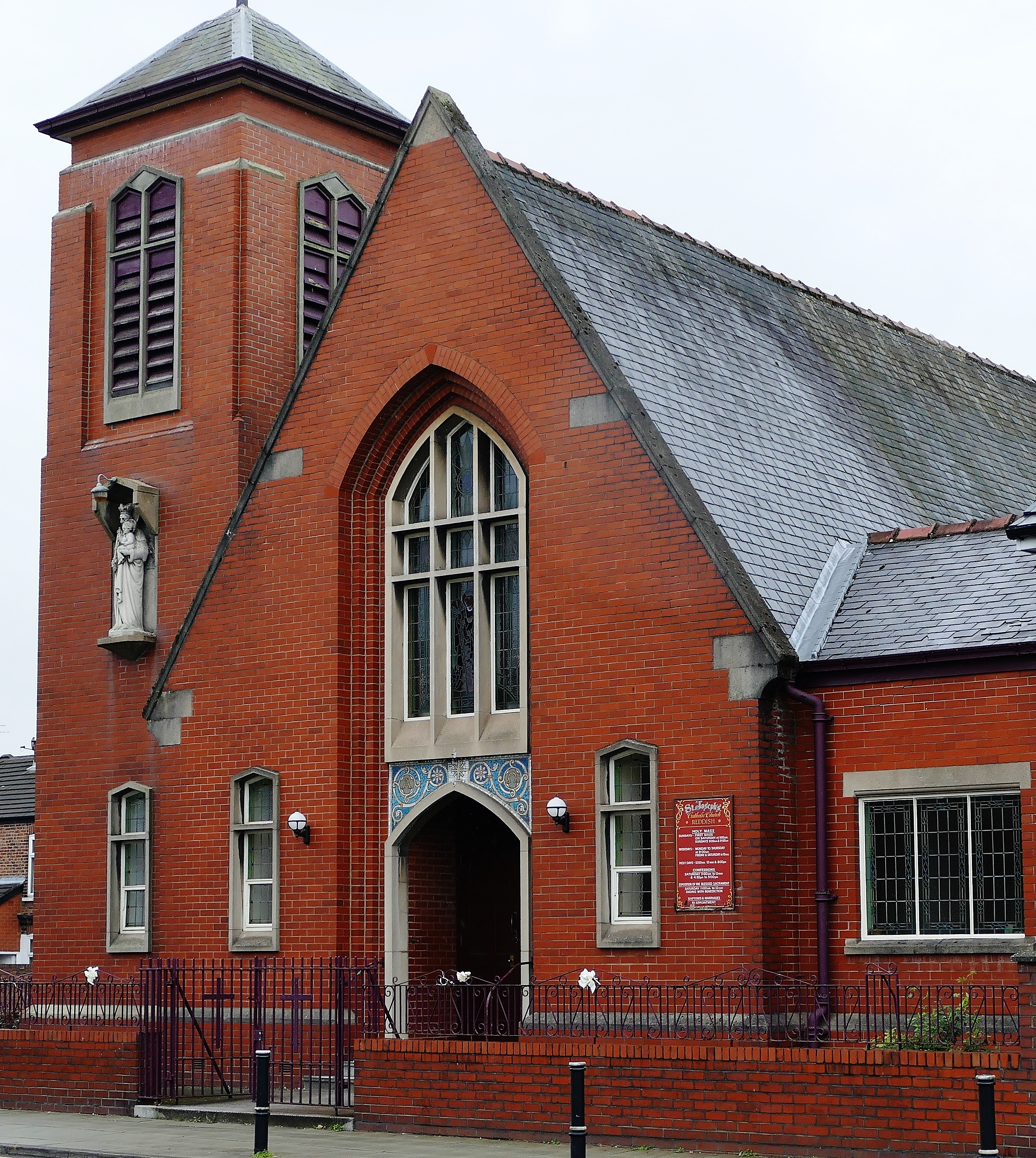
St Joseph's Church in 2018

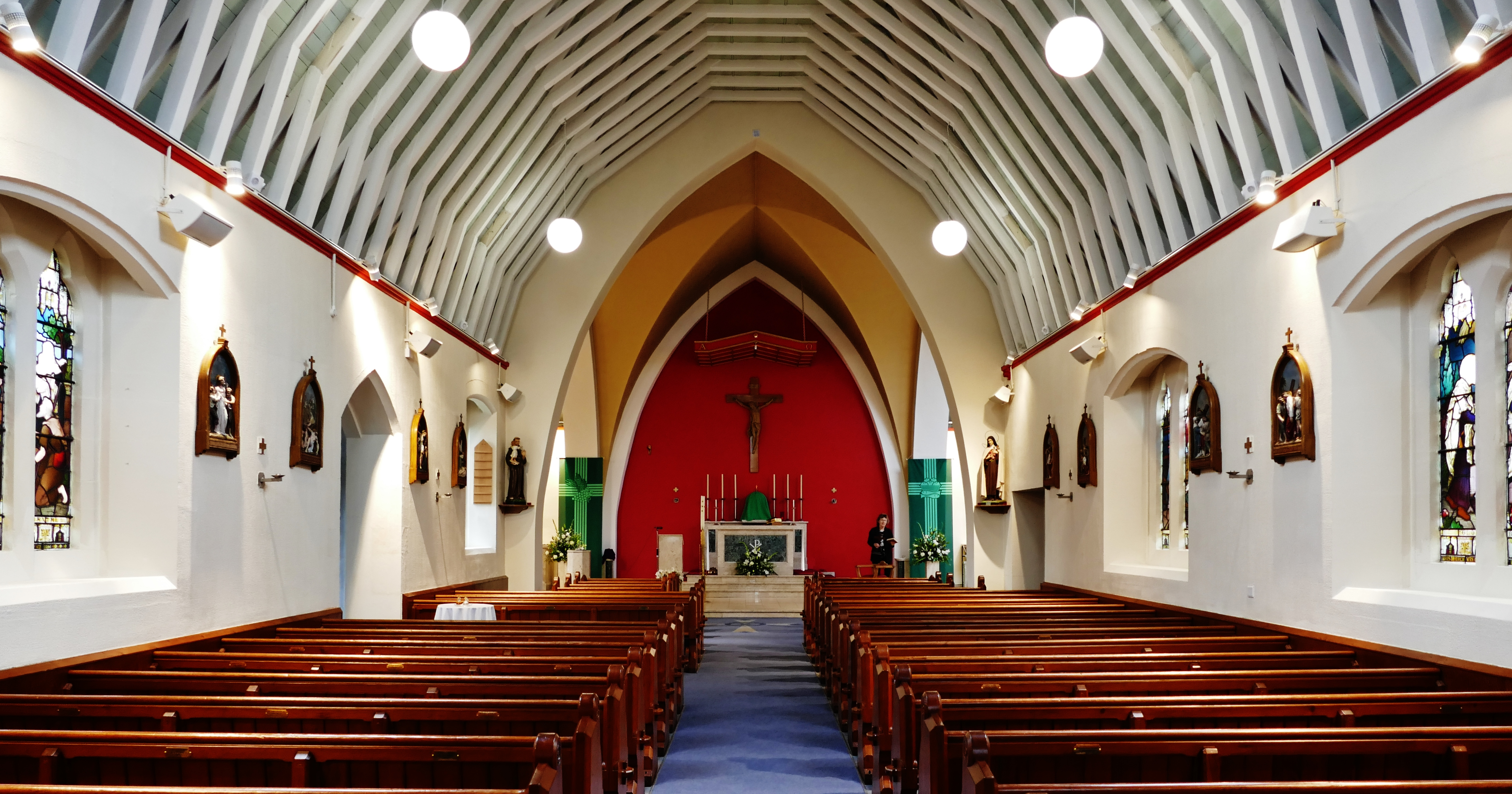
St Joseph's Church interior, 2018

== Notable people ==
- Norman Foster was born in Reddish in 1935 and went on to study architecture at the University of Manchester. Foster is one of the leading architects in the world and is noted for buildings including 30 St Mary Axe, the new Wembley Stadium, Hearst Tower, Torre Caja Madrid and Deutsche Bank Place. His work under-construction includes APIIC Tower, Hermitage Plaza, the new Camp Nou stadium, home of FC Barcelona and 200 Greenwich Street, the second tower of the World Trade Center in Lower Manhattan.
- Paul Morley, music journalist, critic and author of The North (And Almost Everything in It) grew up in Reddish.
- David Carr, incorrectly believed (due to a mix-up in samples) to have been the first human to contract AIDS, was born in Reddish.
- Clifford Poole, who worked as a music educator and composer in Ontario, Canada, was born in Reddish.

== See also ==
- Listed buildings in Stockport
