= River Tame =

River Tame is a Celtic river name, used in England to refer to:

- River Tame, Greater Manchester, a river that meets the Goyt to form the Mersey
- River Tame, West Midlands, the largest tributary of the Trent
- River Tame, North Yorkshire, a tributary of the Leven and then the Tees

== See also ==
- River Tamar, a river that forms part of the border between Devon and Cornwall
- River Thame, a river that flows through Buckinghamshire and Oxfordshire, a tributary of the Thames
- River Thames, a river that flows through Oxford, Reading, and London
