= Reddish Vale High School =

School in Reddish, Stockport, England

Coordinates: 53°26′15″N 2°09′10″W

- Reddish Vale Road, Reddish, Stockport, Greater Manchester, SK5 7HD; England

Information
- Type: Academy, Comprehensive
- Mottoes: Reach Higher Respect Aspiration Determination Independence
- Local authority: Stockport
- Trust: South Manchester Learning Trust
- Department for Education URN: 145133 Tables
- Ofsted: Reports
- Gender: Coeducational
- Age: 11 to 16
- Enrolment: 874
- Website: www.reddish.stockport.sch.uk

Reddish Vale High School, formerly Reddish Vale Technology College is a secondary school in Stockport, Greater Manchester, England. It is a coeducational school with academy status, part of South Manchester academy trust, educating 1027 pupils in the 11-16 range.

== Description ==
The school facilities include a sports hall, gym, astro turf pitch, tennis courts, purpose built performing arts block, library, farm and swimming pool. The school also offers specialist classrooms in the areas of cooking and nutrition, art and design, performing arts, science and computing.

It has been awarded the Artsmark Gold Award from the Arts Council of England. A 2006 OFSTED report summarized it as "a good school".

The school achieved its best GCSE results in the summers of 2016 and 2017; becoming the most improved school in Stockport in 2016.

In June 2024 the school was subject to an OFSTED inspection that judged both the 'Quality of Education' and 'Leadership and Management' as Inadequate, noting that "The school, and those responsible for governance, have overseen a decline in the quality of education that pupils receive" - and the school was put into Special Measures.

== Governance ==
Reddish Vale became a specialist Technology College in 1995, being one of the first LEA schools in the country to do so. It was the first school in the United Kingdom to adopt the Co-operative College's co-operative -based model for trust school governance in 2007. Within a year, a further 25 schools adopted the model as one offering strong values and extensive engagement of all stakeholders within the learning community.
