= Nico Ditch =

Earthwork in England

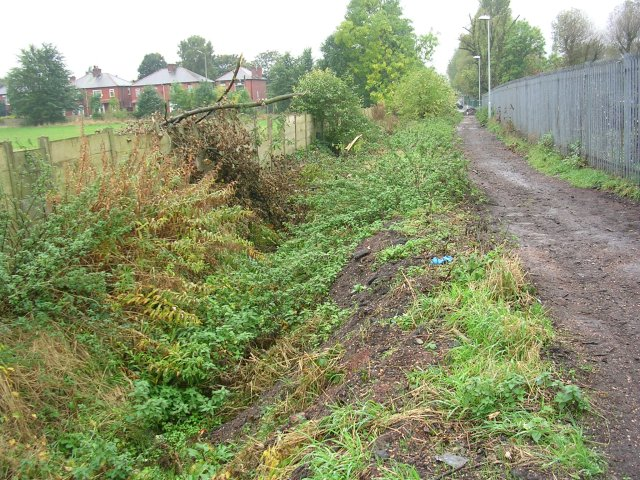
- Nico Ditch running west near Levenshulme in 2005
- Interactive map of Nico Ditch
- Location: Greater Manchester, England
- Coordinates: 53.4508°N 2.1769°W
- Designer: Anglo-Saxons
- Type: Ditch and earthwork
- Length: 6 mi (9.7 km)
- Width: 4–5 yards (3.7–4.6 m)
- Completion date: 5th–11th century
- Dismantled date: Large sections lost to urban expansion

Nico Ditch is a six-mile (9.7 km) long linear earthwork between Ashton-under-Lyne and Stretford in Greater Manchester, England. It was dug as a defensive fortification, or possibly a boundary marker, between the 5th and 11th century. The ditch is still visible in short sections, such as a 330-yard (300 m) stretch in Denton Golf Course. For the parts which survived, the ditch is 4–5 yards (3.7–4.6 m) wide and up to 5 feet (1.5 m) deep. Part of the earthwork is protected as a Scheduled Ancient Monument.

== Etymology ==
The earliest documented reference to the ditch is in a charter detailing the granting of land in Audenshaw to the monks of the Kersal Cell. In the document, dating from 1190 to 1212, the ditch is referred to as "Mykelldiche", and a magnum fossatum, which is Latin for "large ditch".

The name Nico (sometimes Nikker) for the ditch became established in the 19th and 20th century. It may have been derived from the Anglo-Saxon Hnickar, a water spirit who seized and drowned unwary travellers, but the modern name is most likely a corruption of the name Mykelldiche and its variations; this is because the Anglo-Saxon word micel means "big" or "great", harking back to the early 13th century description of the ditch as magnum fossatum. An alternative derivation of Nico comes from nǽcan, an Anglo-Saxon verb meaning "kill".

== Course ==
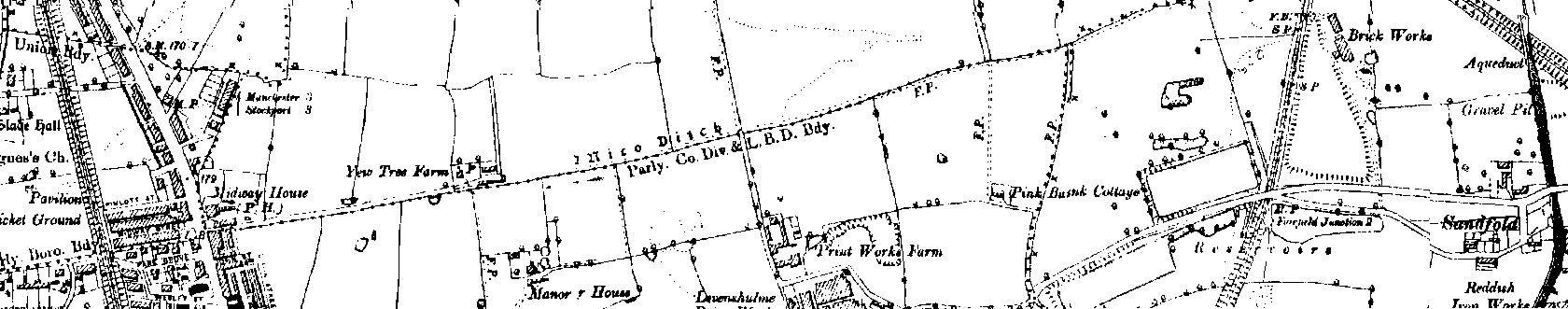
An 1895 map showing Nico Ditch between Reddish and Slade Hall in Longsight.

Nico Ditch stretches 6 mi (9.7 km) between Ashton Moss (grid reference SJ909980) in Ashton-under-Lyne and Hough Moss (grid reference SJ82819491), which is just east of Stretford. It passes through Denton, Reddish, Gorton, Levenshulme, Burnage, Rusholme, Platt Fields Park in Fallowfield, Withington and Chorlton-cum-Hardy, crossing four metropolitan boroughs of present-day Greater Manchester. The ditch coincides with the boundaries between the boroughs of Stockport and Manchester, and between Tameside and Manchester; it reaches as far as the Denton golf course. A section is now beneath the Audenshaw Reservoirs, which were built towards the end of the 19th century. The ditch may have extended west beyond Stretford, to Urmston (grid reference SJ78299504).

== History ==
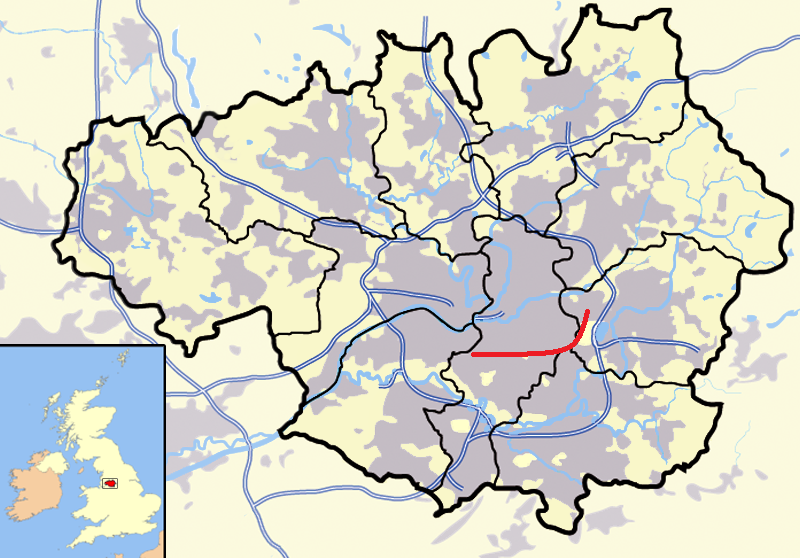
Approximate course of Nico Ditch, shown in red. It may have extended further to the west than indicated, after a gap necessitated by mossland in its path.

The earthwork was constructed some time between the end of Roman rule in Britain in the early 5th century and the Norman conquest in 1066. Its original purpose is unclear, but it may have been used as a defensive fortification or as an administrative boundary. It possibly marked a 7th-century boundary for the expansionist Anglo-Saxons, or it may have been a late 8th or early 9th century boundary marker between the kingdoms of Mercia and Northumbria. In the early medieval period, the Anglo-Saxon kingdoms of Northumbria, Mercia, and Wessex struggled for control over North West England, along with the Britons and the Danes. Whatever its earlier use, the ditch has been used as a boundary since at least the Middle Ages.

Legend has it that Nico Ditch was completed in a single night by the inhabitants of Manchester, as a protection against Viking invaders in 869–870; Manchester may have been sacked by the Danes in 870. It was said that each man had an allocated area to construct, and was required to dig his section of the ditch and build a bank equal to his own height. According to 19th-century folklore, the ditch was the site of a battle between Saxons and Danes. The battle was supposed to have given the nearby towns of Gorton and Reddish their names, from "Gore Town" and "Red-Ditch", respectively, but the idea has been dismissed by historians as a "popular fancy". The names derive from "dirty farmstead" and "reedy ditch," respectively.

Antiquarians and historians have been interested in the ditch since the 19th century, but much of its course has been built over. Between 1990 and 1997, the University of Manchester Archaeological Unit excavated sections of the ditch in Denton, Reddish, Levenshulme, and Platt Fields, in an attempt to determine its age and purpose. Although no date was established for the ditch's construction, the investigations revealed that the bank to the north of the ditch is of 20th century origin. Together with the ditch's profile, which is U-shaped rather than the V-shape typically used in military ditches and defences, this suggests that the purpose of the earthwork was to mark a territorial boundary. The conclusion of the project was that the ditch was probably a boundary marker.

== Preservation ==
Despite heavy weathering, the ditch is still visible in short sections, which can be up to 4–5 yards (3.7–4.6 m) wide and up to 5 feet (1.5 m) deep. A 330-yard (300 m) stretch through Denton Golf Course, and a section running through Platt Fields Park, are considered the best preserved remains. In 1997, a 150-yard (140 m) segment of the ditch in Platt Fields was protected as a Scheduled Ancient Monument. The rest of the ditch remains unprotected.

== See also ==
- History of Manchester
- Scheduled Monuments in Greater Manchester
