= Brinnington =

Suburb of Stockport, in Greater Manchester, England

Coordinates: 53.435°N 2.135°W

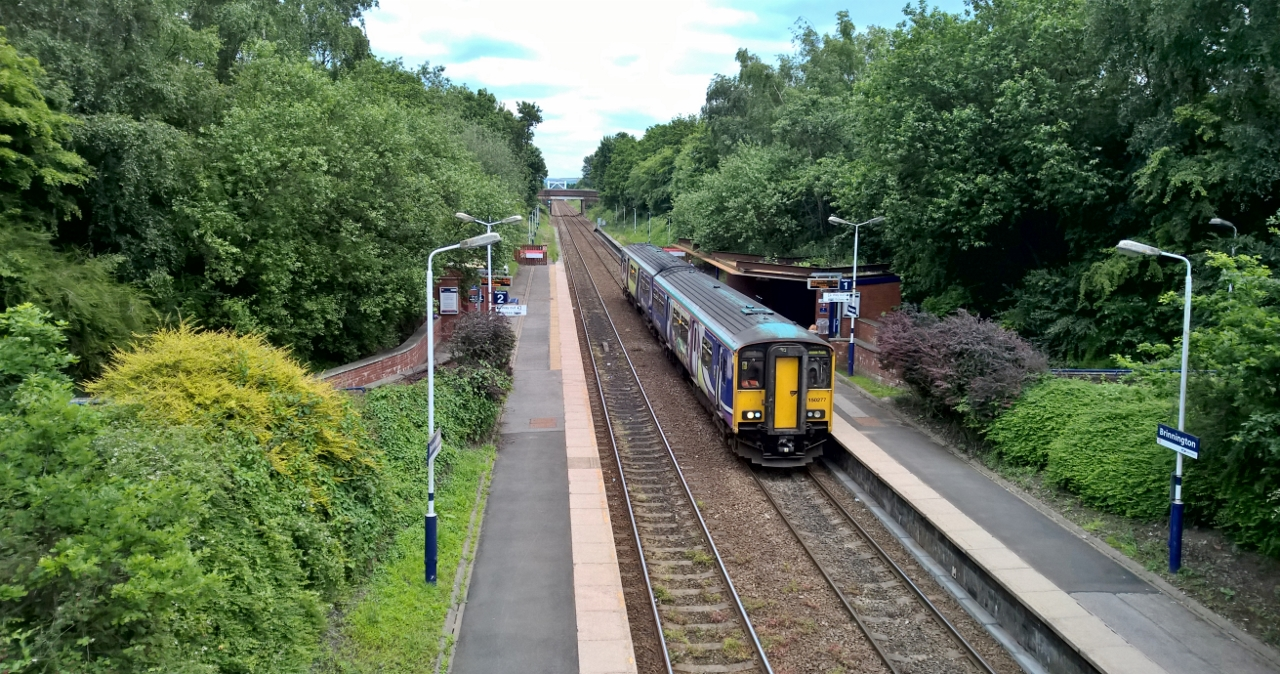
- A diesel multiple unit calls at Brinnington railway station in 2015

- Location within Greater Manchester
- Population: 7,061
- OS grid reference: SJ910926
- Metropolitan borough: Stockport
- Metropolitan county: Greater Manchester
- Region: North West
- Country: England
- Sovereign state: United Kingdom
- Post town: STOCKPORT
- Postcode district: SK5
- Dialling code: 0161
- Police: Greater Manchester
- Fire: Greater Manchester
- Ambulance: North West
- UK Parliament: Stockport

Brinnington is a north-eastern suburb of Stockport, in Greater Manchester, England. It lies on a bluff above a bend in the Tame Valley, between the M60 motorway and Reddish Vale Country Park.

== Description ==
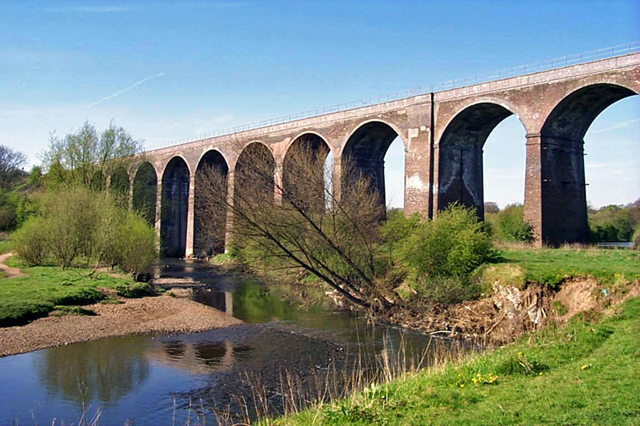
The viaduct spanning the River Tame at Reddish Vale in 2009

Brinnington was open farmland before the local authority housing developments of the 1950s and 1960s. To the west of Brinnington is Reddish Vale, a country park popular with families for walking, and exploring the ponds and brick viaducts; under the arches there is a sharp bend in the river and sand has been deposited giving the effect of a miniature beach.

The area consists mainly of council-owned dwellings including high rise flats. Brinnington has high crime levels and long-term unemployment at 20%. Two streets, Northumberland Road and Brinnington Road, were named by police as two of the three worst roads in north Stockport in 2010.

The area has undergone regeneration, including the demolition of the Top Shops site, replaced with 53 shared ownership houses and the First House community centre which opened in 2007. In 2009, 17 new homes were built at Lantern Close, a new road named after the annual lantern parade in the area.

== Toponymy ==
The name 'Brinnington' is derived from Old English. It means the farm (tun) called after Bryni (a personal name). The location of the farmstead is unknown.

== History ==
Brinnington is not named in the Domesday survey of 1086; it is believed to have been in the manor of Bredbury and probably became a barony of Stockport in the twelfth century.

From mid-14th century, the lords of the land were the Duckenfield family. Under the Duckenfields, the southern third of the township was held as a demesne named Portwood. By the 1540s, the family had a residence (Portwood Hall), a deer park and a corn mill. The northern part of the township was common moorland known as Brinnington Moor.

The area remained largely rural up until the 1950s. In 1754, only 15 families (104 individuals) were recorded. The population grew significantly throughout the 19th century, due to the development of nearby Portwood.

In the early 1780s, the manor was acquired by James Harrison, a Manchester cotton merchant who, in 1786, built a bridge between Portwood and Brinnington; in 1796, he built a millrace (Portwood Cut) to bring water power to the area. The population growth of the Brinnington area was driven by these developments and counted 5,331 individuals in 1841.

Since the council housing was built in the mid-20th century, the population naturally increased again as it transitioned from a rural to suburban area.

Brinnington was formerly a township in the parish of Stockport. In 1866, Brinnington became a separate civil parish; the parish was abolished on 30 September 1902 and merged with Bredbury. In 1901, the parish had a population of 502.

== Transport ==
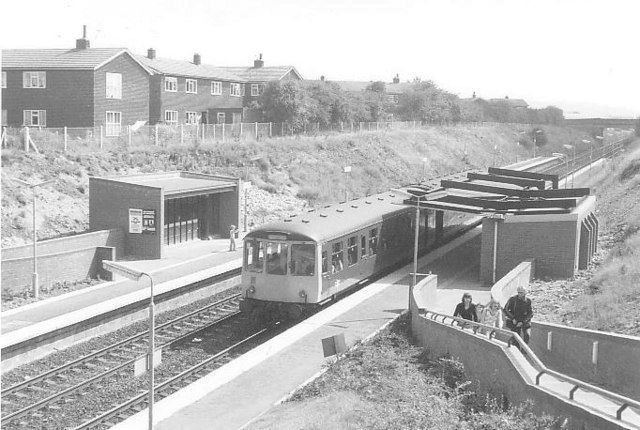
A diesel multiple unit at the station in 1977

Brinnington railway station is a stop on the Hope Valley Line; Northern Trains operates regular services between Manchester Piccadilly, New Mills Central and Sheffield.

The estate is accessed via Brinnington Road, which crosses the M60 motorway at both ends.

Bus services are operated by Stagecoach Manchester; key routes that serve Brinnington are:

- 322 runs between Stockport and Haughton Green
- 325 runs between Stockport and Brinnington, on a circular route
- 327 runs between Stockport and Denton.

== Religion ==
There are two churches: St. Bernadette's (Roman Catholic) and Brinnington Community Church at the Lighthouse Centre (Evangelical).

== Education ==
There are three primary schools: St. Paul's (Church Of England), St. Bernadette's (Roman Catholic) and Westmorland; the latter is an amalgamation of the former Brindale, Maycroft and Tame Valley primary schools.

== Health ==
A survey was carried out by a local GP to investigate why the depression rate in Brinnington was 23.6%, compared with an average of 9.8% in the rest of England. His records concurred; out of his last 123 patients, 24% were seeking help with depression, a further 28% were having treatment and 16% had been previously. Since deprivation is the main driver of health inequalities in Stockport, people in Brinnington can expect to live 10 years less than people in more affluent areas in Stockport. Moreover, 10 to 15 more years of that already shorter life will be spent in ill health compared to years of illness in more affluent areas.

== Law ==
Hollow End Towers in Brinnington were the subject of one of the leading cases on the law of nuisance, Transco plc v Stockport Metropolitan BC.
