= North Reddish =

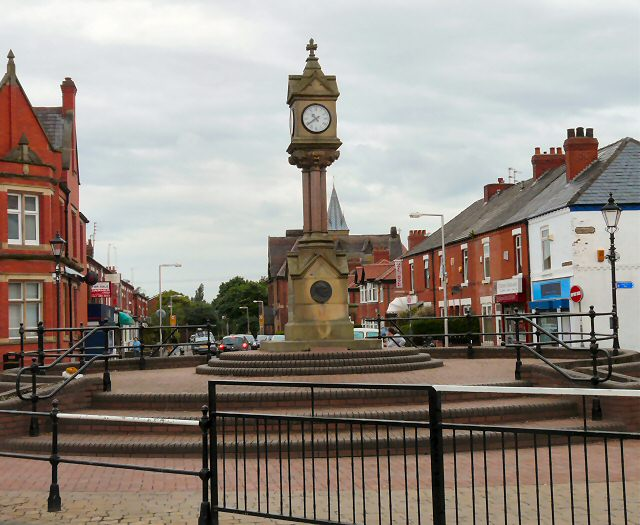
Houldsworth Square in Central Reddish, 2009

North Reddish is the northern part of Reddish, in Stockport, Greater Manchester, England.

North Reddish or Reddish North can refer to:

- A loosely defined geographical area covering the northern part of Reddish;
- A precisely defined ward named Reddish North that elects three councillors to Stockport Metropolitan Borough Council (SMBC); or
- A railway station in Reddish with commuter services to Manchester, Marple and Sheffield.
