= River Tame, Greater Manchester =

River in Greater Manchester, England

River Tame
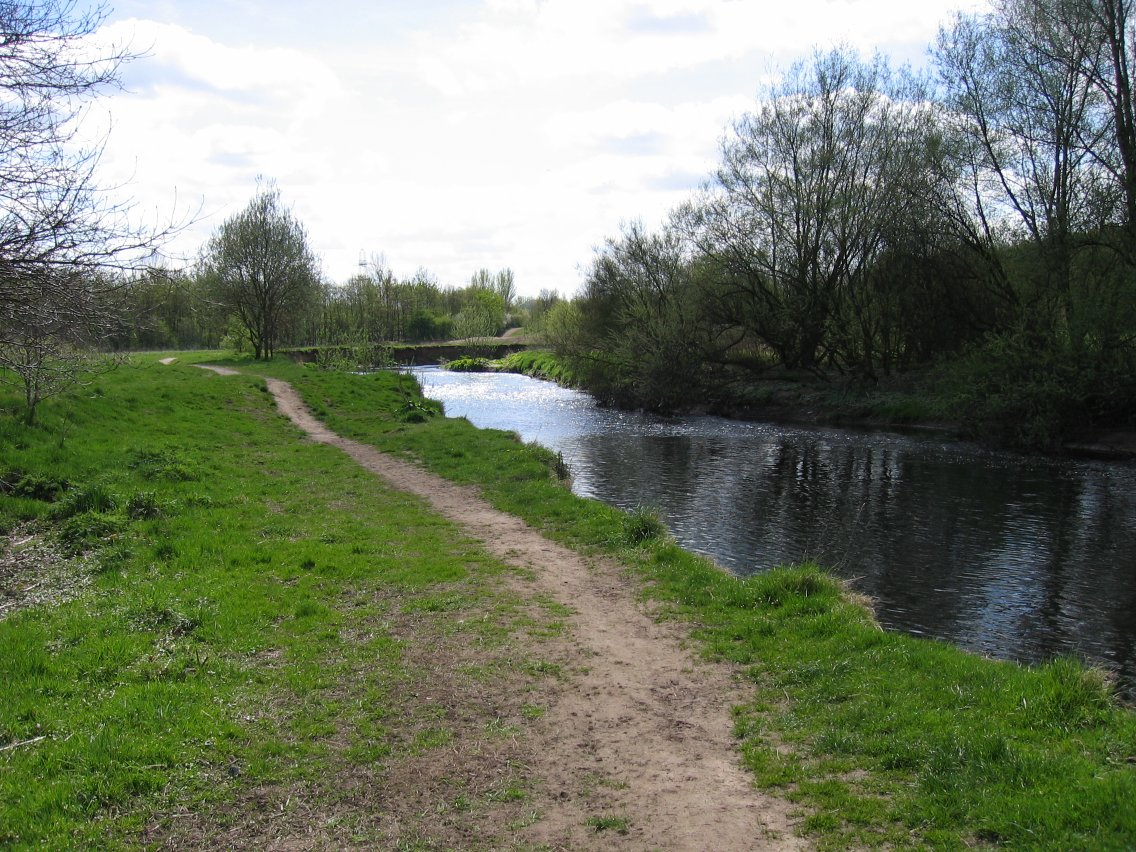
- River Tame in the Reddish Vale, 2006

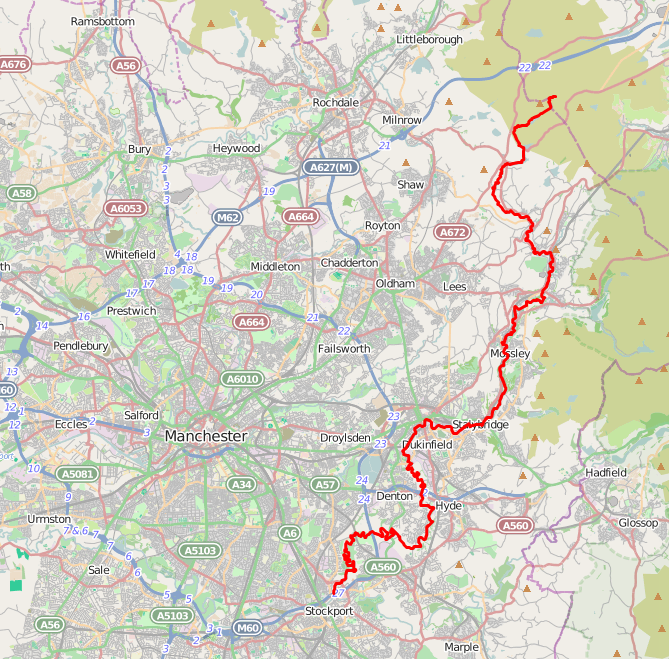
- The River Tame is highlighted in red Coordinates: 53.4142°N 2.15689°W

Location
- Country: England
- Region: Greater Manchester

Physical characteristics
- Source
  - location: west of Buckstones Moss, West Yorkshire
  - coordinates: 53.6187°N 2.0035°W
  - elevation: 473 m (1,552 ft)
- Mouth: River Mersey
  - location: Stockport
  - coordinates: 53.4143°N 2.1565°W
  - elevation: 40 m (130 ft)
- Length: 47.7 km (29.6 mi)
- Basin size: 146 km^{2} (56 sq mi)

Basin features
- River system: River Mersey

The River Tame flows through Greater Manchester, England. It rises on Denshaw Moor and flows to Stockport where it joins the River Goyt to form the River Mersey.

== Sources ==
The Tame rises on Denshaw Moor in Greater Manchester, close to the border with the modern metropolitan county of West Yorkshire but within the historic West Riding of Yorkshire.

== Course ==
Most of the river's catchment lies on the western flank of the Pennines. The named river starts as compensation flow (that is, a guaranteed minimum discharge) from Readycon Dean Reservoir in the moors above Denshaw. The source is a little further north, just over the county border in West Yorkshire, close to the Pennine Way. The highest point of the catchment is Greater Manchester's highest point at Black Chew Head.

The river flows generally south through Delph, Uppermill, Mossley, Stalybridge, Ashton-under-Lyne, Dukinfield, Haughton Green, Denton and Hyde. The Division Bridge (which spans the river at Mossley), marks the meeting point of the traditional boundaries of Lancashire, Yorkshire and Cheshire. The section through Stalybridge was once mooted as a diversion route for the restoration of the Huddersfield Narrow Canal although the canal was later de-culverted along a different route. At the end of its course, the confluence with the River Goyt forms the River Mersey at Stockport.

The 19th-century industrial concentrations in the above-named urban areas resulted in the Tame being a much polluted waterway. As well as industrial pollution from the dyes and bleaches used in textile mills, effluent from specialised paper-making cigarette papers, engineering effluents, including base metal washings from battery manufacture, phenols from the huge coal-gas plant in Denton, rain-wash from roads and abandoned coal spoil heaps there was also the sewage effluent from the surrounding population. Up to two-thirds of the river's flow at its confluence with the Goyt had passed through a sewage works. The anti-pollution efforts of the last thirty years of the 20th century resulted in the positive fauna distributions listed below.

The Centre for Ecology and Hydrology measures the flow at three points for the National River Flow Archive, at Portwood weir (Stockport) and at Broomstairs weir (Denton). Portwood weir is 1 1/4 miles (2 kilometres) above the confluence with the Mersey and contains the great majority of the final flow (with the exception of waste water from a concrete facility).

== Boundary line ==
The river has been a border from the earliest times between the Anglo-Saxon kingdoms of Northumbria and Mercia. For its course after the Division Bridge in Mossley the river marks much of the historical boundary dividing Cheshire and Lancashire.

== Mouth ==
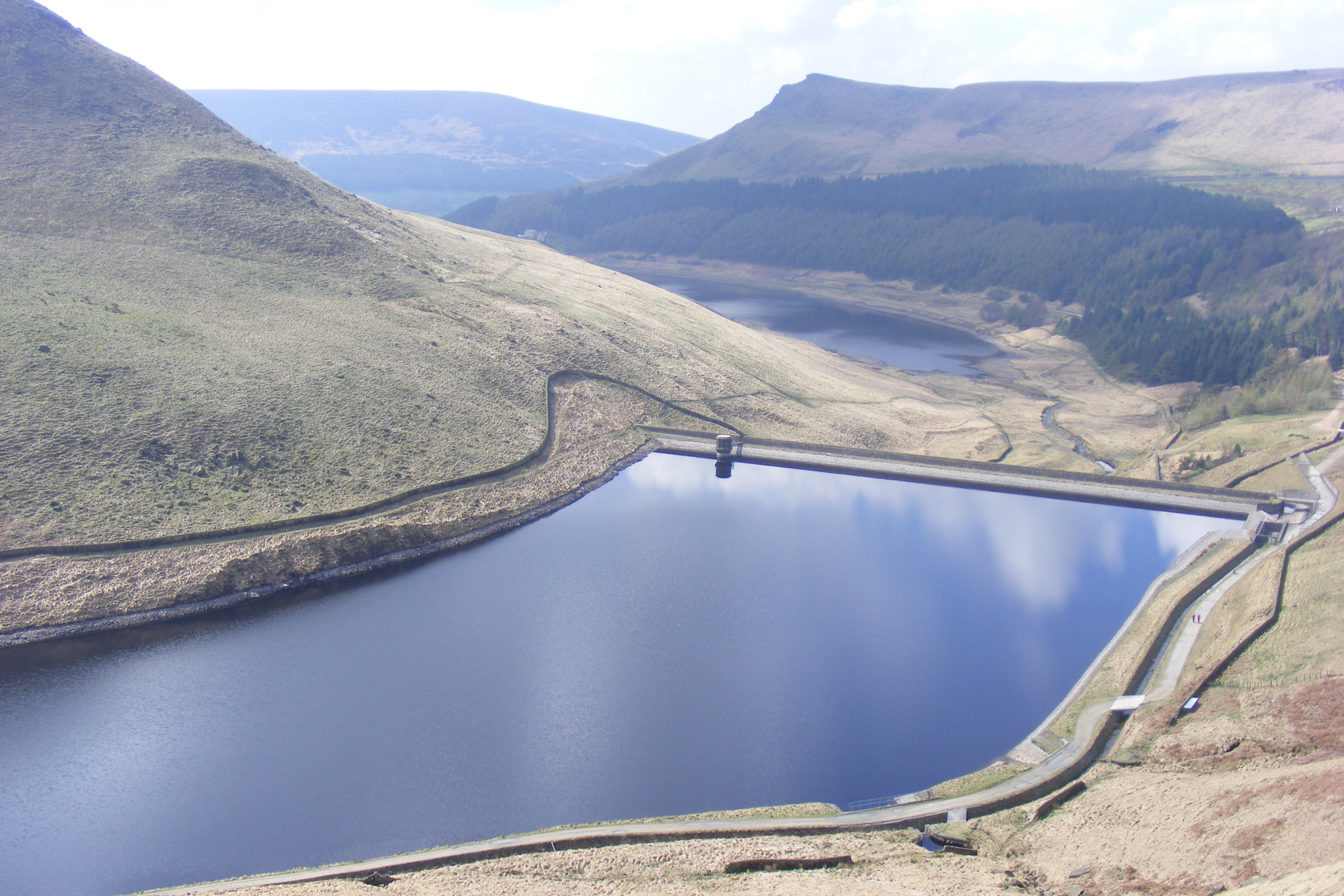
Greenfield Reservoir

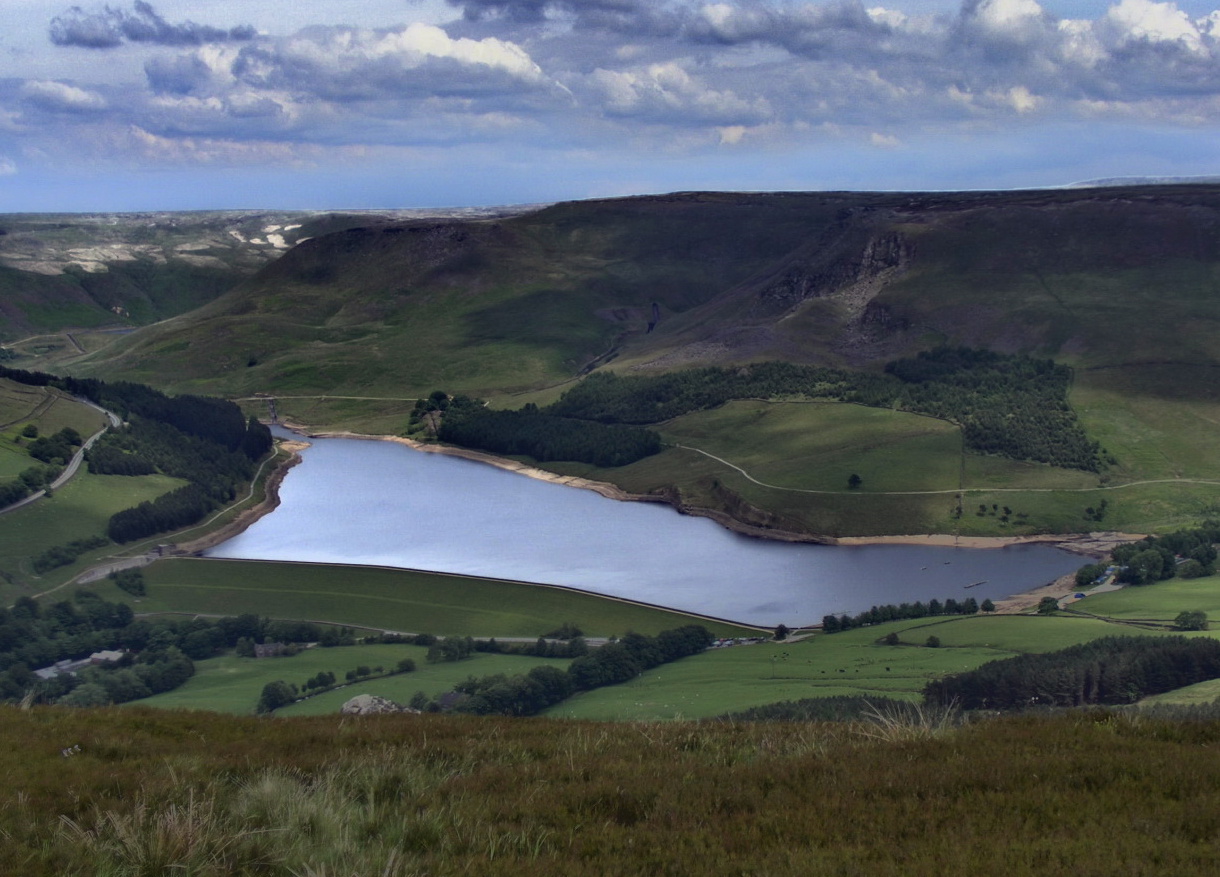
Dovestone Reservoir

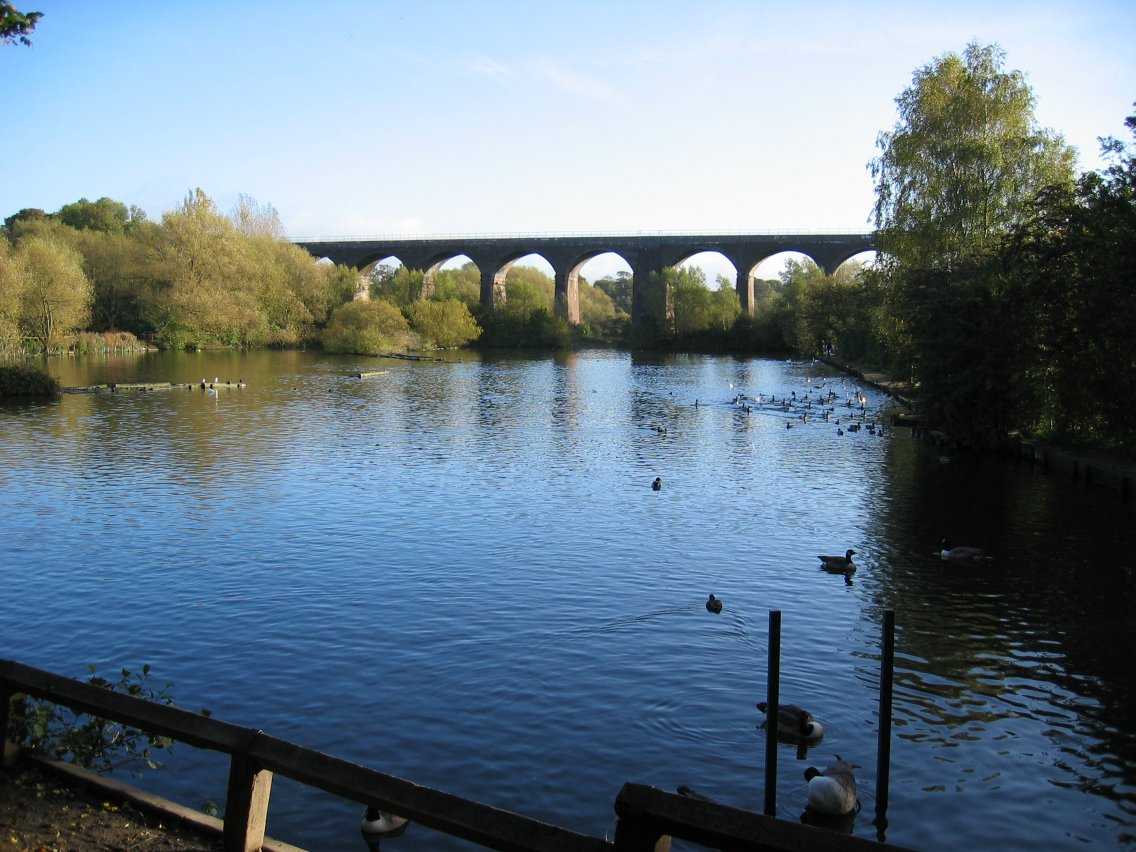
Railway viaduct and former lodge at Reddish Vale, 2006

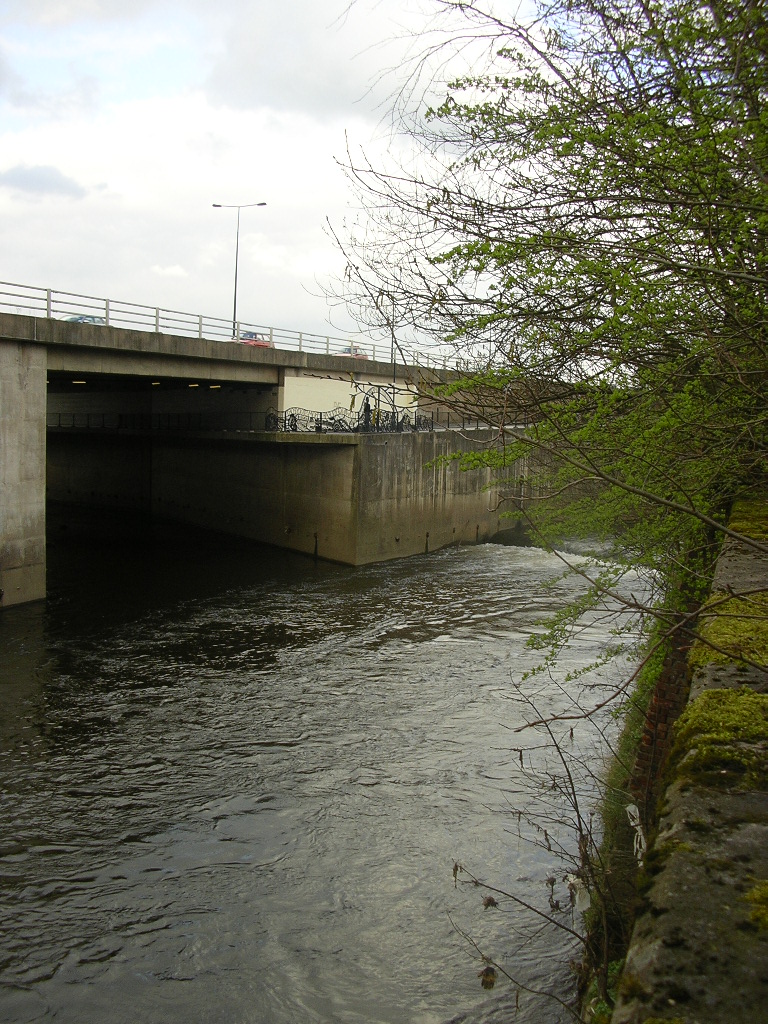
The Tame (left) meets the Goyt in Stockport to form the Mersey.

The Tame joins the River Goyt at Stockport, forming the River Mersey which eventually flows into the Irish Sea just past Liverpool.

== Toponymy ==
The name Tame is attached to rivers across the UK in several forms, including Thames, Thame, Taff, and Tamar, alongside two other instances of Tame. The name is Celtic in origin, but the meaning is uncertain. Dark river or dark one has been suggested, but Ekwall finds it unlikely; Mills suggests it may simply mean river (cf. Avon, Humber, Tyne). The names of the Mersey's co-tributaries Etherow and Goyt are equally ancient and mysterious. Mersey is an Old English name (i.e. more recent) derived from "river at the boundary". The earlier name is lost: Dodgson suggests that Tame may have been the name for the whole of the Mersey. The Metropolitan Borough of Tameside is named after the river. While it flows through the borough, the river neither rises nor finishes inside its boundaries; however, most of the built-up area alongside the river is in Tameside.

=== Fauna ===
The fish species present vary along the river's length. The lower reaches (near Reddish Vale Country Park) are home to coarse fish such as gudgeon (Gobio gobio), chub (Leuciscus cephalus), and roach (Rutilus rutilus); pike (Esox lucius) and perch (Perca fluviatilis) are also present. The upper reaches (above Ashton) support brown trout (Salmo trutta) and smaller numbers of some coarse fish. The populations are self-sustaining. Migratory fish such as Atlantic salmon and sea trout cannot navigate the river as the weir at Reddish Vale is too tall and has no fish pass. Furthermore,

- Carr Brook (from its source to the Tame)
- Diggle Brook (from Diggle Reservoir to the Tame)
- Hull Brook (Head of Lower Castleshaw Reservoir to the Tame)
- Swineshaw Brook (from the Head of Swineshaw Reservoir to the Tame)
- and the Tame (from the Head of Readycon Dean Reservoir to foot of New Years Bridge Reservoir)

are all declared as salmonid waters by statute, and as such have set physical and chemical water quality objectives.

Hull Brook is a Site of Biological Importance (SBI). Hull Brook and Castleshaw Reservoir have populations of white-clawed crayfish. The river is now clean enough in principle to support otters, but none were found in a survey in 2000–2002.

== Environment ==
In 2018 a study found that the river contained the greatest amount of microplastic contamination of any river yet surveyed.

== Later history ==
On New year day 2025, following heavy rain, the Tame burst its banks and triggered widespread flooding in Lancashire, Merseyside and Greater Manchester.

== Tributaries ==
- Denton Brook ? (R)
- Horse Close Brook ? (R)
- Hulmes Brook ? (R)
- Longacre Brook ? (L)
- Pole Bank Brook ? (L)
- Apethorne Brook ? (L)
- Gower Hey Brook (L)
- Wilson Brook (L)
  - Werneth Brook (L)
  - Godley Brook
  - Westwood Brook
- Swineshaw Brook (L)
  - Cock Knarr Brook ? (L)
  - Wicken Spring Brook (R)
- Staly Brook (L)
  - Micklehurst Brook (R)
    - Tamyon Brook (R)
  - Carr Brook
    - Iron Tongue
      - Far Harehill Brook
- Quick Brook (R)
- Chew Brook (L)
- Wickens Brook (R)
- White Brook (L)
- Pickhill Brook (L)
  - Capper Brook
  - Royle Brook
  - Wickens Brook
    - Broadstone Clough
- Diggle Brook
  - Thorns Brook (R)
    - Dean Head Brook
  - Brun Brook (R)
    - Will Brook (L)
  - Stable Brook (R)
  - Wicken Brook (L)
  - Dry Brook (L)
  - North Brook (R)
    - Hoar Brook (L)
  - Birchen Brook (L)
  - South Brook
- Wall Hill Brook (R)
- Thurston Clough Brook (R)
- Hull Brook
  - Waters Brook (L)
  - Lee Brook (L)
  - Bank Brook (R)
  - Spa Brook
  - Cudworth Brook
  - Oaken Lee Brook
- Coal brook (R)
- Rams Brook (R)
- Summer Hill Brook (L)
- Lumb Hole Brook (R)
  - Cherry Brook
  - Brimmy Brook
- Dowry Water (R)
- Readycon Dean Brook (L)
  - Great Brook (R)
  - Middle Brook (R)
  - Black Gulf (R)
- Dowry Water

== See also ==
- River Tame, West Midlands
- List of rivers of England
