= Steve Cliffe =

English councillor

Steve Cliffe, a former Stockport councillor, was the founding member of Stockport Heritage and Stockport Heritage Magazine circa 1987. He and his late wife, Jean, co-ordinated the efforts of Stockport Heritage to persuade English Heritage and the Stockport Metropolitan Borough Council to support the purchase and restoration of semi-derelict Staircase House, a 15th-century merchant's townhouse, as the town museum.

The house was finally restored with a £4 million grant and opened to the public in 2005 as a living example of the development of vernacular architecture. It has since won Civic Trust and architectural awards.

In his book, Stockport History & Guide, published in 2005, he details the struggle to get the project off the ground. In February 2018 Steve Cliffe was given a community hero award by Stockport Metropolitan Council for his role in helping save Staircase House and promoting heritage within the borough.

== Sources ==
- Stockport: a History, Arrowsmith P., 1997 ISBN 0-905164-99-7
- Stockport History & Guide, Cliffe S., 2005 ISBN 0-7524-3525-6
- Stockport Express 1987-2009 www.stockportexpress.co.uk/news/s/1187107_publisher_is_left_out_of_pocket
- Stockport Express Jul 26, 2017 www.stockportexpress.co.uk/news_last_edition_of_heritage_after_30_years
- Stockport MBC Feb, 2018 www.stockport.gov.uk/_community_heroes_scheme
