= Tin Brook (Stockport) =

Tin Brook Carr Brook, Hempshaw Brook
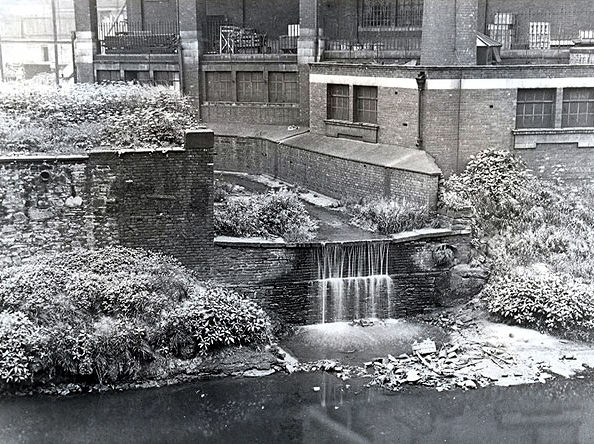
- Tin Brook, 1935

Location
- Country: England
- County: Greater Manchester

Physical characteristics
- Mouth: River Mersey
  - location: Stockport
  - coordinates: 53.409589°N 2.162563°W

Basin features
- Tributaries
  - left: Brown House Fold Brook

Tin Brook, also known as Carr Brook or Hempshaw Brook earlier in its course, is a culverted stream in Stockport, Greater Manchester, England. The Brook is a minor tributary to the River Mersey.

== Etymology ==
The name possibly originates from the Old English tȳnan, 'to enclose'.

== History ==
=== Before the 20th century ===
Hempshaw Brook cut a deep valley in Little Underbank on its southwestern side, through erosion of the areas red sandstone. Located at both ends of the valley was a carr, which enhanced the areas natural defencibility.

According to tradition, the Brook was described as a clear and crystal stream flowing down a valley, that was crossed nearby Lower Hillgate through a paved way allowing carriages to pass through, and stepping stones for passengers.

By 1718, the Brook was crossed by the 'Brook Bridge' located in Lower Hillgate, which became known as the 'Schole-House Bridge' in 1744. The Tin Brook's original outfall, located between the present day Chestergate Tavern and Primark building in the Merseyway Shopping Centre, was built in the mid-18th century.

As early as 1744, authority was obtained to place a dam on the section of what would later be known as the Carr Valley, to power silk mills. The mill was built in 1759, and was powered by the High Carr Dam. Thomas Hope bought the land in the 1790s, and constructed a series of cotton mills across the valley.

In 1835, Hempshaw Brook Brewery was constructed, damming the Brook to create a reservoir.

Stockport Cemetery was opened on the banks of the Brook in 1838, eventually expanding over the Brook, which was covered by a brick tunnel.

By 1872, the Hempshaw Brook Brewery had expanded and built over the reservoir, culverting it with a brick tunnel.

=== Post-industrial revolution ===
In the 1967 Stockport air disaster, a Canadair C-4 Argonaut struck a substation overlooking the Brook, killing 72 of the 84 people on board. Following a flood, the rest of the Brook in Merseyway was culverted during the rebuilding of Chestergate.

In 1995, a new flood outlet sewer was built to prevent storm water and sewage from backing up, further moving the brook's outfall east.

== Course ==
The Brook rises in either Woodsmoor, Great Moor or Heaviley.

The stream flows northwest toward Stockport Cemetery, where it is joined by the Brown House Fold Brook and flows toward the Carr Valley, where the Brook is locally known as the Carr Brook.

The Carr Brook flows northwest underneath Wellington Street, where it becomes known as the Tin Brook. A flood outlet sewer built in 1995 relocated the Brook's outfall underneath the Merseyway Shopping Centre.
