= Stockport Heritage Magazine =

English magazine

Stockport Heritage Magazine was started in 1987 by two founder members of Stockport Heritage, a voluntary conservation group campaigning to save buildings and traditions in the Borough of Stockport, historically in Cheshire, now within Greater Manchester.

The aim of the magazine was to generate interest among the local residents in issues such as the saving of the 15th-century Staircase House, then a derelict eyesore and subsequently restored and opened to the public in 2005 after their successful campaign to enlist the support of public bodies like English Heritage and the Stockport Metropolitan Borough Council.

The magazine was funded by Jean and Steve Cliffe from their own resources, published and edited by themselves and run entirely without official assistance using volunteer writers and researchers as a community publishing venture, written for and by the people of Stockport and district. It is still published on these principles despite the death of one of the founders, Jean Cliffe, in 1997. The magazine finally ceased publication with the autumn, 2017, issue after being edited by Steve Cliffe for 30 years.
