= Angel Inn, Stockport =

Listed pub in Greater Manchester, England

Angel Inn
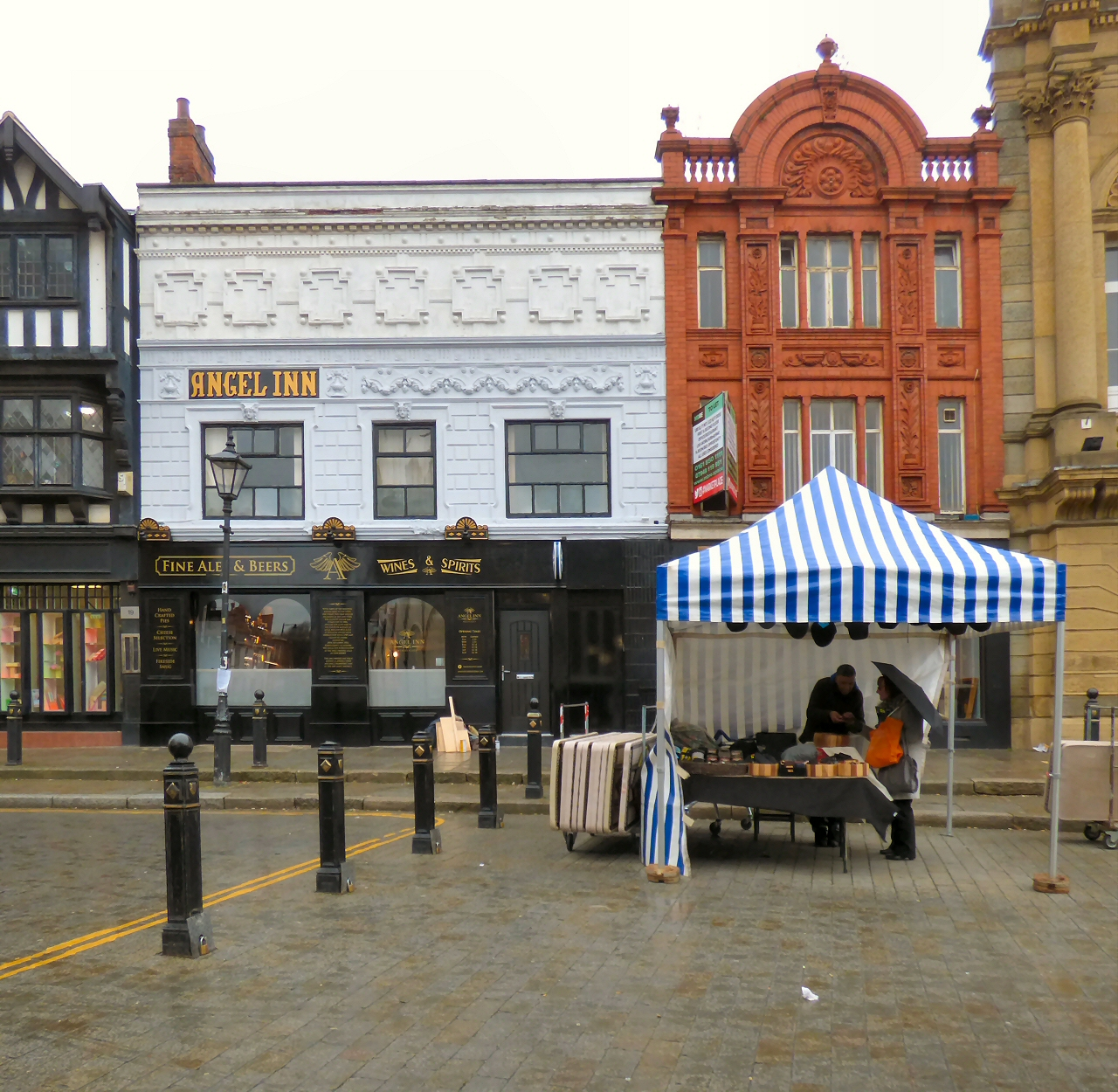
- The pub in 2018

- Location within Greater Manchester

General information
- Type: Public house
- Location: 20–21 Market Place, Stockport, Greater Manchester, England
- Coordinates: 53.4115°N 2.1573°W
- Year built: 16th century (probable)
- Renovated: 17th century (altered); 18th and 19th centuries (adapted); 2024 (refurbished)

Design and construction
- Designations

Listed Building – Grade II
- Official name: Former Angel Inn
- Designated: 15 May 2025
- Reference no.: 1490434

The Angel Inn is a Grade II listed public house on Market Place in Stockport, Greater Manchester, England. The pub now occupies the ground floors of Nos. 20 and 21, while the listing covers the whole of Nos. 20–22 and is recorded under the name Former Angel Inn. Probably built in the 16th century, it began as a house and later an inn, was subsequently converted to shops, and returned to pub use in 2018.

== History ==
The building that is now 20–22 Market Place began as a house, probably constructed in the 16th century, with some fabric from earlier periods and a later 17th‑century addition, and it was altered in the 18th and 19th centuries for uses including an inn and a drapery. The oldest surviving section forms part of the front of today's No. 20, on a site believed to have been occupied by Cotterell's inn, which hosted official gatherings in the 1640s. Records also note Robert Cottrell making Easter payments to the parish church from a marketplace property in 1619, thought to refer to this location.

According to Historic England, evidence from the remaining structure and old maps shows that the building began as a modest two‑storey property set slightly further back from the street, probably with attic rooms facing the marketplace. It seems to have continued southwards, where No. 19 now stands, and northwards into the present No. 22. A rear wing was added around 1661, incorporating new timbers as well as much older boards thought to have been reused from a medieval building on the site. These early elements are of a similar date to the oldest surviving fabric in nearby Staircase House.

Later in the 1700s or early 1800s, the front of the southern bays was rebuilt in brick and raised to three storeys, possibly when the inn became known as the Angel Inn, a name known from at least 1769. Around the same time, a separate rear building was added as a function room, used for events in the early 1800s, but it had gone by the 1851 Ordnance Survey. By then the main building had been split into three parts, and the lightwell behind No. 22 had been closed off by a full‑width addition linked to No. 21.

The whole frontage was probably rendered in the mid‑1800s, with a continuous parapet and cornice. At this time, 17th‑century‑style window surrounds were added to the first floor of Nos. 20 and 21, and matching but differently designed windows were installed on the upper floors of Nos. 21 and 22. A photograph taken after 1875 shows two shopfronts at street level in Nos. 21 and 22: No. 21 was then at least partly used by Samuel Chadwick, a wholesale tea and coffee merchant, and No. 22 was occupied by the woollen drapers R. H. Rostron.

In 1886 architect T. H. Allen designed a new frontage for the Angel Inn, introducing a decorative frieze, angel reliefs and new window surrounds, while the ground floor of No. 21 continued as a separate shop. The 1922 and 1936 Ordnance Survey maps mark the building as a public house without attributing a name.

In 1951 the Angel Inn was operating as a Bell's Brewery tied house, and it closed that same year. By 1959 the ground floor of Nos. 20 and 21 was being used as a single shop, and by the late 1980s its street frontage had been tiled. In 2014 a community café opened on the ground floor of Nos. 20 and 21 as part of the Portas high street scheme, and in 2018 it began trading again as the Angel Inn pub. In 2024 the upper floors across the whole building were stripped back for refurbishment so they could continue in office use. On 15 May 2025, the building recorded as the Former Angel Inn, which includes the Angel Inn, was designated a Grade II listed building.

== Architecture ==
The building is mainly timber‑framed, with some early wattle and daub surviving, and later brick additions. Parts of the front were later finished in plaster. The roofs are slate and the windows are timber. It has a front block running roughly north–south, with rear wings extending west from the northern units and a shared range behind them. No. 20, at the south end, is irregular in shape and sits partly behind the neighbouring property, which is not included in the listing.

The left section, forming the Angel Inn, has three bays and two storeys with a blind attic above a modern shopfront. The upper floors are plastered and decorated with mouldings, including shaped window surrounds with angel keystones, garlands, a frieze, and patterned panels beneath the parapet.

No. 20 is partly attached to No. 19, and its exposed south wall is mostly blank with a few later windows. Its rear has two bays, one gabled with a canted ground‑floor window. The south side of No. 21 is also rendered, with two bays at the east end and a small basement porch, and a taller semi‑gabled section at the west end with a quatrefoil window above the first floor. The west side of No. 21 rises above the listed town walls and is faced in white glazed tiles, with three large windows on each floor.

The Angel Inn pub is entered through the former No. 21. Most of the interior is modern, though No. 20 keeps two early ceiling beams, one linked to the 1600s structure above, and No. 21 retains a similar early beam.

== See also ==
- Listed buildings in Stockport
- Listed pubs in Greater Manchester
