= Market Place, Stockport =

Market square in Greater Manchester, England

Market Place
- Market Place from the north‑west in 2017, with the Market Hall in the centre and St Mary's Church in the background
- Interactive map of Market Place
- Type: Market square
- Location: Stockport, Greater Manchester, England
- Postal code: SK1
- Coordinates: 53.4116°N 2.1569°W
- North: Vernon Street
- East: Churchgate
- South: Mealhouse Brow
- West: Bridge Street Brow

Market Place is a historic market square in the Old Town area of Stockport, Greater Manchester, England. Occupying the summit of a sandstone promontory, it is enclosed by streets of the same name and approached by steep medieval routes. It has formed the centre of the town since the Middle Ages and contains a concentration of listed buildings, including the Market Hall, which continues to host market trading, and several 18th and 19th‑century commercial premises. The square lies within the Market and Underbanks conservation area and remains a focal point for civic events, local heritage and regular outdoor markets.

== History ==
=== 13th–17th century ===
Market Place occupies the summit of a red sandstone promontory overlooking a historic ford across the River Mersey, a position that shaped the early development of Stockport. The town received its market charter in 1260, and the square became the centre of a prosperous medieval market town served by a network of roads converging on the hilltop. Lancashire Bridge, which crossed the Mersey nearby, was one of only three medieval crossings of the river, contributing to the commercial importance of the settlement. The surrounding street pattern, characterised by long, narrow burgage plots fronting the principal routes, has remained largely unchanged for more than 300 years.

From the 15th century onwards, timber‑framed houses were built around the Market Place, including Staircase House. By the 17th century Stockport had become a centre of small domestic industries such as spinning, weaving, leather crafting and millinery, while the market traded local cheeses and cloth, including the linen known as Stopport cloth. Civic buildings, including the old court leet and lock‑up at the top of Mealhouse Brow, stood close to the square.

=== 18th–20th century ===
Rapid expansion in the late 18th and early 19th centuries accompanied Stockport's emergence as one of the region's earliest industrial centres. The first water‑powered textile factory in the North West was built below the Market Place in 1732, followed in the 1770s by Castle Mill, one of the town's earliest cotton mills.

St Mary's Church and the south side of the Market Hall, 2025

Between 1813 and 1817 the medieval church of St Mary's, of which only the early-14th-century chancel survives today, was largely rebuilt, giving the square its present dominant ecclesiastical landmark. Timber buildings were increasingly replaced or refaced in brick, Churchgate was widened in 1818 to ease congestion, and the Market Place was repaved around 1820. A new Borough Court House was built at Castle Yard in 1824, which was subsequently converted into a retail and leisure complex known as The Courts, completed in 2004.

The Corporation's purchase of the manorial market rights in 1850 led to substantial improvements. The stone‑colonnaded Produce Hall was built in 1851, its upper floor serving as the town's free library for nearly four decades. In 1860 the open Market Place was roofed with a wrought and cast‑iron structure known as the "Glass Umbrella", later enclosed and shortened in 1912 to accommodate trolleybuses. Access from the west was improved in 1864 with the construction of St Petersgate Bridge, which required demolition of buildings in the south‑west corner of the square and their replacement with Bank Chambers, formerly occupied by NatWest.

Although the construction of Wellington Road (1824–1825) and the railway (1840–1842) shifted civic and commercial focus westwards, the Market Place retained a concentration of historic buildings. Mid‑20th‑century proposals to relocate the market and redevelop the square were not implemented, but by the 1980s many buildings had fallen into disrepair. In 1974 the Market Place was included in the newly established Market and Underbanks conservation area.

=== 21st century ===
Conservation‑led regeneration from the early 21st century has restored key structures and revitalised the area. The Market Hall was restored in 2008, retaining its historic function as a covered market while improving facilities for traders and visitors. Public‑realm works using traditional materials were carried out across the Old Town, and heritage‑focused projects have supported the repair of historic buildings, the reuse of vacant properties and the sensitive infill of gap sites. These initiatives have helped re‑establish Market Place as a mixed‑use area combining residential, leisure, tourism and retail activity. Regular outdoor markets continue to be held in the square.

Foodie Friday, a monthly street‑food event, began in the 2010s as part of efforts to revitalise the Old Town. Centred on Market Place, it brings traders and evening activity to the square.

== Layout and architecture ==
The square is approached by a network of steep, narrow medieval streets that converge on the hilltop. To the north-west, Bridge Street Brow rises from Great Underbank, while Vernon Street to the north links downhill with Warren Street. Park Street also meets the north side of Market Place, and Millgate on the eastern edge is now blocked with bollards. To the south‑east, Market Place meets Churchgate. To the south, it connects with Mealhouse Brow, which descends sharply to Little Underbank. To the south‑west, the square opens towards St Petersgate, linked by the St Petersgate Bridge.

Market Place is dominated by the Market Hall, its irregular parallelogram plan set at the centre of the square and enclosed on three sides by streets all named Market Place. The Grade I-listed St Mary's parish church overlooks the square from its elevated churchyard on the east side.

On the south side of Market Place stands No. 8, built in the early 19th century but with a rainwater head dated 1743; and the mid-19th-century Bull's Head pub at No. 13, which adjoins the north elevation of Bank Chambers, built in 1868. On the west side are the Angel Inn at Nos. 20–22; the Produce Hall, built in 1852 with an upper storey added in 1875; the late-18th or early-19th-century No. 25; and the late-19th-century Bakers Vaults pub, separated by Bridge Street Brow. On the north-east side is the Boar's Head pub, on the corner with Vernon Street; Nos. 26–27 and Nos. 28–28A, the latter separated by Park Street, all from the late 18th or early 19th century; the late-15th-century Grade II*-listed Staircase House at Nos. 30A–31; and the early-19th-century No. 34.

== Gallery ==
Bank Chambers (right) and Bull's Head (left), 2017

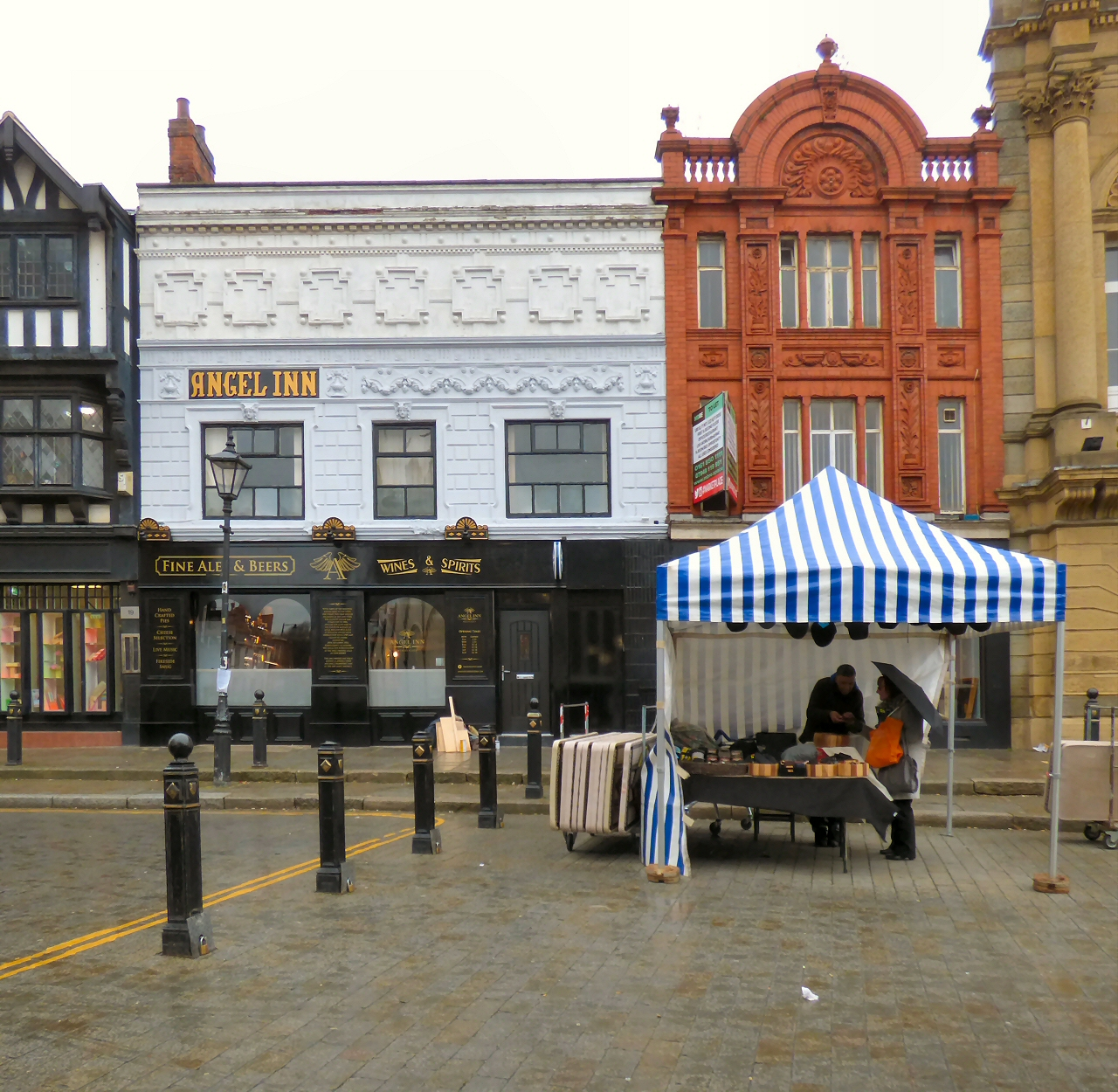
Angel Inn, 2018

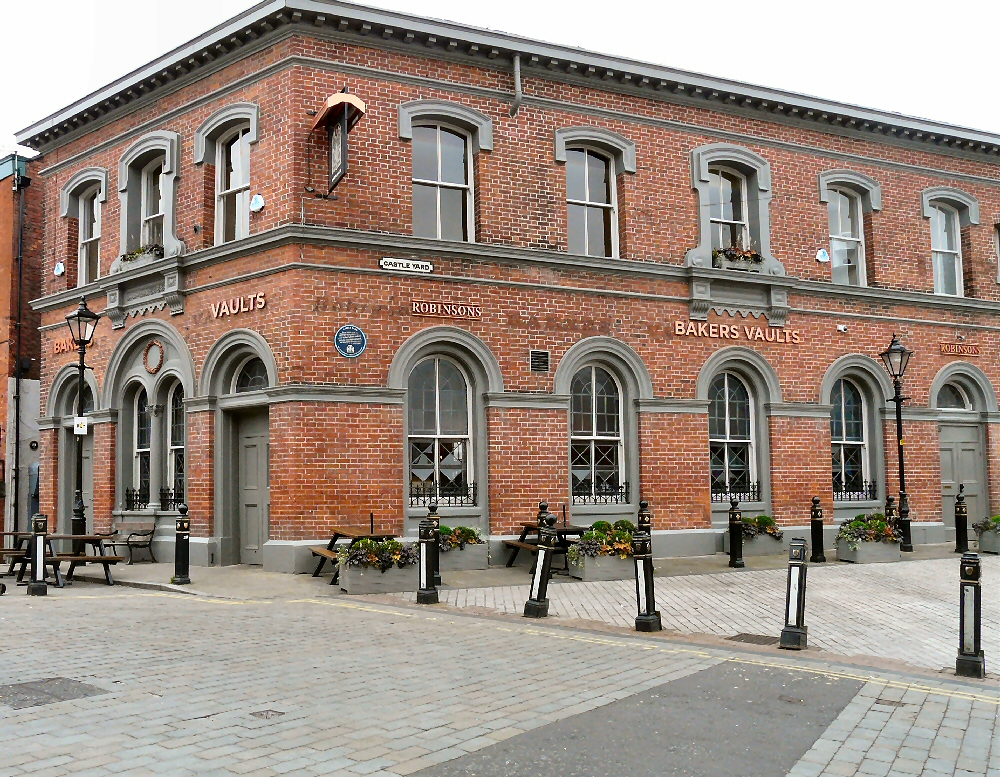
Bakers Vaults, 2014

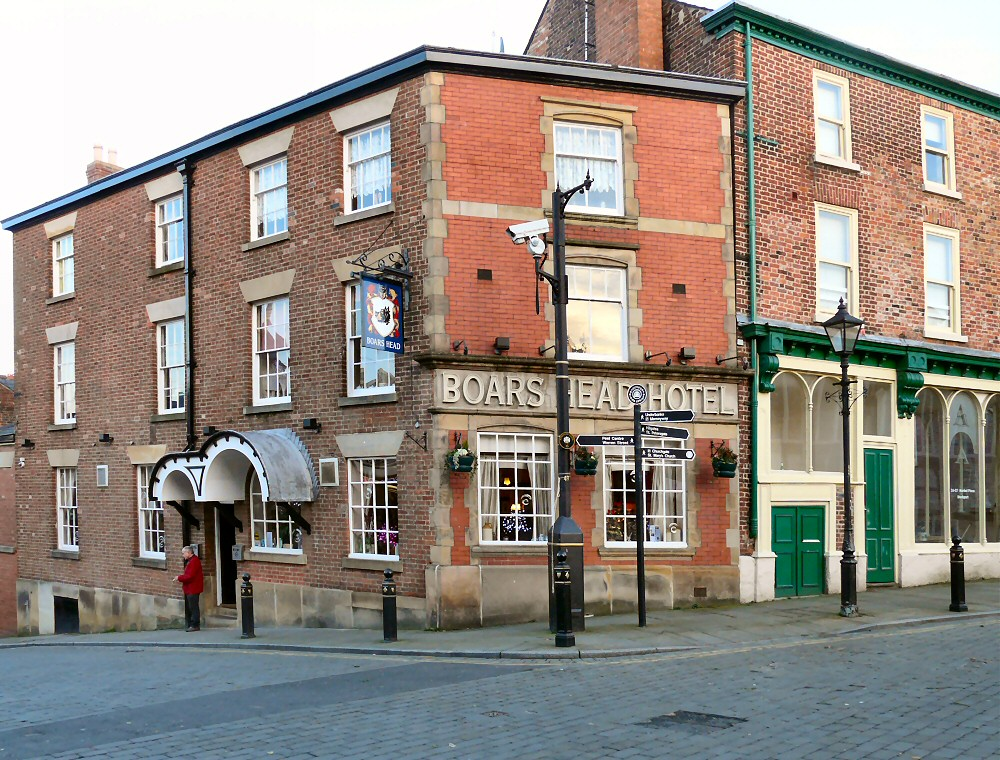
Boar's Head, 2013

Staircase House, 2012

== See also ==
- Listed buildings in Stockport
