= Underbank Hall =

Listed building in Stockport, Greater Manchester, England

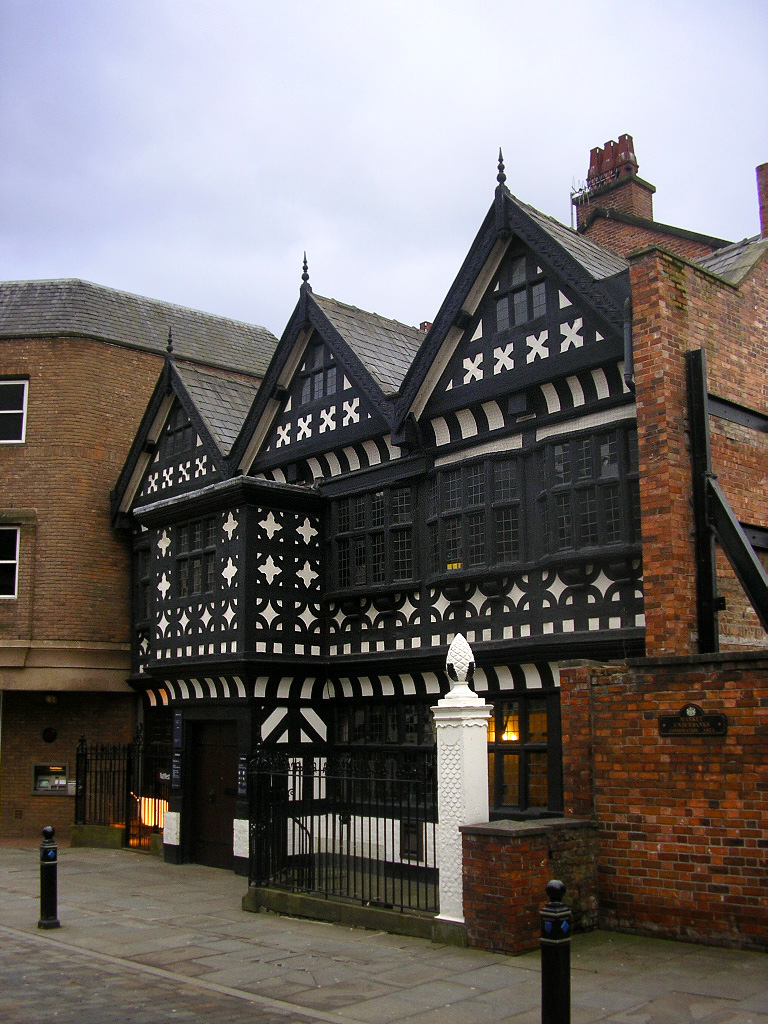
- The Tudor front of Underbank Hall, 2008

- Location within Greater Manchester
- Alternative names: 10 Great Underbank

General information
- Type: Town house (former); now a bank
- Location: 10 Great Underbank, Stockport, Greater Manchester, England
- Coordinates: 53.4117°N 2.1582°W
- Completed: 16th century

Technical details
- Structural system: Timber-framed

Design and construction
- Designations

Listed Building – Grade II*
- Official name: 10, Great Underbank
- Designated: 13 May 1952
- Reference no.: 1356829

Underbank Hall (officially listed as 10 Great Underbank) is a Grade II* listed former townhouse in the Underbank area of Stockport, Greater Manchester, England. Dating from the 16th century, it was later associated with the Arden family of Bredbury and has been used as a bank since the early 19th century. The building is now occupied by a branch of NatWest.

== History ==
The hall is generally dated to the 16th century, in accordance with its Historic England listing. An earlier Stockport Metropolitan Borough Council webpage described the building as dating from the 15th century, although the council's current website also dates it to the 16th century.

It was the home of a branch of the Arden family of Bredbury, who were related to the playwright, poet and actor William Shakespeare on his mother's side.

In 1823 it was sold by William Arden, 2nd Baron Alvanley to pay off debts and was converted into a bank. A banking hall was added at the rear in 1919. The building continues to operate as a bank and now houses the NatWest branch for Stockport. On 13 May 1952, it was designated a Grade II* listed building.

== Architecture ==
The building is constructed with a timber frame and infill panels, rising two storeys with additional attic space. The upper level projects slightly and is carried on a shaped wooden beam. The front has four large first‑floor windows set in decorative timber surrounds, each divided into multiple panes and supported on small brackets. The ground floor is mostly taken up by matching windows.

A two‑storey porch projects from the front, finished with shaped timber details. Above it are three small gabled features, each containing a multi‑paned window, and the gables have patterned bargeboards and finials. Inside, some rooms and the staircase retain early timber panelling, and there is a carved fireplace displaying the Arden family's coat of arms. The grounds include modern railings and end posts topped with pineapple‑shaped ornaments.

== See also ==
- Grade II* listed buildings in Greater Manchester
- Listed buildings in Stockport
