= South Trafford Archaeological Group =

Archaeological group in the UK

The South Trafford Archaeological Group (STAG) is an archaeological group based in Timperley, Greater Manchester. The group promotes interest in and the study of archaeology and history locally, especially within Trafford but also beyond the borders of the borough. Its activities include post-excavation work and documentary research.

STAG was formed in 1979 and provides facilities for volunteer archaeologists from south Manchester and north-east Cheshire. It has 95 members and is based near the site of Timperley Old Hall – a medieval moated hall – and the clubhouse of the Altrincham Municipal Golf Course. STAG has undertaken excavations as far away as Condate, the Roman name for Northwich, in Cheshire. The group has been involved with sites such as Timperley Old Hall; Carrs Mill in Stalybridge; Moore's hat factory in Denton; the medieval hall in Urmston; and Moss Brow farm in Warburton. The excavations in Warburton led to the site being excavated by Time Team in 2006 with the involvement of STAG.

In 2008, STAG was awarded £44,400 by the Heritage Lottery Fund to renovate the site of Timperley Old Hall. The work involved building a bridge across the moat, installing information boards, and developing an information scheme for local schools. It also allowed new archaeological investigations at the hall.

== See also ==
- Stockport Heritage
