= Boar's Head, Stockport =

Listed former pub in Greater Manchester, England

Boar's Head
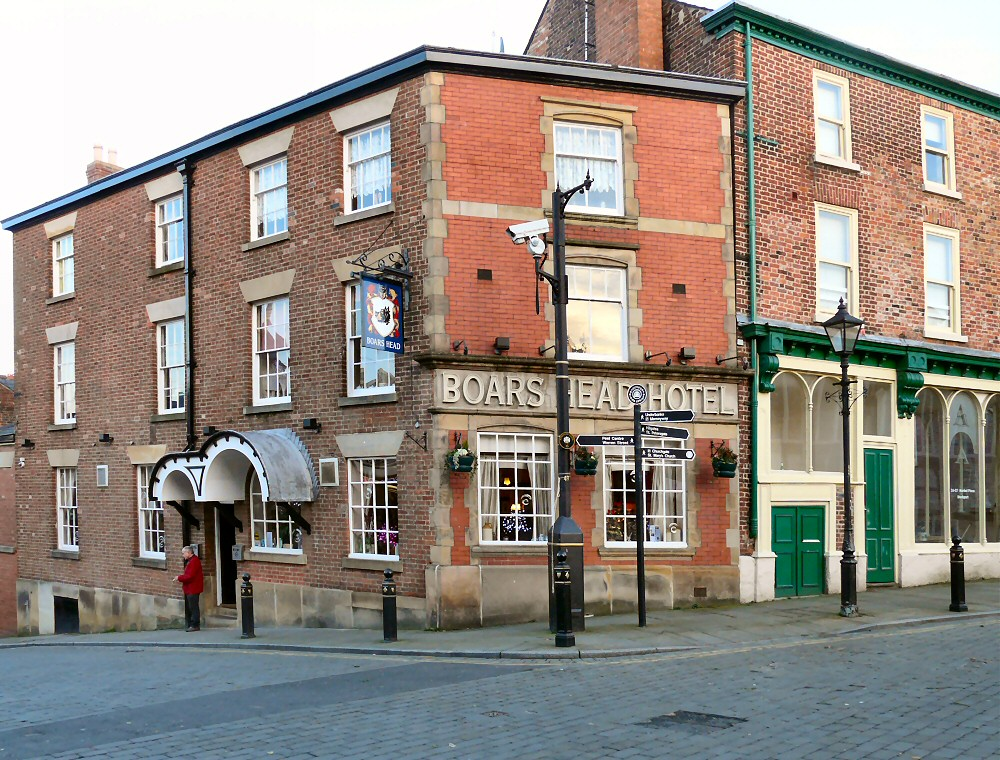
- The pub in 2013

- Location within Greater Manchester
- Alternative names: Boars Head Hotel

General information
- Status: Vacant
- Type: Public house (former)
- Location: 2 Vernon Street, Stockport, Greater Manchester, England
- Coordinates: 53.4119°N 2.1569°W
- Year built: Early 19th century
- Renovated: Late 19th century (partially refronted)
- Closed: 2024
- Owner: Samuel Smith's

Design and construction
- Designations

Listed Building – Grade II
- Official name: Boars Head Hotel
- Designated: 10 March 1975
- Reference no.: 1162926

The Boar's Head is a Grade II listed former public house on the corner of Vernon Street and Market Place in Stockport, Greater Manchester, England. Built in the early 19th century, it received a new frontage to Market Place later in the century. The pub, owned by Samuel Smith's, closed in November 2024 while the freehold owner sought a new tenant, and as of November 2026 no update on its future has been published.

== History ==
The building was constructed in the early 19th century, and the side facing Market Place was refronted in the late 19th century, according to its official listing. The 1874 Ordnance Survey map shows the building without a name or designation, while the 1922 and 1936 editions record it as a public house.

On 10 March 1975, the Boars Head Hotel was designated a Grade II listed building. It forms a group with the Grade II-listed 26 and 27 Market Place.

In November 2024, the pub closed as the freehold owner, Samuel Smith's, was seeking a new tenant. As of November 2026, no further information has been published about the pub's status or future use.

== Architecture ==
=== Exterior ===
The building is constructed in brick above a stone base with simple stone details at the corners and along the lower edge. It rises three storeys and the main front dates from the early 19th century. This elevation has four evenly spaced sash windows on each of the upper floors, all with glazing bars and plain stucco heads. The ground floor also has four windows with stone heads; one has lost its glazing bars and another is set within a shallow round arch.

The building's only entrance is on the Vernon Street side. It is a six‑panel door with a semi‑circular fanlight, now sheltered by a modern canopy added in the late 20th century. This longer elevation has four bays with windows set under plain stone wedge‑shaped heads and resting on stone sills.

The single bay facing Market Place was given a new frontage in the late 19th century, with more decorative window heads and stone surrounds.

=== Interior ===
Although the interior has been altered over time, parts of the 19th‑century layout and some features from that period still survive. The front part of the building contains two rooms: a plain lounge on the right and a larger, more comfortably furnished space on the left. Behind these is another lounge, formerly used for music, which opens onto a decked outdoor area.

== See also ==
- Listed buildings in Stockport
- Listed pubs in Greater Manchester
