= Timperley Hall =

- Location within Greater Manchester

General information
- Architectural style: moated manor house
- Location: Timperley, Greater Manchester, England
- Coordinates: 53.389341°N 2.336682°W

Timperley Hall was a moated manor house in Timperley, Greater Manchester, England, first recorded in 1560, but almost certainly built to replace an earlier medieval structure. Very little remains of the 16th-century hall, which is not shown on the Tithe map of 1838. The date of the hall's demolition is unknown, but the size of the moat suggests that it was a "substantial" house. The present-day Timperley Hall was probably constructed during the late 18th century, close to the site of the older hall.

The present-day hall, referred to locally as "The Old Hall", served as the club house for Timperley Golf Club from 1896 until 1934. Since 1950 it has been owned by a series of breweries, and is now operated as a public house.

== History ==
Sir John (Mascy) de Tymperlegh is recorded as lord of the manor of Timperley in 1270; the manor subsequently passed through several generations of the de Mascy family. The first record of a hall in the manor appears in the 1560 will of William Aderne, Mayor of Altrincham. Although that must have replaced an earlier medieval Hall, archeological excavations have discovered very little evidence of the older structure's existence, other than a great deal of medieval pottery. The Reverend Croxton Johnson inherited the Timperley Hall estate from his father, George Johnson, in 1795. He offered the 46-hectare (110-acre) estate to the Earl of Stamford for £25,000 in 1809, equivalent to about £1.75 million in 2025, (Note: UK Consumer Price Index inflation figures from 1209–2024 based on data from "Inflation calculator", Bank of England, London, 18 February 2026) but the sale did not go ahead. The property was advertised for sale the following year, and was bought by local businessman James Wood in 1811. Timperley Hall was then described as a "handsome mansion of brick", suggesting that it may have been built at some time during the latter half of the 18th century, perhaps by George Johnson. Evidence from the estate's rate books suggests that the moated Hall had been demolished by 1811, and that its site was being used as a walled garden. In 1828, Joseph Sutton, formerly of J&J Sutton timber merchants, was in occupation according to Pigot's Altrincham commercial directory. He described himself as "of Timperley Hall" in his 1829 will, but did not bequeath the property itself, suggesting he was a leaseholder. Joseph Sutton died in September 1834 at Timperley Hall.

== Timperley "Old" Hall ==
There are no known eyewitness accounts or drawings to indicate what the moated Hall looked like, but it may have been similar to the half-timbered Davenportgreen Hall in nearby Hale, which was probably built at about the same time. The Hall was built on a roughly rectangular platform of clay, 42 metres (138 ft) long by 40 metres (130 ft) wide, surrounded on all sides by a flat-bottomed moat varying from 10–18 metres (33–59 ft) in width and about 1.5 metres (4 ft 11 in) in depth. Water for the moat came from a tributary of the nearby Timperley Brook. A stone and brick twin-arched bridge, about 3 metres (9.8 ft) wide, spanned the north moat, allowing access to the hall. The bridge was badly damaged by a falling tree during the winter of 1993–4, and it was subsequently demolished.

=== Excavations ===
Excavations carried out by the South Trafford Archaeological Group between 1986 and 2004 produced pottery finds indicating that the site of the Old Hall was continuously occupied from the 14th century until the end of the 18th century.

== Timperley "New" Hall ==
Present-day Timperley Hall is an 18th-century three-storey brick building to which wings were added at a later date. Very little remains of the original structure, as the building has been refurbished many times during its lifetime. Cellars beneath the main building are barrel-vaulted. Some of the internal brickwork was revealed during refurbishment in 2004, exposing small, hand-made bricks that date from the late 17th century, probably taken from the moated Hall. Referred to locally as "The Old Hall", the building served as the club house for Timperley Golf Club from 1896 until 1934, when it and the estate – which included the golf course – were bought jointly by Altrincham Urban District Council and Timperley Parish Council for £38,000, equivalent to about £2.35 million in 2025. The golf course was opened to the public in 1935. Since 1950, the hall has been owned by a series of breweries, most recently by Marston's, and it is now operated as a public house. The site of the moated hall, Trafford Hall Farm, and the golf club, are owned by Trafford Council as of 2010.
