= Bull's Head, Stockport =

Listed former pub in Greater Manchester, England

Bull's Head
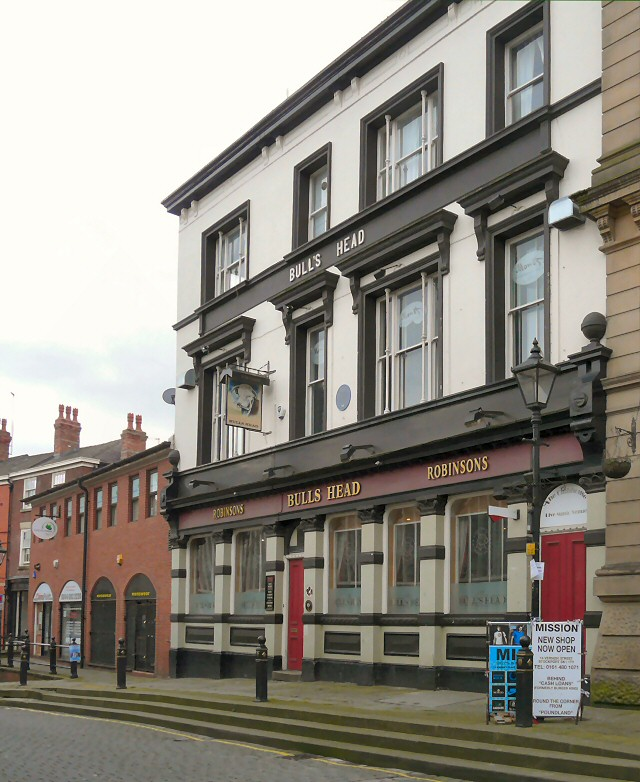
- The former pub in 2012

- Location within Greater Manchester

General information
- Status: Vacant
- Type: Public house (former)
- Location: 13 Market Place, Stockport, Greater Manchester, England
- Coordinates: 53.4113°N 2.1570°W
- Year built: Mid-19th century
- Closed: 2011
- Owner: Robinsons

Design and construction
- Designations

Listed Building – Grade II
- Official name: Bulls Head public house
- Designated: 10 March 1975
- Reference no.: 1067182

The Bull's Head is a Grade II listed former public house on Market Place in Stockport, Greater Manchester, England. Although the present building dates from the mid‑19th century, a pub of the same name stood on the site from at least the early 18th century and was a venue for political gatherings in the early 19th century. It was acquired by Robinsons Brewery in 1917. The building has been closed since 2011, and a refurbishment announced in 2020 has not been followed by any further updates as of November 2026.

== History ==
The building was constructed on Market Place in the mid-19th century, according to its official listing. (Note: Stockport Metropolitan Borough Council gives a construction date of 1867.) Other sources, however, indicate that a public house called the Bull's Head had occupied the site since 1731.

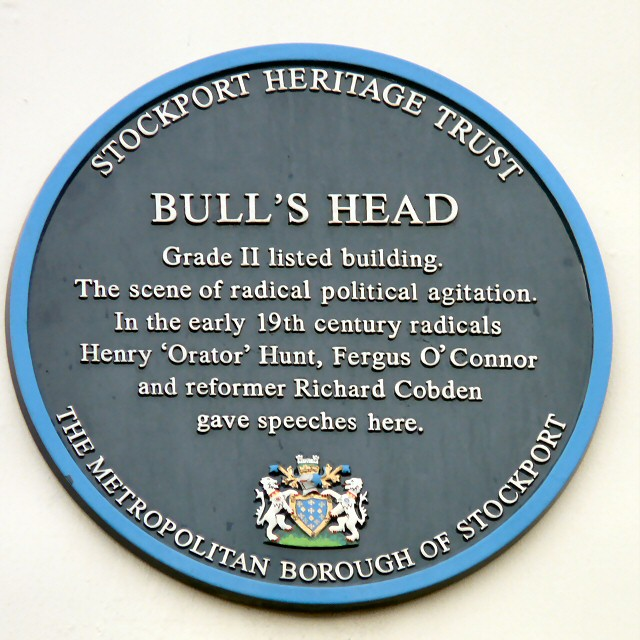
The memorial plaque in 2012

Contemporary accounts record that political radicals Henry Hunt, Feargus O'Connor, and Richard Cobden addressed crowds from a balcony at the Bull's Head in the early 19th century, suggesting that an earlier structure stood on the site prior to the later rebuilding described in the listing. A blue plaque on the exterior of the building records this history.

The 1874 Ordnance Survey map shows the building without a name or designation, while the 1922 and 1936 editions record it as a public house. In 1917 the Bull's Head was acquired by Robinsons Brewery.

On 10 March 1975, the Bull's Head was designated a Grade II listed building. It forms a group with the Grade II-listed 8 Market Place and Bank Chambers on St Petersgate. The pub has remained closed since November 2011 after a period of poor trading. Robinsons announced in 2020 that a refurbishment was planned, but there have been no subsequent reports on whether the work proceeded or on the pub's future as of November 2026.

== Architecture ==
The building has three storeys and a rendered exterior with painted stone details and a slate roof. The ground level is arranged as a continuous frontage of door and window openings set between pilasters with decorative tops. A cornice runs above them, finished with ball-shaped ornaments at each end. On the upper floors, groups of three windows set between very slender metal supports alternate with single windows. Those on the first floor are topped with small projecting ledges carried on curved brackets. A further moulded cornice with paired brackets sits above. Inside, the layout has been altered, though some original ceiling plasterwork remains.

== See also ==
- Listed buildings in Stockport
- Listed pubs in Greater Manchester
