= White Lion, Stockport =

Listed pub in Greater Manchester, England

White Lion
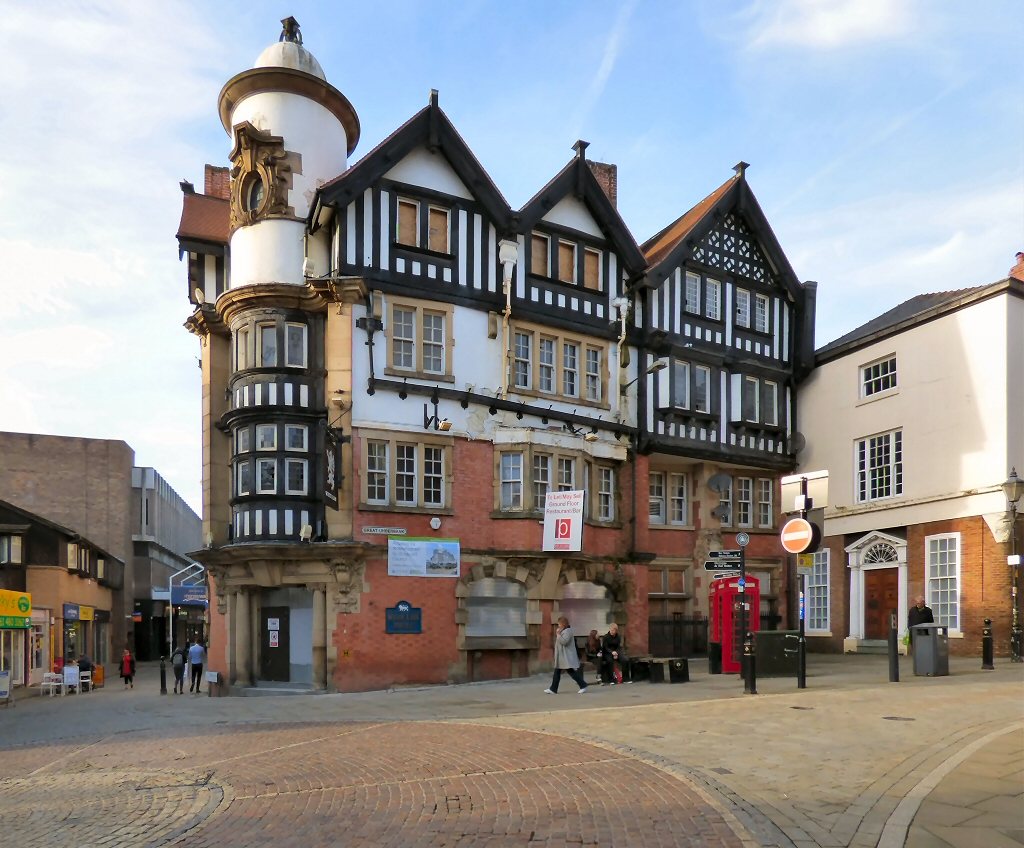
- The pub in 2016

- Location within Greater Manchester
- Alternative names: White Lion Coaching House; White Lion Hotel

General information
- Type: Public house (with apartments above)
- Location: 20 Great Underbank, Underbank, Stockport, Greater Manchester, England
- Coordinates: 53.4113°N 2.1584°W
- Year built: 1904; 122 years ago
- Opening: 1905, 2024
- Renovated: 2020 (upper floors converted)
- Closed: 2009
- Client: Chesters Brewery

Design and construction
- Architect: James Barritt Broadbent
- Designations

Listed Building – Grade II
- Official name: The White Lion Hotel
- Designated: 21 September 1993
- Reference no.: 1240653

Website
- whitelioncoachinghouse.co.uk

The White Lion is a Grade II listed public house on Great Underbank, in the Underbank area of Stockport, Greater Manchester, England. The site has been occupied by a licensed inn since 1490, and successive buildings were altered and rebuilt. The present structure was built in 1904 for Chesters Brewery to designs by James Barritt Broadbent and opened the following year. Closed in 2009, it was acquired by Stockport Metropolitan Borough Council in 2015, with the upper floors converted into apartments in 2020 and the pub reopening in 2024 after extensive renovation.

== History ==
A licensed inn has stood on the site since 1490, starting with the earlier White Horse, which was first licensed as a coaching inn on the main route south from Manchester. Its proximity to the River Mersey gave rise to the belief that visitors were allowed to fish for salmon from the beer garden and to use the inn's pew at the nearby St Mary's Church. The building was rebuilt several times, and No. 22 Great Underbank was last re‑fronted in 1823 in a traditional Cheshire half‑timber style.

The present building was constructed in 1904, according to its official listing, a date that appears on a rainwater head. Designed by James Barritt Broadbent for Chesters Brewery, the White Lion Hotel opened the following year, in 1905. At some point, No. 20, a brick building with an archway providing vehicular access to the rear properties, was incorporated into the hotel.

The 1922 and 1936 Ordnance Survey maps mark the building as a hotel without attributing a name. The outbuildings to the rear of the premises were demolished after the Second World War.

On 21 September 1993, the White Lion Hotel was designated a Grade II listed building. Closed in 2009, the building was acquired by Stockport Metropolitan Borough Council in 2015. In 2020 the upper floors were converted into 11 apartments under a scheme designed by Bowker Sadler Architecture and overseen by the council in partnership with Trafford Housing Trust, and further works led to the renovation of the ground floor and basement and the pub's reopening in 2024. The building had stood vacant for approximately 15 years and had deteriorated significantly prior to its restoration.

== Architecture ==
=== Exterior ===
The building is constructed in brick with stone detailing, areas of render, and sections of timber framing, creating a varied front. It has a plain tile roof and combines elements drawn from late‑medieval and Baroque traditions, typical of the lively architectural style of the Edwardian era. It is of three storeys with attic rooms, and has a two‑storey wing facing Deanery Way. The main entrance is on the corner, with a four‑bay front and a two‑window return.

A semi-circular porch marks the entrance and is topped by a tower. Tall pilasters run the full height of the two main elevations. Above the doorway, the tower has timber framing and two tiers of windows with mullions and transoms, with a rendered upper stage containing a round window set within a decorative surround, and a projecting domed cap.

The elevation facing Great Underbank has three gables; the right‑hand one has decorative framing and is larger than the pair to the left. The ground floor has paired windows with shallow arched heads and prominent stonework, separated by a corbel that supports an oriel window above. The first and second‑floor windows are mullioned openings with small‑pane sashes of the original pattern. The upper storeys project slightly and have close‑set timber framing, with quatrefoil panels in the gable apex. Stone surrounds are used for the windows in the brick sections, with timber mullions above.

The return to Deanery Way has two gables divided by a chimney breast. Each gable has a shallow‑arched window with stone dressings at ground level, and mullioned sash windows in the rendered upper floors. The attic gables project slightly and have timber framing with mullioned windows. A stone pilaster on one side supports the projection of the left‑hand gable.

Beyond this is a lower wing with a tall central doorway topped by a segmental pediment, flanked by sash windows. The upper floor has similarly tall sash windows with brick surrounds set within rendered walls. Decorative railings and rainwater fittings complete the exterior.

=== Interior ===
A small section of the large bar is encountered on entering. To the right is a seating area with booths and separate tables, finished with timber panelling, while the left side contains another seating area with bare‑brick décor. A further seating area with its own bar is located in the basement, alongside the toilets; styled as the 'Den', this space functions as a sports bar and includes television screens.

== See also ==
- Listed buildings in Stockport
- Listed pubs in Greater Manchester
