= Arden family =

English gentry family

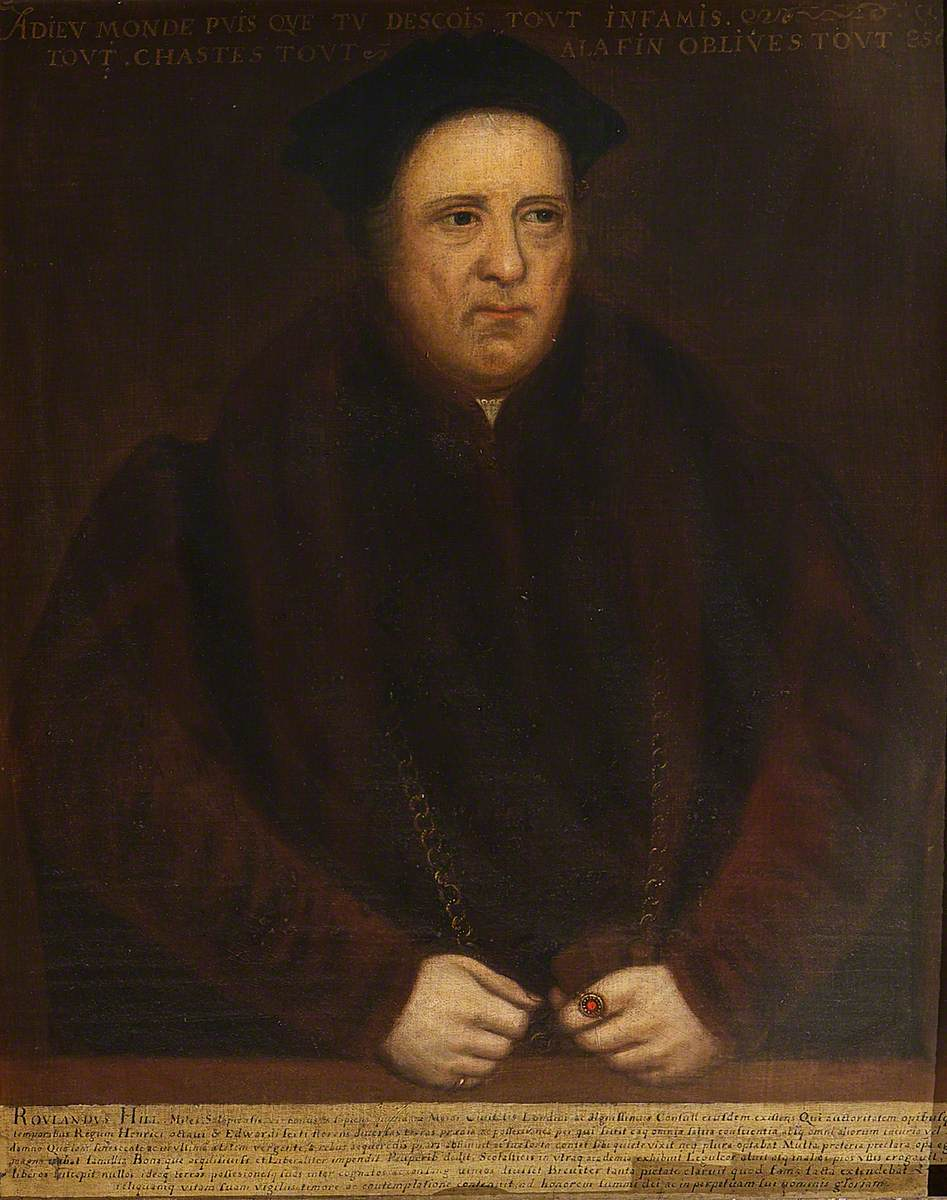
A member of the Arden family married the heiress of Sir Rowland Hill, publisher of the Geneva Bible

The Arden family is an English landed gentry family that can be traced back in the male line to pre-Norman Anglo-Saxon landholders who managed to maintain status after the 1066 invasion of England by the Normans of France. It is one of few families in Britain that can trace its patrilineal descent back to a pre-Norman era Anglo-Saxon ancestor, along with the Berkeley family. Other families make the claim: the Swinton, Wentworth, and the Grindlay families; but their claims are disputed.

The family held lands in Warwickshire, Staffordshire, Worcester, Cheshire and Shropshire. The family shares its name with the Forest of Arden, a culturally defined area ranging across these counties south of Watling Street which is associated with the setting of the action in Shakespeare's play As You Like It.

By the 14th century, under Sir John de Arderne, the most senior line of the Arden family had their primary estate near Solihull at Park Hall, Castle Bromwich. A branch of the Arden family were in Stockport in 1500s at Underbank Hall, Arden Hall (also known as Harden or Hawarden).

Modern scholars Parry and Enis have noted the importance which 16th investigations into the ancestry of the Ardens had for the powerful Dudley family. They needed to either claim ancestry from Turchil, or else their prestigious ancestors had lied in their claims to descend from him, which were bound up with the famous legend of Guy of Warwick, who was supposed to be an ancestor of Turchil, who was the real ancestor of the Ardens at the time of William the Conqueror. According to Parry and Enis, Turchil became "the only Saxon magnate to increase his territories after the Norman conquest" and "the largest landholder in Warwickshire at the time of the Domesday survey".

The Ardens have also often been discussed because of their connection to William Shakespeare, whose mother was an Arden.

== History ==
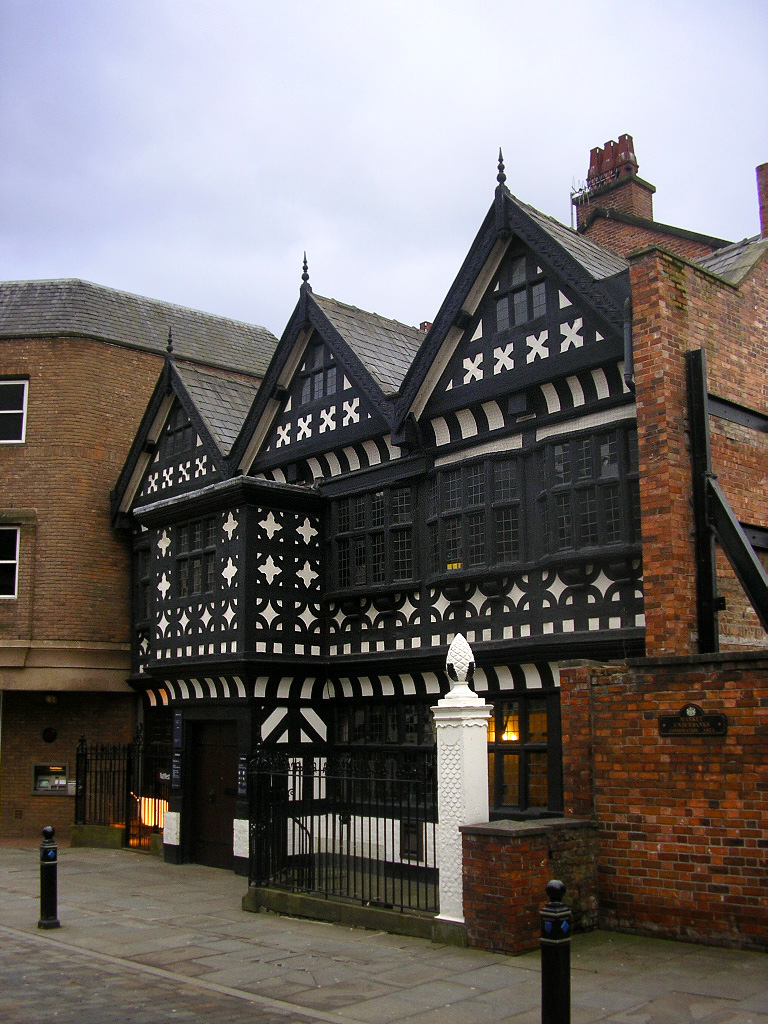
Underbank Hall, an Arden family property of the 1500s in Stockport

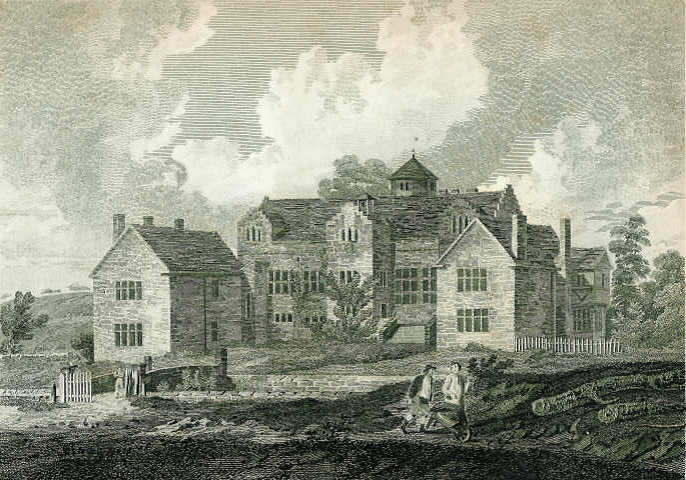
1795 engraving of Harden Hall, Bredbury, another Arden family property near Stockport

Alwin (Æthelwine) was Sheriff of Warwickshire at the time of the Norman Conquest. He was succeeded by his son, Thorkell of Arden (variously spelled Thorkill, Turchil etc.), whose own son and principal heir, Siward, subsequently married Cecilia, and from this union many Arden families descend. Subsequent generations of the family remained prominent in Warwickshire affairs and on many occasions held the shrievalty.

In the thirteenth century the main line of the Ardens was descended from Siward's grandson Thomas, and his family was based in Ratby in Warwickshire. The third Thomas de Arden of Ratby was taken prisoner at the Battle of Evesham. By the end of the century this branch of the family no longer existed, but significant lands had been sold to Thomas Arden of Hanwell and his wife Roesia. Another Arden family continued to hold significant lands from their base in Radbourne.

From the time of Sir Henry de Arden in the 14th century the most prominent Ardens had their primary estate at Park Hall, Castle Bromwich. This family were initially based in the old Arden manors of Curdworth and Minworth in Warwickshire and were descended from Thomas and Roesia.

Robert Arden was executed in 1452 for supporting the uprising of Richard, Duke of York.

Edward Arden of Park Hall, Castle Bromwich, was Sheriff of Warwickshire in 1575 and was the son of William Arden (d. 1545). He was the second cousin of Mary Arden, mother of William Shakespeare. In 1583, he came under suspicion for being head of a family that had remained loyal to the Catholic Church, and was sentenced for allegedly plotting against Elizabeth I. His son, Robert Arden of Park Hall (b. 1553) married Elizabeth Corbett (b. 1551), the great niece and heiress of Sir Rowland Hill (the possible inspiration for the character 'Old Sir Rowland' in As You Like It) daughter of Reginald Corbett.

Edward's great-grandson Robert died unmarried and without issue in 1643, bringing the Park Hall male line to an end. Edward’s uncle, Simon Arden, Sheriff of Warwickshire (1569), continued the senior line of family gentry through Longcroft Hall, in Yoxall, Staffordshire. George Philip Arden of Longcroft died in 1997, bringing an end to the continuous senior male line.

A branch of the Arden family were in Stockport in 1500s at Underbank Hall, Arden Hall (also known as Harden or Hawarden).

A collection of papers in Manchester University Library, The Arderne Deeds, comprise muniments of the Arderne family of Alvanley, Cheshire, and the related Done family of Utkinton, Cheshire, and their estates. Further papers concerning the Cheshire Ardens are in the UK National Archive. There was a discussion about the links between the Cheshire and the Warwickshire Ardens in print in the 19th century.

== See also ==
- Arden (name)
- Arden, Warwickshire
- List of monarchs of Mercia
- Baron Alvanley, of Alvanley in Cheshire, a title created in 1801 for senior judge Richard Pepper Arden and which passed to his sons in turn then became extinct.
