= Stockport Heritage =

Stockport Heritage was formed by volunteers in 1987 as a campaigning conservation group to help preserve and regenerate historic and architecturally sensitive buildings in the Metropolitan Borough of Stockport, Greater Manchester, England.

== History and description ==
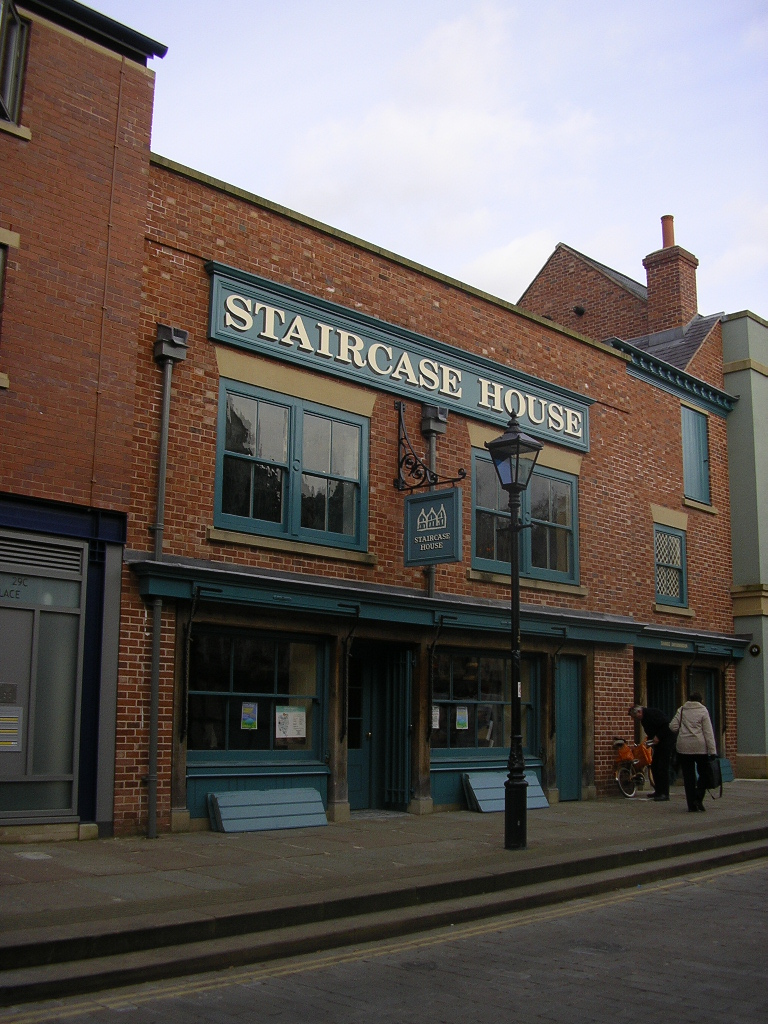
Staircase House was the group's initial focus of activity

Its main work focussed on Staircase House, a 15th-century merchants' warehouse and home with later additions, which had been semi-derelict for a number of years on Stockport's 750-year-old Market Place. The group successfully opposed plans to demolish the house.

Stockport Heritage was granted charitable status in 1988, and was renamed Stockport Heritage Trust. The objective of persuading the local civic authorities to take up the Staircase House project was achieved and the house became the flagship of a regeneration scheme for the historic town centre. The house opened to the public in 2005, after a £4 million restoration by Stockport Metropolitan Borough Council, as a restored historic town house (Staircase House itself) and the town's museum of local history (The Stockport Story Museum) – thus giving the borough two heritage sites under the same roof.

In 2001, Stockport Heritage Trust sponsored a Stockport friendship link with Dodge City, Kansas, in consideration of the many American descendants of the Dodge family, who emigrated from Offerton (DNA evidence from December 2015 conflicts with this assertion), in the Parish of Stockport, in the 17th century. Members of the Dodge Family Association (DFA) regularly visit their ancestral homes in Stockport, one of which is Staircase House (however DFA now considers East Coker, Somerset, to be the ancestral home of the Dodges in the United States).

Starting in 1992, Stockport Heritage Trust initiated a blue plaque programme commemorating various sites in the town including the birthplace of John Bradshaw, the republican regicide and Lord President of the Council of State of the puritan Commonwealth of 1649–53. The commemorative plaques now record sites and people throughout the town centre and a blue plaque trail was launched in 2007.

Since 1999, Stockport Heritage Trust volunteers have run a free heritage centre open to the public on market days in the part-13th/14th century Parish Church on the Market Place. This building has also been the subject of a multimillion-pound restoration scheme. Alongside their changing exhibitions the Heritage Trust have an archive of several thousand local images accessible to visitors and trust members produce books, videos, pamphlets and a local Stockport Heritage Magazine. They are also involved in events, giving walks, talks and outreach on local heritage, including civic award schemes and committees on tourism and conservation.

== See also ==
- South Trafford Archaeological Group
- Stockport Heritage Magazine
