= Underbank =

Area of Stockport, Greater Manchester, England

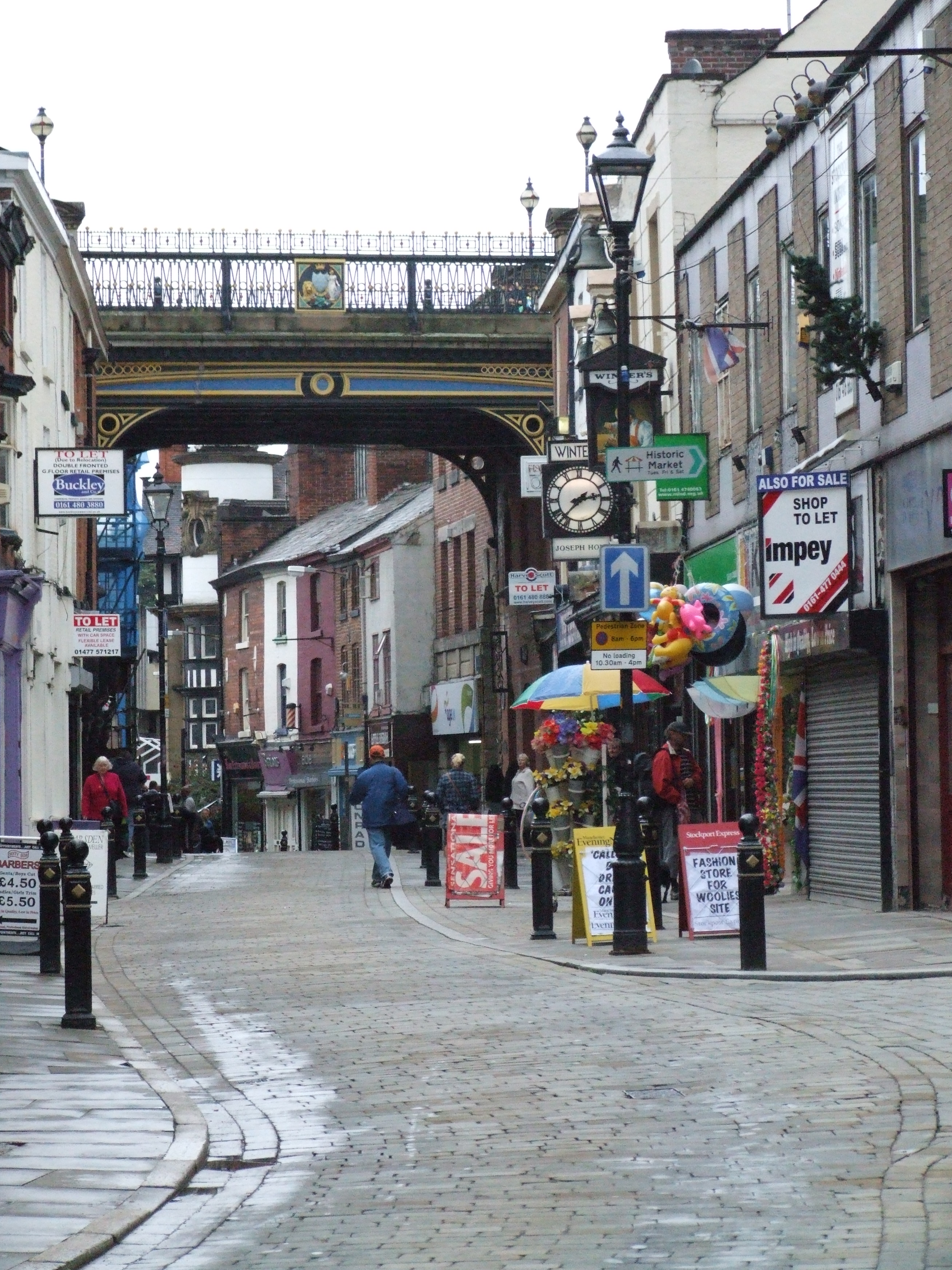
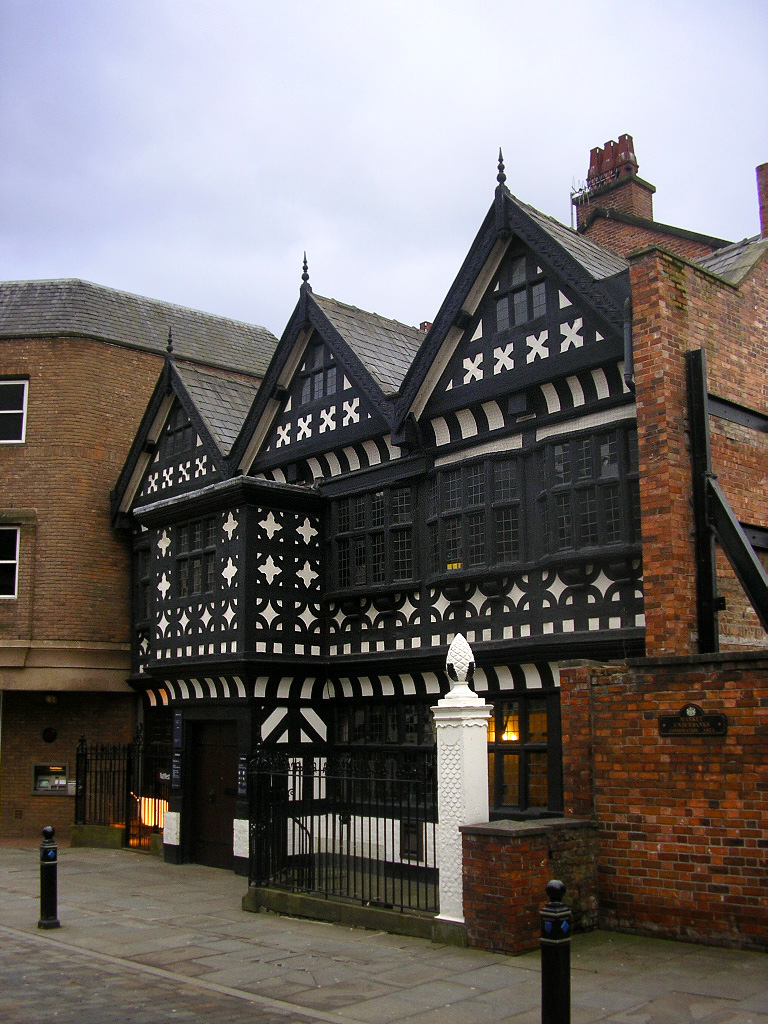
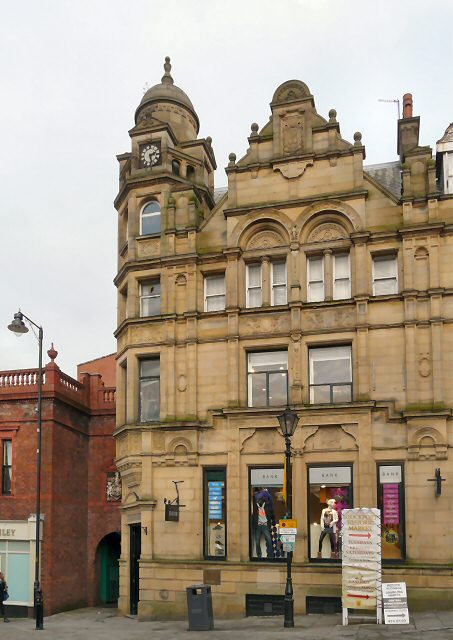
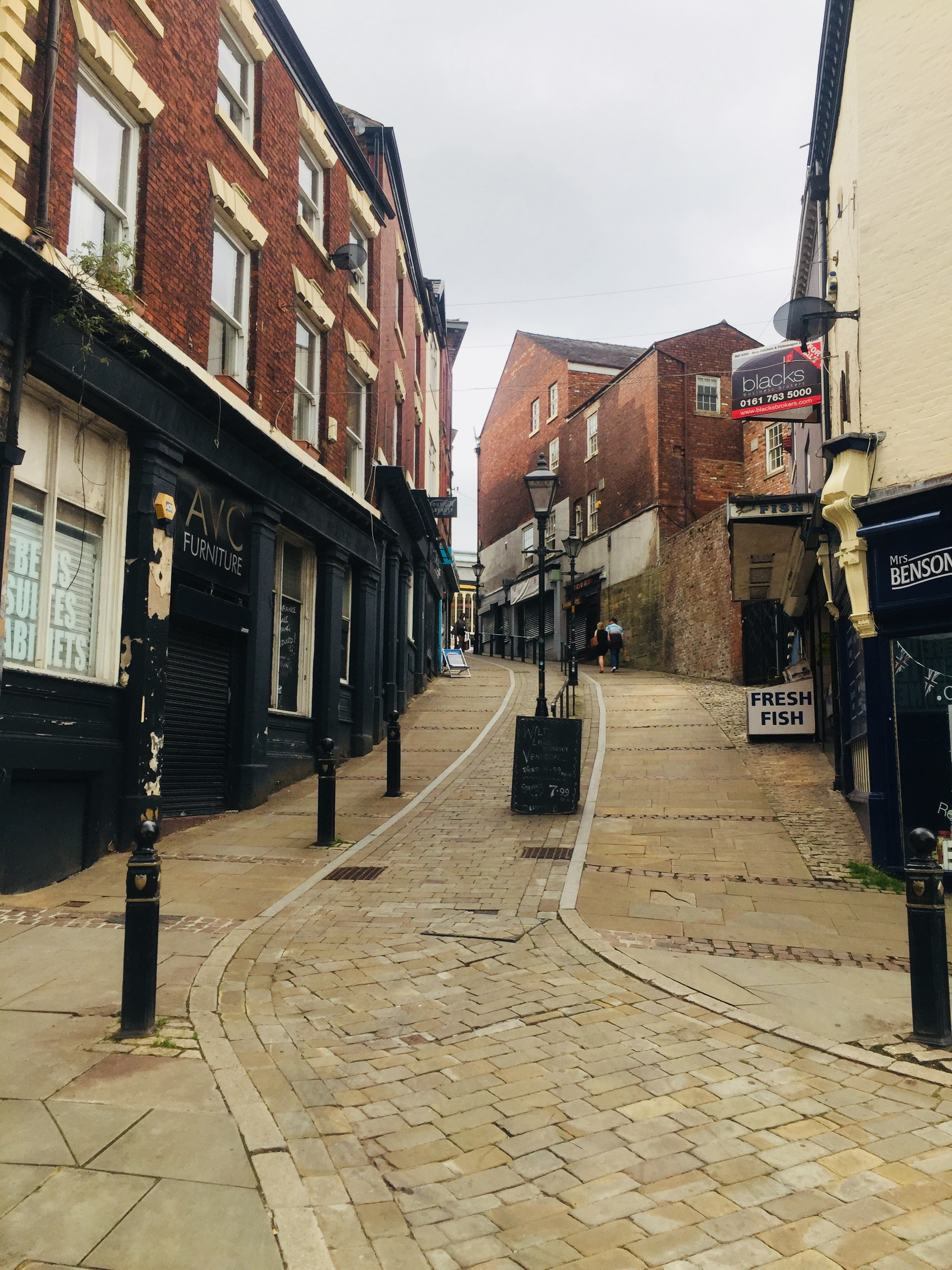
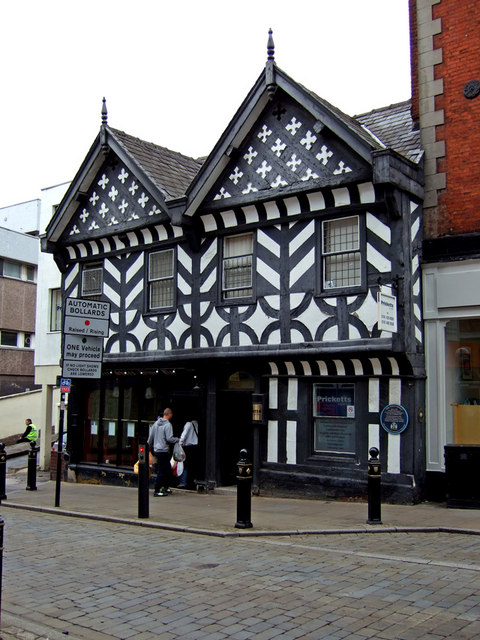
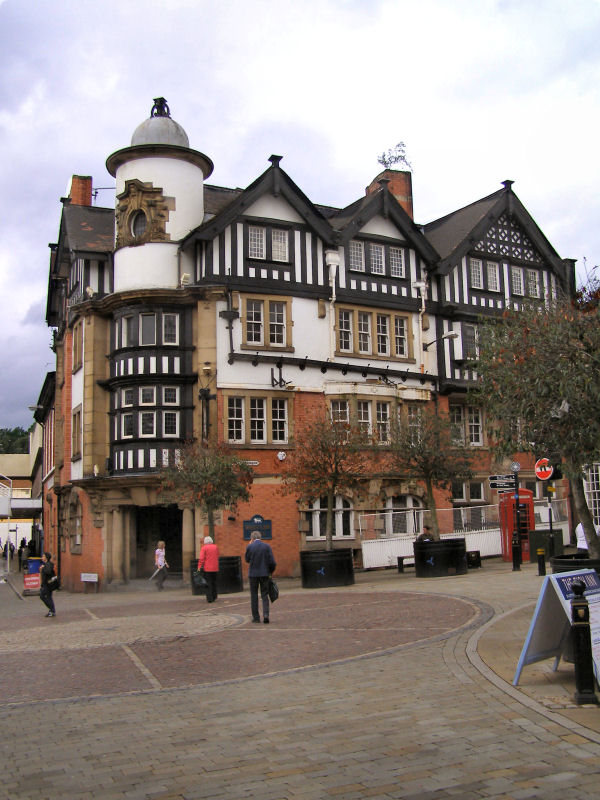
- Top from left: Little Underbank; Underbank Hall. Middle from left: Union Bank of Manchester; Great Underbank. Bottom from left: The Three Shires; White Lion Hotel.
- OS grid reference: SJ8955090549
- Metropolitan borough: Stockport
- Metropolitan county: Greater Manchester
- Region: North West
- Country: England
- Sovereign state: United Kingdom
- Post town: STOCKPORT
- Postcode district: SK1
- UK Parliament: Stockport

The Underbank is an area of Stockport, Greater Manchester, England, containing the streets of Little Underbank and Great Underbank. Originally considered the finest shopping street in Stockport during the 19th century, the street was dubbed as Stockport's answer to the Soho district of London following an influx of independent businesses in the 2010s.

The Underbank began to be developed when the increased use of wheeled transport necessitated a practical route from the brow to the nearby Roman road, facilitating traffic to London for over 400 years. The rapid expansion of the town following the Industrial Revolution lead to increased development from the late 18th century. By the 19th century, Little Underbank contained a prestigious shopping district, with over 30 shops of various trades such as hosiers, milliners and curriers.

Since 1974, the Underbank has been included in the Market and Underbanks conservation area. Following a £1.8 million grant from the National Lottery Heritage Fund in 2017, Stockport Metropolitan Borough Council (SMBC) launched the 'Rediscovering the Underbanks' project, regenerating the area following neglect in favour of the nearby Merseyway Shopping Centre.

== History ==
The area which would later house the Underbank was formed by the Hempshaw Brook cutting a valley along its southwestern side, eroding the natural red sandstone.

The Great Underbank and Little Underbank roads came about due to the proliferation of wheeled transport necessitating a practical route to the Roman road nearby the market.

The White Lion pub traces its licence on Great Underbank to the 15th century; the existing building, however, is a 1904 rebuild and was originally a coaching inn. The inn's proximity to the River Mersey led to the belief that visitors were permitted to fish for salmon from the beer garden, and to use the inn's pew at the nearby St Mary's Church.

Underbank Hall was built in the late 15th century to serve as a townhouse for the Arderne family of Bredbury. A similar town house was eventually known as The Three Shires was built in 1580 for the Leghs of Adlington.

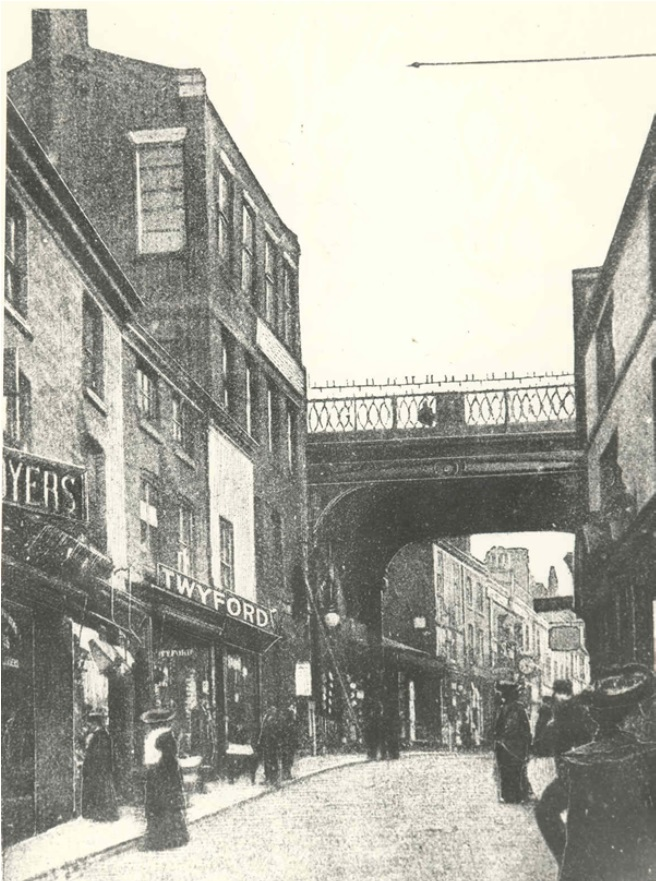
Little Underbank in 1906

The Industrial Revolution led to rapid expansion in the area. Brick buildings began to replace the earlier timber frame in the late 18th century, and by the 19th century Little Underbank would contain a prestigious shopping district. Bench jeweler Jacob Winter would move his premises to the Underbank from nearby Lower Hillgate. Winter's jewellers would become notable for its clock, and hydraulically operated security features.

The Underbank began to suffer from neglect, with traders complaining that the area was neglected in favour of Merseyway Shopping Centre, which opened in 1965. Other complaints included the lack of street lighting, parking spaces, and its untidy state. The area would become part of the newly-designated Market and Underbanks conservation area in 1974.

In 2017 a grant of £1.8 million was secured through the National Lottery Heritage Fund, allowing Stockport Metropolitan Borough Council and the Stockport Heritage Trust to pursue the 'Rediscovering the Underbanks' project, aimed at breathing new life into the area. The streets' cobblestones were repaired, and buildings in the area were restored and refurbished. The area would also see an influx of independent businesses, leading the area to be coined as 'Stockport's Soho'.

== Landmarks ==
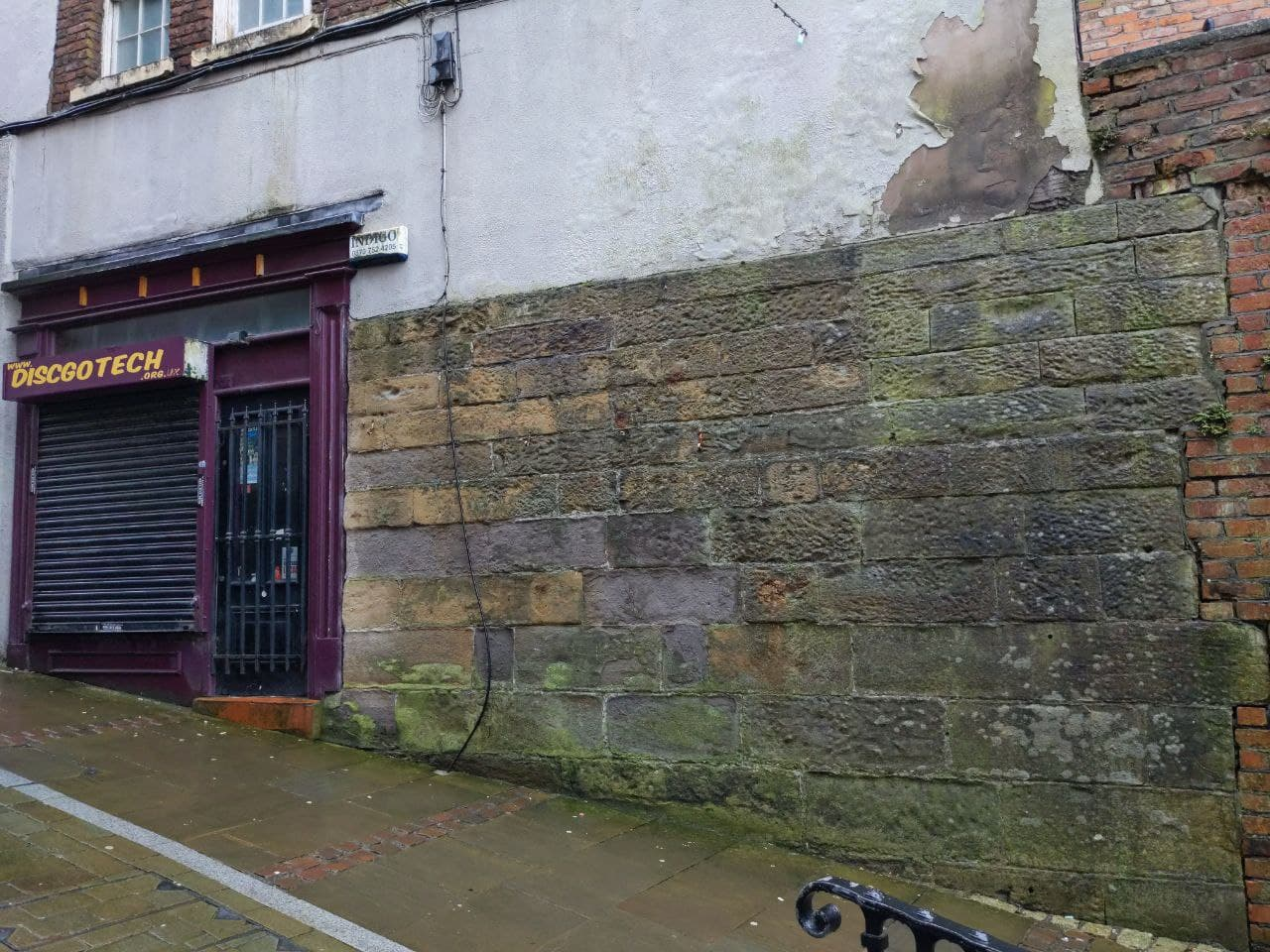
Medieval town wall in 2021

The Underbank contains many historic listed buildings, including the remnants of the medieval town wall, the Tudor Underbank Hall and Three Shires Hall, and a number of Victorian buildings.

== In popular culture ==
The Underbank was used as a filming location for the 2019 BBC One television sitcom Scarborough, for the Geraldine's of Scarborough hair salon.

The 2020 Netflix eight-part mystery thriller television series The Stranger also featured the Underbank.
