= Merseyway Shopping Centre =

Shopping centre in Stockport, Greater Manchester, England

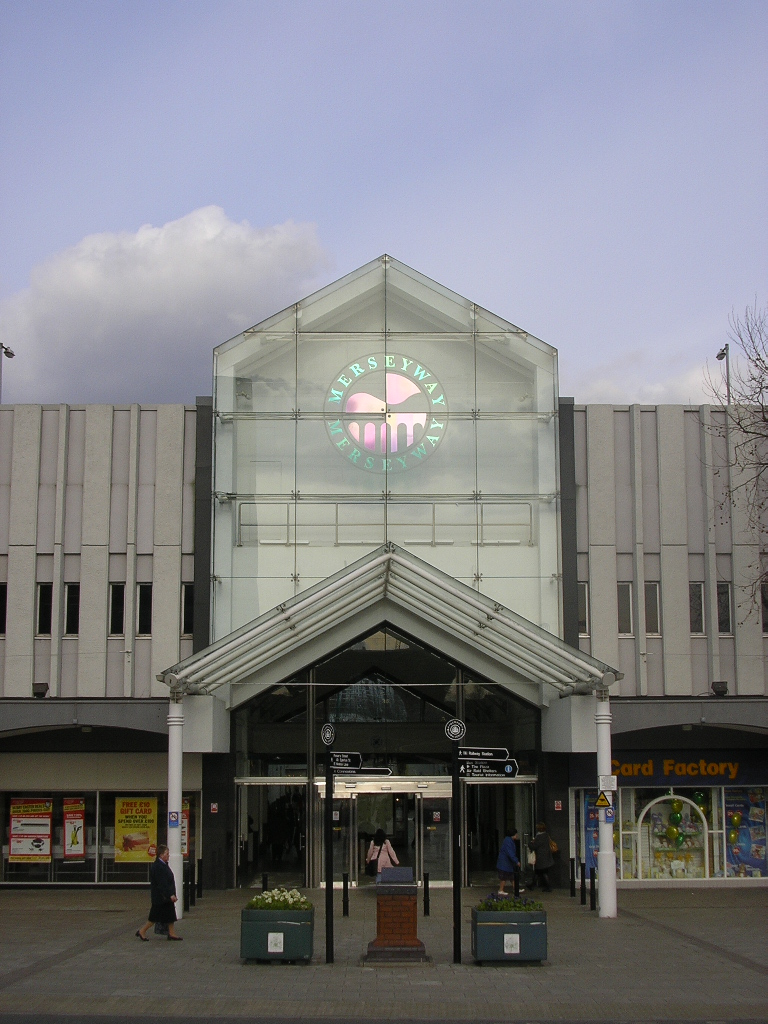
- The centre's main entrance from Mersey Square in 2008
- Location: Stockport, Greater Manchester, England
- Coordinates: 53°24′40″N 2°09′33″W
- Address: 52–54 Great Underbank
- Opened: 1970; 56 years ago
- Developer: Hammerson
- Manager: CBRE
- Owner: Stockport Metropolitan Borough Council (SMBC)
- Num. of stores: 95
- Num. of anchor tenants: 3
- Floor area: 32,050 m^{2} (345,000 sq ft)
- Floors: 2
- Parking: 835 spaces
- Website: merseyway.com

Merseyway Shopping Centre is a shopping centre in Stockport, Greater Manchester, England. Some of it has been redeveloped for various other uses.

== Name ==
The source of the centre's name, Merseyway, is disputed. The shopping centre was built over a 1930s road called Merseyway which ran above and along the River Mersey. The river's name itself could be the source, as it runs for 400 metres (1,300 ft) underneath the centre.

== History ==
The centre was developed by Hammerson, with construction starting in 1965. It opened in 1970 as one of the first shopping centres in the United Kingdom. Since then, it has undergone considerable development. It was purchased by Stockport Metropolitan Borough Council (SMBC) in April 2016.

In 2017 the Merseyway car park to the north of the centre (between Princes Street and the M60 motorway) was developed as the Light cinema and Redrock leisure centre.

At the beginning of 2022, it was announced that portions of the Merseyway's Adlington Walk would be repurposed to add additional facilities and a new library. Funding for the project was allocated by the government's Future High Streets Fund.

In 2023 SMBC appointed local contractors to construct the 'Merseyway Innovation Centre' on vacant upper floors of the shopping centre, to create workspaces for up to 50 businesses. The Merseyway's façade would also undergo renovation.

== Gallery ==
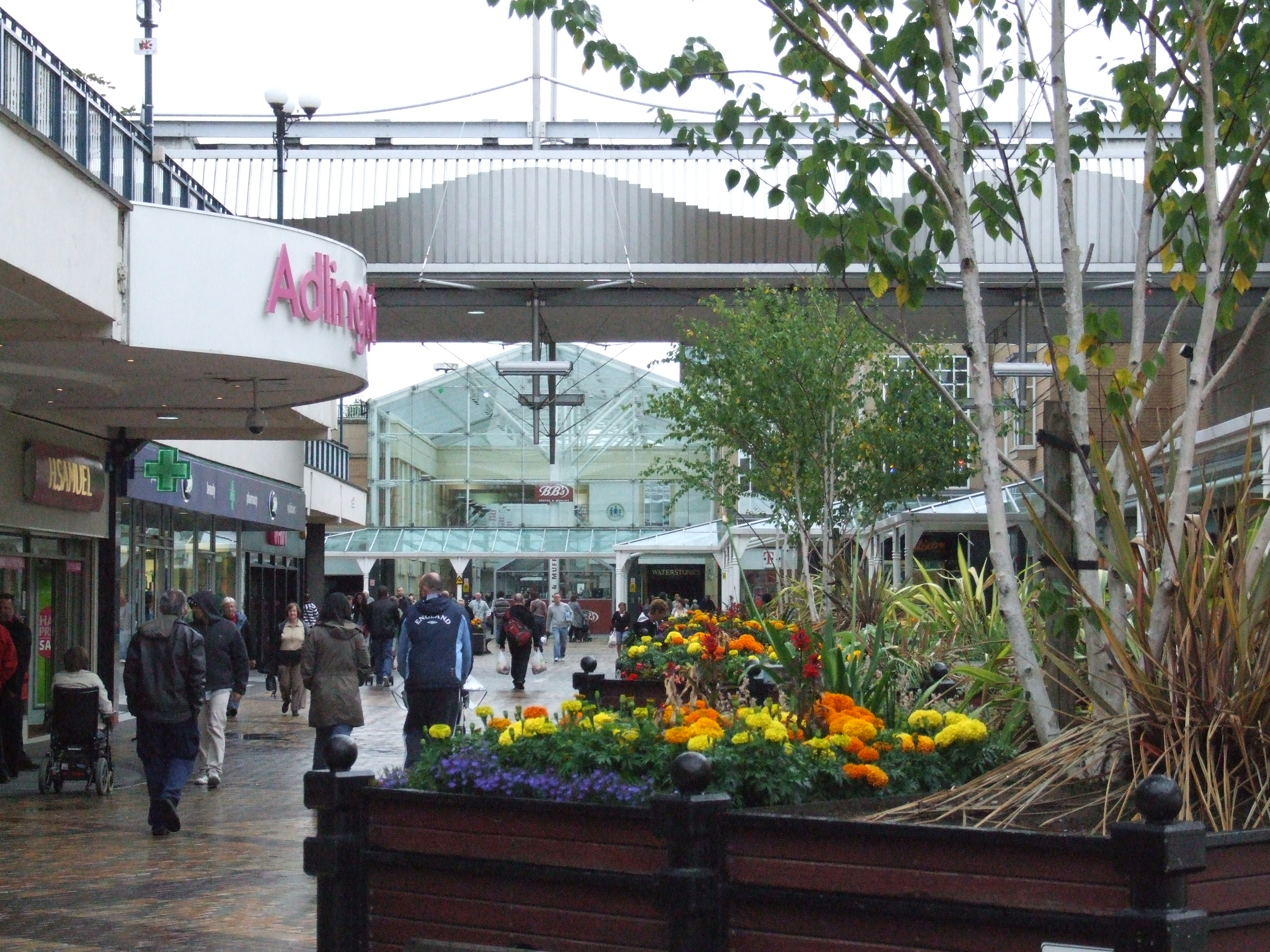
Merseyway Shopping Centre in 2010

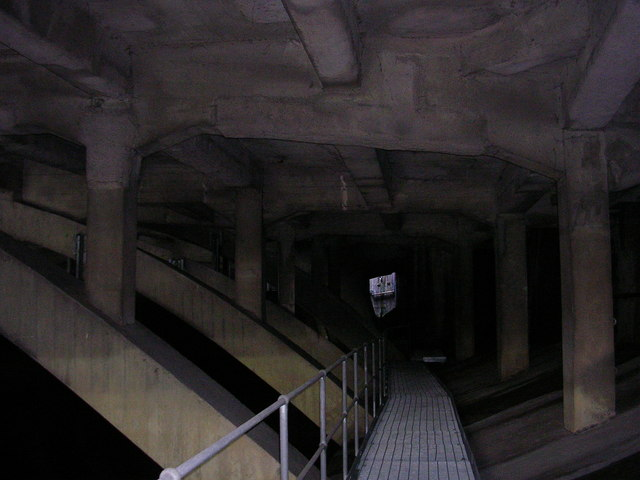
Some of the supports beneath Merseyway, 2008
