= Staircase House =

Medieval building and museum in Stockport, England

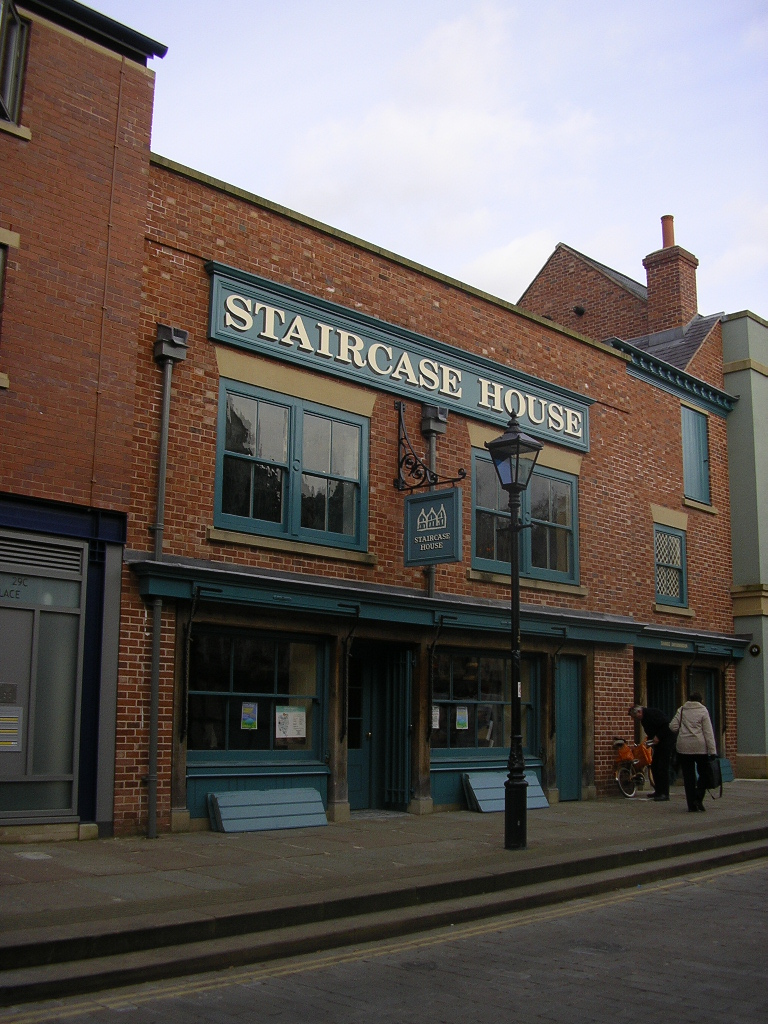
- The main entrance to Staircase House from the Market Place in 2008

- Location within Greater Manchester

General information
- Architectural style: Medieval
- Location: Market Place, Stockport, Greater Manchester, England
- Coordinates: 53.4123°N 2.154221°W
- Year built: c. 1460; 566 years ago
- Renovated: 16th century (rebuilt and enlarged); Early 17th century (probable, altered and enlarged); 18th century (remodelled); 19th and 20th centuries (altered)

Design and construction
- Designations

Listed Building – Grade II*
- Official name: Staircase House
- Designated: 27 April 1992
- Reference no.: 1356855

Website
- Official website

Staircase House, at 30/30A Market Place, also known as Stockport Museum and formerly known as Stockport Story Museum, is a Grade II* listed medieval building dating from around 1460 in Stockport, historically in Cheshire and now within Greater Manchester, England. The house is notable for its rare Jacobean cage newel staircase.

== History ==
=== 15th–19th centuries ===
Staircase House (grid reference SJ897906), is in its origins a cruck timber building, with its earliest known surviving timbers dating from 1459 to 1460 on the basis of dendrochronology. Very little is known of the property's early history, though it is thought that it may have been the home of William Dodge who, in 1483, was the mayor of Stockport.

The first residents of whom there is certainty were the Shallcross family who owned the house from 1605 to 1730. Members of the landed gentry, with their seat just across the county boundary, in Derbyshire, it was they who in 1618 installed the distinctive Jacobean cage newel staircase, from which the house takes its modern name. The staircase has some unusual features, such as the carving covering much of the woodwork.

The characteristic of a cage newel staircase, is that each of its newel posts extends throughout the full height of the staircase, the four posts and the banisters thus forming a stairwell which is not fully enclosed, but rather contained within a cage-like structure. In fact, at Staircase House, at some date before the first surviving descriptions of the staircase in the 19th century, the newel posts were each sawn through, just below the stringer board and just above the handrail. That may have been done as a response to changing tastes, or possibly to overcome the practical difficulties of moving large objects, such as furniture, about the house.

=== 20th century ===
In its later years in private ownership, the house was used partly as the Staircase Café until 1989, and into the 1990s as storage for Gardner's Green Grocery and Fruit stall which stood in the market, immediately in front of the house itself.

Following a major fire in 1995, the house, including the staircase, was restored using traditional materials, tools and techniques; the second of two arson attacks on the semi-derelict building. The restoration was undertaken by Stockport Metropolitan Borough Council, after having compulsorily purchased the property, following a long and persistent campaign to save it by a local conservation group, the Stockport Heritage Trust, beginning in 1987.

The trust, local volunteers, argued that the house was a unique survival and should be preserved and, on that basis, it dissuaded the council from demolishing the building as a dangerous structure as had been previously proposed. Stockport Heritage Trust financed tree-ring dating establishing the date of the earliest remaining parts of the house as 1460. They commissioned the first measured architectural survey of the building and were successful in pressing for it to be upgraded officially from its Grade II designation in 1975 to a Grade II* listed building in 1992.

=== Stockport Museum ===
Now open to the public, Staircase House offers an insight into the life of medieval and Renaissance Stockport, the origins of the town, its development as a borough and market town, and the subsequent phases of the house's evolution up to the 1940s, when it was last used as a private dwelling.

It forms part of Stockport Museum, whose collections include objects and displays from the Palaeolithic period, the Mellor Iron Age hilltop settlement, medieval Stockport, the local Victorian textile industry, the impact of the First World War, Strawberry Studios, and the history of sport in the town.

== See also ==
- Grade II* listed buildings in Greater Manchester
- Hat Works, the UK's only dedicated hatting museum, located in Stockport
- Listed buildings in Stockport
- Stockport Air Raid Shelters, now part of Stockport's museum service
