= Moseley Hall =

Moseley Hall can refer to:

- Moseley Hall, Birmingham, now Moseley Hall Hospital
- Moseley Old Hall, Wolverhampton
- Moseley Old Hall, Cheadle
