= Albion Warehouse =

Listed building in Ashton-under-Lyne, Greater Manchester, England

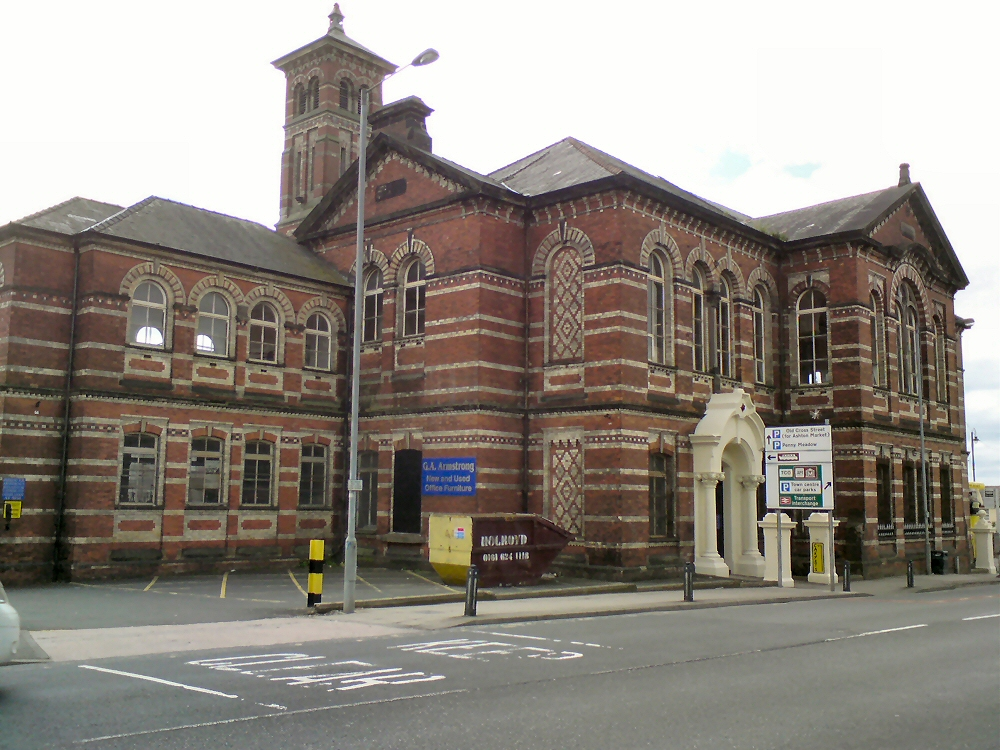
- Albion Warehouse in 2016

- Location within Greater Manchester
- Alternative names: The Albion

General information
- Architectural style: Italianate
- Location: Penny Meadow, Ashton-under-Lyne, Greater Manchester, England
- Coordinates: 53.50014°N 2.11168°W
- Year built: 1861–62

Listed Building – Grade II*
- Official name: Albion Warehouse
- Designated: 12 January 1967
- Reference no.: 1068001

Albion Warehouse (also known as The Albion) is a Grade II* listed building on Penny Meadow in Ashton-under-Lyne, a town within Tameside, Greater Manchester, England. Originally constructed as a Sunday school in the mid-19th century, the building later served various functions and is now an office furniture warehouse.

== History ==
The foundation stone for the Albion Sunday School was laid on Good Friday, 1861, by Hugh Mason, then mayor of Ashton-under-Lyne and a prominent local mill owner. The building was completed and opened on Good Friday, 1862, and was reputedly the largest Sunday school in England at the time. It featured an assembly hall capable of seating over 1,000 people, a lecture theatre, an infants' room, and 11 classrooms. In 1869 it also began operating as a day school and celebrated its golden jubilee in 1912. The school closed in 1926.

On 12 January 1967, Albion Warehouse was designated a Grade II* listed building. Over the years, the building has served various purposes, including as a labour exchange, an army recruitment office, and a carpet warehouse. Since 1996 it has been occupied by Armstrongs Office Furniture as its head office.

== Architecture ==
Albion Warehouse is constructed in polychromatic brick with ashlar dressings and a slate roof. It comprises 11 bays and two storeys, with projecting stair wings to the rear and a lower four-bay wing to the left. The design follows the Italianate style, featuring a projecting plinth, a first-floor band, white brick striations, and a bracketed eaves cornice.

Both the front and rear elevations are dominated by a central three-bay projection, which is pedimented and includes a round-arched two-light window with tracery on the first floor. At the rear, this projection is flanked by stair wings that extend further and are also pedimented. On the front elevation, either side of the central projection are elaborate ashlar door surrounds, incorporating columns with foliated capitals, a semi-circular hood, and a dropped keystone.

Windows are symmetrically arranged: the ground floor features eight-pane casements with segmental brick-arched heads and keystones, while the first floor has semi-circular heads with an impost band and polychromatic voussoirs. The building has a hipped roof, and each end is marked by a pedimented projection. A decorative tower, styled like a campanile with a pyramidal roof, rises above the structure.

The adjoining boundary wall includes decorative cast-iron railings (removed on the east side) mounted on a stone plinth, with gate posts. Internally, the first floor contains a hall with arched bracing to queen-post roof trusses, along with surviving timber, cast-iron, and plasterwork details.

== See also ==
- Grade II* listed buildings in Greater Manchester
- Listed buildings in Ashton-under-Lyne
