= Church of St Martin, Marple =

Church in Greater Manchester, England

Church of St Martin
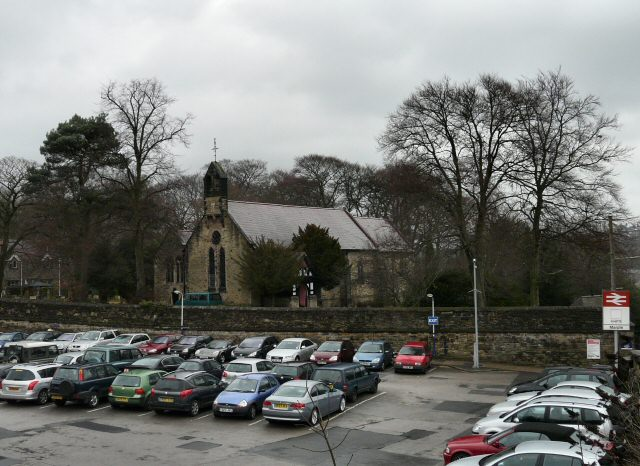
- Church of St Martin, Marple

- Location within Greater Manchester

Location
- Location: Brabyns Brow, Marple, Greater Manchester, England
- Coordinates: 53.40096°N 2.05637°W

Architecture
- Architect: J. D. Sedding
- Type: Church
- Completed: 1870
- Materials: Stone with ashlar dressings, clay tile roof and timber framed porch

Website
- stmartins-lowmarple.co.uk

The Church of St Martin is a 19th-century church on Brabyns Brow in Marple, a town within the Metropolitan Borough of Stockport, Greater Manchester, England (grid reference SJ963894).

It was designed by J. D. Sedding for Maria Anne Hudson (1819–1906), who lived in nearby Brabyns Hall, and was built between 1869 and 1870. The north chapel and aisle were added later by Henry Wilson, in 1895–96 and 1909 respectively. The stained glass in the windows in the chancel are by the Morris company with designs by Edward Burne-Jones, Dante Gabriel Rossetti, Ford Madox Brown and William Morris. The organ from 1870 is by Henry Willis.

On 11 October 1985, it was designated a Grade II* listed building. To the rear is a former schoolroom and schoolmaster's house, now a parish hall and private house, designed by Sedding's brother Edmund Sedding and separately listed at Grade II.

== See also ==
- Grade II* listed buildings in Greater Manchester
- List of churches in Greater Manchester
- Listed buildings in Marple, Greater Manchester
