= Southern Railway Viaduct and Colonnade =

Listed structure in Salford, England

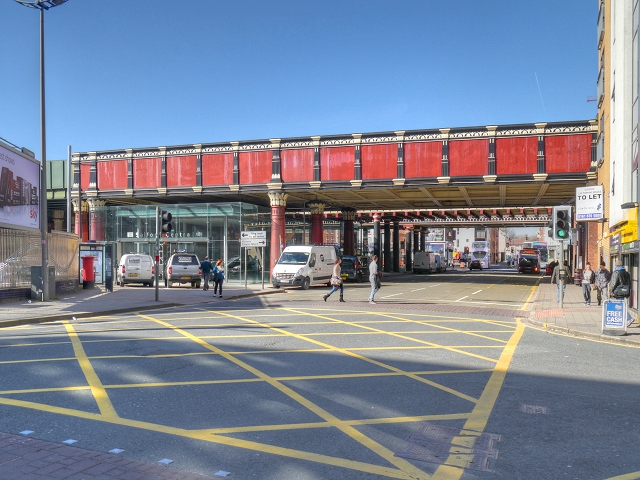
- The viaduct in 2014

- Location within Greater Manchester

General information
- Location: New Bailey Street, Salford, England
- Coordinates: 53.4829°N 2.2544°W
- Year built: 1844; 182 years ago
- Client: Liverpool and Manchester Railway

Design and construction
- Engineer: Sir John Hawkshaw

Listed Building – Grade II*
- Official name: Southern Railway Viaduct and Colonnade
- Designated: 18 January 1980
- Reference no.: 1386162

The Southern Railway Viaduct and Colonnade is a Grade II* listed structure on New Bailey Street in Ordsall, a suburb within Salford, England. It forms part of the historic railway infrastructure near Salford Central railway station and is notable for its distinctive cast-iron architecture and ornamental detailing.

== History ==
The viaduct was constructed in 1844 for the Liverpool and Manchester Railway, one of the pioneering railway companies of the early Victorian era. The design was overseen by Sir John Hawkshaw, a prominent civil engineer known for his work on major railway projects during the period of rapid railway expansion often referred to as "Railway Mania".

The structure was built to carry railway lines over New Bailey Street, connecting routes into Manchester. It is one of three adjacent bridges at Salford Central, each built by different companies, reflecting the competitive nature of early railway development. The Southern Viaduct is the southernmost of these bridges, with the others constructed for the Lancashire and Yorkshire Railway and later additions for the Manchester, Bolton and Bury Railway.

On 18 January 1980, Southern Railway Viaduct and Colonnade was designated a Grade II* listed structure.

== Architecture ==
The viaduct is characterised by cast-iron columns supporting I-section girders and a cast-iron parapet. The columns incorporate Egyptian lotus flower capitals, a motif common in mid-19th-century industrial design. The parapet is largely plain but becomes more elaborately detailed over New Bailey Street, where it is divided by fluted pilasters with acanthus capitals and an enriched frieze.

== See also ==
- Grade II* listed buildings in Greater Manchester
- Listed buildings in Salford
