= Lawrence Buildings =

Listed building in Manchester, England

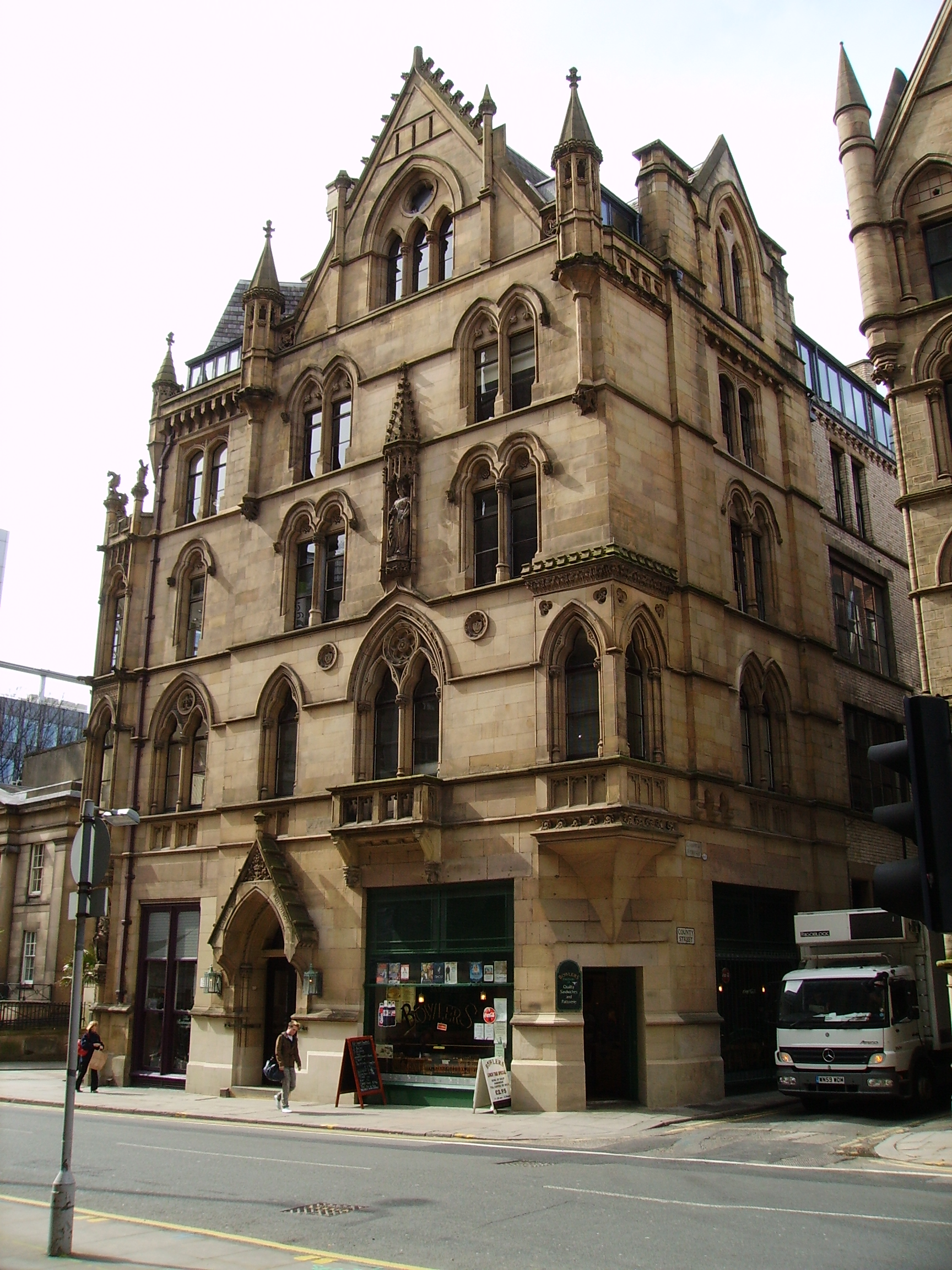
- Lawrence Buildings viewed from Mount Street in 2011

- Location within Greater Manchester

General information
- Type: Commercial, offices
- Architectural style: Gothic Revival
- Location: Central Street, Manchester, England
- Coordinates: 53.4786°N 2.2455°W
- Year built: 1874
- Client: Inland Revenue

Technical details
- Material: Sandstone ashlar

Design and construction
- Architecture firm: Pennington and Bridgen
- Other designers: Williams and Millson (sculpture)
- Main contractor: William Southern
- Designations

Listed Building – Grade II*
- Official name: Lawrence Buildings
- Designated: 3 October 1974
- Reference no.: 1220257

The Lawrence Buildings is a Victorian office block on the corner of Central Street and Mount Street in Manchester, England. Built in 1874 for the Inland Revenue to designs by Pennington and Bridgen, with William Southern as main contractor and carvings by Williams and Millson, it was designated a Grade II* listed building in 1974. As of July 2026, the ground floor is now occupied by a sports bar and a restaurant, with the upper floors used by a flexible office‑space company.

== History ==
The building was constructed in 1874, according to its official listing. It was designed by Pennington and Bridgen of Manchester and London in the Gothic Revival style, and commissioned by the Inland Revenue for use as their offices, with William Southern as the main contractor and the sculptural carvings carried out by Williams and Millson.

On 3 October 1974, the Lawrence Buildings was designated a Grade II* listed building.

As of July 2026, the ground floor is occupied by a sports bar and a restaurant, and the upper floors are used by the flexible office-space company incspaces.

The Lawrence Buildings forms a group with the Grade II listed St Andrew's Chambers, to the right, in a similar style.

== Architecture ==
The building is constructed of dressed sandstone with a slate roof. It has a rectangular footprint on the end of a block and is designed in a highly decorative Gothic style. It rises four storeys with attic rooms and presents an uneven five‑window front to Mount Street, including a chamfered corner on the left. This front has horizontal bands at sill level, a three‑sided corner feature with a corbelled base, small corner turrets and a slate‑covered spirelet, and a tall gable on the right with similar turret details. The main entrance sits in the centre beneath a steep canopy, with a pointed arch and altered windows on either side.

The upper floors have pointed arched windows of one or two lights, with shaped tracery and moulded surrounds, and the second floor includes a niche containing a statue of Queen Victoria under a carved canopy. At the left corner is another pointed arched doorway with shafts, carved detailing and a moulded surround, flanked by "a lion and a unicorn on pedestals, with an elaborate two-storey oriel window above".

The five‑bay return elevation to Central Street continues in the same style and has a central gable. The roof is steeply pitched, with low dormer windows and tall chimney stacks.

== See also ==
- Grade II* listed buildings in Greater Manchester
- Listed buildings in Manchester-M2

== Bibliography ==
- Hartwell, Clare (2001), Manchester, Pevsner Architectural Guides, London: Penguin, ISBN 0-14-071131-7
