= Estate Exchange =

Listed building in Manchester, England

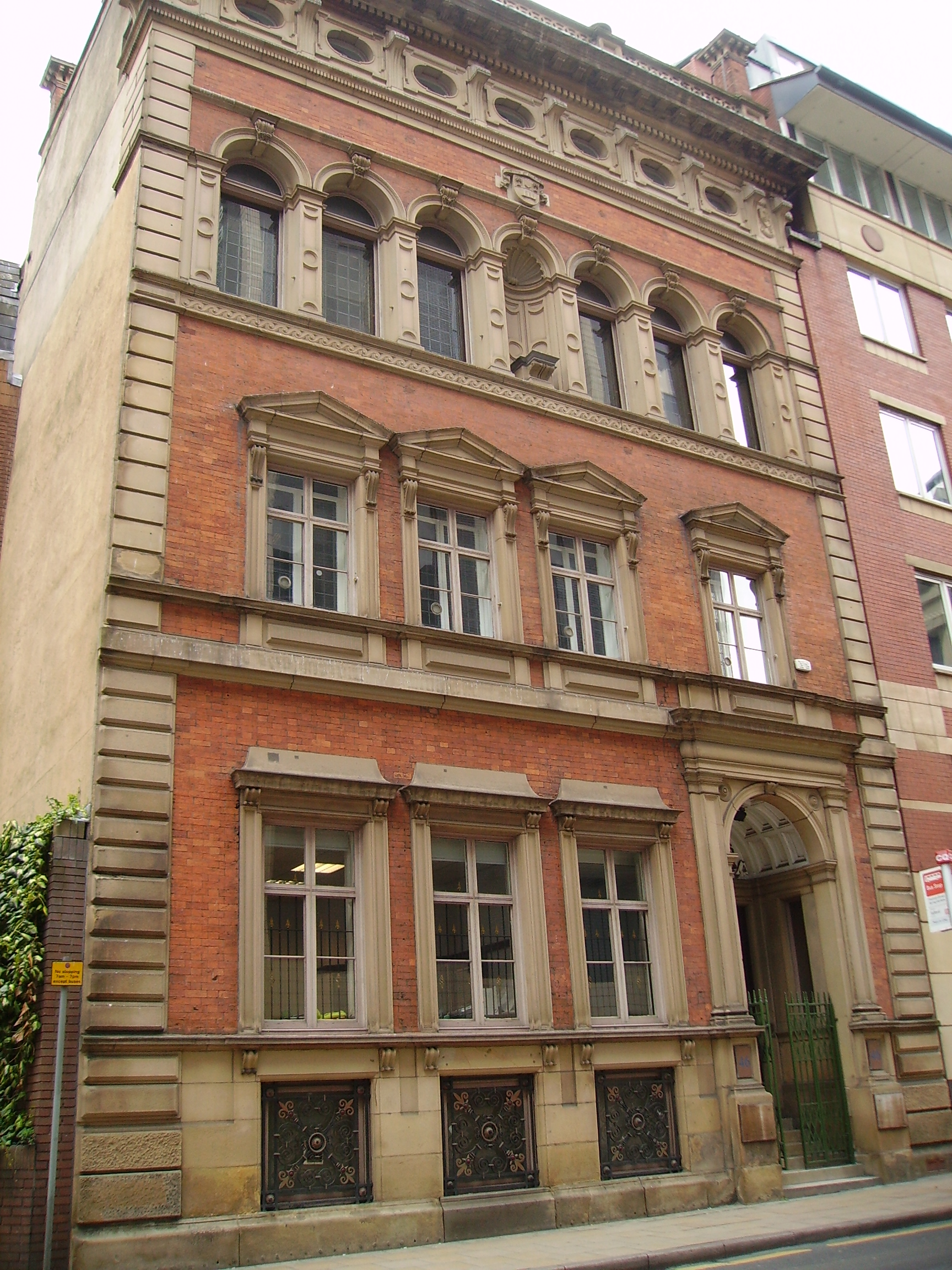
- Estate Exchange in 2011

- Location within Greater Manchester

General information
- Architectural style: Italianate palazzo
- Location: Fountain Street, Manchester, England
- Coordinates: 53.4806°N 2.2411°W
- Year built: 1852
- Renovated: 1858 (floors added)
- Client: Overseers and Churchwardens

Design and construction
- Architect: Thomas Worthington
- Designations

Listed Building – Grade II*
- Official name: Estate Exchange
- Designated: 3 October 1974
- Reference no.: 1200835

The Estate Exchange is a Grade II* listed Victorian office block on Fountain Street in Manchester, England. Designed by Thomas Worthington, it was built in 1852 for the Overseers' and Churchwardens' Offices, with two additional floors added in 1858. The building later became part of the Upper King Street conservation area and is now used as solicitors' offices.

== History ==
The building was constructed in 1852 as offices for the Overseers and Churchwardens, according to its official listing. It was designed by Thomas Worthington, who also designed the two additional floors added in 1858.

In 1970 the site was included within the newly designated Upper King Street conservation area, and on 3 October 1974, the Estate Exchange was designated a Grade II* listed building.

As of July 2026, the building is used as solicitors' offices.

== Architecture ==
The building is constructed in red brick with sandstone detailing and has a slate roof. It has a rectangular plan and is designed in an Italianate palazzo style. The front elevation has four windows and rises three storeys above a basement and attic, with the upper two floors added in 1858. It features channelled corner pilasters, a stone basement, sill bands at each level, a stone attic stage, a prominent cornice with brackets, and a pierced parapet with brick corner chimneys.

The entrance is a round‑arched doorway on the right, with a panelled surround and cornice, leading to a recessed porch with internal steps. At ground level there are three cross‑windows with panelled surrounds and cornices. The first floor has four cross‑windows with moulded surrounds and pediments on brackets, the right‑hand window set slightly off‑centre above the doorway. The second floor forms a seven‑bay arcade of round‑arched windows, including a central niche with a shell canopy.

Architectural historian Clare Hartwell considers it the best building on Fountain Street: "Each floor is treated differently and there is a range of oeil-de-boeuf windows in stone frames in the attic".

== See also ==
- Grade II* listed buildings in Greater Manchester
- Listed buildings in Manchester-M2

== Bibliography ==
- Hartwell, Clare (2001). Manchester. Pevsner Architectural Guides. London: Penguin. ISBN 0-14-071131-7.
