= Dearnley Old Hall =

Listed house in Littleborough, Greater Manchester, England

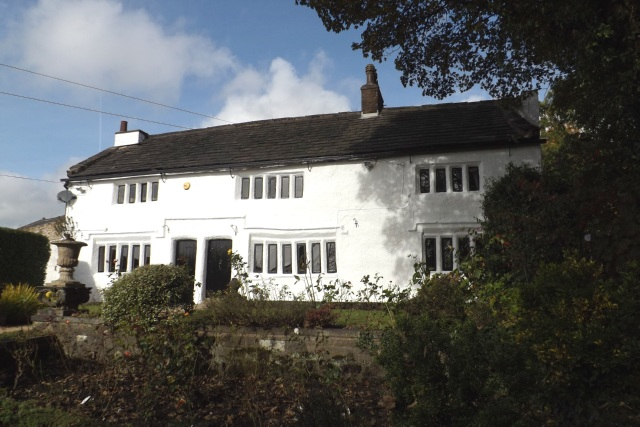
- The house in 2014

- Location within Greater Manchester

General information
- Location: New Road, Dearnley, Littleborough, Greater Manchester, England
- Coordinates: 53.6388°N 2.1192°W
- Year built: Early to mid-17th century (probable)

Listed Building – Grade II*
- Official name: Dearnley Old Hall
- Designated: 2 January 1967
- Reference no.: 1309691

Dearnley Old Hall is a Grade II* listed house on New Road in Dearnley, near Littleborough, within the Metropolitan Borough of Rochdale, Greater Manchester, England. Believed to date from the early to mid‑17th century, it is an example of local vernacular architecture and was historically associated with the rural hamlet of Dearnley, part of the ancient township of Wuerdle and Wardle in the historic county of Lancashire. The building remains a private residence.

== History ==
The hall probably dates from the early to mid-17th century, reflecting the vernacular architecture of the period. It was historically associated with the rural hamlet of Dearnley, which formed part of the ancient township of Wuerdle and Wardle in the historic county of Lancashire.

The hall first appears on historic maps in 1851, accompanied by several outbuildings which were subsequently demolished.

On 2 January 1967, Dearnley Old Hall was designated a Grade II* listed building.

The hall remains a private residence. It has been adapted over time, including 19th-century additions and modern refurbishments, but retains its historic character. The property sits within landscaped gardens and has been subject to archaeological evaluation during recent planning applications.

== Architecture ==
Dearnley Old Hall is constructed of rendered stone with a graduated stone slate roof. The building follows a three-unit, two-storey plan, with a 19th-century parallel range added to the rear.

The exterior features a projecting plinth and paired entrance doors set within chamfered surrounds beneath flat-arched lintels. The windows are notable for their double-chamfered mullions, arranged in groups of four, five, or six lights, with hood moulds that extend over the doorways. The gables are coped with kneelers, and the roofline includes brick-rebuilt ridge and gable chimney stacks.

=== Interior ===
Internally, the hall retains features such as a timber-framed crosswall at the lower end of the house-part, three Tudor-arched doorways, chamfered beams, and a boxed-in bressummer beam, indicative of medieval building traditions persisting into the 17th century.

== See also ==
- Grade II* listed buildings in Greater Manchester
- Listed buildings in Littleborough, Greater Manchester
