= Old Hall Fold =

Listed building in Ashton-under-Lyne, Greater Manchester, England

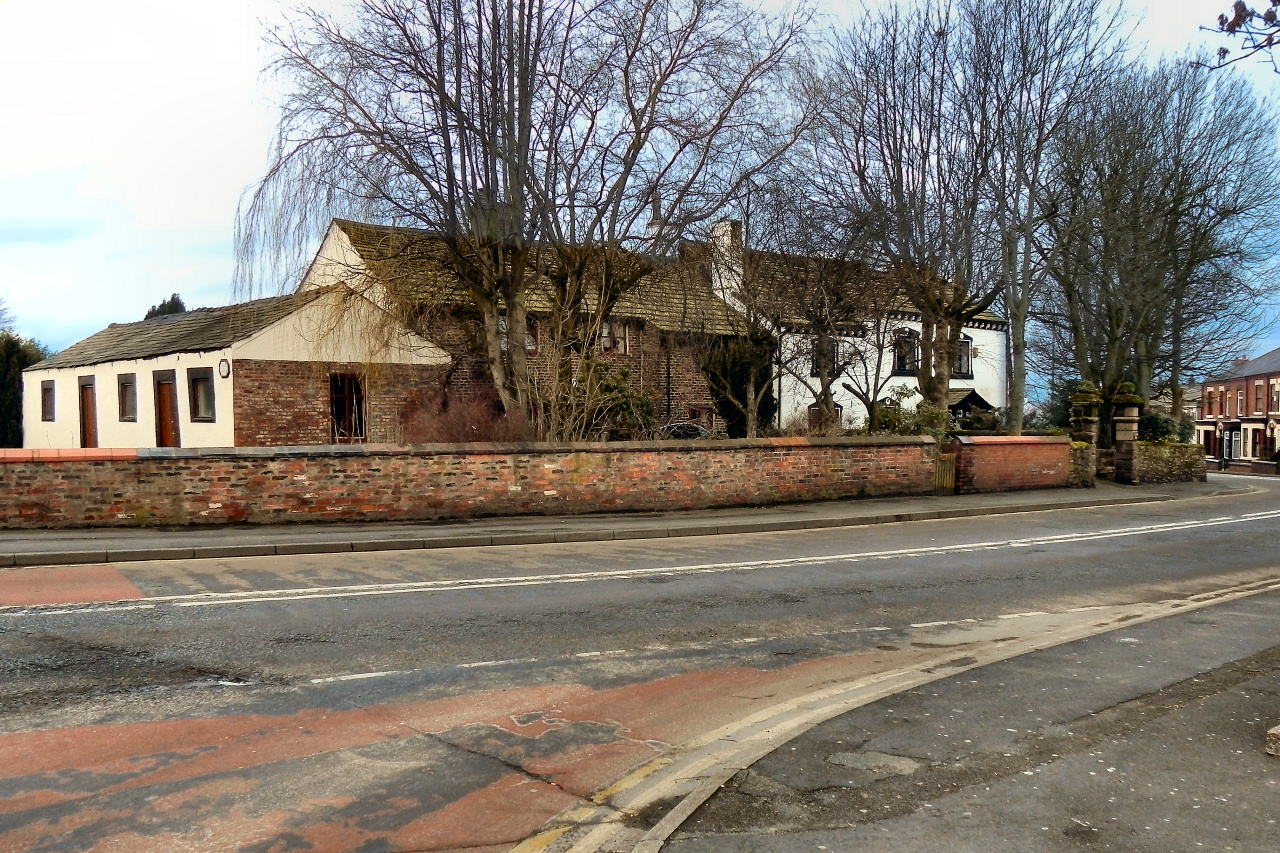
- Old Hall Fold in 2011

- Location within Greater Manchester

General information
- Location: Newmarket Road, Ashton-under-Lyne, Greater Manchester, England
- Coordinates: 53.50014°N 2.11168°W
- Years built: Medieval (cruck frame); 18th century (walls and roof)

Listed Building – Grade II*
- Official name: Old Hall Fold
- Designated: 12 January 1967
- Reference no.: 1067997

Old Hall Fold is a Grade II* listed historic house on Newmarket Road in Ashton-under-Lyne, a town within Tameside, Greater Manchester, England. It contains a medieval cruck-framed structure encased within 18th-century brick walls and roof, a form that survives in relatively few buildings in North West England.

== History ==
Old Hall Fold was originally part of a larger medieval hall, later divided into separate properties including Taunton Hall. Dendrochronological analysis suggests that some timbers date from the late 15th or early 16th century, with one cruck truss associated with timber felled around 1495–96. The building was encased in brick during the 18th century.

On 12 January 1967, Old Hall Fold was designated a Grade II* listed building for its architectural and historic significance. The building continues to serve as a privately owned dwelling and is not generally accessible to the public.

== Architecture ==
Old Hall Fold is a two-storey, three-bay house with an 18th-century brick casing and a graduated stone slate roof, enclosing a medieval cruck-framed structure. Built in English garden wall bond, it features a projecting right-hand cross-wing under an outshut roof. The front elevation has casement windows arranged in groups of four, two, and two lights, one beneath a wide cambered brick arch, with a doorway between the first and second bays and a passage leading to Taunton Hall. A brick ridge chimney stack crowns the building. The rear is rendered, with 20th-century casement windows, a small kitchen wing, and an altered shippon wing adjoining the left gable. The building's most notable feature is the survival of three substantial cruck trusses:

- Two large medieval trusses flank the principal room, marking the original open hall, now floored over. The right-hand truss has an arch-braced collar, and an inglenook fireplace backs onto it, with a massive bressummer beam supported by a carved heck post (now partly encased)
- The third truss, in the cross-wing, is likely 16th century, with a tie-beam, collar, wattle-and-daub infill, and blades visible from floor to ridge

Interior details include an ovolo-moulded ceiling beam. The survival of such an early cruck-framed structure within later brick casing is uncommon in North West England and shows how the building developed over time.

== See also ==
- Grade II* listed buildings in Greater Manchester
- Listed buildings in Ashton-under-Lyne
