= Windy Bank =

Listed house in Littleborough, Greater Manchester, England

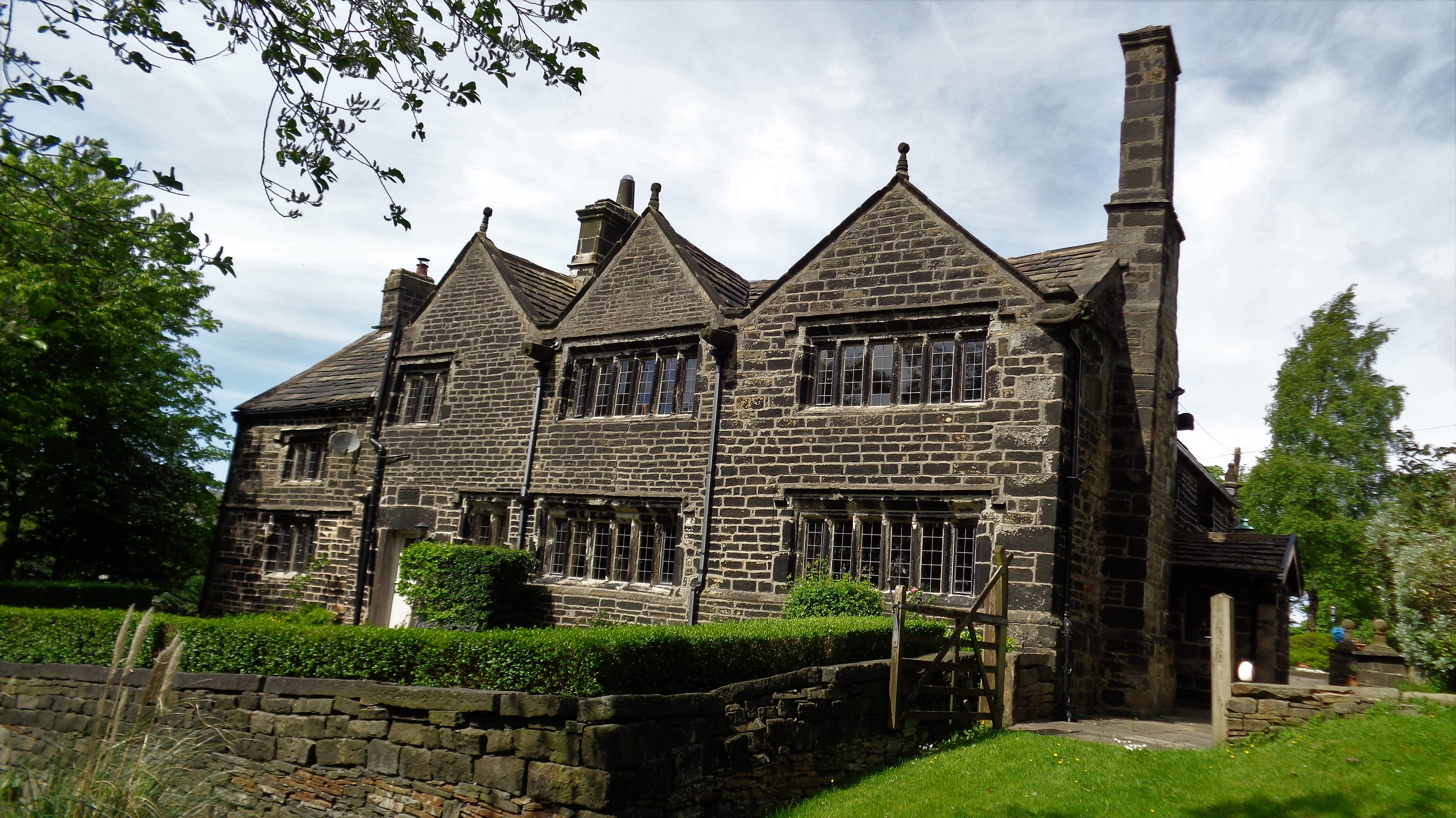
- The house in 2017

- Location within Greater Manchester

General information
- Location: Blackstone Edge Old Road, Littleborough, Greater Manchester, England
- Coordinates: 53.6464°N 2.0852°W
- Years built: 1611; 415 years ago (rear wing); 1635; 391 years ago (main range)
- Renovated: 19th and 20th century (altered)

Listed Building – Grade II*
- Official name: Windy Bank
- Designated: 2 January 1967
- Reference no.: 1068536

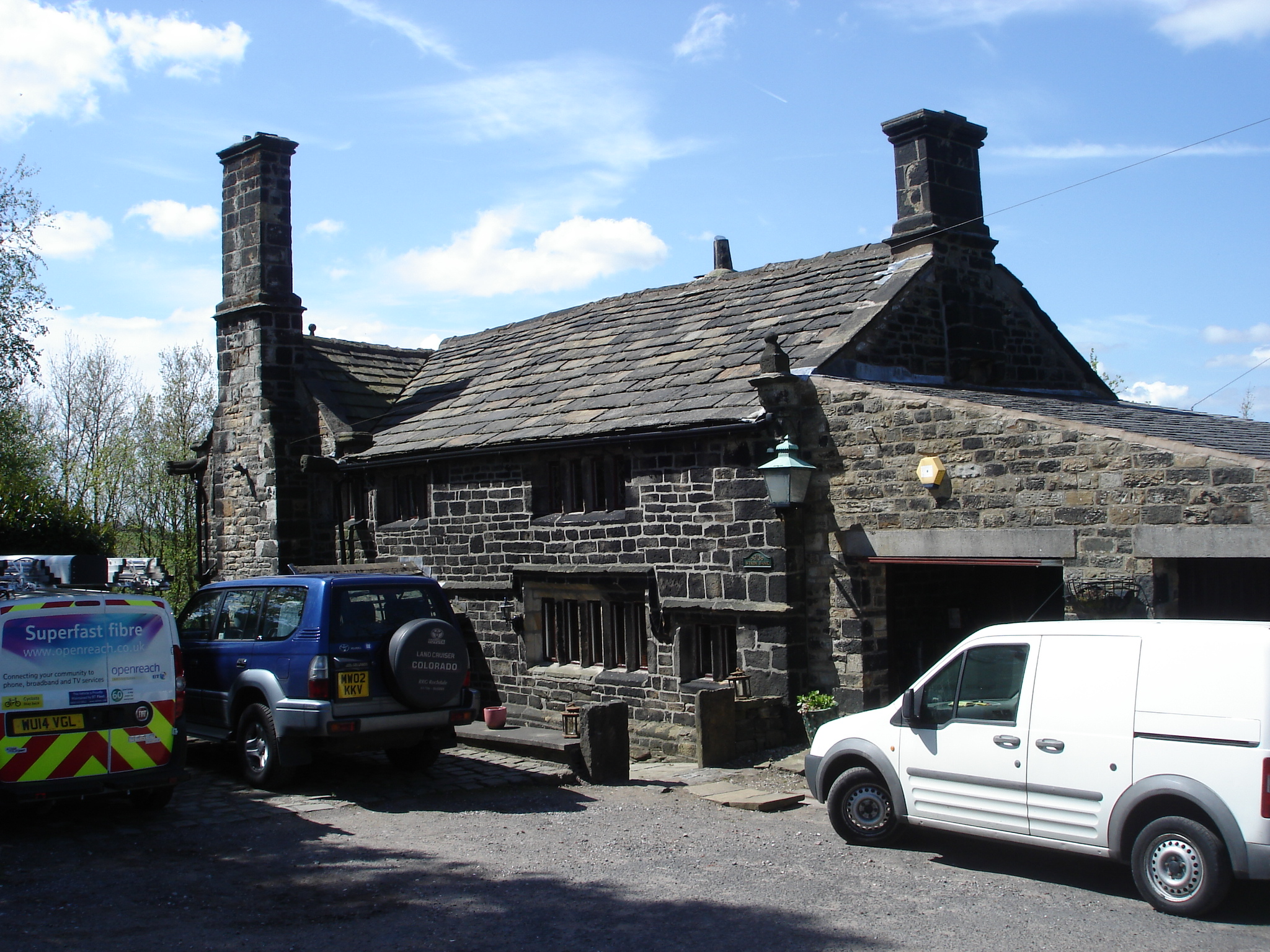
The rear wing in 2015

Windy Bank is a historic house on Blackstone Edge Old Road in Littleborough, a town within the Metropolitan Borough of Rochdale, Greater Manchester, England. It is designated as a Grade II* listed building, recognised for its architectural and historical significance.

== History ==
The house incorporates elements from different periods. Inscribed stones bear the initials "RL 1611" (Robert Lightowlers) and "IBI 1635" (John Butterworth), indicating phases of construction in the early 17th century. The rear wing, dated 1611, predates the main range and was originally a free-standing single-cell house before being linked to the main structure in the mid-17th century. The main range dates from 1635.

On 2 January 1967, it was designated a Grade II* listed building.

== Architecture ==
The building is constructed in hammer-dressed stone with a graduated stone-slate roof and retains elements of vernacular architecture. It originally incorporated a timber-framed structure, possibly dating from the early 16th century, although this was later removed. It follows a three-unit hearth-passage plan with a rear wing.

The house stands on a projecting plinth and features quoins, gargoyles, and a roof with coped gables and finials. Its plan is L-shaped, comprising a main range and a rear wing, the latter being the earliest section. The property is of two storeys; the main range consists of four bays and is surmounted by three gables. The windows are mullioned, some with hood moulds.

Hartwell, Hyde, and Pevsner's Buildings of England volume Lancashire: Manchester and the South-East describes Windy Bank as "an excellent house of tough character".

=== Interior ===
Internally, the hall contains arched and moulded fire surrounds, chamfered beams with stepped stops, and remnants of timber-framed roof trusses, including a king-post truss over the hall. The rear wing preserves an original boarded door, a bread oven within the gable stack, and roof trusses with diagonal struts. Later alterations include a 19th-century extension and 20th-century additions, such as a porch and garage.

== See also ==
- Grade II* listed buildings in Greater Manchester
- Listed buildings in Littleborough, Greater Manchester
