= Hathershaw Hall =

Listed house in Greater Manchester, England

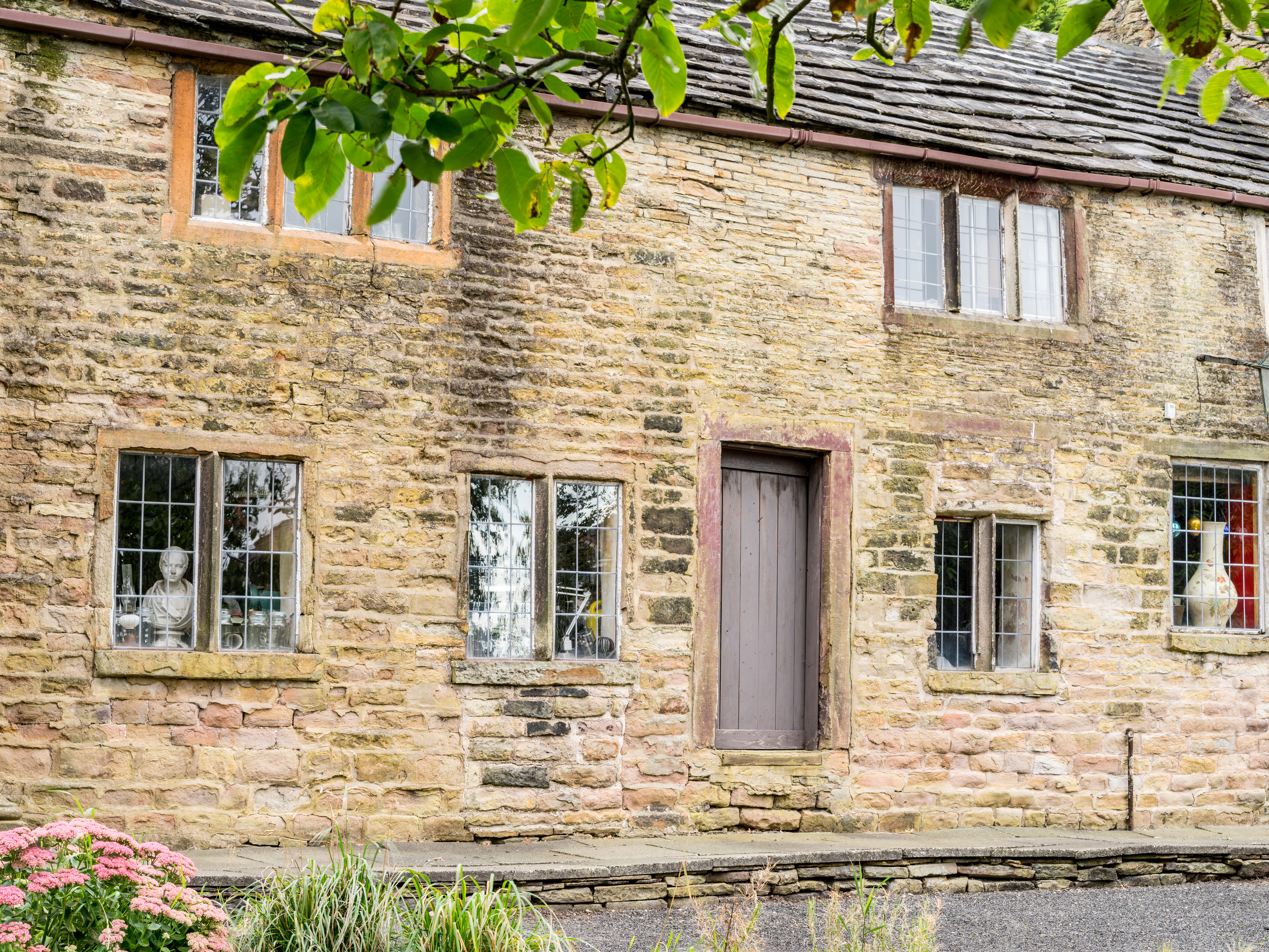
- The central section of the house, dating to c. 1590

- Location within Greater Manchester

General information
- Type: Manor house
- Location: 1–5 Hollins Road, Oldham, Greater Manchester, England
- Coordinates: 53.5252°N 2.1144°W
- Completed: c. 1694

Design and construction
- Designations

Listed Building – Grade II*
- Official name: Hathershaw Hall and Hathershaw Cottage
- Designated: 24 December 1970
- Reference no.: 1217873

Hathershaw Hall is a 16th–17th-century Grade II* listed house in Hathershaw, an urban area of Oldham, in Greater Manchester, England. The present structure is the single surviving range of a once considerably larger manor house. It is situated in what was the historic county of Lancashire.

== Description ==
Hathershaw Hall is a long, low, two-storey stone house standing back from Hollins Road; it faces south across an open space surrounded by a dry-stone wall. It comprises two distinct sections, the older is believed to date from the end of the 16th century, the more recently constructed eastern end the result of a rebuild a century later. The original section is of unremarkable vernacular architecture and difficult to date accurately. The site was occupied by a manor house in the 15th century, and part of the hall's structure may be from that building.

Its older portion is about 54 feet (16 m) in length with a slightly projecting wing at the west end. The east end appears to have been rebuilt in 1694 in a more regular and grander manner. It is taller with quoins at the angles and square-headed two-light windows, each with a centre mullion and transoms. The floor-line is marked by a string course, below which the walling is of large square blocks, and above it of narrower stones. This portion of the building is about 38 ft (12 m) long. The roofs of the two parts are at different levels, and covered with grey stone slates and stone ridge tiles. The gable ends are surmounted by ball-shaped, ornamental stone finials retained from the original structure.

== History ==
The present building is a fragment of a more extensive complex of buildings, most probably arranged around a central courtyard. Following abandonment by wealthy owners, much of the original hall was demolished and the remaining portion was divided into five cottages. When the hall was divided many traces of its original appearance were lost. It was in a decayed condition in 1826.

By repute the hall was the home of a 17th-century Royalist family who lost part of its possessions as a result of the English Civil War. For many generations it was the home of the Sandford, or Sandiford, family. The Sandfords owned the house in the 17th century and were presumably Royalists. In the 18th century, it was acquired by the Sidebottoms and Alexander Radclyffe Sidebottom was the owner in 1856. In the 1970s, the building was extensively renovated and many of the changes that were made when the hall was divided into cottages were reversed. It now comprises a large house with the westernmost portion a separate cottage; the whole building is privately owned. Hathershaw Hall is one of very few buildings in Oldham built before the Industrial Revolution.

== See also ==
- Grade II* listed buildings in Greater Manchester
- Listed buildings in Oldham
