= 25 St Ann Street =

Listed building in Manchester, England

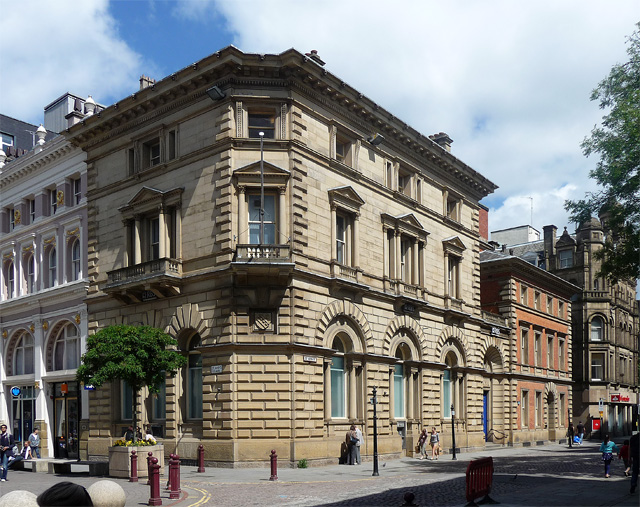
- 25 St Ann Street, bank and, to the right, attached manager's house

- Location within Greater Manchester

General information
- Architectural style: Italianate palazzo
- Location: Manchester, England
- Coordinates: 53.4819°N 2.2452°W
- Year built: 1848
- Client: Benjamin Heywood

Technical details
- Material: Sandstone

Design and construction
- Architect: John Edgar Gregan
- Designations

Listed Building – Grade II*
- Official name: 25, St Ann Street
- Designated: 25 February 1952
- Reference no.: 1270792

25 St Ann Street is a Victorian bank building with an attached manager's house in Manchester, England. Built in 1848 for Heywood's Bank and designed by John Edgar Gregan, it is regarded as one of the city's finest palazzo‑inspired commercial buildings. The premises later passed through several banking mergers, becoming part of the Royal Bank of Scotland in 1930, and were designated a Grade II* listed building in 1952. The branch remained in use until its closure in 2022.

== History ==
The building was constructed in 1848 for Benjamin Heywood of Heywood's Bank, according to its official listing, and was designed by John Edgar Gregan. It comprised new banking premises on the corner and an adjoining house for the manager. Heywood retired at the end of 1860, after which the business again traded as Heywood Brothers & Co. In April 1874 the bank was acquired by the Manchester & Salford Bank.

In 1890 the Manchester & Salford Bank became Williams Deacon's Bank, which in 1930 was taken over by the Royal Bank of Scotland.

On 25 February 1952, 25 Ann Street was designated a Grade II* listed building.

The building continued to operate as a Royal Bank of Scotland branch until its closure in October 2022. As of June 2026, no further information has been published about the status or future use of the building following its closure.

25 St Ann Street occupies the corner with St Ann's Square and faces the Grade I listed St Ann's Church.

== Architecture ==
The building is constructed in sandstone, "beautifully finished", with red brick and sandstone detailing, and has hipped slate roofs. It is arranged in three parts: the former bank on the corner of St Ann's Square, a central entrance bay that has been described as "an arrangement recalling the Palazzo Pandolfini in Florence", and what was originally the manager's house to the right. The design follows an Italianate palazzo style.

The bank section has three storeys, with three bays on the main front and an angled corner. The ground floor is heavily modelled, with large arched openings containing Venetian‑style windows, and the upper floors have sash windows, including wider three‑part windows in the centre. Many of the first‑floor windows have decorative surrounds and small balconies, and the top of the building is finished with a prominent cornice. The corner carries a carved shield, and the side elevation has similar windows, with an arcade at ground level.

The central entrance bay has a single‑storey porch with a round‑arched doorway marked "BANK", and a balustraded parapet above. The former manager's house to the right is also three storeys, with four bays, strong stonework at the corners, a round‑arched doorway in the third bay, and sash windows with moulded surrounds. The first‑floor windows have decorative panels beneath them, and the roofline is marked by a bold cornice.

The architectural historian Clare Hartwell describes the bank as "one of the finest palazzo-inspired buildings in the city".

== See also ==
- Grade II* listed buildings in Greater Manchester
- Listed buildings in Manchester-M2

== Bibliography ==
- Hartwell, Clare (2002). Manchester. Pevsner Architectural Guides. London: Yale University Press. ISBN 0-300-09666-6.
