= Hope Chapel and Parson's House =

Listed buildings in Greater Manchester, England

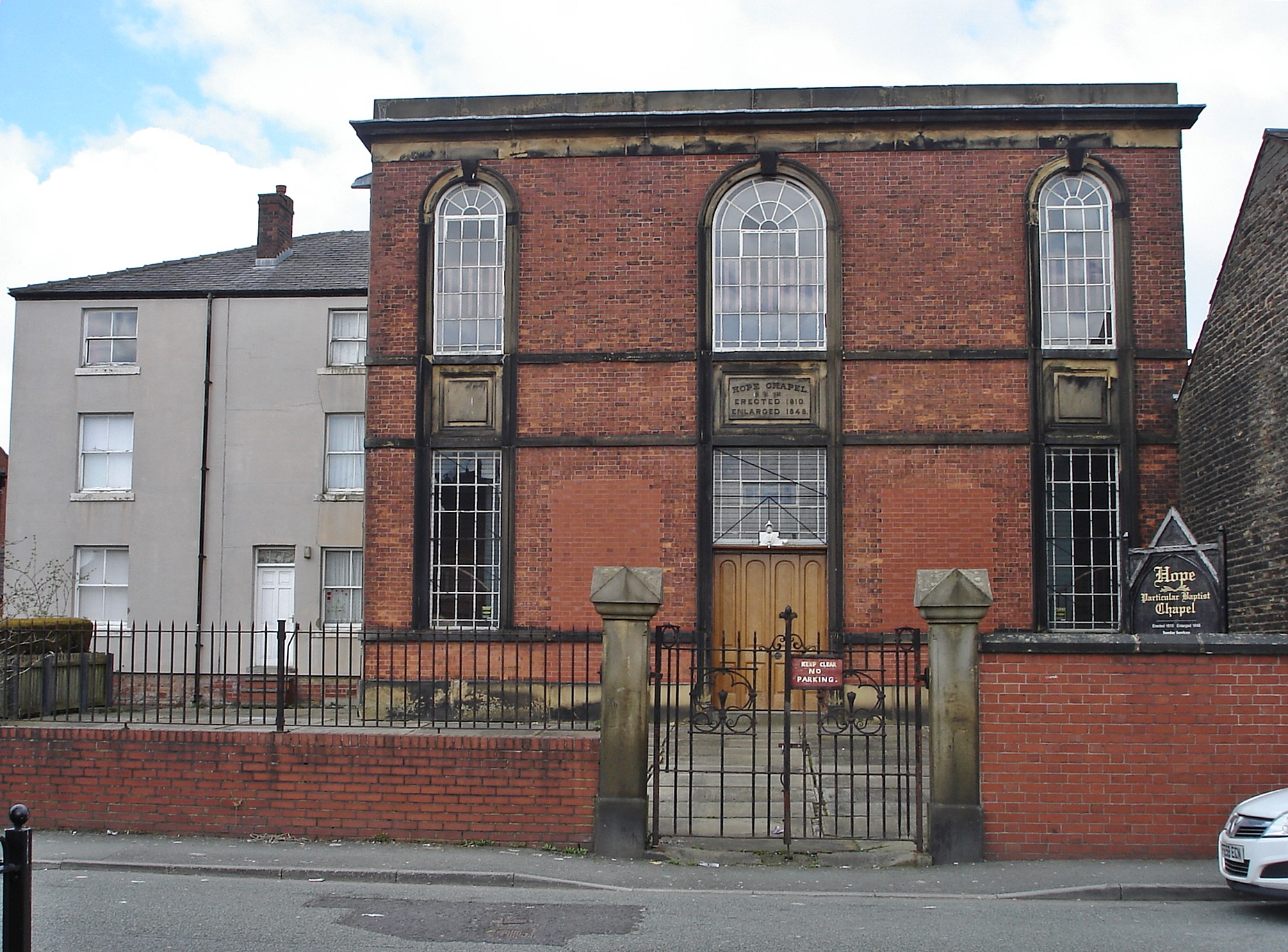
- Hope Chapel (right) and Parson's House (left) in 2015

- Location within Greater Manchester

General information
- Location: Hope Street and Wilson Street, Rochdale, Greater Manchester, England
- Coordinates: 53.6217°N 2.1580°W
- Year built: 1810; 216 years ago
- Opened: 1811; 215 years ago
- Renovated: 1848 and 1887 (extended); 2020s (restored)

Website
- rochdalehopechapel.org.uk

Listed Building – Grade II*
- Official name: Hope Chapel and Parsons House; Parson's House
- Designated: 12 February 1985
- Reference no.: 1057694

Hope Chapel and Parson's House are adjoining Grade II* listed buildings on Hope Street and Wilson Street in central Rochdale, Greater Manchester, England. Built in 1810 and extended in 1848 and 1887, the complex is an example of a Nonconformist chapel for Baptists and its associated minister's residence from the Georgian era. The buildings illustrate aspects of religious, social, and architectural development in early 19th‑century Rochdale during the Industrial Revolution. Today, they serve as a heritage and community centre.

== History ==
The origins of Hope Chapel trace back to 1809 when a group of Strict and Particular Baptists separated from Town Meadows Chapel after attending sermons by William Gadsby, a prominent minister in Manchester. On 24 May 1809, 15 individuals, including John Kershaw—later minister for over 50 years—formed a new congregation. Initially meeting in a farmhouse and then a schoolroom on Drake Street, the growing congregation decided to build its own chapel and minister's house. The foundation stone was laid in 1810, and the chapel opened in Whit Week 1811, with Gadsby preaching at the inaugural service. The original building was modest, later enlarged in 1848 to accommodate increasing attendance and to add a schoolroom in 1855.

Hope Chapel became a place of worship for the Gospel Standard Strict Baptist denomination, with ministers such as John Warburton and Kershaw associated with its development. The chapel played a role in Rochdale's Nonconformist tradition, providing religious instruction during a period of rapid industrialisation.

On 12 February 1985, Hope Chapel and Parson's House were designated Grade II* listed buildings.

In 2019 the chapel closed its doors after more than 200 years of continuous worship. Following extensive restoration, the building reopened in 2024 as the Hope Chapel Heritage Centre. The reopening ceremony, held on 20 December 2024, attracted around 200 attendees. The project was intended to preserve the chapel's architectural and cultural heritage and to provide space for heritage education and community events.

== Architecture ==
Hope Chapel is constructed of brick with stone dressings and a slate roof. The main meeting hall features a four-sided gallery supported by cast-iron columns with foliated capitals. Original fittings survive, including box pews curving around three sides of the auditorium, a central pulpit, and a communion rail with cast-iron balusters. The gallery fronts are panelled and stencilled, and the pulpit and rail date from the 1848 enlargement. Despite a seating capacity of over 700, the interior is noted for its sense of intimacy. An organ is housed on the fourth side of the gallery, with a vestry beneath. A memorial to John Kershaw, the chapel's founding minister, is located on the west wall.

The adjoining Parson's House, attached at the Wilson Street end, was originally built around 1810 and extended in 1887. The three-storey residence incorporates Georgian stylistic elements, including stone sills and lintels, a hipped roof, and a façade with giant arched windows framed by moulded architraves and keystones. The front elevation features a stone cornice and parapet, while the side elevation displays a double gable marking the 1810 and 1848 phases. Both buildings share a burial ground at the front, where ledger stones lie flat. Interior fittings remain in excellent condition, preserving the character of the mid-19th-century enlargement.

== See also ==
- Grade II* listed buildings in Greater Manchester
- Listed buildings in Rochdale
