= Manchester Law Library =

Listed building in Manchester, England

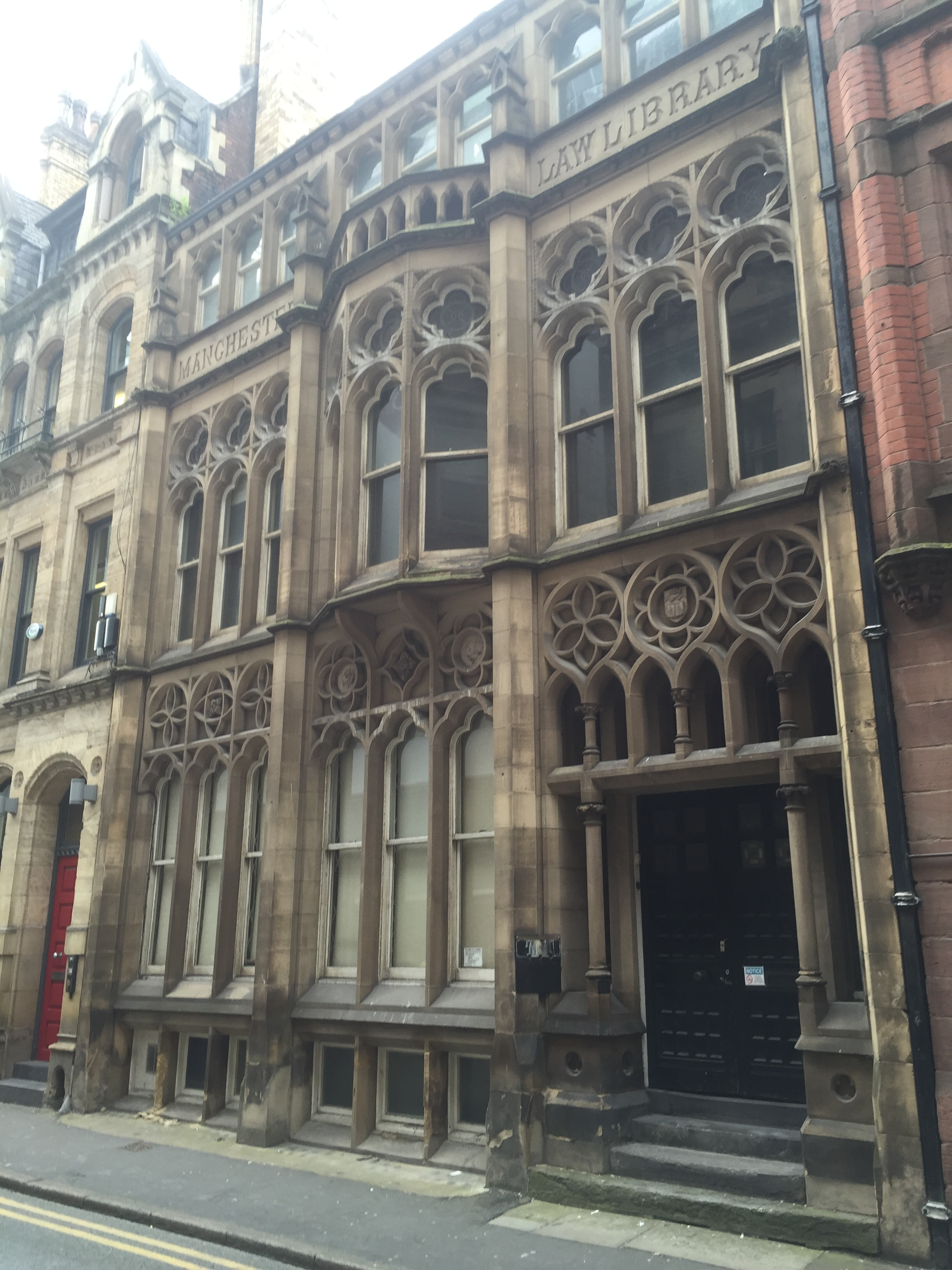
- The oldest provincial law library in England

- Location within Greater Manchester

General information
- Status: Converted to commercial and office use
- Type: Law library (former)
- Architectural style: Venetian Gothic
- Location: Kennedy Street, Manchester, England
- Coordinates: 53.48°N 2.2438°W
- Year built: 1884–85

Design and construction
- Architect: Thomas Hartas
- Main contractor: William Holt
- Designations

Listed Building – Grade II*
- Official name: Manchester Law Library
- Designated: 3 October 1974
- Reference no.: 1219102

The former Manchester Law Library is a Grade II* listed building in the Venetian Gothic style on Kennedy Street in Manchester, England. Built in 1884–85 as the home of the Manchester Law Society's library and meeting rooms, it was designed by Thomas Hartas, a little‑known architect for whom it appears to have been the only major commission. The building housed what became the oldest provincial law library in England until the society relocated to Booth Street in 2015, after which the premises were sold and adapted for private commercial and office use.

== History ==
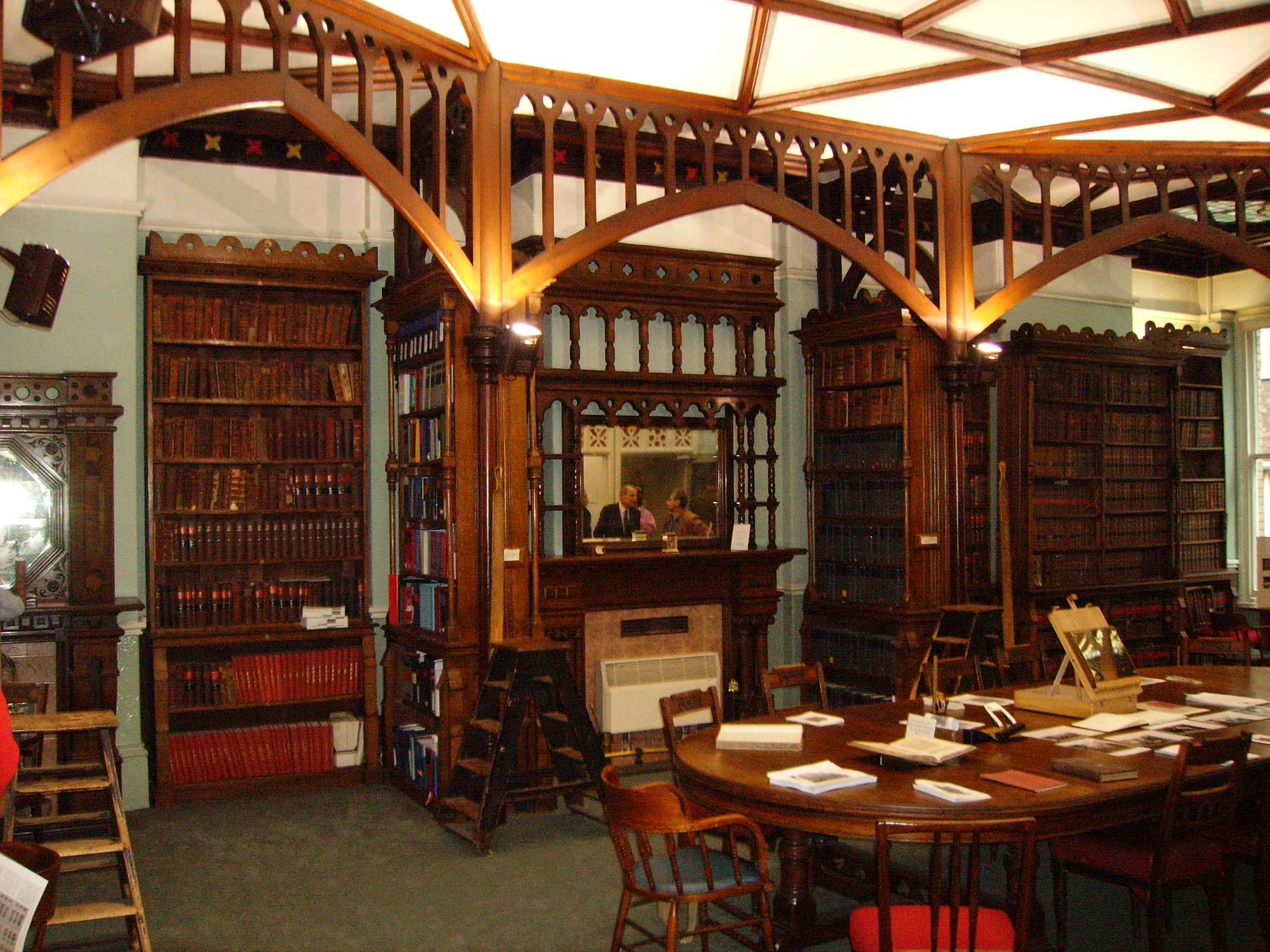
Reading room

Designed by Thomas Hartas, the library was built by William Holt between 1884 and 1885 to provide a meeting place, and reading room, for the Manchester Law Society. Hartas (1854–1886) is a little-known, and sparsely-documented, architect. He was born in Mansfield, Nottinghamshire and trained as a surveyor. He had moved to Manchester by 1876, and died ten years later in Barmouth, North Wales. With the exception of the law library, his output appears confined to villas in Nottinghamshire and the North West, mainly undertaken for friends or relations. He has no entry in the RIBA Directory of British Architects 1834–1914 an exhaustive survey of practising architects of the Victorian era.

On 3 October 1974, Manchester Law Library was designated a Grade II* listed building.

After 130 years of occupation by the society, the building was put up for sale in 2015. The law library relocated to new premises on Booth Street, where it remains a private library open only to subscribing members of the legal profession. The former library on Kennedy Street has since been repurposed for private occupiers, including a design and architectural showroom, and office space.

== Architecture ==
The building is faced in sandstone with a slate roof and has a simple rectangular layout. It is designed in a Venetian Gothic style and has two main storeys with a basement and attic. The three‑bay front is "divided into three again with richly traceried and strongly moulded frames to the openings", and a parapet carrying the words "MANCHESTER" and "LAW LIBRARY". The entrance is set back to the right behind a screen of open tracery. Both floors have large three‑light sash windows with trefoil heads, with the central first‑floor window set in an oriel with an arcaded parapet. The attic has small arched windows, and the front is finished with a dentilled cornice.

=== Interior ===
Internally, a lending library is located on the ground floor, "now with twentieth century furnishings. On the first floor, a reading room "with most of the (slightly rearranged) attractive, original fittings". These include the central oak table, three fireplaces, and tall bookcases, some set at right angles to the walls to maximise the available storage space. The "stained glass is a noteworthy feature (including) three roundels containing the images of bewigged judges". Offices are above this. "The building is noteworthy by virtue of having been built for the purposes of a law library and, London and the old universities aside, it is believed to have performed this function for a period longer than any other provincial law library".

== See also ==
- Grade II* listed buildings in Greater Manchester
- Listed buildings in Manchester-M2

== Bibliography ==
- Brodie, Antonia; Felsted, Alison; Franklin, Jonathan (2001). Directory of British Architects 1834–1914: A–K. British Architectural Library. ISBN 9780826455130.
- Hartwell, Clare (2001). Manchester. New Haven, US and London: Yale University Press. ISBN 978-0-300-02390-9.
- Higginson, D. J. (2007). The Manchester Law Library: a Short History 1820–1885. Privately printed.
- Pevsner, Nikolaus; Hartwell, Clare; Hyde, Matthew (2004). Lancashire: Manchester and the South East. The Buildings of England. New Haven, US, and London: Yale University Press.
