= 15 Firwood Fold =

Listed house in Greater Manchester, England

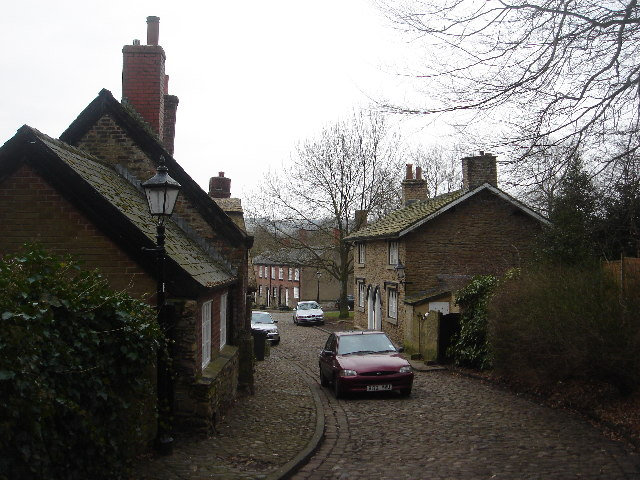
- Firwood Fold cottages in Bolton

- Location within Greater Manchester

General information
- Location: Bolton, Greater Manchester, England
- Coordinates: 53°35′44″N 2°24′19″W
- Completed: 16th century (probably)
- Renovated: 19th century (extensively remodelled)

Technical details
- Floor count: 2

Design and construction
- Designations

Listed Building – Grade II*
- Official name: 15, Firwood Fold
- Designated: 26 April 1974
- Reference no.: 1388040

15 Firwood Fold is a 16th-century house in Bolton, Greater Manchester, England. It is a Grade II* listed building and according to local tradition is the oldest inhabited house in Bolton. It stands separate from the other houses on Firwood Fold.

The house was originally built in a medieval style using the cruck construction technique, whereby A-shaped oak trusses on stone bases were covered in wattle and daub and thatch. It was later renovated and clad in stone. One of the trusses can be clearly seen in the gable end.

In 1969 the hamlet of Firwood Fold was designated Bolton's first conservation area, ensuring protection of its historic character. The unified appearance of the hamlet—simple style, local stone, and modest scale—has been preserved despite centuries of change.

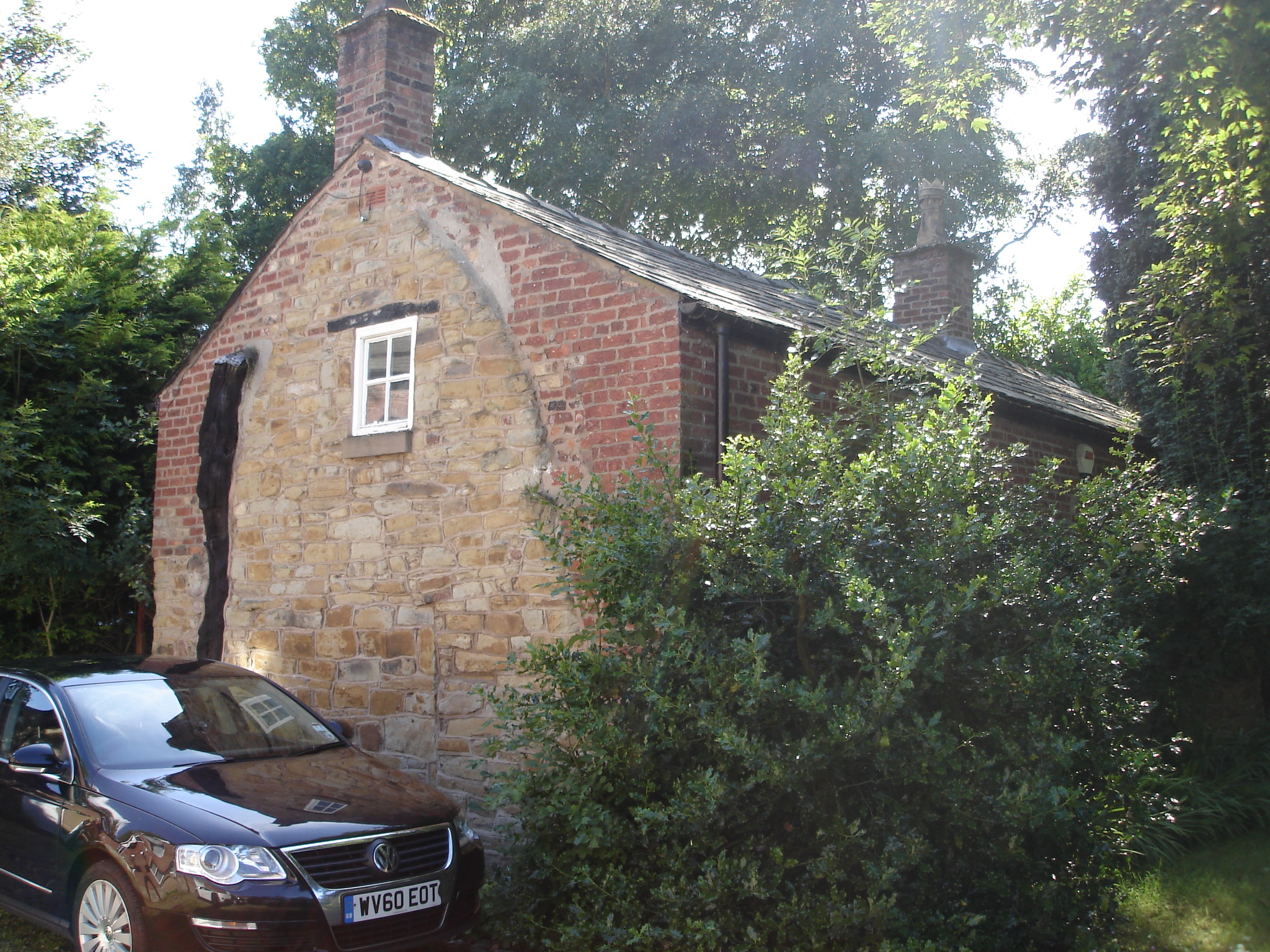
15 Firwood Fold from the rear

== See also ==
- 10 Firwood Fold, a Grade I-listed building in the hamlet
- Grade II* listed buildings in Greater Manchester
- Listed buildings in Bolton
