= Grade II* listed buildings in Greater Manchester =

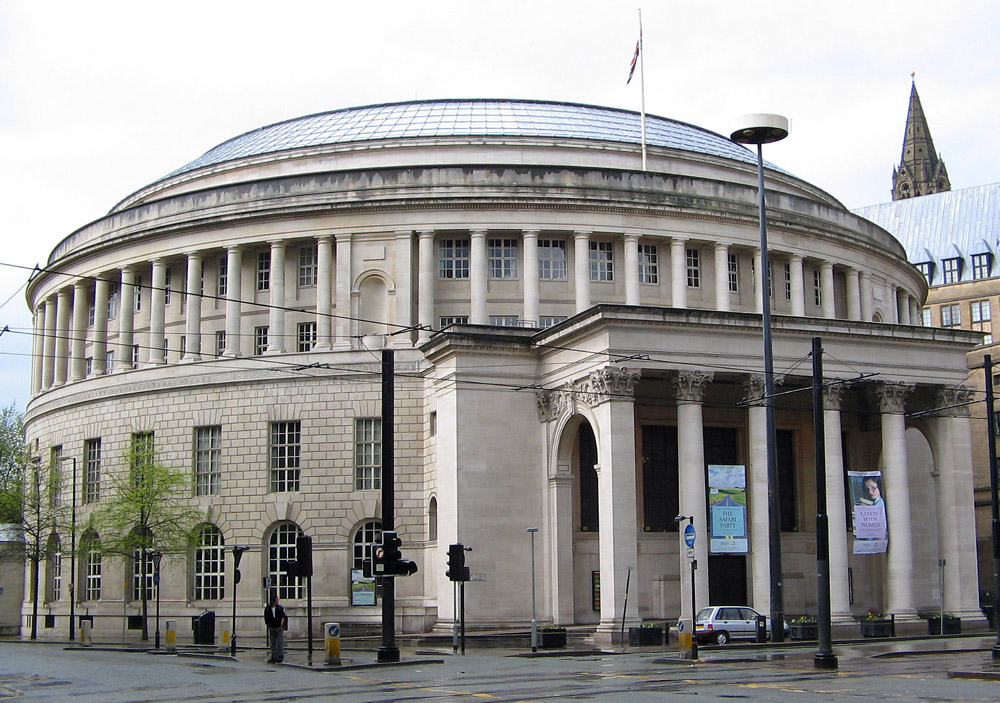
Manchester Central Library

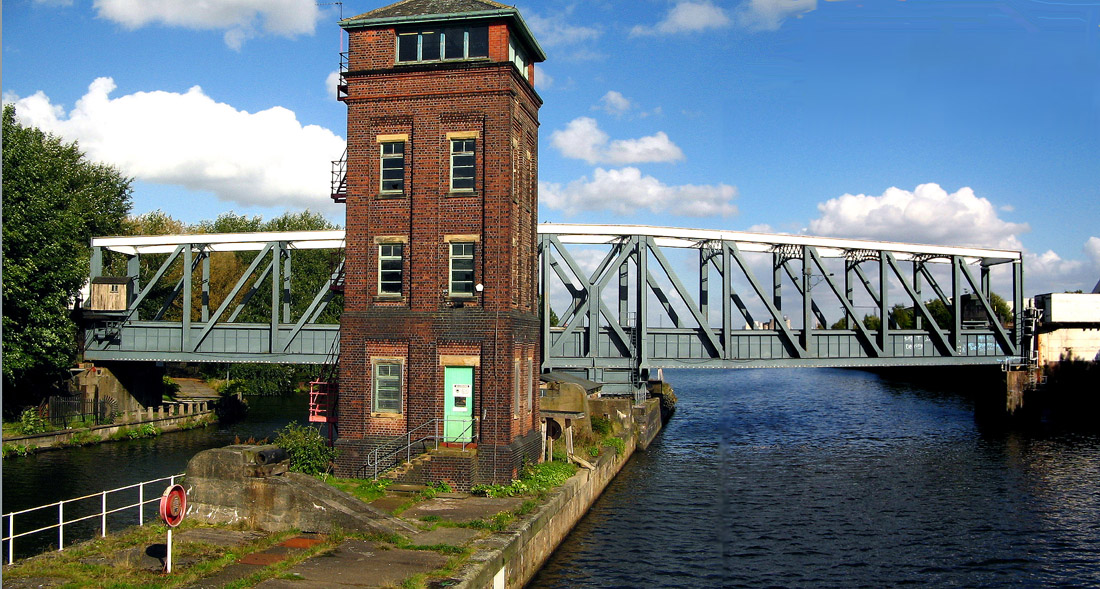
Barton Swing Aqueduct in the closed position

There are 242 Grade II* listed buildings in Greater Manchester, England. In the United Kingdom, the term listed building refers to a building or other structure officially designated as being of special architectural or historic interest. Grade II* structures are those considered to be "particularly important buildings of more than special interest". In England, the authority for listing under the Planning (Listed Buildings and Conservation Areas) Act 1990 rests with the Secretary of State for Culture, Media and Sport, advised by Historic England, a non-departmental public body sponsored by the Department for Culture, Media and Sport.

The metropolitan county of Greater Manchester comprises 10 metropolitan boroughs: Bolton, Bury, Manchester, Oldham, Rochdale, Salford, Stockport, Tameside, Trafford, and Wigan. Manchester, the world's first industrialised city, contains 81 of the county's 242 Grade II* listed buildings, the highest number of any borough; Bury has the fewest, with 10. The River Irwell forms part of the boundary between Salford and Trafford, and one structure—the Barton Swing Aqueduct—lies on this boundary and is therefore included in both borough lists. This duplication is reflected in the official total of 242.

Most of Greater Manchester's listed buildings date from the Victorian and Edwardian periods. According to a publication by the Association for Industrial Archaeology, Greater Manchester is "one of the classic areas of industrial and urban growth in Britain, the result of a combination of forces that came together in the 18th and 19th centuries: a phenomenal rise in population, the appearance of the specialist industrial town, a transport revolution, and weak local lordship". Much of the region, historically a part of Lancashire, was at the forefront of textile manufacturing from the early 19th until the early 20th century, and the county includes several former mill towns. Greater Manchester has a wealth of industrial heritage, represented by architecture found throughout the county, but many of its Grade II* listed buildings have a municipal, ecclesiastic or other cultural significance.

Three of the 242 buildings date from the 13th century, although it is uncertain which is the oldest. Brandlesholme Old Hall in Bury was originally an open-hall cruck-framed house, dating from the 13th century, although it was altered and extended in the 16th century and completely remodelled in 1849. The Church of St Chad in Rochdale retains a 13th-century tower, with an extension added in 1870. Mab's Cross in Wigan, the stump of a boundary cross, is probably 13th century in origin. The newest Grade II* listed building in Greater Manchester is Wythenshawe Bus Depot, built in 1942. Owing to the heavy impact of the Industrial Revolution on Greater Manchester, just under half of its Grade II* listed buildings—119 structures, or 49%—were completed in the 19th century.

== Bolton ==
Grade II* listed buildings in Bolton
| Name | Location | Type | Architect | Completed (Note: The date given is the date used by Historic England as significant for the initial building or that of an important part in the structure's description.) | Date designated | Grid ref. (Note: The grid reference is based on the British national grid reference system, sometimes known as OSGB36, used by the Ordnance Survey.) Geo-coordinates | Entry number (Note: The "List Entry Number" is a unique number assigned to each listed building and scheduled monument by Historic England.) | Image | Ref. |
|---|---|---|---|---|---|---|---|---|---|
| Church of St Mary | Junction Road, Deane | Church | | 15th century, 1884–85 (rebuilt) | 23 April 1952 | SD6933708126; 53°34′08″N 2°27′52″W | 1388085 | Church of St Mary More images | |
| Random Cottage | Greenmount Lane, Heaton | Farmhouse | | 16th century | 26 April 1974 | SD6900909700; 53°34′59″N 2°28′10″W | 1388049 | Upload Photo | |
| 3 and 4 Walsh Fold | Bradshaw, Bolton | Farmhouse | | Late 17th century | 27 January 1967 | SD7391014589; 53°37′38″N 2°23′45″W | 1067308 | 3 and 4 Walsh Fold More images | |
| Ringley Old Bridge | Ringley Road, Ringley | Bridge | | 1677 | 19 August 1986 | SD7632605314; 53°32′38″N 2°21′31″W | 1356800 | Ringley Old Bridge More images | |
| Lea Gate Farmhouse | Lea Gate, Bradshaw | Farmhouse | | c. 1700 | 27 January 1967 | SD7381912119; 53°36′18″N 2°23′50″W | 1162725 | Lea Gate Farmhouse More images | |
| Church of St George | Bath Street, Bolton | Church | | 1796 | 26 April 1974 | SD7160009600; 53°34′56″N 2°25′50″W | 1388252 | Church of St George More images | |
| Gatehouse to Lostock Hall (demolished) with cottage range to rear | Hall Lane, Lostock | House | | 1810 | 23 April 1952 | SD6564209090; 53°34′38″N 2°31′13″W | 1388054 | Gatehouse to Lostock Hall (demolished) with cottage range to rear More images | |
| Church of St Stephen and All Martyrs | Radcliffe Road, Darcy Lever | Church | Edmund Sharpe | 1842–1845 | 26 April 1974 | SD7328008477; 53°34′20″N 2°24′18″W | 1388051 | Church of St Stephen and All Martyrs More images | |
| 15 Firwood Fold | Crompton, Bolton | House | | 16th century, 19th century (remodelled) | 26 April 1974 | SD7323111064; 53°35′44″N 2°24′21″W | 1388040 | 15 Firwood Fold More images | |
| Town Hall | Victoria Square, Bolton | Town hall | William Hill, George Woodhouse (assisted) | 1866–1873 | 26 April 1974 | SD7157009154; 53°34′42″N 2°25′51″W | 1388295 | Town Hall More images | |
| Parish Church of St Peter | Churchgate, Bolton | Church | E. G. Paley | 1867–1871 | 26 April 1974 | SD7205209288; 53°34′46″N 2°25′25″W | 1387979 | Parish Church of St Peter More images | |
| Church of St Thomas the Apostle | Eskrick Street, Halliwell | Church | Paley and Austin | 1875 | 26 April 1974 | SD7080010758; 53°35′33″N 2°26′33″W | 1388034 | Church of St Thomas the Apostle More images | |
| Church of St James | Daisy Hill, Westhoughton | Church | Paley and Austin | 1879–1881 | 19 August 1986 | SD6577104347; 53°32′05″N 2°31′04″W | 1067273 | Church of St James More images | |
| Church of All Souls | Astley Street, Bolton | Church | Paley and Austin | 1880 | 26 April 1974 | SD7137910887; 53°35′38″N 2°26′02″W | 1387878 | Church of All Souls More images | |
| Swan Lane Mills Numbers 1 and 2 | Higher Swan Lane, Daubhill | Textile mill | Stott and Sons | 1903 | 26 April 1974 | SD7074007548; 53°33′49″N 2°26′36″W | 1388070 | Swan Lane Mills Numbers 1 and 2 More images | |
| Swan Lane Mill Number 3 | Higher Swan Lane, Daubhill | Textile mill | Stott and Sons | 1914 | 26 April 1974 | SD7080307625; 53°33′52″N 2°26′32″W | 1388071 | Swan Lane Mill Number 3 More images | |
| Bolton Cenotaph | Victoria Square, Bolton | War memorial | A. J. Hope | 1928 | 30 April 1999 | SD7165309171; 53°34′42″N 2°25′47″W | 1388289 | Bolton Cenotaph More images | |

== Bury ==
Grade II* listed buildings in Bury
| Name | Location | Type | Architect | Completed | Date designated | Grid ref. Geo-coordinates | Entry number | Image | Ref. |
|---|---|---|---|---|---|---|---|---|---|
| Brandlesholme Old Hall | Brandlesholme Road, Bury | House | | 13th century | 29 January 1985 | SD7877213210; 53°36′54″N 2°19′20″W | 1067287 | Upload Photo | |
| Dearden Fold Farmhouse | Bury Old Road, Radcliffe | Farmhouse | | 16th century | 29 January 1985 | SD7582010176; 53°35′15″N 2°22′00″W | 1356793 | Dearden Fold Farmhouse | |
| Presbyterian Chapel | Knowsley Road, Ainsworth | Chapel | | 16th century | 29 July 1966 | SD7629510322; 53°35′20″N 2°21′34″W | 1163487 | Presbyterian Chapel More images | |
| Hey House | Holcombe Old Road, Ramsbottom | House | | c. 1616 | 9 August 1966 | SD7768815915; 53°38′21″N 2°20′20″W | 1067269 | Hey House | |
| Lower Chesham | Bell Lane, Bury | House | | 1713 | 26 May 1976 | SD8151111357; 53°35′54″N 2°16′51″W | 1067281 | Upload Photo | |
| Monument to John Brooks to west of Church of St Mary | Church Lane, Prestwich | Commemorative monument | John Thomas | c. 1851 | 29 January 1985 | SD8104303665; 53°31′45″N 2°17′15″W | 1067254 | Monument to John Brooks to west of Church of St Mary More images | |
| Christ Church | High Street, Walshaw | Church | Lawrence Booth | 1888 | 29 January 1985 | SD7766611564; 53°36′01″N 2°20′20″W | 1163417 | Christ Church More images | |
| Radcliffe Cenotaph | Blackburn Street, Radcliffe | Cenotaph | Sydney March | 1922 | 10 March 1992 | SD7837107362; 53°33′45″N 2°19′41″W | 1067192 | Radcliffe Cenotaph More images | |
| War Memorial to the Lancashire Fusiliers, Gallipoli Gardens | Gallipoli Gardens, Bury | War memorial | Edwin Lutyens | 1922 | 2 September 1992 | SD8032510670; 53°35′32″N 2°17′55″W | 1250814 | War Memorial to the Lancashire Fusiliers, Gallipoli Gardens More images | |
| Bury War Memorial | The Rock, Bury | War memorial | Reginald Blomfield | 1924 | 7 April 2017 | SD8040810841; 53°35′38″N 2°17′51″W | 1444845 | Bury War Memorial More images | |

== Manchester ==
Grade II* listed buildings in Manchester
| Name | Location | Type | Architect | Completed | Date designated | Grid ref. Geo-coordinates | Entry number | Image | Ref. |
|---|---|---|---|---|---|---|---|---|---|
| Clayton Hall | Ashton New Road, Clayton | House | | 15th century | 25 February 1952 | SJ8814198568; 53°29′01″N 2°10′49″W | 1197795 | Clayton Hall More images | |
| Church of St Wilfrid | Ford Lane, Northenden | Church | J. S. Crowther (1873–1876) | 15th century, 1873–1876 (rebuilt) | 25 February 1952 | SJ8324190062; 53°24′26″N 2°15′13″W | 1200834 | Church of St Wilfrid More images | |
| Wythenshawe Hall | Wythenshawe Park, Wythenshawe | House | | Early 16th century | 25 February 1952 | SJ8160489825; 53°24′18″N 2°16′41″W | 1255034 | Wythenshawe Hall More images | |
| Slade Hall | Slade Lane, Longsight | House | | 1585 | 25 February 1952 | SJ8701794889; 53°27′02″N 2°11′49″W | 1254632 | Slade Hall | |
| Hough End Hall | Nell Lane, Chorlton-cum-Hardy | House | | 1596 | 25 February 1952 | SJ8249293244; 53°26′08″N 2°15′54″W | 1283002 | Hough End Hall More images | |
| Church of St James | Stenner Lane, Didsbury | Church | | Early 17th century (rebuilt) | 25 February 1952 | SJ8469190378; 53°24′36″N 2°13′54″W | 1270663 | Church of St James More images | |
| Cobden House, 19 Quay Street | Quay Street, Manchester | House | | Mid-18th century | 3 October 1974 | SJ8336498014; 53°28′43″N 2°15′08″W | 1247447 | Cobden House, 19 Quay Street More images | |
| Platt Hall | Platt Fields Park, Fallowfield | House | Thomas Lightoler | c. 1764 | 25 March 1952 | SJ8533594879; 53°27′02″N 2°13′20″W | 1246947 | Platt Hall More images | |
| Temple to north east of Heaton Hall | Heaton Park, Crumpsall | Garden temple | James Wyatt | Late 18th century | 25 February 1952 | SD8349304560; 53°32′15″N 2°15′02″W | 1200813 | Temple to north east of Heaton Hall More images | |
| Parrs Wood House | Wilmslow Road, Parrs Wood | House | | Late 18th century | 25 February 1952 | SJ8564890302; 53°24′34″N 2°13′03″W | 1254971 | Parrs Wood House More images | |
| Administration building at Didsbury Campus, Manchester Metropolitan University (original portion only) | Wilmslow Road, Didsbury | House | Richard Lane (probable; 1842 alterations) | c. 1790, 1842 (altered) | 25 February 1952 | SJ8479590600; 53°24′43″N 2°13′49″W | 1254970 | Administration building at Didsbury Campus, Manchester Metropolitan University (original portion only) More images | |
| Decker Mill and Old Mill | Redhill Street, Ancoats | Textile mill | | 1798 (Old Mill), 1802 (Decker Mill) | 20 June 1988 | SJ8507298584; 53°29′02″N 2°13′35″W | 1247473 | Decker Mill and Old Mill More images | |
| Store Street Aqueduct | Store Street, Ancoats | Aqueduct | Benjamin Outram | 1799 | 6 June 1994 | SJ8500998116; 53°28′46″N 2°13′38″W | 1270666 | Store Street Aqueduct More images | |
| New Mill | Jersey Street, Ancoats | Textile mill | | 1804 | 20 June 1988 | SJ8503298642; 53°29′03″N 2°13′37″W | 1200821 | New Mill | |
| Dale Warehouse | Dale Street, Manchester | Warehouse | William Crosley | 1806 | 10 November 1972 | SJ8469298190; 53°28′49″N 2°13′56″W | 1200845 | Dale Warehouse More images | |
| The Portico Library and the Bank public house | Mosley Street, Manchester | Library | Thomas Harrison | 1806 | 25 February 1952 | SJ8414398139; 53°28′47″N 2°14′25″W | 1197930 | The Portico Library and the Bank public house More images | |
| Smithy Lodge to east of Heaton Hall | Heaton Park, Crumpsall | House | Lewis Wyatt | 1806 | 25 February 1952 | SD8400504491; 53°32′13″N 2°14′34″W | 1282994 | Smithy Lodge to east of Heaton Hall More images | |
| Grand Lodge to south-south-west of Heaton Hall with screen walls and wall attached to west | Heaton Park, Crumpsall | House | Lewis Wyatt | c. 1807 | 25 February 1952 | SD8268003209; 53°31′31″N 2°15′46″W | 1200812 | Grand Lodge to south-south-west of Heaton Hall with screen walls and wall attached to west More images | |
| Beehive Mill | Jersey Street, Ancoats | Textile mill | | Early 1820s | 11 November 1988 | SJ8509798719; 53°29′06″N 2°13′34″W | 1291735 | Beehive Mill More images | |
| Colonnade by lake to south of Heaton Hall | Heaton Park, Crumpsall | Colonnade | Francis Goodwin | 1824 | 25 February 1952 | SD8302603604; 53°31′44″N 2°15′27″W | 1282992 | Colonnade by lake to south of Heaton Hall More images | |
| Hope Mill | Pollard Street, Manchester | Textile mill | | 1824 | 6 June 1994 | SJ8573498512; 53°28′59″N 2°12′59″W | 1246950 | Hope Mill More images | |
| Brownsfield Mill | Binns Place, Ancoats | Textile mill | | c. 1825 | 11 November 1988 | SJ8489298400; 53°28′56″N 2°13′45″W | 1207994 | Brownsfield Mill More images | |
| Student Health Centre, University of Manchester | Oxford Road, Chorlton-on-Medlock | House | | Early 19th century | 18 December 1963 | SJ8484896141; 53°27′42″N 2°13′47″W | 1246450 | Student Health Centre, University of Manchester More images | |
| Church of St George | Chester Road, Hulme | Church | Francis Goodwin | 1828 | 3 October 1974 | SJ8288997296; 53°28′20″N 2°15′33″W | 1208640 | Church of St George More images | |
| Mrs Gaskell's House | Plymouth Grove, Chorlton-on-Medlock | House | Richard Lane (probable) | 1830–1840 | 25 February 1952 | SJ8540596333; 53°27′49″N 2°13′17″W | 1271082 | Mrs Gaskell's House More images | |
| Former Rochdale Canal warehouse | Tariff Street, Manchester | Warehouse | | 1836 | 3 October 1974 | SJ8480098336; 53°28′53″N 2°13′50″W | 1254689 | Former Rochdale Canal warehouse More images | |
| The Athenaeum | Princess Street, Manchester | Art gallery | Charles Barry | 1837 | 3 October 1974 | SJ8407797991; 53°28′42″N 2°14′29″W | 1270889 | The Athenaeum More images | |
| Former Unitarian chapel | Upper Brook Street, Chorlton-on-Medlock | Chapel | Charles Barry | 1839 | 3 October 1974 | SJ8474596980; 53°28′10″N 2°13′53″W | 1270670 | Former Unitarian chapel More images | |
| Pankhurst Centre | Nelson Street, Chorlton-on-Medlock | House | | c. 1840 | 10 June 1974 | SJ8499296288; 53°27′47″N 2°13′39″W | 1197896 | Pankhurst Centre More images | |
| G.M.B. National College | College Road, Whalley Range | College | Irwin and Chester | 1840–1843 | 3 October 1974 | SJ8254394730; 53°26′57″N 2°15′52″W | 1197762 | G.M.B. National College More images | |
| Doubling Mill and Fireproof Mill | Redhill Street, Ancoats | Textile mill | | 1842 | 20 June 1988 | SJ8510698622; 53°29′03″N 2°13′33″W | 1270855 | Doubling Mill and Fireproof Mill | |
| Church of St Peter | Old Market Street, Blackley | Church | E. H. Shellard | 1844 | 20 June 1988 | SD8564502998; 53°31′24″N 2°13′05″W | 1246275 | Church of St Peter More images | |
| Roman Catholic Church of St Mary (The Hidden Gem) | Mulberry Street, Manchester | Church | Richard Lane, M. E. Hadfield | 1844–1848 | 18 December 1963 | SJ8512494842; 53°28′49″N 2°14′47″W | 1197894 | Roman Catholic Church of St Mary (The Hidden Gem) More images | |
| Church of Holy Trinity | Platt Lane, Rusholme | Church | Edmund Sharpe | 1846 | 18 December 1963 | SJ8512494842; 53°27′00″N 2°13′32″W | 1246948 | Church of Holy Trinity More images | |
| 25 St Ann Street | St Ann Street, Manchester | Bank | John Edgar Gregan | 1848 | 25 February 1952 | SJ8382298379; 53°28′55″N 2°14′43″W | 1270792 | 25 St Ann Street More images | |
| Rose Hill | Longley Lane, Northenden | House | | Mid-19th century | 11 April 1991 | SJ8355389457; 53°24′06″N 2°14′56″W | 1291365 | Rose Hill More images | |
| Estate Exchange | Fountain Street, Manchester | Office | Thomas Worthington | 1852 | 3 October 1974 | SJ8409498236; 53°28′50″N 2°14′28″W | 1200835 | Estate Exchange More images | |
| 103 Princess Street | Princess Street, Manchester | Mechanics institute | John Edgar Gregan | 1854 | 11 May 1972 | SJ8422697827; 53°28′37″N 2°14′21″W | 1247391 | 103 Princess Street More images | |
| Free Trade Hall | Peter Street, Manchester | Assembly hall | Edward Walters | 1856 | 18 December 1963 | SJ8368397930; 53°28′40″N 2°14′50″W | 1246666 | Free Trade Hall More images | |
| Britannia Hotel | Portland Street, Manchester | Warehouse | Travis and Mangnall | 1856 | 25 February 1952 | SJ8433698041; 53°28′44″N 2°14′15″W | 1246952 | Britannia Hotel More images | |
| Church of St Mary | Upper Moss Lane, Hulme | Church | J. S. Crowther | 1858 | 3 October 1974 | SJ8339696089; 53°27′41″N 2°15′06″W | 1270659 | Church of St Mary More images | |
| Royal Bank of Scotland | Mosley Street, Manchester | Bank | Edward Walters | 1862 | 25 February 1952 | SJ8415398209; 53°28′49″N 2°14′25″W | 1220165 | Royal Bank of Scotland More images | |
| Church of St Cross | Ashton New Road, Clayton | Church | William Butterfield | 1866 | 18 December 1963 | SJ8801698539; 53°29′00″N 2°10′55″W | 1283072 | Church of St Cross More images | |
| Memorial Hall | Southmill Street, Manchester | Public hall | Thomas Worthington | 1866 | 14 February 1972 | SJ8376598041; 53°28′44″N 2°14′46″W | 1254637 | Memorial Hall More images | |
| Victoria Mill | Lower Vickers Street, Miles Platting | Textile mill | George Woodhouse | 1869 | 29 November 1988 | SJ8590999261; 53°29′24″N 2°12′50″W | 1197924 | Victoria Mill More images | |
| Victoria University of Manchester including Christie Library, Whitworth Hall | Oxford Road, Chorlton-on-Medlock | University | Alfred Waterhouse and Paul Waterhouse | 1870 | 18 December 1963 | SJ8457496590; 53°27′57″N 2°14′02″W | 1271428 | Victoria University of Manchester including Christie Library, Whitworth Hall More images | |
| Barton's Building including Barton Arcade | Deansgate, Manchester | Shop | Corbett, Raby and Sawyer | 1871 | 25 January 1972 | SJ8375098469; 53°28′58″N 2°14′47″W | 1200850 | Barton's Building including Barton Arcade More images | |
| Brookfield Unitarian Church | Hyde Road, Gorton | Church | Thomas Worthington | 1871 | 3 October 1974 | SJ8891795918; 53°27′36″N 2°10′06″W | 1218832 | Brookfield Unitarian Church More images | |
| Church of St John the Evangelist | Waterloo Road, Cheetham Hill | Church | Paley and Austin | 1871 | 3 October 1974 | SD8400700961; 53°30′18″N 2°14′33″W | 1254832 | Church of St John the Evangelist More images | |
| City Police Courts | Minshull Street, Manchester | Magistrates' court | Thomas Worthington | 1871 | 3 October 1974 | SJ8450498008; 53°28′43″N 2°14′06″W | 1219894 | City Police Courts More images | |
| Former Reform Club | Spring Gardens, Manchester | Club | Edward Salomons | 1871 | 3 October 1974 | SJ8402798281; 53°28′52″N 2°14′32″W | 1282987 | Former Reform Club More images | |
| Roman Catholic Church of St Francis and monastic building attached to church | Gorton Lane, Gorton | Church | E. W. Pugin | 1872 | 18 December 1963 | SJ8766296872; 53°28′06″N 2°11′14″W | 1282967 | Roman Catholic Church of St Francis and monastic building attached to church More images | |
| The Towers (Shirley Institute) | Wilmslow Road, Didsbury | House | Thomas Worthington | 1872 | 4 March 1974 | SJ8506390163; 53°24′29″N 2°13′34″W | 1270516 | The Towers (Shirley Institute) More images | |
| Lawrence Buildings | Central Street, Manchester | Office | Pennington and Bridgen | 1874 | 3 October 1974 | SJ8380298016; 53°28′43″N 2°14′44″W | 1220257 | Lawrence Buildings More images | |
| Peacock Mausoleum to west of Brookfield Unitarian Church | Hyde Road, Gorton | Mausoleum | Thomas Worthington | 1875 | 3 October 1974 | SJ8888795936; 53°27′36″N 2°10′08″W | 1218905 | Peacock Mausoleum to west of Brookfield Unitarian Church More images | |
| G Mex | Windmill Street, Manchester | Railway station | Sir John Fowler | 1879 | 18 December 1963 | SJ8373797786; 53°28′36″N 2°14′47″W | 1270514 | G Mex More images | |
| Anglican Church of St Benedict | Ardwick, Manchester | Church | J. S. Crowther | 1880 | 3 October 1974 | SJ8655896989; 53°28′10″N 2°12′14″W | 1207939 | Anglican Church of St Benedict More images | |
| Former Nicholls Hospital | Hyde Road, Ardwick | Hospital | Thomas Worthington | 1880 | 3 October 1974 | SJ8573496978; 53°28′10″N 2°12′59″W | 1291812 | Former Nicholls Hospital More images | |
| Manchester Law Library | Kennedy Street, Manchester | Library | Thomas Hartas | 1885 | 3 October 1974 | SJ8391998165; 53°28′48″N 2°14′38″W | 1219102 | Manchester Law Library More images | |
| Manchester Jewish Museum | Cheetham Hill Road, Cheetham Hill | Synagogue | Edward Salomons | 1889 | 3 October 1974 | SJ8431799904; 53°29′44″N 2°14′16″W | 1208472 | Manchester Jewish Museum More images | |
| Former Refuge Assurance Company offices | Oxford Street, Manchester | Office | Alfred Waterhouse | 1891 | 3 October 1974 | SJ8414597533; 53°28′27″N 2°14′25″W | 1271429 | Former Refuge Assurance Company offices More images | |
| Christ Church | Lloyd Street North, Moss Side | Church | Cecil Hardisty | 1896 | 24 April 1987 | SJ8441495852; 53°27′33″N 2°14′10″W | 1283013 | Christ Church More images | |
| Deansgate Goods Station and attached carriage ramp | Deansgate, Manchester | Warehouse | Alexander Ross, William Theodore Foxlee | 1896 | 4 May 1979 | SJ8356597867; 53°28′38″N 2°14′57″W | 1268529 | Deansgate Goods Station and attached carriage ramp More images | |
| Tootal, Broadhurst and Lee Building | Oxford Street, Manchester | Warehouse | J. Gibbons Sankey | 1896 | 3 October 1974 | SJ8402497647; 53°28′31″N 2°14′32″W | 1271294 | Tootal, Broadhurst and Lee Building More images | |
| Asia House | Princess Street, Manchester | Warehouse | Harry S. Fairhurst | 1900–1910 | 3 October 1974 | SJ8428897624; 53°28′30″N 2°14′17″W | 1247432 | Asia House More images | |
| Police and Fire Station | London Road, Manchester | Fire station | Woodhouse, Willoughby and Langham | 1901–1906 | 3 October 1974 | SJ8466497798; 53°28′36″N 2°13′57″W | 1197918 | Police and Fire Station More images | |
| Former National Westminster Bank | York Street, Manchester | Bank | Charles Henry Heathcote | 1902 | 4 January 1972 | SJ8408498297; 53°28′52″N 2°14′29″W | 1255042 | Former National Westminster Bank More images | |
| Midland Hotel | Peter Street, Manchester | Hotel | Charles Trubshaw | 1903 | 3 October 1974 | SJ8382897870; 53°28′38″N 2°14′42″W | 1271154 | Midland Hotel More images | |
| Victoria Baths with attached forecourt walls | Hathersage Road, Longsight | Baths | Thomas de Courcy Meade, Arthur Davies | 1906 | 18 January 1983 | SJ8572595951; 53°27′36″N 2°12′59″W | 1200808 | Victoria Baths with attached forecourt walls More images | |
| India House (including attached wrought iron gateway linked to Lancaster House) | Whitworth Street, Manchester | Warehouse | Harry S. Fairhurst | 1912 | 3 October 1974 | SJ8421597619; 53°28′30″N 2°14′21″W | 1254836 | India House (including attached wrought iron gateway linked to Lancaster House) More images | |
| Lancaster House | Whitworth Street, Manchester | Warehouse | Harry S. Fairhurst | 1912 | 3 October 1974 | SJ8427097647; 53°28′31″N 2°14′18″W | 1254887 | Lancaster House More images | |
| Paragon Mill | Jersey Street, Ancoats | Textile mill | | 1912 | 11 November 1988 | SJ8496198591; 53°29′02″N 2°13′41″W | 1219048 | Paragon Mill More images | |
| Royal Mill | Redhill Street, Ancoats | Textile mill | | 1912 | 11 November 1988 | SJ8497098596; 53°29′02″N 2°13′41″W | 1247474 | Royal Mill More images | |
| Manchester War Memorial | St Peter's Square, Manchester | Cenotaph | Edwin Lutyens | 1924 | 3 September 1974 | SJ8391997905; 53°28′39″N 2°14′38″W | 1270697 | Manchester War Memorial More images | |
| Former Midland Bank | King Street, Manchester | Bank | Edwin Lutyens with Whinney, Son and Austen Hall | 1929 | 3 October 1974 | SJ8401798235; 53°28′50″N 2°14′32″W | 1219241 | Former Midland Bank More images | |
| Church of St Nicholas | Kingsway, Burnage | Church | Welch, Cachemaille-Day and Lander | 1932 | 10 October 1980 | SJ8584491472; 53°25′11″N 2°12′52″W | 1219254 | Church of St Nicholas More images | |
| Central Public Library | St Peter's Square, Manchester | Library | Vincent Harris | 1934 | 3 October 1974 | SJ8386597942; 53°28′41″N 2°14′40″W | 1270759 | Central Public Library More images | |
| Church of St Michael and All Angels | Orton Road, Northenden | Church | Nugent Francis Cachemaille-Day | 1937 | 16 January 1981 | SJ8134490378; 53°24′36″N 2°16′56″W | 1271360 | Church of St Michael and All Angels More images | |
| Town Hall Extension | Lloyd Street, Manchester | Town hall | Vincent Harris | 1938 | 3 October 1974 | SJ8388598012; 53°28′43″N 2°14′39″W | 1197917 | Town Hall Extension More images | |
| Daily Express Building | Great Ancoats Street, Ancoats | Office and print works | Owen Williams | 1939 | 3 October 1974 | SJ8474598693; 53°29′05″N 2°13′53″W | 1218285 | Daily Express Building More images | |
| Wythenshawe Bus Depot | Harling Road, Sharston Industrial Area, Wythenshawe | Garage | G. Noel Hill | 1942 | 13 July 2001 | SJ8306089384; 53°24′04″N 2°15′22″W | 1389256 | Wythenshawe Bus Depot More images | |

== Oldham ==
Grade II* listed buildings in Oldham
| Name | Location | Type | Architect | Completed | Date designated | Grid ref. Geo-coordinates | Entry number | Image | Ref. |
|---|---|---|---|---|---|---|---|---|---|
| Higher Kinders | Kinders Lane, Saddleworth | House | | 1642 | 19 June 1967 | SE0001404660; 53°32′19″N 2°00′05″W | 1068176 | Higher Kinders More images | |
| Hathershaw Hall and Hathershaw Cottage | Hollins Road, Oldham | House | | 17th century | 24 December 1970 | SD9223903234; 53°31′33″N 2°07′07″W | 1217873 | Hathershaw Hall and Hathershaw Cottage More images | |
| Grotton Hall | Platting Road, Lydgate | House | | 1686 | 3 July 1986 | SD9719904854; 53°32′25″N 2°02′37″W | 1068157 | Upload Photo | |
| Foxdenton Hall | Foxdenton Lane, Chadderton | House | | 1730 | 30 May 1963 | SD8944404665; 53°32′19″N 2°09′39″W | 1356429 | Foxdenton Hall More images | |
| Heights Chapel, St Thomas Old Church | Broad Lane, Saddleworth | Church | | 1765 | 19 June 1967 | SD9821209061; 53°34′41″N 2°01′43″W | 1356677 | Heights Chapel, St Thomas Old Church More images | |
| Shore Mill | Delph, Saddleworth | Textile mill | | 1780s | 3 July 1986 | SD9860207943; 53°34′05″N 2°01′21″W | 1067445 | Upload Photo | |
| Independent Methodist Chapel | George Street, Oldham | Chapel | | 1815 | 2 August 1983 | SD9239104861; 53°32′25″N 2°06′59″W | 1201672 | Independent Methodist Chapel More images | |
| Church of St Mary and St Peter | Church Street, Oldham | Church | Richard Lane | 1830 | 23 January 1973 | SD9272905112; 53°32′33″N 2°06′40″W | 1292310 | Church of St Mary and St Peter More images | |
| Church of St Chad | Church Lane, Uppermill | Church | | 1831–1833 | 19 June 1967 | SE0075706405; 53°33′15″N 1°59′24″W | 1162501 | Church of St Chad More images | |
| Church of St Thomas | West Street, Lees | Church | E. H. Shellard | 1848 | 22 August 1967 | SD9528604454; 53°32′12″N 2°04′21″W | 1068071 | Church of St Thomas More images | |
| Church of St Anne | St Anne's Avenue, Royton | Church | Temple Moore | 1908–09 | 6 May 1987 | SD9199007049; 53°33′36″N 2°07′21″W | 1356418 | Church of St Anne More images | |
| Oldham War Memorial | Church Street, Oldham | War memorial | Albert Toft | 1923 | 23 January 1973 | SD9272905071; 53°32′32″N 2°06′40″W | 1210137 | Oldham War Memorial More images | |
| Crompton War Memorial | High Street, Shaw and Crompton | War memorial | Richard Goulden | 1923 | 6 October 1987 | SD9374108737; 53°34′31″N 2°05′46″W | 1068100 | Crompton War Memorial More images | |

== Rochdale ==
Grade II* listed buildings in Rochdale
| Name | Location | Type | Architect | Completed | Date designated | Grid ref. Geo-coordinates | Entry number | Image | Ref. |
|---|---|---|---|---|---|---|---|---|---|
| Church of St Chad | Sparrow Hill, Rochdale | Church | | 13th century | 25 October 1951 | SD8966613145; 53°36′53″N 2°09′28″W | 1045812 | Church of St Chad More images | |
| Stubley Old Hall | Stubley Brow, Rochdale | House | | 15th century | 2 January 1967 | SD9278316057; 53°38′28″N 2°06′38″W | 1162360 | Upload Photo | |
| Tonge Hall | Tonge Hall Close, Middleton | House | | 1580s | 15 March 1957 | SD8775605821; 53°32′56″N 2°11′11″W | 1068469 | Tonge Hall More images | |
| Shore Hall | Higher Shore Road, Littleborough | House | | 1605 | 2 January 1967 | SD9229117224; 53°39′05″N 2°07′05″W | 1068515 | Shore Hall More images | |
| Rough Bank Farmhouse | Rough Bank, Newhey | Farmhouse | | 1607 | 24 January 1967 | SD9471812318; 53°36′27″N 2°04′53″W | 1240266 | Rough Bank Farmhouse More images | |
| Clegg Hall | Clegg Hall Road, Littleborough | House | | c. 1610 | 10 August 1951 | SD9224214490; 53°37′37″N 2°07′08″W | 1309615 | Clegg Hall More images | |
| Windy Bank | Blackstone Edge Old Road, Littleborough | House | | Early 17th century | 2 January 1967 | SD9445016659; 53°38′47″N 2°05′08″W | 1068536 | Windy Bank More images | |
| Ye Olde Boars Head public house | Long Street, Middleton | Public house | | Early 17th century | 15 March 1957 | SD8705206266; 53°33′10″N 2°11′49″W | 1162256 | Ye Olde Boars Head public house More images | |
| Birchinley Manor Farmhouse | Wildhouse Lane, Milnrow | Farmhouse | | 1631 | 24 January 1967 | SD9300213778; 53°37′14″N 2°06′26″W | 1334330 | Birchinley Manor Farmhouse More images | |
| Dearnley Old Hall | New Road, Dearnley | House | | Early to mid-17th century | 2 January 1967 | SD9221215819; 53°38′20″N 2°07′09″W | 1309691 | Dearnley Old Hall More images | |
| Hopwood Hall | Rochdale Road, Middleton | House | | 17th century | 15 March 1957 | SD8748308299; 53°34′16″N 2°11′26″W | 1068466 | Upload Photo | |
| Old Bent House and Bent House Farmhouse | Halifax Road, Littleborough | Farmhouse | | 1691 | 2 January 1967 | SD9462417012; 53°38′58″N 2°04′58″W | 1356234 | Upload Photo | |
| Alkrington Hall | Hall Drive, Middleton | House | Giacomo Leoni | 1735–1756 | 15 March 1957 | SD8659005179; 53°32′35″N 2°12′14″W | 1068499 | Alkrington Hall More images | |
| Hope Chapel and Parson's House | Hope Street and Wilson Street, Rochdale | Chapel and house | | 1810 | 12 February 1985 | SD8964213919; 53°37′18″N 2°09′29″W | 1057694 | Hope Chapel and Parson's House More images | |
| Crimble Mill | Crimble Lane, Heywood | Textile mill | | c. 1825 | 15 December 1967 | SD8648911658; 53°36′05″N 2°12′20″W | 1187124 | Crimble Mill More images | |
| Former Queen Elizabeth Old Grammar School and adjoining schoolmaster's house | Boarshaw Road, Middleton | School and house | | 1586 (school), 1835–1839 (house) | 15 March 1957 | SD8741206354; 53°33′13″N 2°11′29″W | 1356228 | Former Queen Elizabeth Old Grammar School and adjoining schoolmaster's house More images | |
| Church of St Luke | York Street, Heywood | Church | Joseph Clarke | 1860–1862 | 12 February 1985 | SD8563710769; 53°35′36″N 2°13′07″W | 1346240 | Church of St Luke More images | |
| Long Street Methodist Church | Long Street, Middleton | Church | Edgar Wood | 1899 | 19 September 1969 | SD8704006201; 53°33′08″N 2°11′50″W | 1068504 | Long Street Methodist Church More images | |
| Elm Street School | Elm Street, Middleton | School | Edgar Wood and J. Henry Sellers | 1908–1910 | 19 September 1969 | SD8838205948; 53°33′00″N 2°10′37″W | 1356229 | Upload Photo | |
| Church of St Aidan | Manchester Road, Sudden | Church | Temple Moore | 1913–1915 | 12 February 1985 | SD8832511642; 53°36′04″N 2°10′40″W | 1084241 | Church of St Aidan More images | |
| Roman Catholic Church of St John the Baptist | Dowling Street, Rochdale | Church | Ernest Bower Norris and Henry Oswald Hill | 1927 | 15 September 1998 | SD8975312787; 53°36′41″N 2°09′18″W | 1376506 | Roman Catholic Church of St John the Baptist More images | |

== Salford ==
Grade II* listed buildings in Salford
| Name | Location | Type | Architect | Completed | Date designated | Grid ref. Geo-coordinates | Entry number | Image | Ref. |
|---|---|---|---|---|---|---|---|---|---|
| Kersal Cell | Whitewater Drive, Salford | House | | 16th century | 31 January 1952 | SD8095801536; 53°30′37″N 2°17′19″W | 1386144 | Kersal Cell More images | |
| Church of the Sacred Trinity | Trinity Market, Salford | Church | | 1752 | 31 January 1952 | SJ8348698704; 53°29′05″N 2°15′01″W | 1386185 | Church of the Sacred Trinity More images | |
| Church of St Philip | St Philip's Place, Salford | Church | Robert Smirke | 1825 | 31 January 1952 | SJ8264098619; 53°29′02″N 2°15′47″W | 1386165 | Church of St Philip More images | |
| Southern Railway Viaduct and Colonnade | New Bailey Street, Ordsall | Viaduct and colonnade | John Hawkshaw | 1844 | 18 January 1980 | SJ8321198497; 53°28′59″N 2°15′16″W | 1386162 | Southern Railway Viaduct and Colonnade More images | |
| Cathedral of St John and attached Cathedral House | Chapel Street, Salford | Cathedral | Matthew Ellison Hadfield | 1845 | 18 January 1980 | SJ8278998598; 53°29′02″N 2°15′39″W | 1386115 | Cathedral of St John and attached Cathedral House More images | |
| Former Public Baths | Collier Street, Salford | Baths | Thomas Worthington | 1855 | 18 January 1980 | SJ8341399003; 53°29′15″N 2°15′05″W | 1386123 | Upload Photo | |
| Church of St Luke | Liverpool Street, Pendleton | Church | George Gilbert Scott | 1865 | 18 January 1980 | SJ8001398621; 53°29′02″N 2°18′10″W | 1386145 | Church of St Luke More images | |
| Church of St Peter | Chorley Road, Swinton | Church | George Edmund Street | 1869 | 30 March 1966 | SD7745501745; 53°30′43″N 2°20′29″W | 1067510 | Church of St Peter More images | |
| Waterpark Hall (former Congregational Church, latterly United Reformed Church) | Montpellier Mews, Broughton Park | Church | S. W. Dawkes | 1872–1874 | 18 January 1980 | SD8319602138; 53°30′56″N 2°15′18″W | 1386187 | Upload Photo | |
| Monton Unitarian Church | Monton Green, Monton | Church | Thomas Worthington | 1873–1875 | 9 July 1979 | SJ7650499638; 53°29′35″N 2°21′20″W | 1067501 | Monton Unitarian Church More images | |
| Church of St Andrew | Chadwick Road, Eccles | Church | Herbert Edward Tijou (1877–1879), J. S. Crowther (1889) | 1877–1879, 1889 (tower) | 16 July 1987 | SJ7740098764; 53°29′06″N 2°20′31″W | 1309482 | Church of St Andrew More images | |
| Barton Bridge, Barton Aqueduct and control tower (that part in Eccles) | Barton upon Irwell | Aqueduct | Edward Leader Williams | c. 1894 | 16 July 1987 | SJ7663397602; 53°28′29″N 2°21′13″W | 1162870 | Barton Bridge, Barton Aqueduct and control tower (that part in Eccles) More images | |
| Salford Lads' Club | Coronation Street, Ordsall | Club | Henry Lord | 1903 | 19 June 2026 | SJ8189297815; 53°28′37″N 2°16′28″W | 1390580 | Salford Lads' Club More images | |
| Manchester Tennis and Racquet Club | Blackfriars Road, Salford | Sports club | George Tunstal Redmayne | 1925 | 21 January 1996 | SJ8334798832; 53°29′09″N 2°15′09″W | 1386080 | Manchester Tennis and Racquet Club More images | |

== Stockport ==
Grade II* listed buildings in Stockport
| Name | Location | Type | Architect | Completed | Date designated | Grid ref. Geo-coordinates | Entry number | Image | Ref. |
|---|---|---|---|---|---|---|---|---|---|
| Old Manor Farm | Stockport Road, Marple | Farmhouse | | 15th century | 20 December 1967 | SJ9397988679; 53°23′42″N 2°05′31″W | 1242469 | Upload Photo | |
| Staircase House | Market Place, Stockport | House | | Late 15th century | 10 March 1975 | SJ8970490552; 53°24′42″N 2°09′23″W | 1356855 | Staircase House More images | |
| 10 Great Underbank | Great Underbank, Stockport | House | | 16th century | 14 May 1952 | SJ8956790445; 53°24′39″N 2°09′30″W | 1356829 | 10 Great Underbank More images | |
| Chadkirk Chapel | Chadkirk Lane, Bredbury | Chapel | | 16th century | 29 March 1966 | SJ9400390218; 53°24′31″N 2°05′30″W | 1259981 | Chadkirk Chapel More images | |
| New Hall Farm | Old Hall Lane, Woodford | Farmhouse | | 1630 | 9 August 1966 | SJ8957281405; 53°19′46″N 2°09′29″W | 1260441 | New Hall Farm More images | |
| Moseley Old Hall | Cuthbert Road, Cheadle | House | | 1666 | 24 March 1950 | SJ8642188905; 53°23′48″N 2°12′20″W | 1260364 | Moseley Old Hall More images | |
| Mellor Hall and Mellor Hall Farmhouse | Church Road, Mellor | House | | 1688 (possible) | 20 December 1967 | SJ9857589287; 53°24′01″N 2°01′22″W | 1241992 | Mellor Hall and Mellor Hall Farmhouse More images | |
| Former Rectory | Churchgate, Stockport | Rectory | | Mid-18th century | 14 May 1952 | SJ8991690344; 53°24′35″N 2°09′11″W | 1356827 | Former Rectory More images | |
| Gateway to Parish Church of St Mary and fountain to side | Churchgate, Stockport | Gate | Lewis Wyatt | 1812 | 10 March 1975 | SJ8973690516; 53°24′41″N 2°09′21″W | 1067202 | Gateway to Parish Church of St Mary and fountain to side More images | |
| Woodbank Villa and entrance portico | Woodbank Memorial Park, Stockport | House | Thomas Harrison | 1812–1814 | 10 March 1975 | 53°24′36″N 2°07′52″W | 1162994 | Woodbank Villa and entrance portico More images | |
| Railway Viaduct | Viaduct Street, Stockport | Viaduct | George W. Buck | 1840 (opened) | 10 March 1975 | SJ8910590246; 53°24′32″N 2°09′55″W | 1356861 | Railway Viaduct More images | |
| Abney Hall | Manchester Road, Cheadle | House | Travis and Mangnall (probable) | 1847 | 30 June 1975 | SJ8595389237; 53°23′59″N 2°12′46″W | 1241730 | Abney Hall More images | |
| Houldsworth Mill | Houldsworth Street, Reddish | Textile mill | Abraham Henthorn Stott | 1865 | 10 March 1975 | SJ8907393324; 53°26′12″N 2°09′57″W | 1067171 | Houldsworth Mill More images | |
| Church of St Martin | Brabyns Brow, Marple Bridge | Church | J. D. Sedding | 1869–70 | 11 October 1985 | SJ9634989345; 53°24′03″N 2°03′23″W | 1241823 | Church of St Martin More images | |
| Houldsworth Working Men's Club | Leamington Road, Reddish | Working men's club | Abraham Henthorn Stott | 1874 | 30 October 1973 | SJ8930493459; 53°26′16″N 2°09′45″W | 1067173 | Houldsworth Working Men's Club More images | |
| Houldsworth School | Liverpool Street, Reddish | School | Alfred Waterhouse | 1874 | 30 October 1973 | SJ8924493588; 53°26′20″N 2°09′48″W | 1067180 | Houldsworth School More images | |
| Wall to west of Houldsworth School | Liverpool Street, Reddish | Wall | Alfred Waterhouse | 1874 | 10 March 1975 | SJ8921693580; 53°26′20″N 2°09′50″W | 1162583 | Wall to west of Houldsworth School | |
| Rectory to Church of St Elisabeth | Liverpool Street, Reddish | Rectory | Alfred Waterhouse | 1874 | 30 October 1973 | SJ8923593536; 53°26′19″N 2°09′49″W | 1067181 | Rectory to Church of St Elisabeth More images | |
| Wall to west of St Elisabeth's rectory | Liverpool Street, Reddish | Wall | Alfred Waterhouse | 1874 | 10 March 1975 | SJ8921593535; 53°26′19″N 2°09′50″W | 1356853 | Wall to west of St Elisabeth's rectory | |
| Wall to the west and south of Church of St Elisabeth | Leamington Road, Reddish | Wall | Alfred Waterhouse | 1882–83 | 10 March 1975 | SJ8924593445; 53°26′16″N 2°09′48″W | 1067172 | Wall to the west and south of Church of St Elisabeth | |
| Town Hall | Wellington Road South, Stockport | Town hall | Alfred Brumwell Thomas | 1904–1908 | 10 March 1975 | SJ8956489920; 53°24′22″N 2°09′30″W | 1067166 | Town Hall More images | |
| Pear New Mill | Stockport Road West, Bredbury | Textile mill | Stott and Sons | 1908–1912 | 20 June 1991 | SJ9119690793; 53°24′50″N 2°08′02″W | 1240634 | Pear New Mill More images | |
| War Memorial Art Gallery | Wellington Road South, Stockport | Art gallery | James Theodore Halliday | 1925 | 11 July 2007 | SJ8953289777; 53°24′17″N 2°09′32″W | 1392091 | War Memorial Art Gallery More images | |
| Plaza Cinema | Mersey Square, Stockport | Cinema and theatre | William Thornley | 1932–33 | 12 March 1997 | SJ8937290272; 53°24′33″N 2°09′41″W | 1257697 | Plaza Cinema More images | |

== Tameside ==
Grade II* listed buildings in Tameside
| Name | Location | Type | Architect | Completed | Date designated | Grid ref. Geo-coordinates | Entry number | Image | Ref. |
|---|---|---|---|---|---|---|---|---|---|
| Cross | Warhill, Mottram in Longdendale | Sundial | | Medieval | 6 February 1986 | SJ9940295234; 53°27′14″N 2°00′38″W | 1068028 | Cross More images | |
| Church of St Michael and All Angels | Warhill, Mottram in Longdendale | Church | | 15th century | 1 November 1966 | SJ9943195293; 53°27′16″N 2°00′36″W | 1356436 | Church of St Michael and All Angels More images | |
| Church of St Lawrence | Stockport Road, Denton | Church | | c. 1530 | 27 November 1967 | SJ9264095055; 53°27′08″N 2°06′44″W | 1067971 | Church of St Lawrence More images | |
| Hyde Hall | Town Lane, Denton | House | | Late 16th century | 27 November 1967 | SJ9180594273; 53°26′43″N 2°07′29″W | 1318129 | Hyde Hall More images | |
| Staley Hall and adjoining west wing | Millbrook, Stalybridge | House | | Late 16th century | 9 August 1966 | SJ9756299706; 53°29′39″N 2°02′18″W | 1163021 | Staley Hall and adjoining west wing More images | |
| Old Hall Chapel | Old Hall Street, Dukinfield | Chapel | | Late 16th to early 17th century | 17 December 1970 | SJ9349497026; 53°28′12″N 2°05′58″W | 1356422 | Upload Photo | |
| Buckley Hill Farmhouse | Lumb Lane, Droylsden | Farmhouse | | 17th century | 17 November 1966 | SJ9180799671; 53°29′37″N 2°07′30″W | 1163826 | Buckley Hill Farmhouse More images | |
| Apethorn Farmhouse | Apethorn Lane, Hyde | Farmhouse | | 17th to 19th century | 22 December 1969 | SJ9447893479; 53°26′17″N 2°05′05″W | 1068079 | Apethorn Farmhouse More images | |
| Broadbottom Hall | Bostock Road, Broadbottom | House | | 1680 | 1 November 1966 | SJ9948593629; 53°26′22″N 2°00′33″W | 1068052 | Broadbottom Hall More images | |
| Old Hall Fold | Newmarket Road, Ashton-under-Lyne | House | | 18th century | 12 January 1967 | SD9268900389; 53°30′01″N 2°06′42″W | 1067997 | Old Hall Fold More images | |
| 20–23 and 23A Fairfield Square | Fairfield, Droylsden | House | | 1785 | 17 November 1966 | SJ9014997672; 53°28′32″N 2°09′00″W | 1356489 | 20–23 and 23A Fairfield Square More images | |
| Fairfield Moravian Church | Fairfield Square, Droylsden | Church | | c. 1785 | 17 November 1966 | SJ9016197617; 53°28′31″N 2°08′59″W | 1067981 | Fairfield Moravian Church More images | |
| Church of St Peter | Manchester Road, Ashton-under-Lyne | Church | Francis Goodwin | 1821–1824 | 12 January 1967 | SJ9306798585; 53°29′02″N 2°06′21″W | 1067994 | Church of St Peter More images | |
| Dukinfield Old Chapel | Old Road, Dukinfield | Chapel | Robert Tattersall | 1838–1841 | 17 December 1970 | SJ9435997963; 53°28′42″N 2°05′11″W | 1068077 | Dukinfield Old Chapel More images | |
| Albion Warehouse | Penny Meadow, Ashton-under-Lyne | Warehouse | Paull and Ayliffe | 1861–62 | 12 January 1967 | SJ9431599253; 53°29′24″N 2°05′14″W | 1068001 | Albion Warehouse | |
| Former Municipal Baths | Henry Square, Ashton-under-Lyne | Baths | George Thomas Robinson and Henry Paull | 1870–71 | 2 April 1975 | SJ9335298687; 53°29′05″N 2°06′06″W | 1067992 | Former Municipal Baths More images | |
| St Anne's Rectory | St Anne's Drive, Denton | Rectory | J. M. and H. Taylor | 1882 | 20 July 1977 | SJ9341195603; 53°27′26″N 2°06′03″W | 1067970 | St Anne's Rectory More images | |
| Cavendish Mill | Cavendish Street, Ashton-under-Lyne | Textile mill | Potts, Pickup & Dixon | 1884–85 | 24 September 1990 | SJ9364098581; 53°29′02″N 2°05′50″W | 1067948 | Cavendish Mill More images | |
| Albion Congregational Church | Stamford Street East, Ashton-under-Lyne | Church | John Brooke | 1890–1895 | 12 January 1967 | SJ9432699003; 53°29′16″N 2°05′13″W | 1356460 | Albion Congregational Church More images | |
| War Memorial | Trinity Street, Stalybridge | War memorial | Ferdinand Blundstone | c. 1921 | 6 February 1986 | SJ9634198565; 53°29′02″N 2°03′24″W | 1163074 | War Memorial More images | |
| Ashton-under-Lyne and District War Memorial | Memorial Gardens, Ashton-under-Lyne | War memorial | Percy Howard | 1922 | 14 July 1987 | SJ9426499120; 53°29′20″N 2°05′16″W | 1067996 | Ashton-under-Lyne and District War Memorial More images | |

== Trafford ==
Grade II* listed buildings in Trafford
| Name | Location | Type | Architect | Completed | Date designated | Grid ref. Geo-coordinates | Entry number | Image | Ref. |
|---|---|---|---|---|---|---|---|---|---|
| Church of St Michael | Church Road, Flixton | Church | | 15th century | 29 June 1966 | SJ7472993965; 53°26′31″N 2°22′55″W | 1067876 | Church of St Michael More images | |
| Dunham Massey sawmill | Dunham Park, Dunham Massey | Saw mill | | 1616 (possible), 17th century | 5 March 1959 | SJ7345787247; 53°22′53″N 2°24′02″W | 1067903 | Dunham Massey sawmill More images | |
| Hale Chapel | Chapel Lane, Hale Barns | Chapel | | 1723 | 2 March 1950 | SJ7914285446; 53°21′56″N 2°18′54″W | 1356500 | Hale Chapel More images | |
| Church of St George | Manchester Road, Carrington | Church | Isaac Shaw | 1759 | 5 March 1959 | SJ7279592666; 53°25′48″N 2°24′39″W | 1067868 | Church of St George More images | |
| Church of St Margaret | Dunham Road, Altrincham | Church | W. Hayley | 1855 | 12 July 1985 | SJ7601787852; 53°23′13″N 2°21′43″W | 1325200 | Church of St Margaret More images | |
| Church of St Mary the Virgin | Bowdon Park Road, Bowdon | Church | William Hayward Brakspear | 1860 | 12 July 1985 | SJ7586486846; 53°22′40″N 2°21′51″W | 1122650 | Church of St Mary the Virgin More images | |
| Church of St John the Divine | Brooklands Road, Sale | Church | Alfred Waterhouse | 1868 | 3 October 1974 | SJ7891390316; 53°24′33″N 2°19′07″W | 1261946 | Church of St John the Divine More images | |
| Denzell House | Dunham Road, Bowdon | House | Clegg and Knowles | 1874 | 12 July 1985 | SJ7536887360; 53°22′57″N 2°22′18″W | 1067925 | Denzell House More images | |
| Church of St Martin | Church Lane, Sale | Church | William Hayward Brakspear | 1887 | 11 November 1966 | SJ7723892993; 53°26′00″N 2°20′39″W | 1067893 | Church of St Martin More images | |
| Halecroft | Hale Road, Hale | House | Edgar Wood | 1890 | 13 October 1975 | SJ7867686399; 53°22′26″N 2°19′19″W | 1356501 | Halecroft More images | |
| Barton Bridge, Barton Aqueduct, and control tower (that part in Davyhulme) | Manchester Ship Canal, Urmston | Aqueduct | Edward Leader Williams | c. 1894 | 30 June 1987 | SJ7664597571; 53°28′28″N 2°21′12″W | 1356522 | Barton Bridge, Barton Aqueduct, and control tower (that part in Davyhulme) More images | |

== Wigan ==
Grade II* listed buildings in Wigan
| Name | Location | Type | Architect | Completed | Date designated | Grid ref. Geo-coordinates | Entry number | Image | Ref. |
|---|---|---|---|---|---|---|---|---|---|
| Mab's Cross | Standishgate, Wigan | Boundary cross | | 13th century | 11 July 1983 | SD5852706268; 53°33′05″N 2°37′39″W | 1384526 | Mab's Cross More images | |
| Church of All Saints | Wallgate, Wigan | Church | | 15th century | 24 October 1951 | SD5818005674; 53°32′46″N 2°37′57″W | 1384556 | Church of All Saints More images | |
| Lightshaw Hall | Lightshaw Lane, Golborne | Farmhouse | | 16th century | 15 November 1966 | SJ6148399546; 53°29′28″N 2°34′55″W | 1261780 | Lightshaw Hall More images | |
| Morleys Hall | Morley's Lane, Astley | House | | 16th century | 18 July 1966 | SJ6895899261; 53°29′21″N 2°28′10″W | 1318255 | Morleys Hall More images | |
| Bispham Hall | Crank Road, Billinge Higher End | House | | 1573 | 23 August 1966 | SD5234602469; 53°31′00″N 2°43′13″W | 1068434 | Upload Photo | |
| Winstanley Hall | Pemberton Road, Winstanley | House | | c. 1573 | 23 August 1966 | SD5451803107; 53°31′22″N 2°41′15″W | 1287365 | Winstanley Hall More images | |
| Worthington Hall | Chorley Lane, Worthington | Farmhouse | | 1577 | 19 November 1951 | SD5808910942; 53°35′36″N 2°38′05″W | 1228585 | Worthington Hall | |
| Bradley Hall | Bradley Lane, Standish | House | | 16th or 17th century | 24 May 1982 | SD5704211010; 53°35′38″N 2°39′02″W | 1228439 | Bradley Hall | |
| Light Oaks Hall | Light Oaks Road, Glazebury | House | | Early 17th century | 7 November 1966 | SJ6755896706; 53°27′58″N 2°29′25″W | 1068483 | Light Oaks Hall More images | |
| Manor House | Chorley Road, Worthington | House | | 17th century | 22 February 1967 | SD5789510213; 53°35′12″N 2°38′15″W | 1228480 | Manor House More images | |
| Kirkless Hall and Kirkless Hall Farmhouse | Farm Lane, Aspull | House | | 17th century | 9 June 1966 | SD6034006359; 53°33′08″N 2°36′00″W | 1068423 | Kirkless Hall and Kirkless Hall Farmhouse More images | |
| Damhouse, formerly Astley Hall | Church Road, Astley | House | | 1650 | 18 July 1966 | SD6986900902; 53°30′14″N 2°27′21″W | 1163258 | Damhouse, formerly Astley Hall More images | |
| Giant's Hall Farmhouse | Standish Wood Lane, Standish | Farmhouse | | c. 1675 | 9 August 1966 | SD5668207761; 53°33′53″N 2°39′20″W | 1287164 | Giant's Hall Farmhouse | |
| Chanters Farmhouse | Chanters Avenue, Atherton | Farmhouse | | 1678 | 15 July 1966 | SD6811202920; 53°31′19″N 2°28′57″W | 1309438 | Chanters Farmhouse More images | |
| Ackhurst Hall | Ackhurst Lane, Orrell | Farmhouse | | 1686 | 30 March 1966 | SD5454206866; 53°33′23″N 2°41′16″W | 1228341 | Ackhurst Hall More images | |
| Alder House | Alder Street, Atherton | House | | 1697 | 15 July 1966 | SD6801103162; 53°31′27″N 2°29′02″W | 1068470 | Alder House More images | |
| Astley Vicarage | Church Road, Astley | Vicarage | | 1704 | 18 July 1966 | SD6998400792; 53°30′11″N 2°27′14″W | 1356223 | Astley Vicarage More images | |
| Chowbent Unitarian Chapel | Bolton Old Road, Atherton | Chapel | | 1721 | 15 July 1966 | SD6790403215; 53°31′29″N 2°29′08″W | 1068472 | Chowbent Unitarian Chapel More images | |
| Church of St Mary | Standishgate, Wigan | Church | | 1818 | 24 October 1951 | SD5851306150; 53°33′01″N 2°37′39″W | 1384525 | Church of St Mary More images | |
| Church of St John | Standishgate, Wigan | Church | | 1819 | 24 October 1951 | SD5848906039; 53°32′58″N 2°37′41″W | 1384523 | Church of St John More images | |
| Haigh Hall | School Lane, Haigh | House | James Lindsay | 1827–1840 | 19 November 1951 | SD5975208515; 53°34′18″N 2°36′33″W | 1228292 | Haigh Hall More images | |
| Gateway and lodges to Haigh Hall Park | Wigan Lane, Wigan | House | | c. 1840 | 24 October 1951 | SD5849407164; 53°33′34″N 2°37′41″W | 1384570 | Gateway and lodges to Haigh Hall Park More images | |
| Barn and stable to east of Winstanley Hall and two attached gateways | Pemberton Road, Winstanley | Farm buildings | | 1859 | 23 August 1986 | SD5450903088; 53°31′21″N 2°41′15″W | 1228164 | Upload Photo | |
| Church of St James with St Thomas | Hardman Street, Poolstock | Church | E. G. Paley | 1863–1866 | 11 July 1983 | SD5782004545; 53°32′09″N 2°38′16″W | 1384468 | Church of St James with St Thomas More images | |
| Church of St Mary | St Mary's Way, Leigh | Church | Paley and Austin | 1873 | 7 November 1966 | SD6562300302; 53°29′54″N 2°31′11″W | 1356221 | Church of St Mary More images | |
| Church of St Michael and All Angels | Leigh Road, Howe Bridge | Church | Paley and Austin | 1875–1877 | 31 July 1996 | SD6649302447; 53°31′03″N 2°30′24″W | 1268288 | Church of St Michael and All Angels More images | |
| Church of St Michael | Duke Street, Swinley | Church | George Edmund Street | 1875–1878 | 11 July 1983 | SD5837706555; 53°33′14″N 2°37′47″W | 1384535 | Church of St Michael More images | |
| Church of St Peter | Firs Lane, Westleigh | Church | Paley and Austin | 1880–81 | 27 July 1987 | SD6442800327; 53°29′54″N 2°32′16″W | 1068481 | Church of St Peter More images | |
| Church of St Matthew | Billinge Road, Wigan | Church | Paley, Austin and Paley | 1892–1894 | 11 July 1983 | SD5552303830; 53°31′45″N 2°40′21″W | 1384453 | Church of St Matthew More images | |
| Leigh Mill | Park Lane, Bedford | Textile mill | Bradshaw Gass & Hope | 1913 | 25 April 1990 | SJ6737999725; 53°29′36″N 2°29′35″W | 1253119 | Leigh Mill More images | |
| War memorial south of Church of All Saints with encircling railings | Wallgate, Wigan | War memorial | Giles Gilbert Scott | 1925 | 24 October 1951 | SD5818505640; 53°32′45″N 2°37′57″W | 1384562 | War memorial south of Church of All Saints with encircling railings More images | |

== Total Grade II* listed buildings by borough ==
The table shows the total number of Grade II* listed buildings by borough. Although the borough totals sum to 243, the Barton Swing Aqueduct is listed under both Salford and Trafford, so the official total in the National Heritage List for England is 242.

Total Grade II* listed buildings by borough
| Borough | Grade II* listed buildings |
|---|---|
| Bolton | 17 |
| Bury | 10 |
| Manchester | 81 |
| Oldham | 13 |
| Rochdale | 21 |
| Salford | 14 |
| Stockport | 24 |
| Tameside | 21 |
| Trafford | 11 |
| Wigan | 31 |
| Total | 243 |

== See also ==
- Architecture of Manchester
- Conservation in the United Kingdom
- Grade I listed buildings in Greater Manchester
- Grade II listed buildings in Manchester
- List of tallest buildings and structures in Greater Manchester
- Scheduled monuments in Greater Manchester
