= Jackson's Warehouse =

Listed building in Manchester, England

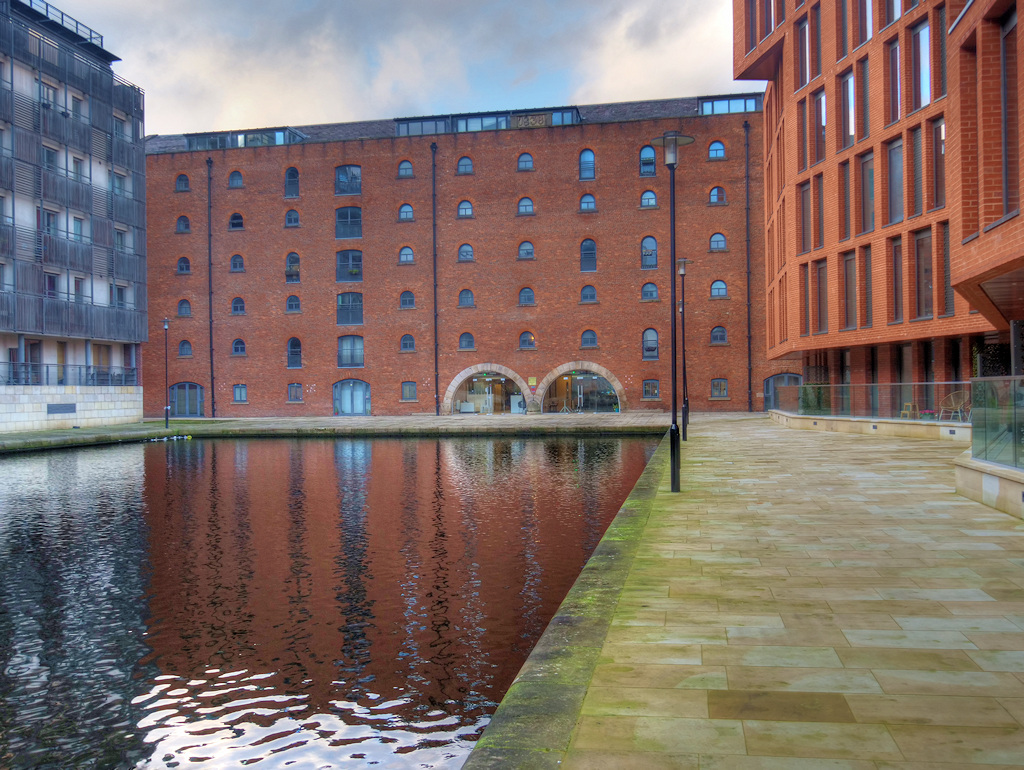
- Jackson's Warehouse in 2020

- Location within Greater Manchester
- Alternative names: Jacksons Warehouse

General information
- Status: Converted to mixed use
- Location: Tariff Street, Piccadilly Basin, Manchester, England
- Coordinates: 53.4815°N 2.2306°W
- Year built: 1836
- Renovated: 2003 (converted)

Technical details
- Material: Brown brick
- Floor count: 6

Design and construction
- Designations

Listed Building – Grade II*
- Official name: Former Rochdale Canal warehouse
- Designated: 3 October 1974
- Reference no.: 1254689

Jackson's Warehouse (also known as Jacksons Warehouse and officially listed as Former Rochdale Canal warehouse) is a 19th-century former canal warehouse on Tariff Street in the Piccadilly Basin area of Manchester, England. Built in 1836 for the Rochdale Canal Company, it remained in commercial use into the mid‑20th century before being designated a Grade II* listed building in 1974. A major restoration in 2003 converted it into residential accommodation with commercial space.

== History ==
The warehouse was built in 1836, according to its official listing, and was constructed for the Rochdale Canal Company. It was still in use as a warehouse in 1961.

On 3 October 1974, it was designated a Grade II* listed building.

In 2003 a £4.25 million restoration project converted the former warehouse into residential accommodation, with a restaurant and commercial space on the lower ground floor.

== Architecture ==
The building is constructed of brown brick with some sandstone detailing, and its roof cannot be seen from ground level. It has a long rectangular plan running east to west and rises six storeys, with a south front of 13 bays. In the middle section are paired arched openings used for shipping, marked by raised keystones. The other openings are small arched windows, though several have been blocked or altered, and most of those on the second floor have been replaced with wider rectangular windows. A parapet runs along the top, with a raised panel above the shipping openings carrying the date "1836". The gable ends each have four windows and tall arched loading openings that run the full height of the wall, along with altered windows and broad coping stones. The rear elevation includes three similar loading openings, two still fitted with semi-circular canopies for crane equipment, and matching windows.

== See also ==
- Grade II* listed buildings in Greater Manchester
- Listed buildings in Manchester-M1
