= Moseley Old Hall, Cheadle =

Country house in Greater Manchester, England

Moseley Old Hall
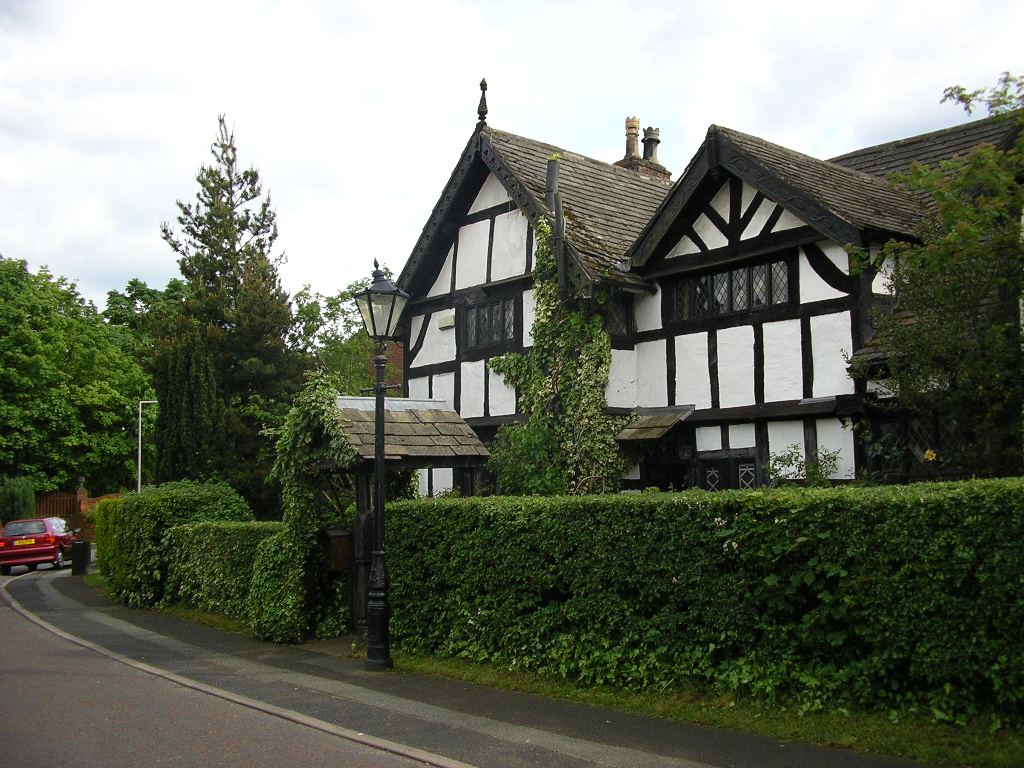
- The main entrance of Moseley Old Hall

- Location within Greater Manchester

General information
- Location: Cuthbert Road, Cheadle, Greater Manchester, England
- Coordinates: 53.3968°N 2.2056°W
- Completed: 17th century
- Client: Sir Nicholas Moseley

Design and construction
- Designations

Listed Building – Grade II*
- Official name: Moseley Old Hall
- Designated: 24 March 1950
- Reference no.: 1260364

Moseley Old Hall is a small 17th-century country house on Cuthbert Road in Cheadle, a suburban village within the Metropolitan Borough of Stockport, Greater Manchester, England.

== History ==
The construction date of the hall is uncertain, although there is an inscription carved into the doorway, reading, 'R.M. 1663'. The hall was built for Sir Nicholas Moseley on an open woodland plot; it is now at the end of a suburban road.

It was reputed that Bonnie Prince Charlie visited the hall in the 1740s during the Jacobite rebellion.

In the early 1900s, a significant deal took place in the morning room of the hall, ensuring the future of Newton Heath Football Club, which would later become known as Manchester United.

On 24 March 1950, Moseley Old Hall was designated a Grade II* listed building.

Having been listed on Historic England's Heritage at Risk Register in 2019 due to structural issues, the hall came off the register in 2024 after undergoing restoration.

== See also ==
- Grade II* listed buildings in Greater Manchester
- Listed buildings in Cheadle and Gatley
