= List of streets and roads in Manchester =

The following is a list of notable streets and roads in Manchester, England.

Image	Street name	A/B roads	Established	Description/notes	Landmarks
	Canal Street		Early 19th century	At the centre of Manchester's Gay Village district	Rochdale Canal which runs parallel
	Cheetham Hill Road	A665	Roman period	Connects to Corporation Street to Whitefield becomes Bury Old Road in Crumpsall	Manchester Jewish Museum, Peninsula Building
	Corporation Street		c. 1848	Partly pedestrianised. Scene of the 1996 Manchester bombing	Urbis, The Printworks, Corn Exchange (now The Triangle), Exchange Square, Corporation Street Bridge.
	Deansgate	A56	Anglo-Saxon period	Cuts the city centre in two and runs roughly north–south in a near straight route through the western part of the city centre. It is one of the oldest thoroughfares through the city and is the longest road in the city centre at over one mile long.	The Moon Under Water, listed in Guinness' as the largest public house in Britain. Beetham Tower, John Rylands Library, 1 The Avenue, Great Northern Warehouse, Kendals and Manchester Cathedral.
	Great Ancoats Street	A665		In the suburb of Ancoats, it forms one of the stretches of the city's inner ring road	Albion Mill, Brownsfield Mill, Daily Express Building
	King Street		18th century	King Street forms an upmarket part of the city centre: its eastern part was once mainly the site of banks but now has shops as well; the western part is a long-established shopping street.	Conservation area for Listed Buildings (11 buildings listed Grade II, two listed Grade II* and one Grade I). Notable buildings include 100 King Street by Sir Edwin Lutyens, Ship Canal House and the Reform Club by Edward Salomons.
	Kingsway	A34	1928	Major thoroughfare into Manchester from southern suburbs such as Cheadle and Burnage	Parrs Wood Entertainment Centre
	Market Street		Before 1417	Pedestrian zone end to end; High Street tram stop; Royal Exchange	
	Mosley Street		Late 18th century	A street only for Metrolink trams and previously buses which joined the street at Lower Mosley Street. Since May 2011, buses were segregated and travel down Portland Street instead of Mosley Street to get to Piccadilly Gardens bus station	Midland Hotel, One St Peter's Square, Manchester Art Gallery, Portico Library, 38 and 42 Mosley Street, 1 New York Street, Mosley Street tram stop
	New Cathedral Street		1990s	Rebuilt since the 1996 IRA bombing of the city centre	
	Oldham Street		Early 18th century	Forms part of the city's historic Northern Quarter district	Afflecks Palace
	Oxford Road		Late 18th century		
Peter Street from Deansgate	Peter Street	A34	Late 18th century	Major thoroughfare running east–west between St Peter's Square and Deansgate	Albert Hall, Free Trade Hall, Midland Hotel, Theatre Royal
	Portland Street		Early 19th century		Britannia Hotel
	Princess Street		Late 18th century	A 3-lane partially one-way street heading out of Manchester city centre	The Athenaeum, Asia House
	Quay Street	A34	Early 18th century		Home of ITV Granada Television since 1956 at Granada Studios. Recognised landmarks include the Manchester Opera House and Sunlight House
	Sackville Street				Sackville Street Building including the Godlee Observatory
	Spring Gardens			Former centre of North West Banking Industry	Former National Westminster Bank
	St John Street		1770–1830 (probable)	Georgian-era street noted for its intact late 18th and early 19th‑century townhouses, many of which are listed	
	Whitworth Street		1899		The Haçienda, Sackville Street Building including the Godlee Observatory
	Wilmslow Road		18th century	Forms the Wilmslow Road bus corridor, reputed to be the busiest in Europe	
