= Manchester Town Hall =

Municipal building in Manchester, England

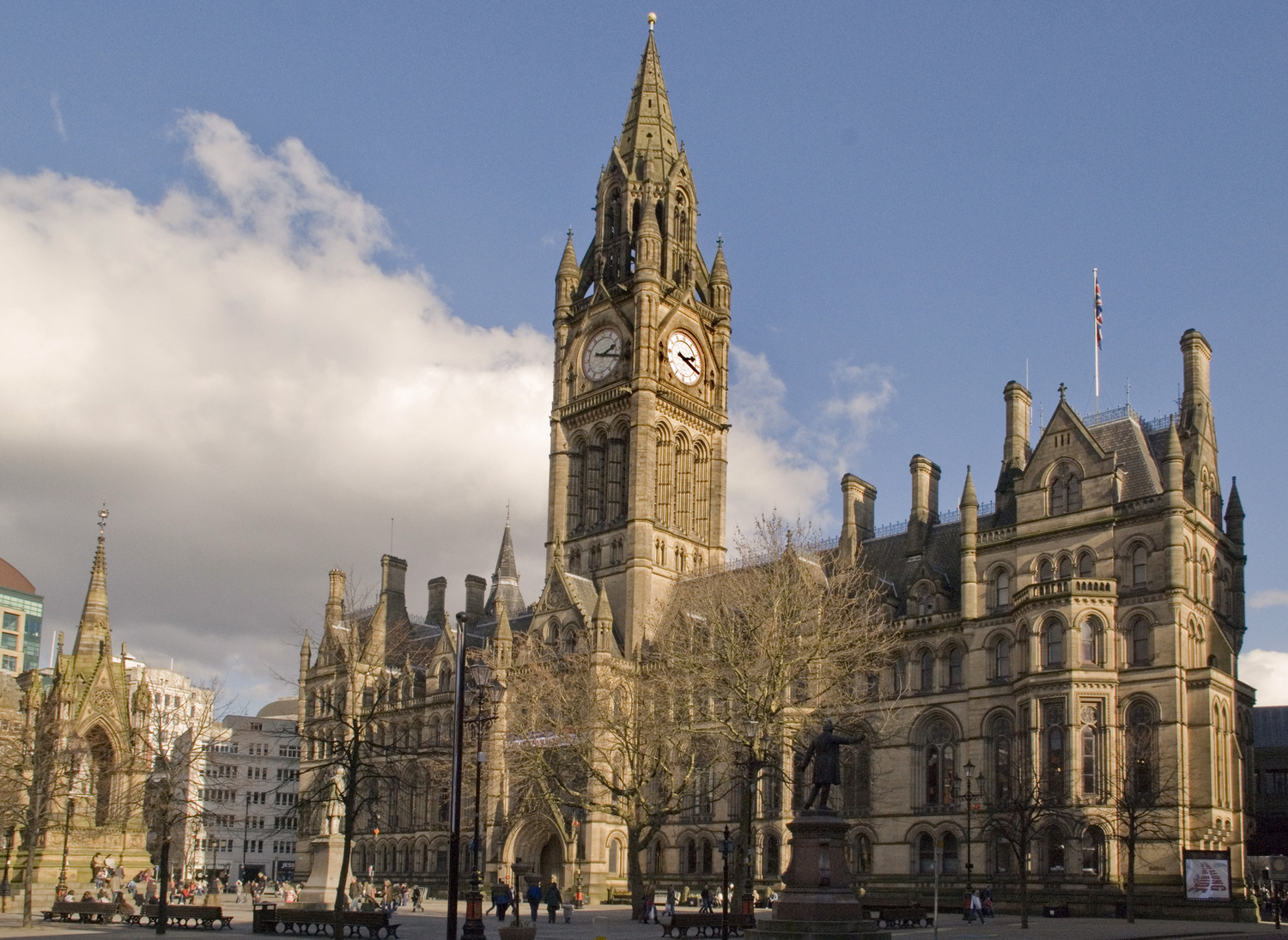

- Location within Greater Manchester

General information
- Type: Town hall
- Architectural style: Gothic Revival/High Victorian Gothic
- Classification

Listed Building – Grade I
- Designated: 25 February 1952
- Reference no.: 1207469
- Location: Manchester, England, Town Hall; Albert Square; Manchester; M2 5DB
- Coordinates: 53°28′45″N 2°14′39″W
- Construction started: 1868
- Completed: 1877
- Inaugurated: 13 September 1877
- Cost: £775,000 – £1 million (£79,760,000 to 102,910,000 as of 2025)
- Owner: Manchester City Council

Height
- Height: Clock tower – 280 feet (85 m)

Technical details
- Floor count: 6

Design and construction
- Architect: Alfred Waterhouse

Manchester Town Hall is a Victorian, neo-Gothic municipal building in Manchester, England. It is the ceremonial headquarters of Manchester City Council and houses a number of local government departments. The building faces Albert Square to the north and St Peter's Square to the south, with Manchester Cenotaph facing its southern entrance.

Designed by architect Alfred Waterhouse, the town hall was completed in 1877. The building contains offices and grand ceremonial rooms such as the Great Hall which is decorated with Ford Madox Brown's imposing Manchester Murals illustrating the history of the city. The entrance and Sculpture Hall contain busts and statues of influential figures including Dalton, Joule and Barbirolli. The exterior is dominated by the clock tower which rises to 280 feet (85 m) and houses Great Abel, the clock bell.

In 1938, a detached Town Hall Extension was completed and is connected by two covered bridges over Lloyd Street. The town hall was designated as a Grade I listed building on 25 February 1952. Both the building and the adjacent Albert Square have been closed since 2018 for refurbishment and are scheduled to be reopened in Spring 2027.

== History ==
=== Old Town Hall ===
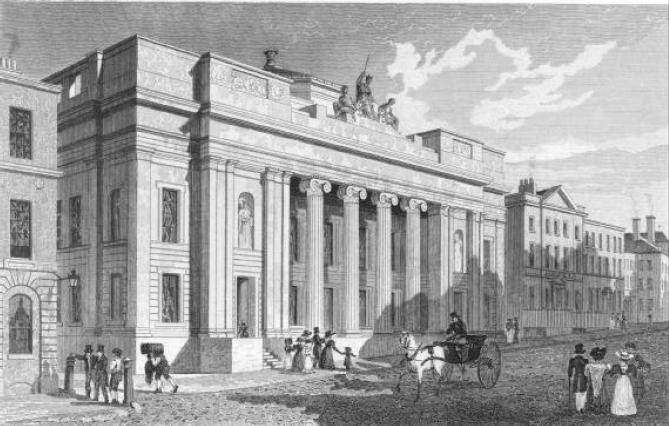
The original Manchester Town Hall

Manchester's original civic administration was housed in the Police Office in King Street. It was replaced by the first Town Hall, to accommodate the growing local government and its civic assembly rooms. The Town Hall, also located in King Street at the corner of Cross Street, was designed by Francis Goodwin and constructed between 1822 and 1825, much of it by David Bellhouse. The building was designed with a screen of Ionic columns across a recessed centre, in a classicising manner strongly influenced by John Soane. The building was 134 feet (41 m) long and 76 feet (23 m) deep, the ground floor housed committee rooms and offices for the Chief Constable, Surveyor, Treasurer, other officers and clerks. The first floor held the Assembly Rooms. The building and land cost £39,587.

As the size and wealth of the city grew, largely as a result of the textile industry, its administration outstripped the existing facilities, and a new building was proposed. The King Street building was subsequently occupied by a lending library and then Lloyds Bank. The façade was removed to Heaton Park in 1912, when a bank, 53 King Street was erected on the site.

=== New Town Hall ===
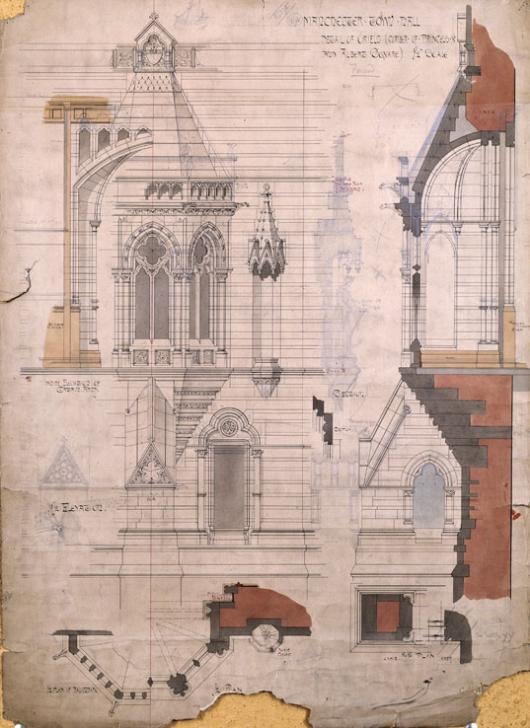
Detail of façades by Alfred Waterhouse

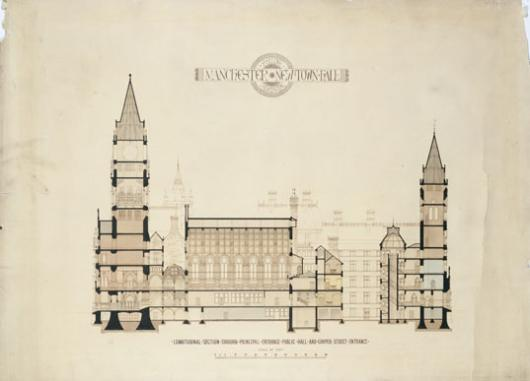
Cross section drawing by Waterhouse

Planning for the new town hall began in 1863. Manchester Corporation demanded it be, 'equal if not superior, to any similar building in the country at any cost which may be reasonably required'. The choice of location was influenced by a desire to provide a central, accessible, but relatively quiet site in a respectable district, close to Manchester's banks and municipal offices, next to a large open area, suitable for the display of a fine building. After investigating suitable sites, including Piccadilly, an oddly shaped plot facing Albert Square was chosen. The Albert Square frontage measures 323 feet (98 m), Lloyd Street is 350 feet (107 m), Princess Street the longest at 383 feet (117 m) and Cooper Street measures 94 feet (29 m). On this tight site, the corporation built a grand hall, a suite of reception rooms, quarters for the lord mayor, offices and a council chamber.

The second stage of a competition to design the town hall which attracted 137 entries was judged by Thomas Leverton Donaldson, a classicist, and gothicist George Edmund Street. The eight finalists were Waterhouse, William Lee, Speakman & Charlesworth, Cuthbert Brodrick, Thomas Worthington, John Oldrid Scott, Thomas Henry Wyatt and Edward Salomons. In terms of design and aesthetics, Waterhouse's proposal was placed fourth behind those of Speakman & Charlesworth, Oldrid Scott and Worthington but his design was considered far superior in architectural quality, layout and use of light and he was appointed architect on 1 April 1868.

The foundation stone was laid on 26 October 1868 by the Mayor, Robert Neill. Construction took nine years and used 14 million bricks. Estimates for the cost of construction vary from £775,000 to around £1 million, translating to between £79,760,000 and £102,910,000 in 2025. When Queen Victoria refused to attend, Manchester Town Hall was opened on 13 September 1877 by the mayor, Abel Heywood, who had championed the project.

=== Town Hall Extension ===
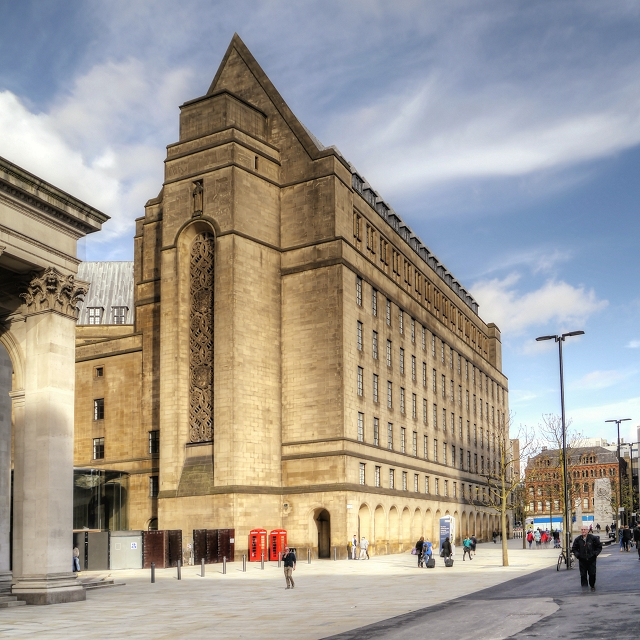
The Town Hall Extension to the west of the Town Hall, designed by E. Vincent Harris and completed in 1934

In 1927, a competition to design the Town Hall Extension was won by Emanuel Vincent Harris, the architect who also won a competition to design the city's Central Library. Work began on the extension in 1934 and was completed by 1938. Charles Herbert Reilly, a contemporary architecture critic, thought the extension was 'dull' and 'drab' while Nikolaus Pevsner considered it was Harris's best work. It is linked to the town hall by glazed pedestrian bridges at first-floor level.

=== 21st-century refurbishment ===
By late 2014, the Town Hall was being described as "being in urgent need of essential repair" and modernisation. In a 2014 report, Manchester City Council highlighted the need to replace the building's heating and electrical systems, refurbish windows and high-level stonework and repair parts of the roofing. Over 500 timber windows will be restored as part of this renovation project. The building temporarily closed to visitors in 2018 to undergo a £524.8 million renovation project. The refurbishment has been both over-budget and late, with the building now scheduled to be re-opened in spring 2027.

== Architecture ==
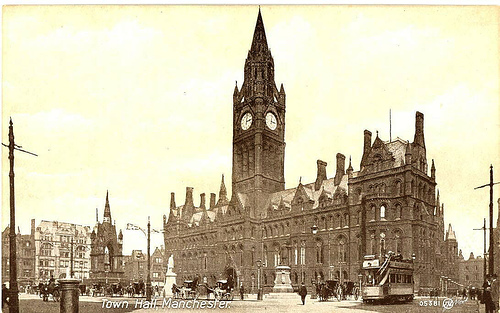
The town hall in the early 20th century, its stonework blackened by air pollution

The rapid growth and accompanying pollution in Victorian cities caused great problems for architects including denial of light, overcrowding, awkward sites, noise, accessibility and visibility of buildings, and air pollution. Provision for "the sufficiency of window light supplied throughout the building" was addressed by the use of architectural devices: suspended first floor rooms, made possible by the use of iron-framed construction, skylights, extra windows and dormers, "borrowed lights" for interior spaces and glazed white bricks in conjunction with mosaic marble paving in areas where the light was "less strong". Clear glass was used in important rooms, with light-coloured tints for coloured glazing, as "the sky of Manchester does not favour the employment of deeply stained glass."

The building exemplifies the Victorian Gothic revival style of architecture, using themes and elements from 13th-century Early English Gothic architecture. Gothic features most prominent in the Manchester Town Hall are low rib vault ceilings and tall arched windows. The choice of the Gothic was influenced by the wish for a spiritual acknowledgement of Manchester's late medieval heritage in the textile trade of the Hanseatic league and an affirmation of modernity in the fashionable neo-Gothic style favoured over the Neoclassical architecture of Liverpool.

Despite its medieval styling, the building was designed to support the practical technologies of the 19th century. It had gas lighting, and a warm-air heating system, which provided fresh air drawn through ornamental stone air inlets below the windows and admitted behind the hot water pipes and 'coils' into the rooms. Warmed, fresh air was fed into the stairwells and through hollow shafts within the spiral staircases to ventilate the corridors. Pipes supplying gas for lighting were ingeniously concealed underneath the banister rails of the spiral staircases. Waterhouse designed the building structure to be fireproof, using a combination of concrete and wrought-iron beams.

=== Exterior ===
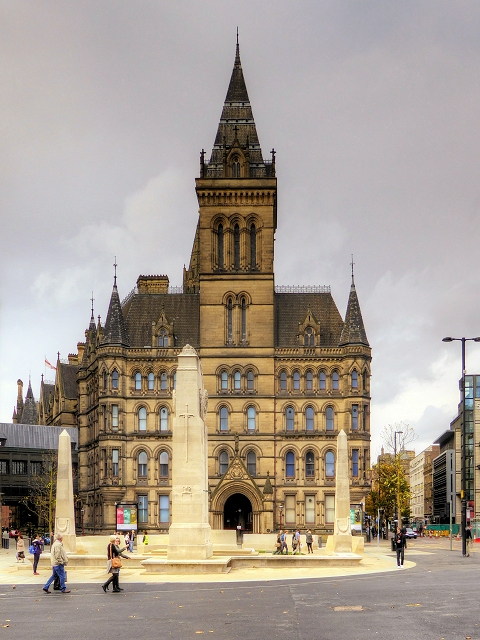
The east façade from Mosley Street with Lutyen's relocated Cenotaph in the foreground

In mid-19th-century Manchester, many important Georgian buildings were blackened by atmospheric pollution. By the 1870s the local soft red Collyhurst sandstone was deemed to be unsuitable for public buildings, and tough Pennine sandstones were preferred. The architectural competition entries were judged in part on their suitability for the "climate of the district", and sample stone types were investigated. Waterhouse believed it was a matter of great difficulty to find a stone "proof against the evil influences of the peculiar climate of Manchester" but decided that the Bradford Dale-quarried Spinkwell Stone and Bolton Woods Stone/Gaisby Rock/Elland Flags stone would resist "the deleterious influences of Manchester atmosphere". The interior decoration was chosen with a view to providing permanent colour and cleanable surfaces. Public corridors were faced with terracotta rather than plaster, and extensive use was made of stone vaulted ceilings, tiled dados and washable mosaic floors.

Waterhouse's design used a Gothic style with limited carved decoration and a uniform colour, a departure from the high Victorian heaviness and colour used in contemporary Ruskinian Gothic buildings, and was criticised by some Manchester inhabitants for not being Gothic enough. The decision to spend large amounts of money on a building "when most of its architectural effect would be lost because ruined by soot and made nearly invisible by smoke" was criticised. Waterhouse avoided using a polychrome scheme as seen in High Victorian Gothic buildings such as St Pancras railway station believing it to be impractical as Manchester's industrial atmosphere would quickly ruin the effect and decided a uniform stone exterior was the better solution. Statues of notable figures in the city's history decorate its exterior, that of Agricola, founder of the Roman fort is over the main door and over its gable is a statue of St George. Statues of Thomas Grelley, first lord of the manor, Humphrey Chetham and Thomas de la Warre are among six at the corner of Albert Square and Princess Street. Waterhouse's design proved successful and although its exterior was blackened by the late 1890s, the stonework was in a suitable condition to be cleaned and restored to its original appearance in the late 1960s.

=== Clock tower ===
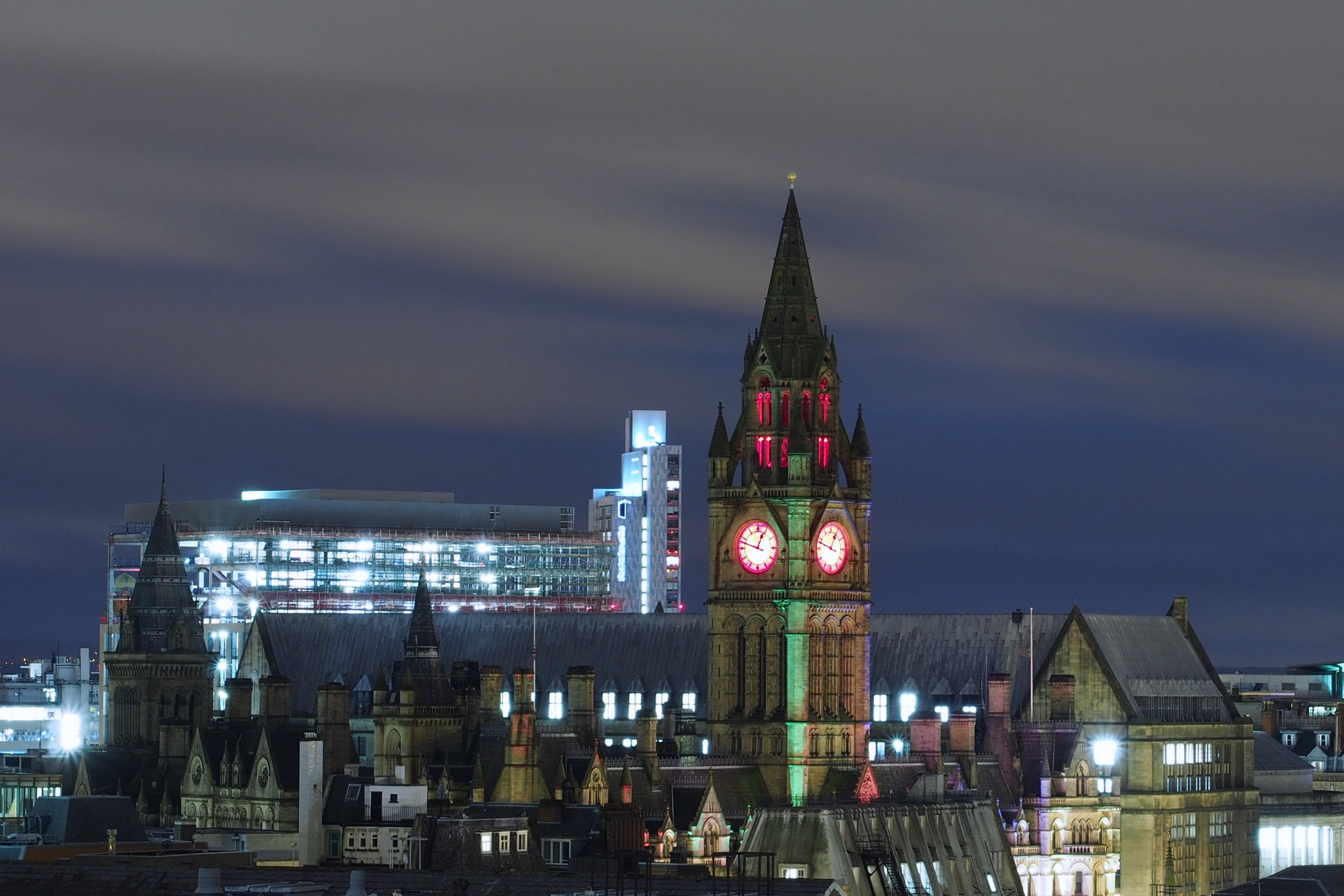
View across the rooftops by night, from the north-west

The 280 feet (85 m) tall bell tower, the 19th tallest building in Manchester as of February 2023, houses a carillon of 23 bells: 12 are hung for full circle change ringing and were manufactured by John Taylor Bellfounders.

The largest bell or bourdon, Great Abel, named after Abel Heywood, weighs 8 tons 2.5 cwt is hung dead and only strikes the hours alongside four of the 12 ringing bells which are used for the Westminster Clock Chime. Its clock, made by Gillett and Bland (predecessor of Gillett and Johnston), was originally wound using hydraulic power supplied by Manchester Hydraulic Power. Great Abel first rang on New Year's Day 1879, but cracked, was replaced in 1882, and then recast with all the bells in 1937. Great Abel is also inscribed with the initials AH for Abel Heywood and the line Ring out the false, ring in the true from Tennyson's "Ring Out, Wild Bells".

As of 2026, change ringing is not permitted while the building is being restored.

=== Interior ===
Waterhouse's plan for the town hall bridged the gap between office and ceremonial requirements and maximised space on its triangular site. His design for a six-storey building filled the asymmetrical site. Set around its perimeter is a cloister of corridors linking offices and everyday workings. Its grandiose, ceremonial features are centrally located. By the main entrance on Albert Square are two grand staircases leading to the landing outside its Great Hall. The stairs have low risers allowing access for women in Victorian dress. The walls of the staircases have tall, arched windows admitting daylight. Three spiral staircases accessing the first floor from entrances on Princess Street, Lloyd Street and Cooper Street are constructed in English, Scottish and Irish granite.

==== Sculpture Hall ====
The ground-floor Sculpture Hall contains statues and busts of people who made significant contributions to Manchester, the Anti-Corn Law campaigners, Richard Cobden and John Bright, and scientists John Dalton and James Joule among many others. The room measures 53 feet by 33 feet and has a groin vaulted ceiling, constructed out of Bath stone. The Sculpture Hall Café is now located here.

==== Great Hall ====
The landing has a glazed skylight on which the names of mayors, lord mayors and chairs of the council since Manchester received its Charter of Corporation in 1838 are inscribed on glass panes. The landing has a mosaic floor with a pattern of bees and cotton flowers, both symbols of Manchester. Influential Victorian critic John Ruskin described the Great Hall as "The most truly magnificent Gothic apartment in Europe."

The rectangular hall measures 100 feet (30 m) by 50 feet (15 m). Natural light permeates from seven high windows on either side of the hall from the courtyards outside. It has a wagon roof, its ceiling divided into panels bearing the arms of countries and towns with which Manchester traded at the zenith of its mercantile power. The Manchester Murals by Ford Madox Brown, a sequence of 12 paintings depicting the history of Manchester decorate its walls. They are not true frescoes but use the Gambier Parry process.

The organ installed by Aristide Cavaillé-Coll in 1877 stands 16 feet (5 m) tall and had more than 5,000 pipes, five manuals and 65 speaking stops. Cavaillé-Coll cleaned it and added the solo organ in 1893. In 1912, T.C. Lewis of Brixton rebuilt it and added the echo division. Jardine of Manchester's minor rebuild in 1970 added the mobile five-manual console.

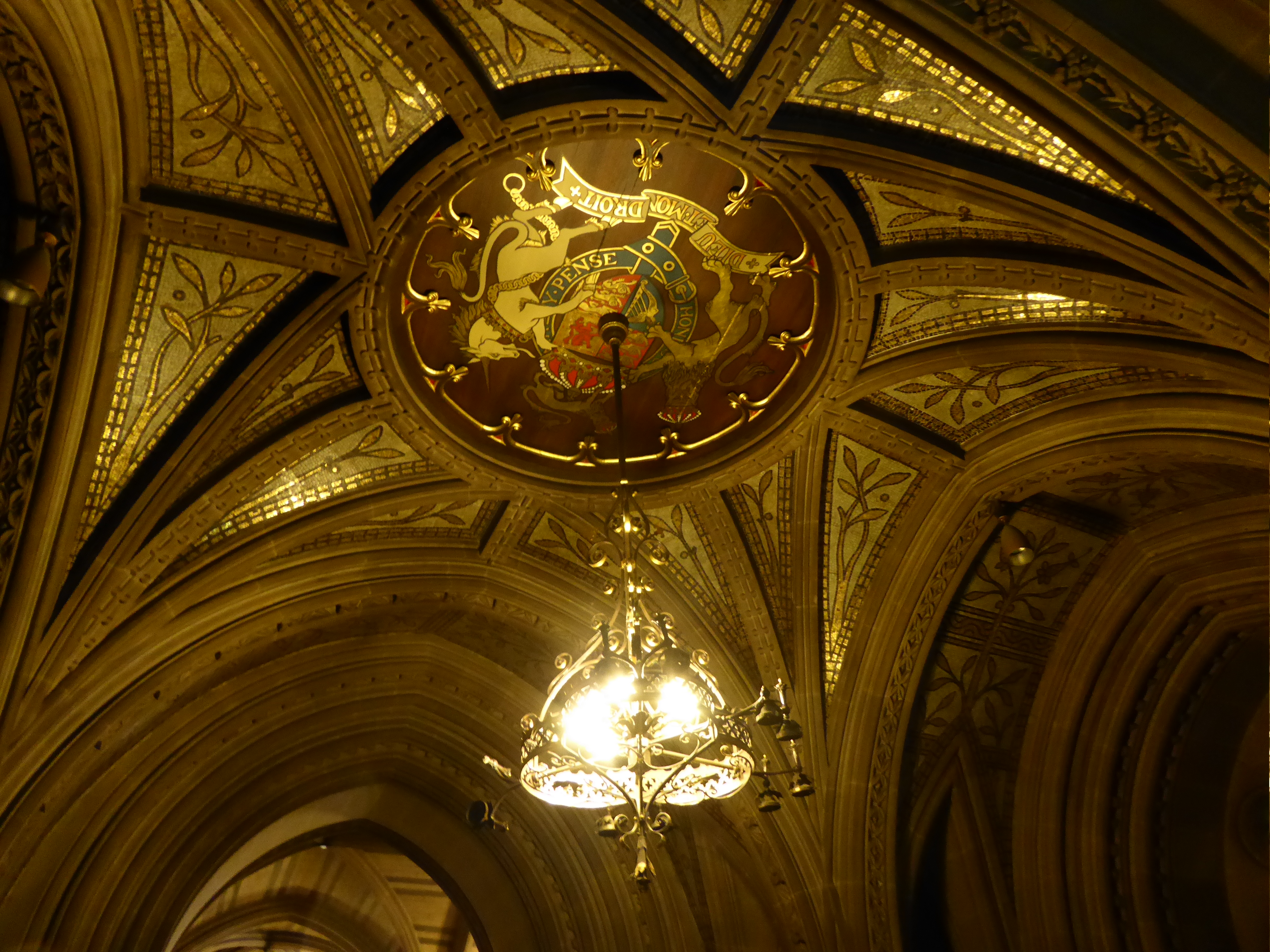
Entrance Vestibule

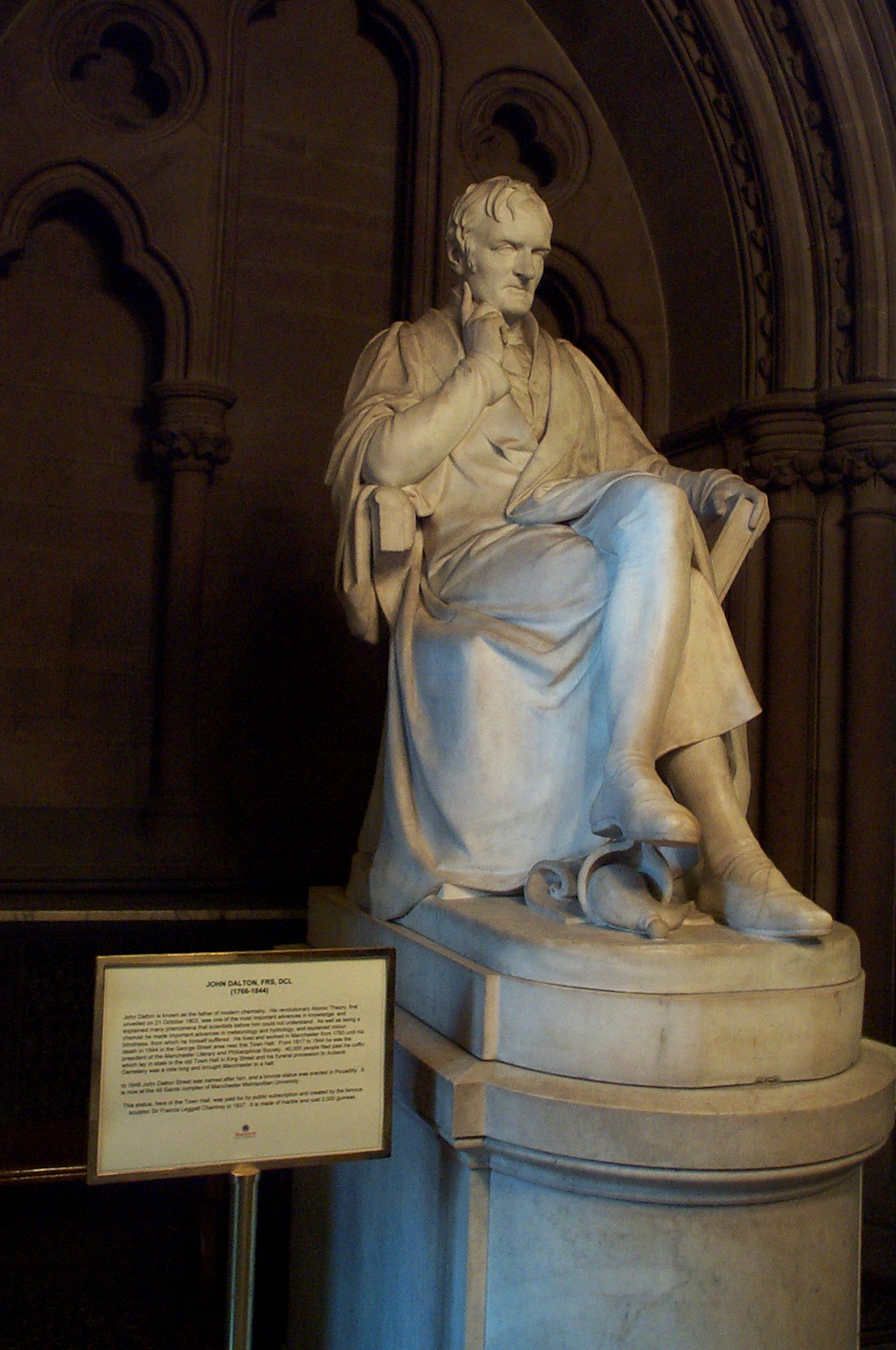
Statue of John Dalton in entrance vestibule, sculpted 1837 by Francis Leggatt Chantrey

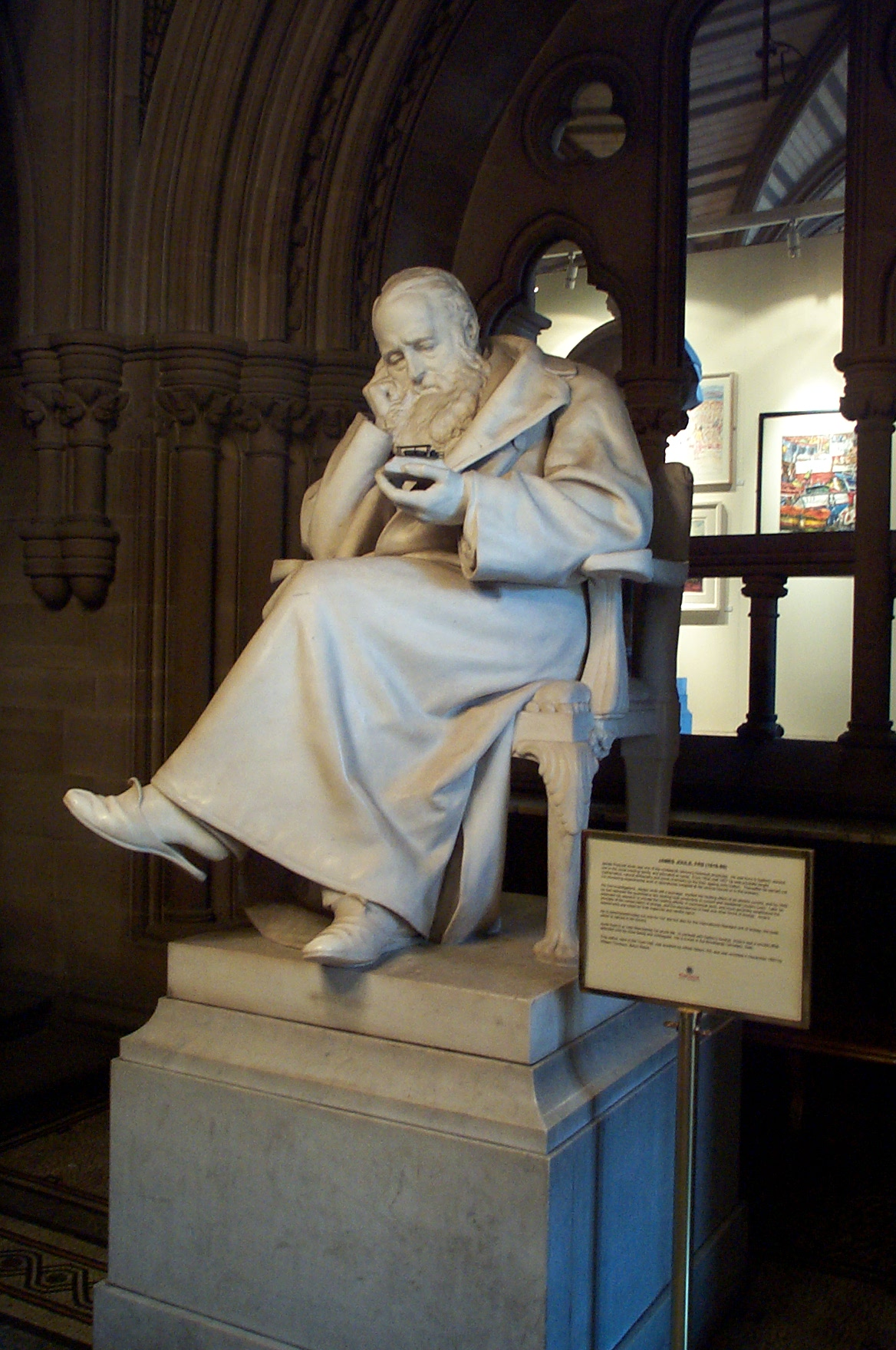
Statue of James Prescott Joule in entrance vestibule, sculpted 1893 by Alfred Gilbert

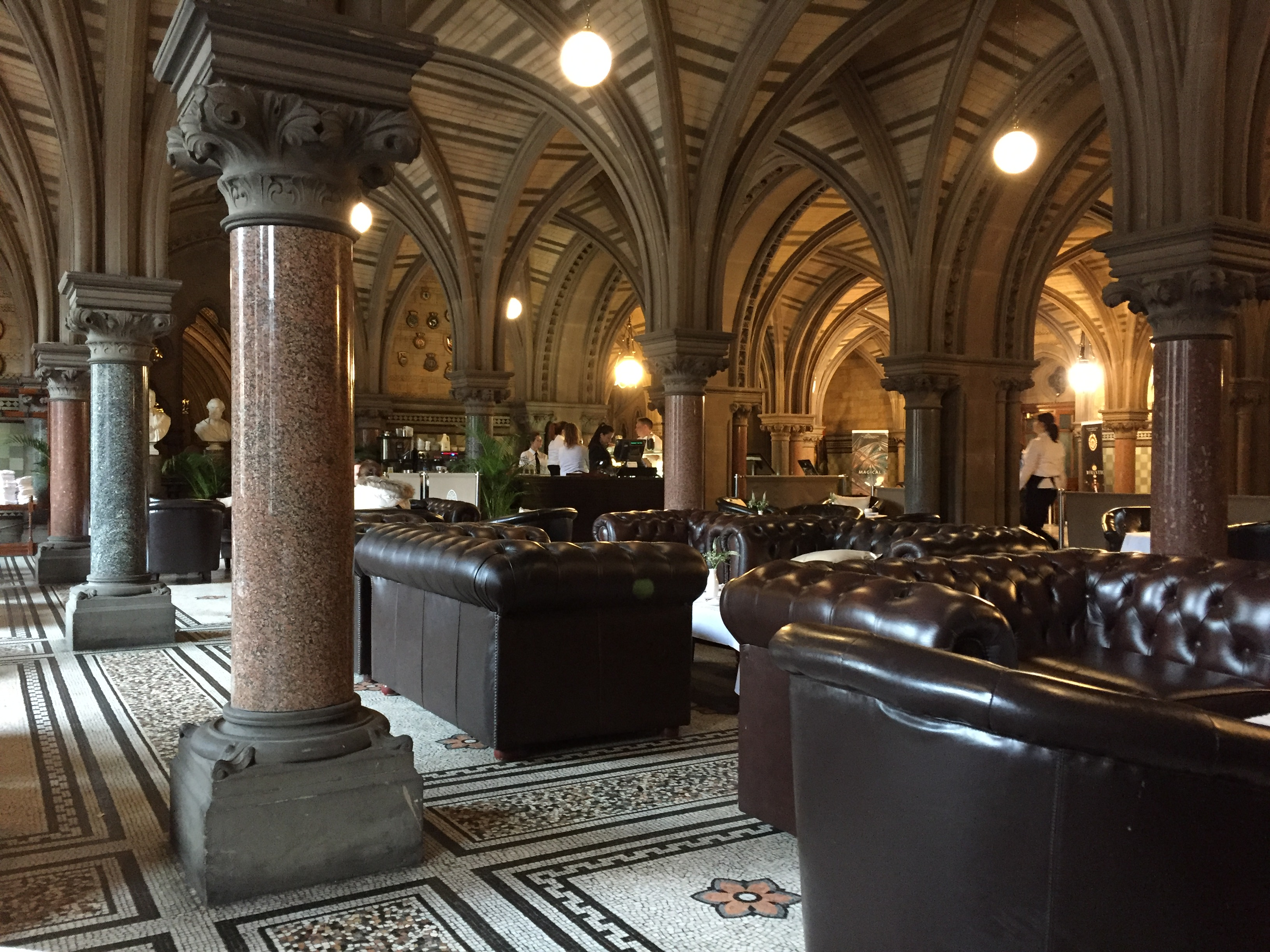
The Entrance Hall

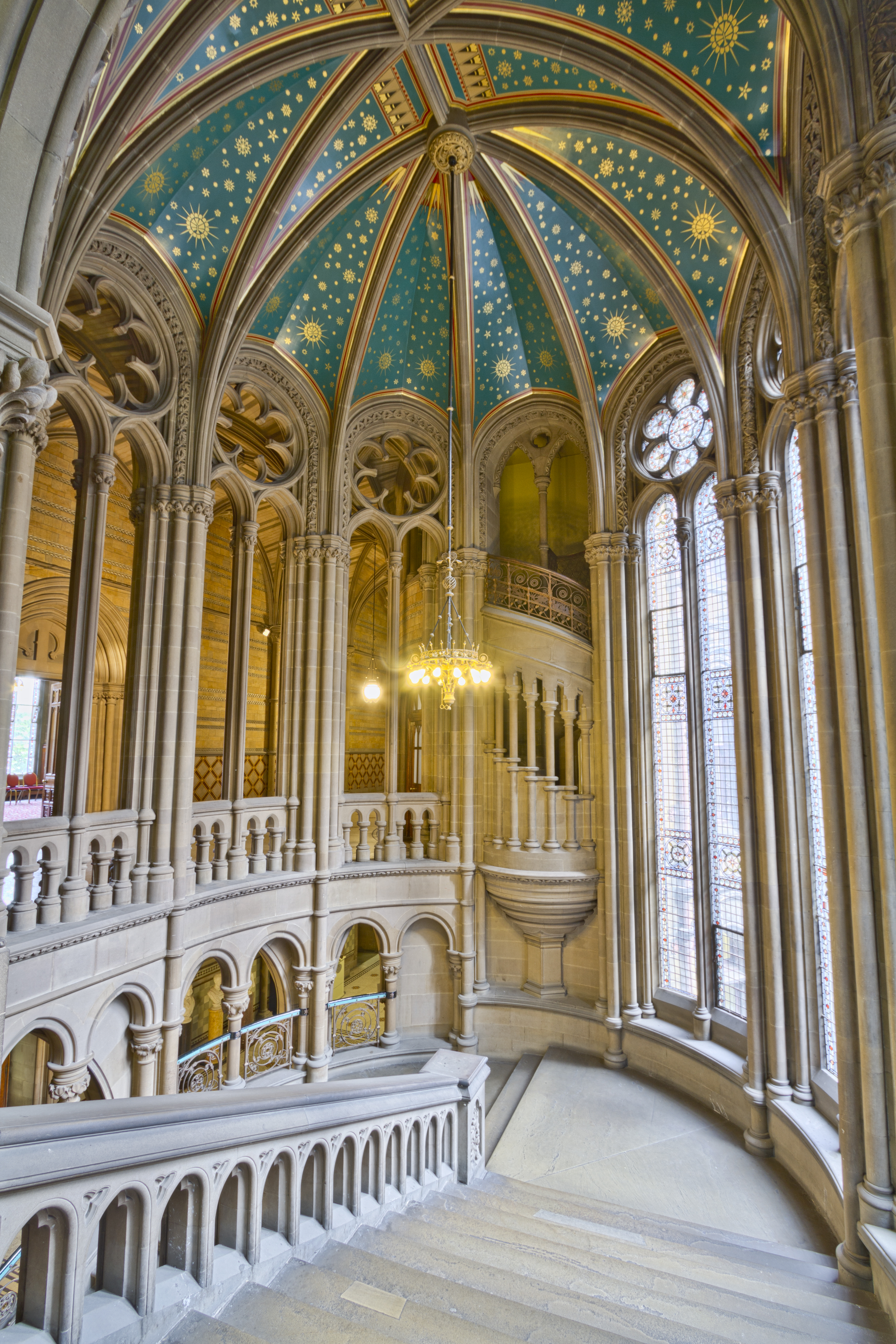
The principal staircase with a spiral staircase projecting into it

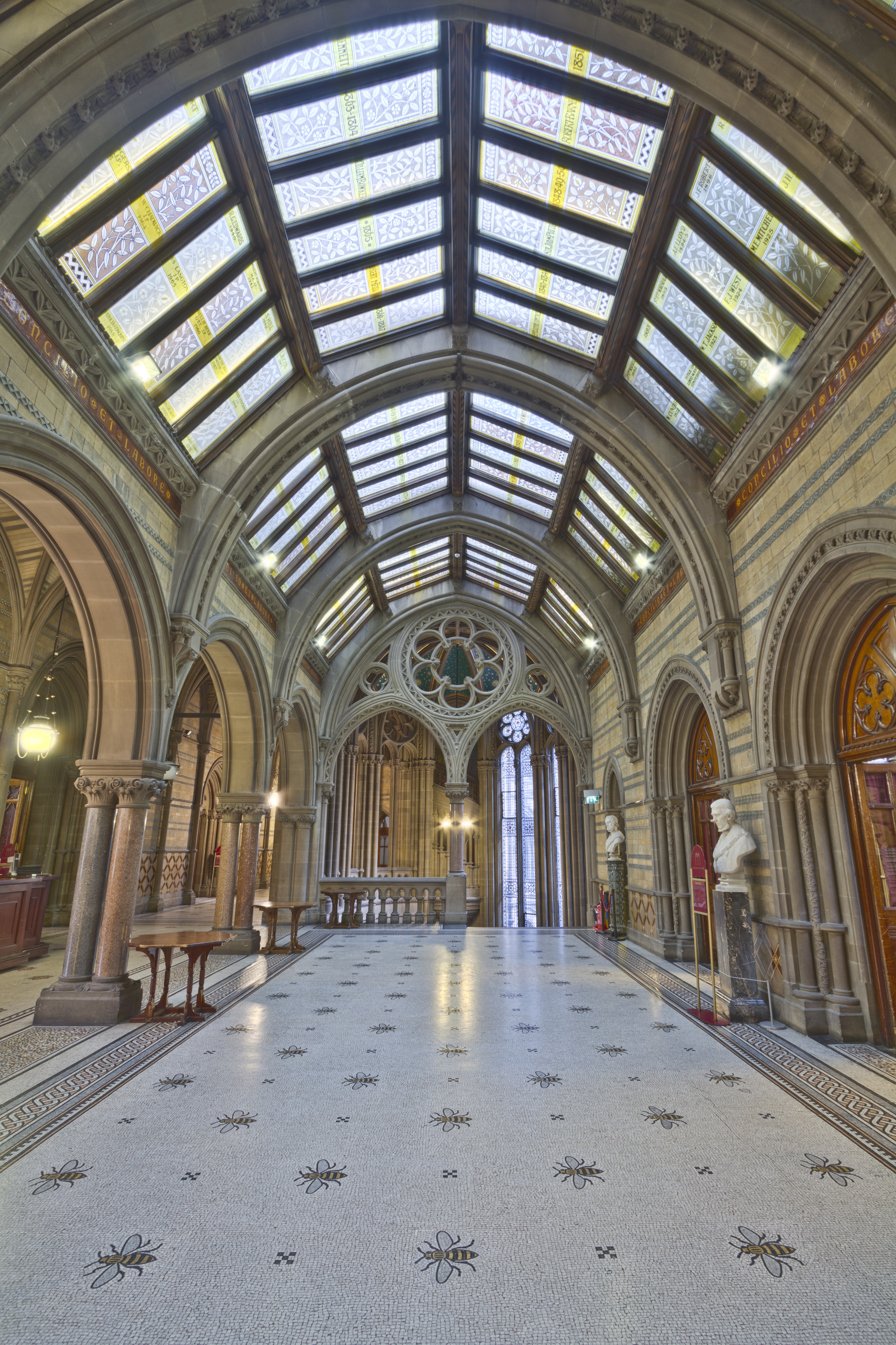
The landing outside the Great Hall

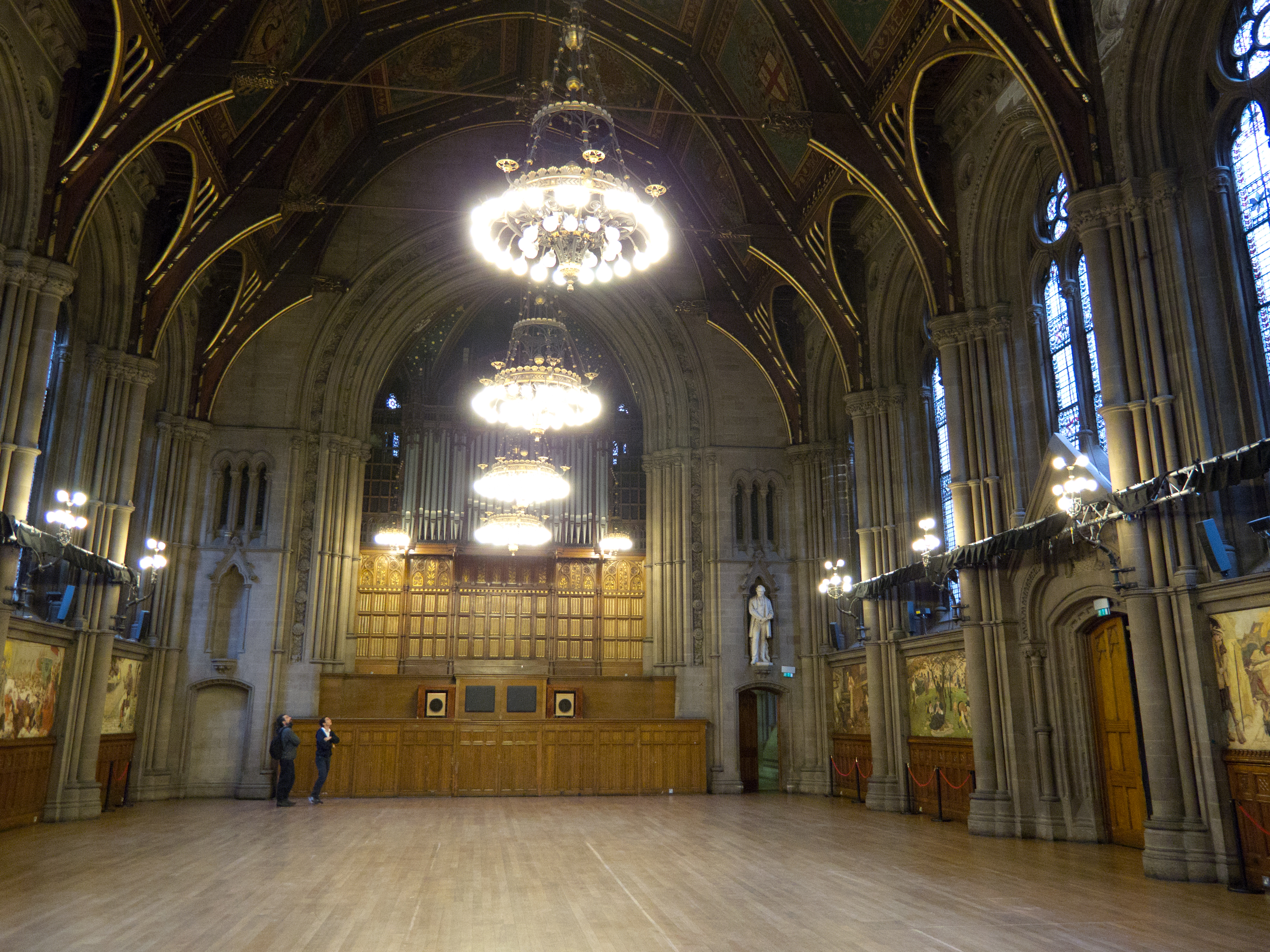
The Great Hall, its walls decorated with The Manchester Murals

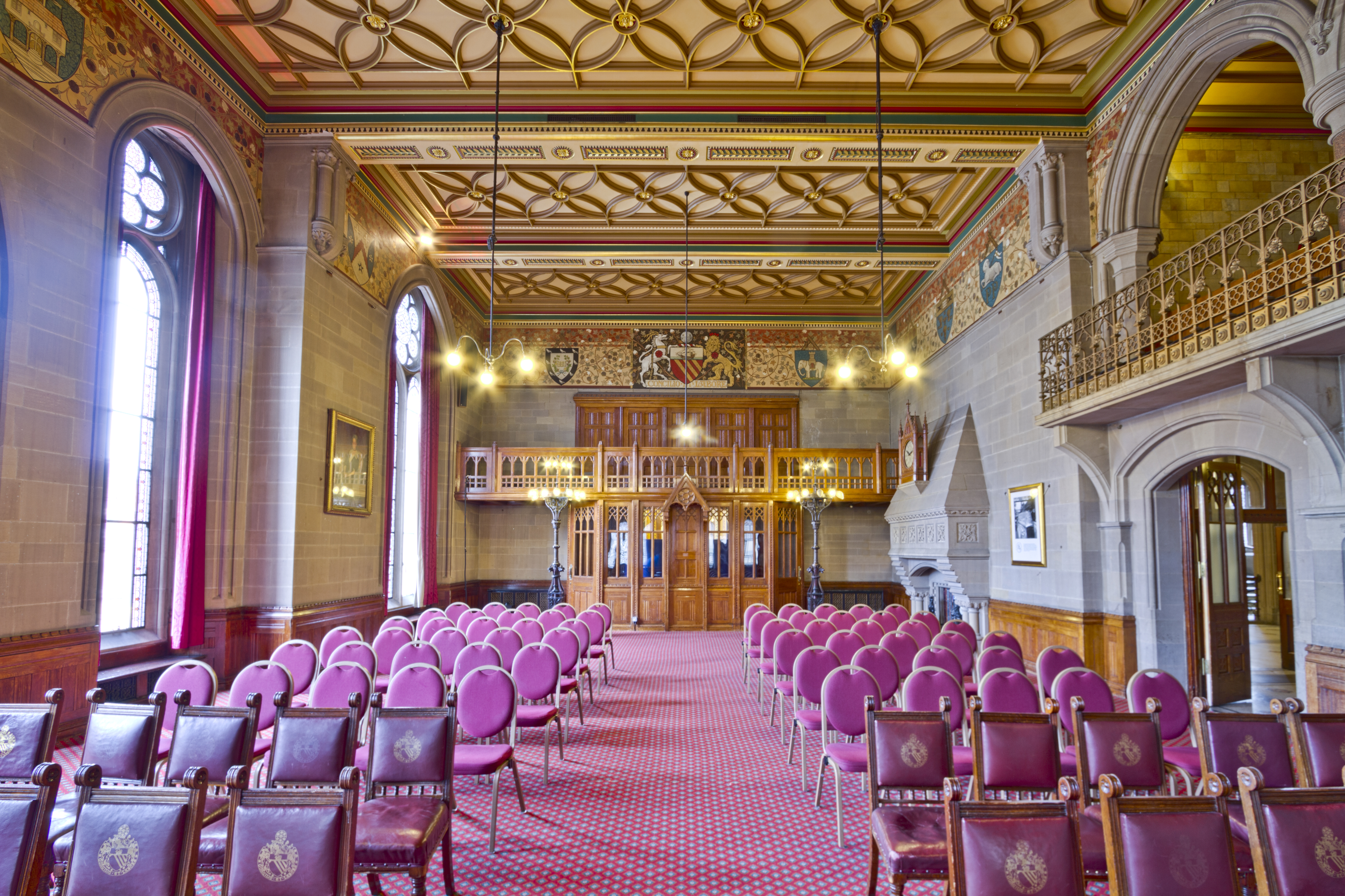
Conference Hall, originally the Council Chamber

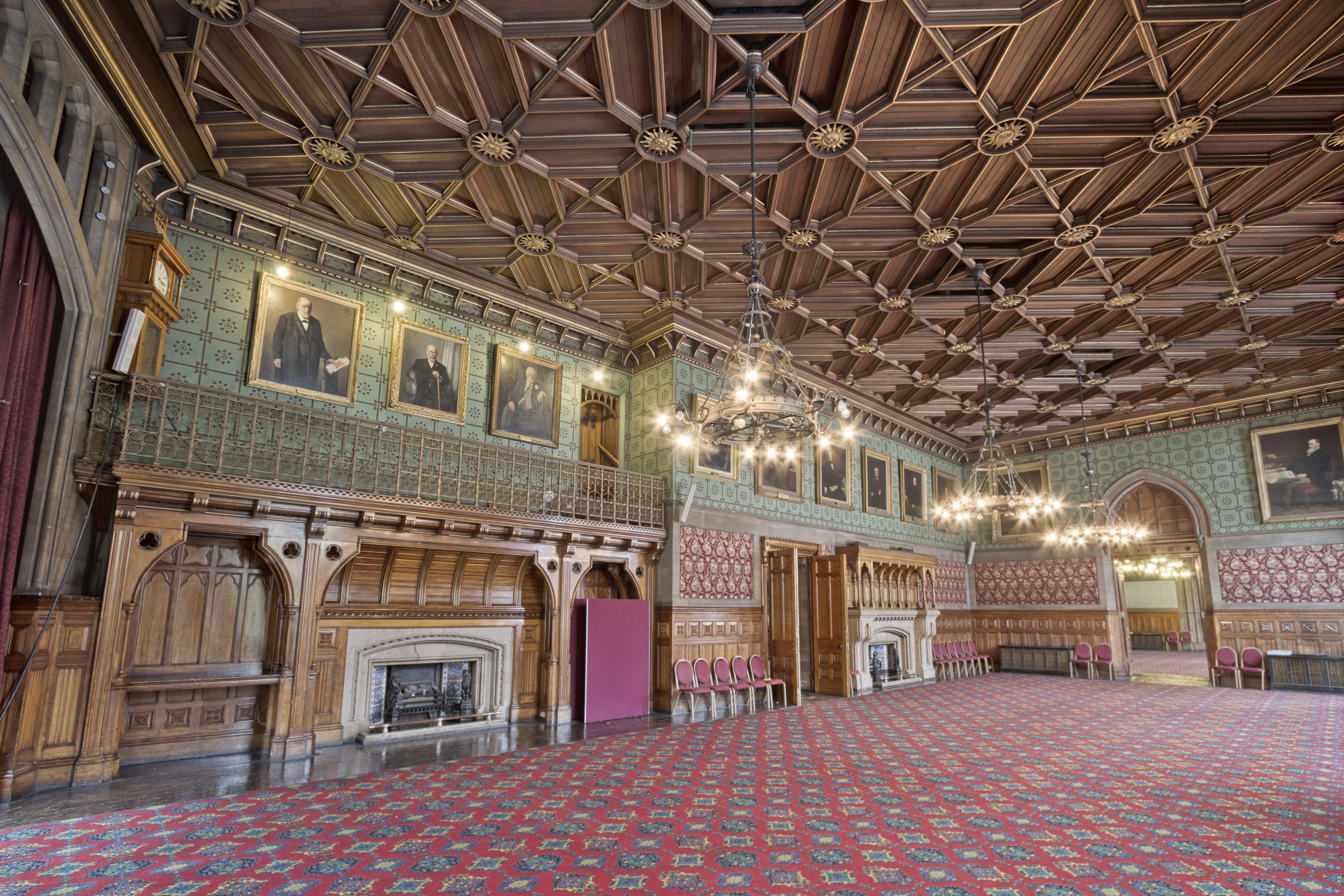
Banqueting Room

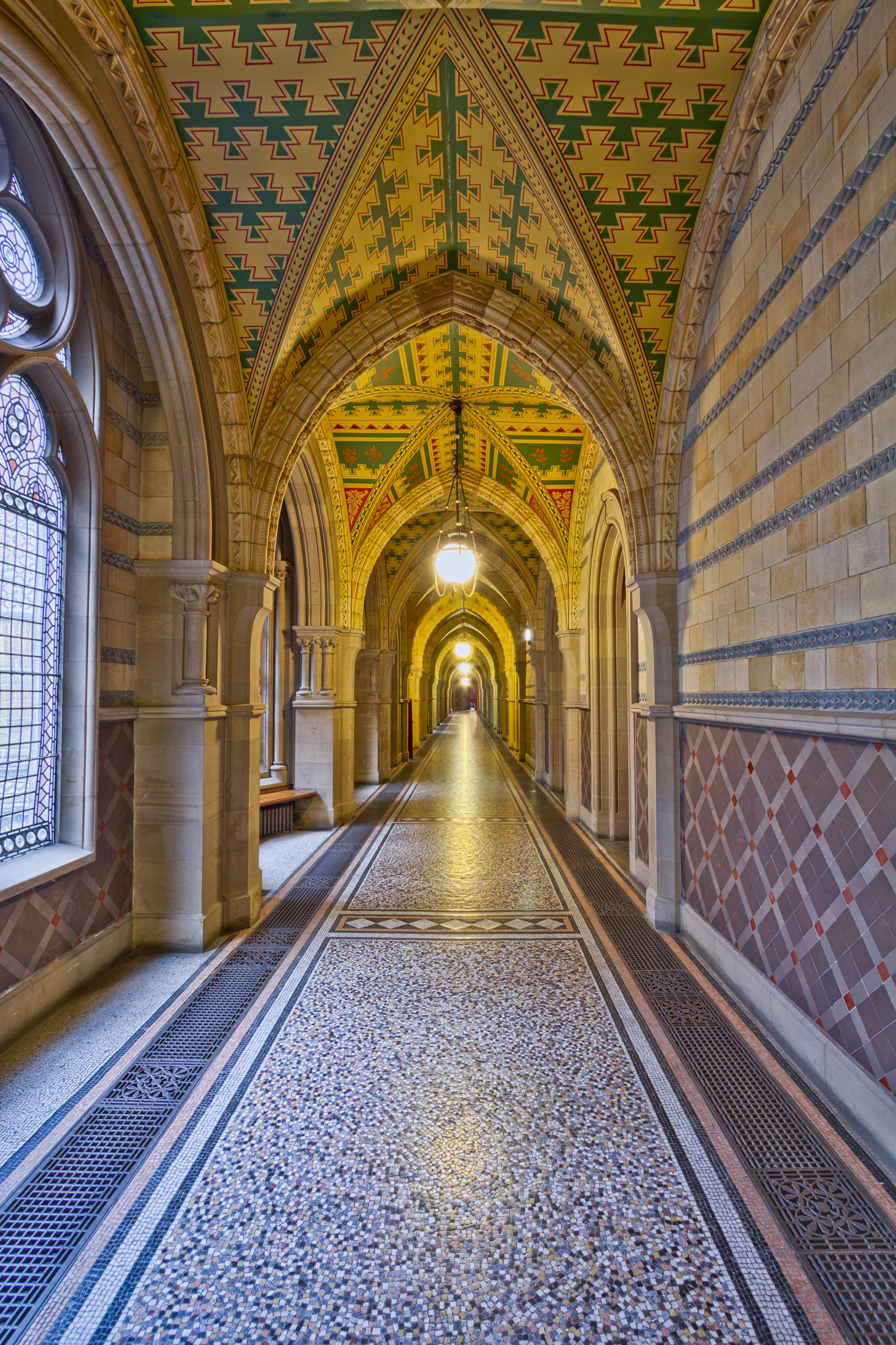
Corridor

=== Reception ===
The town hall is a Grade I listed building, one of fifteen Grade I listed buildings in Manchester; it is regarded as one of the finest interpretations of Gothic revival architecture in the world.

F. A. Bruton wrote that "The Town Hall ... is best viewed when the Square is empty and silent, as, for example, on Saturday afternoon or Sunday, and it is then that we may realise what a splendid "ruin" it will make, to excite the wonder of the South Sea Islander of the future".

James Stevens Curl described it as "a High-Victorian Gothic secular masterpiece that combines eclectic elements to form a style that can only be Victorian". It was voted Greater Manchester's favourite building by readers of the Manchester Evening News in 2012, and in the same year featured in a series of Royal Mail stamps commemorating British landmarks.

== Current use ==
Council meetings are no longer regularly held in the town hall, but in the Town Hall Extension. The hall now has a number of other uses. It is licensed for weddings and civil partnerships and is available to hire for conferences and other events. Tours of the clock tower are available through external tour companies at a cost.

As the town hall bears some resemblance to the Palace of Westminster, it has been used as a location for television and films. The original version of the political thriller House of Cards (1990) and the 2003 BBC drama series State of Play both used the town hall to represent Westminster. The films Ali G Indahouse (2001), Sherlock Holmes (2008), The Iron Lady (2011), Victor Frankenstein (2014), and A Very English Scandal (2018) also all used the town hall as a stand-in for the interiors of the Palace of Westminster.

In 2014, a 24-hour police station reopened in the town hall, having been closed since 1937. Unlike the original, the new station does not include custody cells, but officers are able to conduct interviews there. Chief Superintendent Nick Adderley described the location as "perfectly placed in the hub of the city" and suitable to "serve the needs of the public 24 hours a day".

Overnight on 23 June and into 24 June 2016, the venue was used to announce the official result of the EU Referendum by the chair of the Electoral Commission acting as Chief Counting Officer (CSO) Jenny Watson.

== See also ==
- Grade I listed buildings in Greater Manchester
- Listed buildings in Manchester-M2
- Manchester Murals
- Manchester Town Hall Extension
- Rochdale Town Hall
