= Charles Henry Heathcote =

British architect (1850–1938)

Charles Heathcote
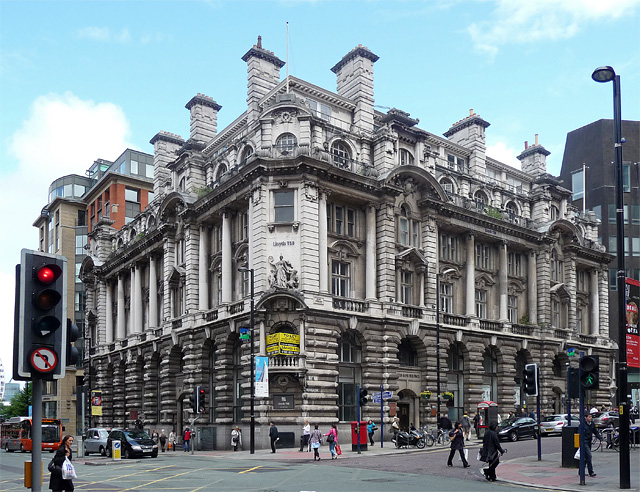
- Lloyds Bank, Manchester
- Born: Charles Henry Heathcote; 2 April 1850; Manchester, England
- Died: 16 January 1938 (aged 87); Bournemouth, England
- Occupation: Architect
- Buildings: 107 Piccadilly (1899), Piccadilly; Parr's Bank (1902), York Street; Eagle Star Building (1911), Cross Street; Lloyds Bank (1915), King Street
- Projects: Trafford Park, Trafford

Charles Henry Heathcote (2 April 1850 – 16 January 1938) was a British architect who practised in Manchester. He was articled to the church architects Charles Hansom, of Clifton, Bristol. He was awarded the RI Medal of Merit in 1868, and started his own practice in 1872.

Heathcote built city centre buildings such as Parr's Bank (1902) on York Street, the Eagle Star Building (1911) on Cross Street, Lloyds Bank (1915) on King Street, and the earlier 107 Piccadilly textile warehouse (1899). He helped plan the Trafford Park industrial estate, working for British Westinghouse and the Ford Motor Company. He designed 15 warehouses for the Manchester Ship Canal Company. He also worked on the buildings for Richard Lane's Cheadle Royal Lunatic Asylum.

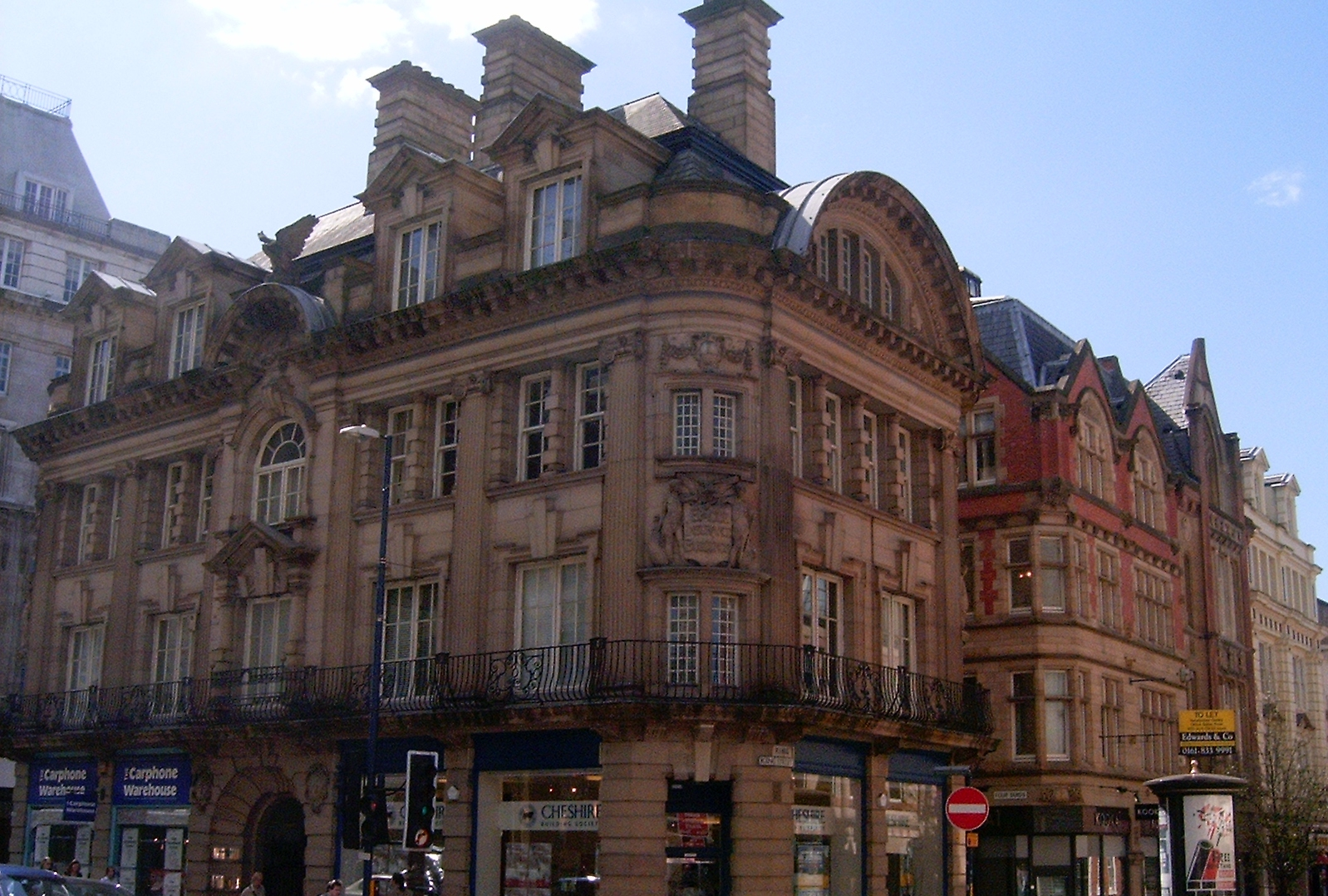
Eagle Insurance Building, Manchester

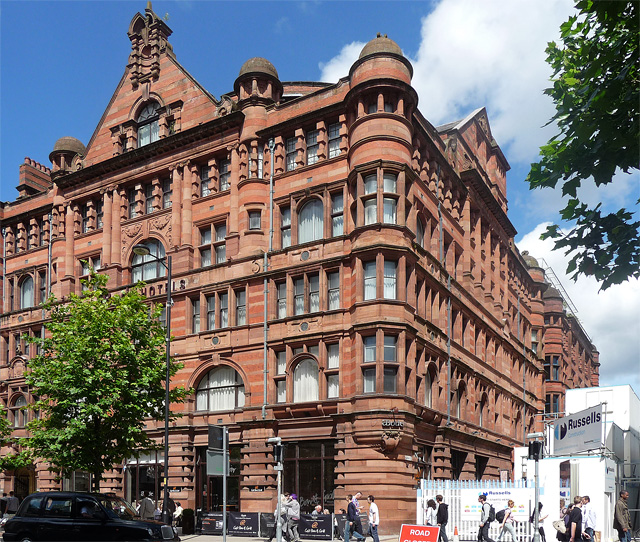
107 Piccadilly

== Buildings ==
Listed buildings at Grade II* and Grade II:

- 53 King Street, Lloyds Bank, 1915 (later Lloyds TSB, now a restaurant)
- Northern Rock Insurance, corner of Cross Street and King Street, 1895
- Eagle Insurance Building, 68 Cross Street, 1911
- Anglia House, 86 Cross Street, 1904
- Royal London House, 188–202 Deansgate, 1904
- Onward Buildings, 205–209 Deansgate, 1903–05
- 107 Piccadilly for Sparrow Hardwick & Company, 1898 (now an Abode Hotel)
- Commercial Union Buildings, 47 Spring Gardens, 1881–82
- 1–3 York Street, corner of Spring Gardens, 1902 (formerly Parr's Bank, Grade II*)
- Joshua Hoyle Building, 50 Piccadilly, 1904

Other

- Dental Hospital, Oxford Road, University of Manchester, 1908
- 7–9 Piccadilly, with W. A. Thomas, 1910 (demolished)

Heathcote & Rawle Grade II listed

- Alliance House, 28–34 Cross Street, 1901
- Lancashire & Yorkshire Bank, 43–45 Spring Gardens, 1890

== See also ==
- Heathcote (surname)
