= 53 King Street =

Listed building in Manchester, England

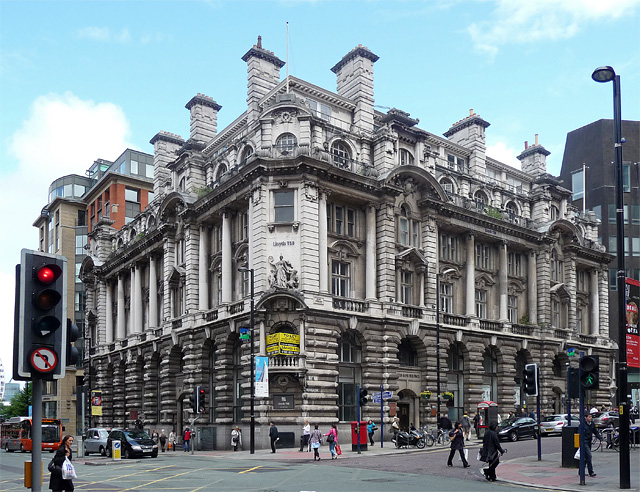
- Interactive map of the 53 King Street area
- Alternative names: Lloyds TSB Building

General information
- Architectural style: Edwardian Baroque
- Location: 53 King Street, Manchester, M2 4LQ
- Coordinates: 53.48125°N 2.24430°W
- Completed: 1913
- Client: Lloyds Bank

Technical details
- Material: Portland stone
- Floor count: 7 (incl. basement and double attic)

Design and construction
- Architect: Charles Henry Heathcote
- Designations

Listed Building – Grade II
- Official name: Former Lloyds Bank
- Designated: 3 October 1974
- Reference no.: 1291610

53 King Street is an Edwardian Baroque bank on King Street in Manchester, England. Designed by architect Charles Henry Heathcote, it opened in 1913 and was granted Grade II listed building status in 1974. It used to house a branch of Lloyds TSB. In 2009 the building was sold for £6 million. The building stands on the site of the old Manchester Town Hall.

== Architecture ==
The bank, designed in an elaborate Baroque style, is built on an L-shaped site with seven bays on King Street and eight bays facing Cross Street and between them a chamfered corner. It is constructed of Portland stone on a granite plinth and has a basement with four storeys above and double attics.

== Current use ==
As of 2023, the site hosts a pizzeria, L'Antica. It was formerly a branch of the Italian food restaurant chain Zizzi.

== See also ==
- Listed buildings in Manchester-M2
