= 107 Piccadilly =

Building in Manchester, England

Coordinates: 53.47981°N 2.23301°W

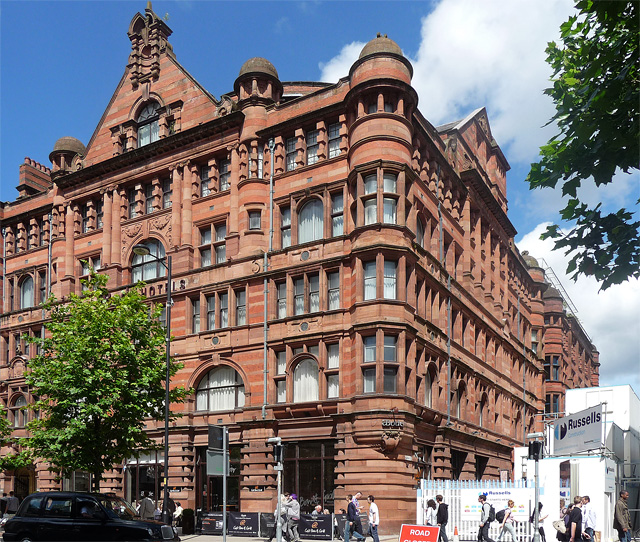
- 107 Piccadilly, Manchester
- Interactive map of the 107 Piccadilly area

General information
- Architectural style: Jacobean-Baroque
- Location: Manchester, M1 2DB
- Completed: 1899

Technical details
- Material: red sandstone and red brick

Design and construction
- Architect: Charles Henry Heathcote
- Designations

Listed Building – Grade II
- Official name: 107, Piccadilly
- Designated: 2 October 1974
- Reference no.: 1246944

107 Piccadilly is a Grade-II listed building on Piccadilly and Lena Street in Manchester, England. Situated near Piccadilly Gardens, it was originally built as a packing warehouse and showroom with offices for cotton manufacturer Sparrow Hardwick & Company.

It was designed by influential Mancunian architect Charles Henry Heathcote in a Jacobean-Baroque style. The building was completed in 1899. The exterior consists of red sandstone and red brick. The five-storey building has a central gable on the front façade reminiscent of Jacobean architecture. The use of arched and square windows give the building a playful appearance. The building gained Grade-II listing in 1974. It has since been converted to an Abode Hotel and restaurant.

== See also ==
- Listed buildings in Manchester-M1
