= King Street, Manchester =

Street in Manchester, England

Coordinates: 53.48118°N 2.24582°W

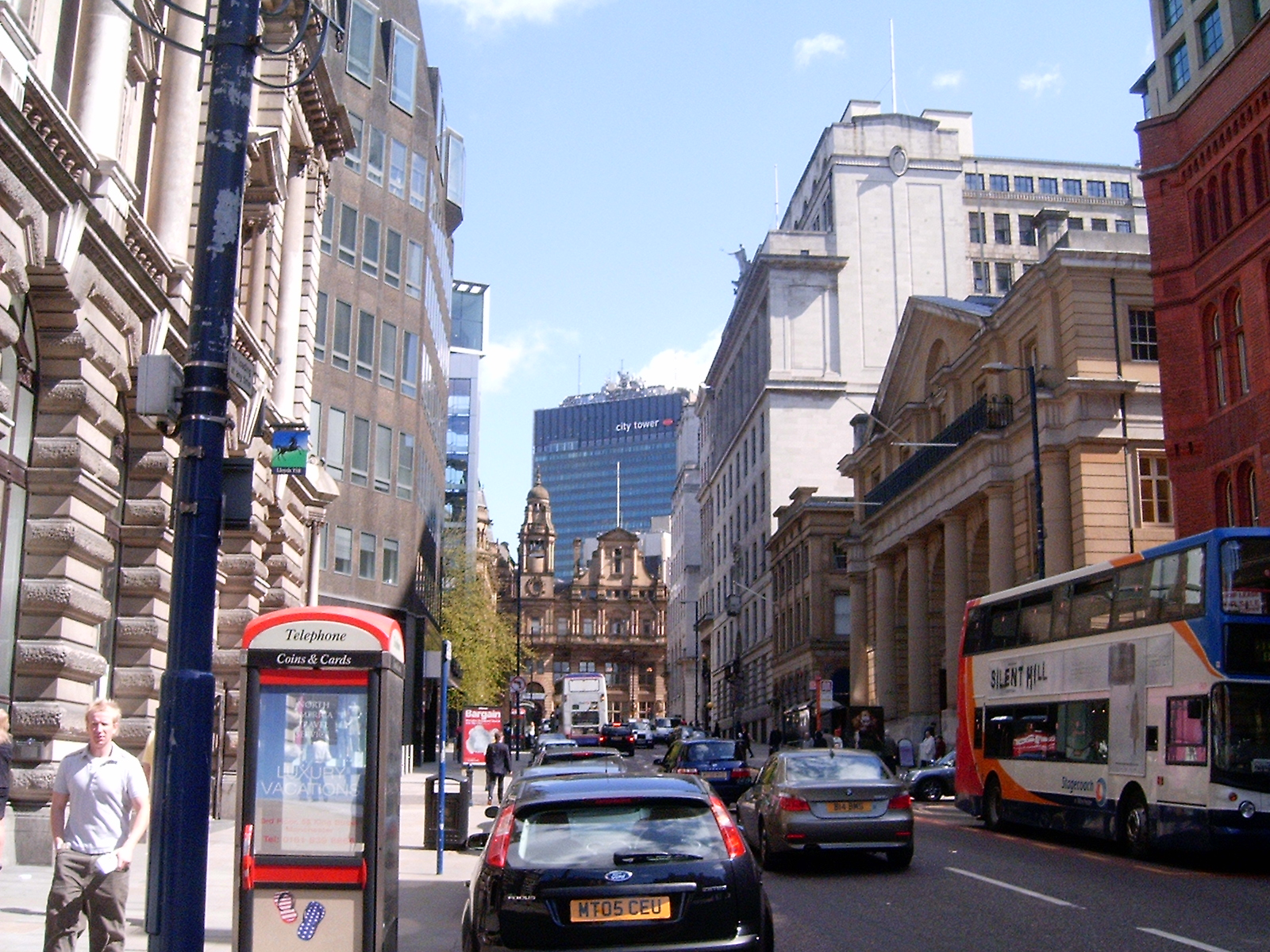
King Street, Manchester city centre

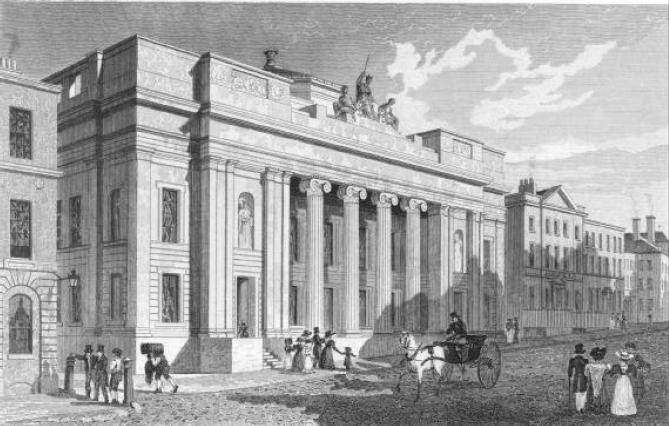
The original Manchester Town Hall

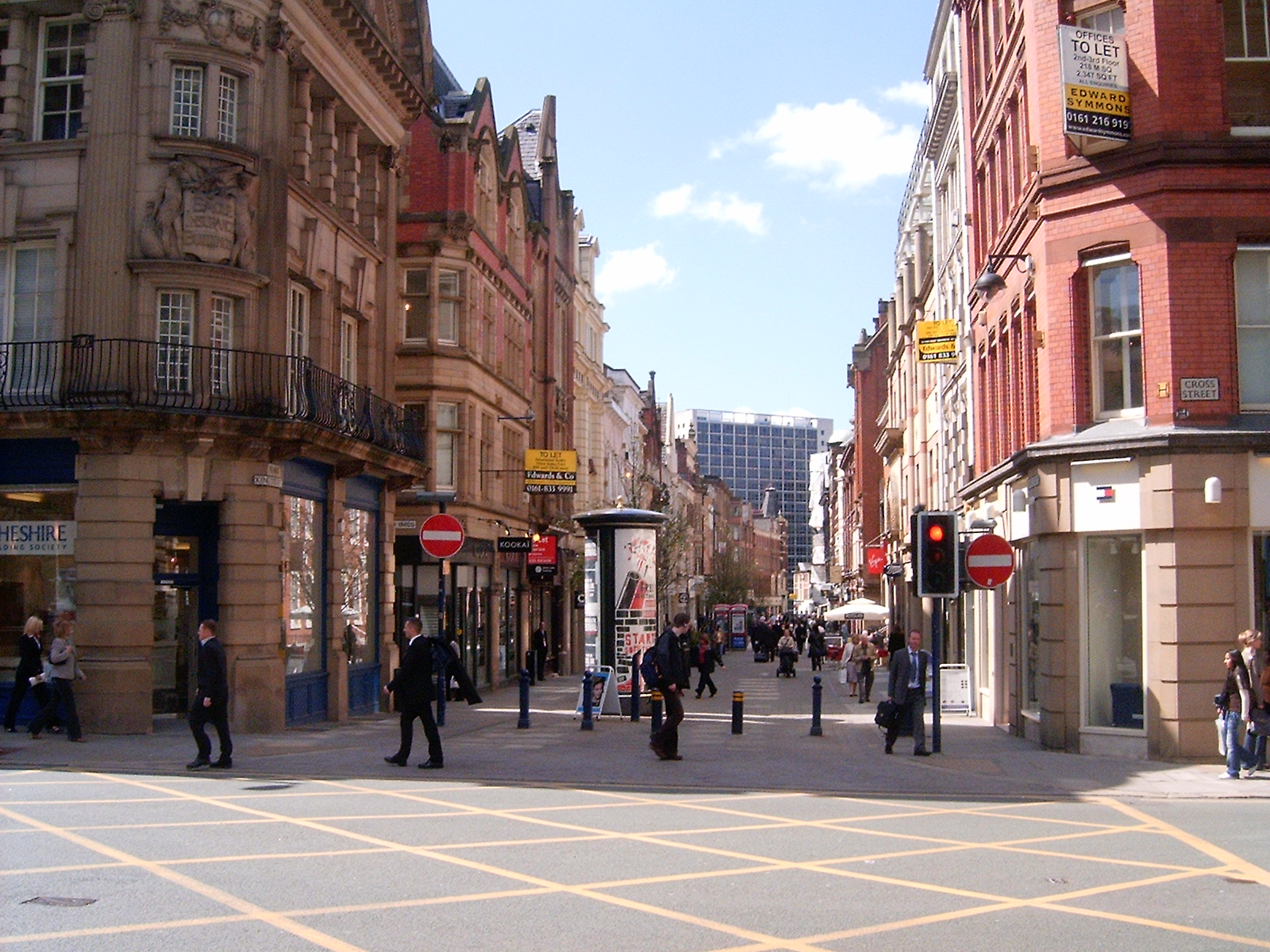
Looking down King Street towards the River Irwell

King Street is one of the most important thoroughfares of Manchester city centre, England. For much of the 20th century it was the centre of the north-west banking industry but it has become progressively dominated by upmarket retail instead of large banks.

== History ==
King Street began in the 18th century at the Spring Gardens end when the Jacobite party in the town created James's Square and to the west of it a fine street. Beyond what is now Cross Street it was much narrower and one 18th-century building remains (a former District Bank). Further west beyond Deansgate is King Street West on a different alignment. By the 1970s, there was a clear demarcation between the eastern section of mainly financial and office buildings and the narrower section to the west a mostly upmarket shopping street (later pedestrianised). Subsequently, the eastern section had the monumental National Westminster Bank offices built at no. 55 and some years later further changes increasingly brought more upmarket retail. In 2008, the grand Midland Bank building of Edwin Lutyens was vacated by HSBC Bank.

=== Old Town Hall ===
Manchester's original civic administration (a commission of police) was housed in the Police Office on King Street from 1772; it was near the junction with Deansgate and Police Street is so called because of it. It was replaced by the first Town Hall, to accommodate the growing local government and its civic assembly rooms. The Town Hall, also located on King Street at the corner of Cross Street, was designed by Francis Goodwin and constructed during 1822–25, much of it by David Bellhouse. The building was designed in the Grecian style and Goodwin was strongly influenced by his patron John Soane. As the size and wealth of the city grew, largely as a result of the textile industry, its administration outstripped the existing facilities and a new building was proposed. The King Street building was subsequently occupied by a public library and then Lloyds Bank. The façade was removed to Heaton Park in 1912, when the current building was erected on the site (53 King Street).

== Notable buildings ==
Many notable buildings survive and are preserved in a conservation area. On King Street there are 18 buildings listed at Grade II, one at Grade II* and one at Grade I; on King Street West is one at Grade II and on South King Street nearby one more at Grade II.

Address	Image	Year	Grade	Notes	Ref.
15–17 King Street		1902	II		
19 King Street		c. 1880	II		
28 King Street		Late 19th century	II		
Old Exchange, 29–31 King Street		1897	II		
30 King Street		Late 19th century	II		
31–33 King Street West		1840	II		
33 King Street		Late 19th century	II		
35–37 King Street		1736	II	Georgian house, became Loyd Entwisle's bank in 1788. Continued under various names until incorporated into the National Westminster Bank; in the 1990s it closed and was converted into a shop.	
41 South King Street		Late 19th century	II		
48 King Street		c. 1860–80	II		
Former Lloyds Bank, 53 King Street		1913–15	II	Later Lloyds TSB, now a restaurant. Designed by Charles Heathcote.	
54–56 King Street		c. 1700	II		
62 King Street		1874	II		
Pall Mall Court, 67 King Street		1969	II		
Former Northern Rock; Building Society, 74 King Street		1896	II	Designed by Heathcote and Rawle.	
Prudential Assurance Office, 76–80 King Street		1888	II	Designed by Alfred Waterhouse.	
Manchester Reform Club, 81 King Street		1870	II	Designed by Edward Salomons.	
Former Bank of England, 82 King Street		1846	I	Designed by C.R. Cockerell.	
84–86 King Street		c. 1910	II	Former National and Provincial Building Society.	
Ship Canal House, 88–96 King Street		1927	II	Headquarters of the Manchester Ship Canal. Designed by Harry S. Fairhurst.	
Atlas Chambers, 98 King Street		1929	II	Designed by Fairhurst and Michael Waterhouse.	
100 King Street		1929	II*	Formerly the Midland Bank (HSBC). Designed by Sir Edwin Lutyens.	

== Shopping area ==
King Street (along with Bridge Street) is considered Manchester's most upmarket shopping area; it has included the Manchester branches of Hermès, Whistles, Gant, Karen Millen, King Street Grooming, Emporio Armani, DKNY, Diesel, Timberland, Calvin Klein, Polo Ralph Lauren, Max Mara, T. M. Lewin, Jaeger, Cecil Gee, Agent Provocateur, Mulberry, Thomas Pink, Crombie. (However some of these are on Bridge Street to the south of King Street West.)

The part west of Cross Street was already a shopping street in the early 20th century.

Roger Oldham's 1906 Manchester Alphabet booklet includes the following lines:

There's King Street
And there's King Street South
And also King Street West,
They each of them begin with K,
I know which I like the best--
The one in which the cake shop is--
Let's go inside and rest.

== See also ==
- List of streets in Manchester
