= Manchester Reform Club =

Listed building in Manchester, England

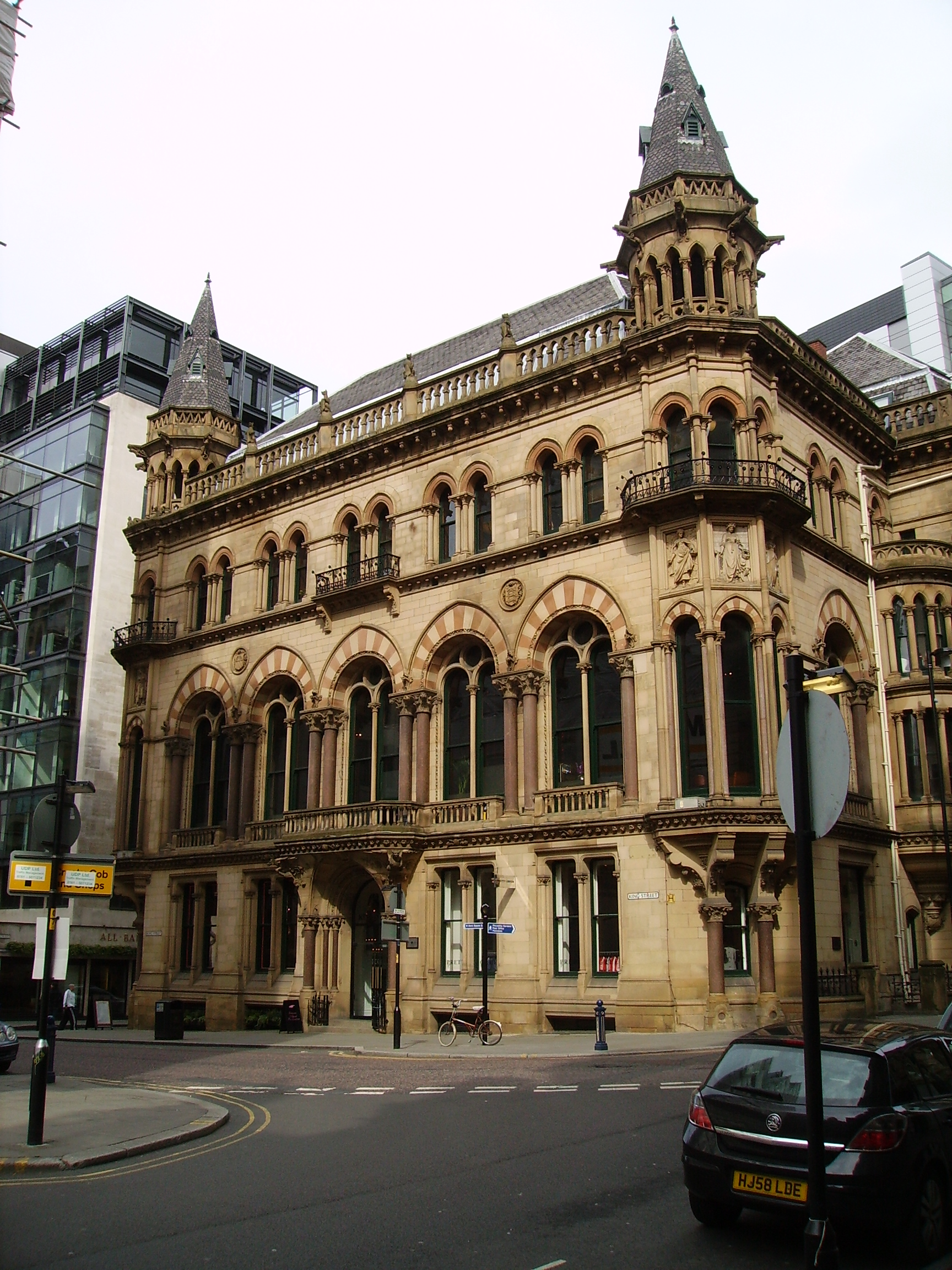
- Manchester Reform Club in 2011

- Location within Greater Manchester

General information
- Architectural style: Venetian Gothic
- Location: 81 King Street (former Reform Club) and 50 Spring Gardens (former Manchester Club), Manchester, England
- Coordinates: 53.4809°N 2.2422°W
- Construction started: 1870
- Completed: 1871
- Cost: £20,000
- Client: Liberal Party

Technical details
- Material: Sandstone ashlar

Design and construction
- Architects: Edward Salomons, John Philpot Jones
- Designations

Listed Building – Grade II*
- Official name: Former Reform Club Manchester Club
- Designated: 3 October 1974
- Reference no.: 1282987

The Reform Club is a Grade II* listed former gentlemen's club dating from the Victorian period, at the corner of King Street and Spring Gardens in Manchester, England. Built in 1870–71 to designs by Edward Salomons and John Philpot Jones, it served as the clubhouse for the city's Liberal Party and was opened in October 1871 by the Foreign Secretary, the 2nd Earl Granville. The building was listed in 1974 and later saw a series of changes in use following the decline of the club, including periods as a restaurant and bar. Since 2022 it has housed House of Books & Friends, an independent bookshop and community space.

== History ==
The building was constructed between 1870 and 1871, according to its official listing. It was designed by Edward Salomons in collaboration with the Irish architect John Philpot Jones. The construction contract was awarded to Mr. Nield, a Manchester builder, for £20,000. The Reform was built as the club house for Manchester's Liberal Party and was opened by Granville Leveson-Gower, 2nd Earl Granville and Liberal Foreign Secretary, on 19 October 1871.

On 3 October 1974, the former reform club was designated a Grade II* listed building.

Declining membership in the late 20th century led the club to merge with the Engineers' Club in 1967 to form the Manchester Club, but this also failed to prove financially viable and was wound up in 1988. The club's archives are held at the John Rylands Library on Deansgate. The building was later used as a restaurant and bar.

In December 2022, the building became home to House of Books & Friends, an independent bookshop, café, and events space. Funded and founded by the law firm gunnercooke, the bookshop aims to address loneliness and social isolation in the community.

== Architecture ==
The building is faced in sandstone with coloured stone detailing and has hipped slate roofs. It occupies a corner plot and is arranged as two parallel ranges, with the rear section projecting to the right. It is designed in a Venetian Gothic style and has three main storeys, a basement and an attic. The front elevation is symmetrical, with five bays and chamfered corners, and includes a plinth, floor‑level cornices, corner oriels finished as small turrets, a prominent main cornice and a parapet with blind arcading.

The ground floor has a main entrance featuring extensive masonry carving, including gargoyles and "winged beasts". It is set within a porch of small columns, supporting a first‑floor balcony. The other bays contain paired sash windows, and the corners have similar small columns beneath the projecting oriels, one corner containing a window and the other a doorway. The tall first floor is arranged as a series of large arches carried on paired columns, each arch containing a two‑light sash window with arched heads, circular tracery and a balcony. The second floor has smaller paired arched windows with an impost band and a small iron balcony to the central pair. Former dormers and a central spire have been removed.

The corner oriels are highly decorated, with slender arched windows on the first floor, carved panels above, a second‑floor balcony with ironwork, and a small arcaded cupola with projecting carved figures. The side elevations repeat the treatment of the front in the first bay but are simpler beyond, with the right‑hand side featuring a curved two‑storey oriel at the junction with the rear wing.

Inside, there is a "fine" staircase, a two-storey main dining room, and a very large billiard room on the third floor that runs the entire length of the building. The hall and staircase have linenfold panelling.

Architectural historian Clare Hartwell, in her Manchester Pevsner City Guide, considers the club Salomons' "best city-centre building".

== See also ==
- Grade II* listed buildings in Greater Manchester
- Listed buildings in Manchester-M2

== Bibliography ==
- Hartwell, Clare (2001). Manchester. Pevsner Architectural Guides. London: Penguin. ISBN 0-14-071131-7.
