= Spring Gardens, Manchester =

Street in Manchester, England

Coordinates: 53.4811°N 2.2414°W

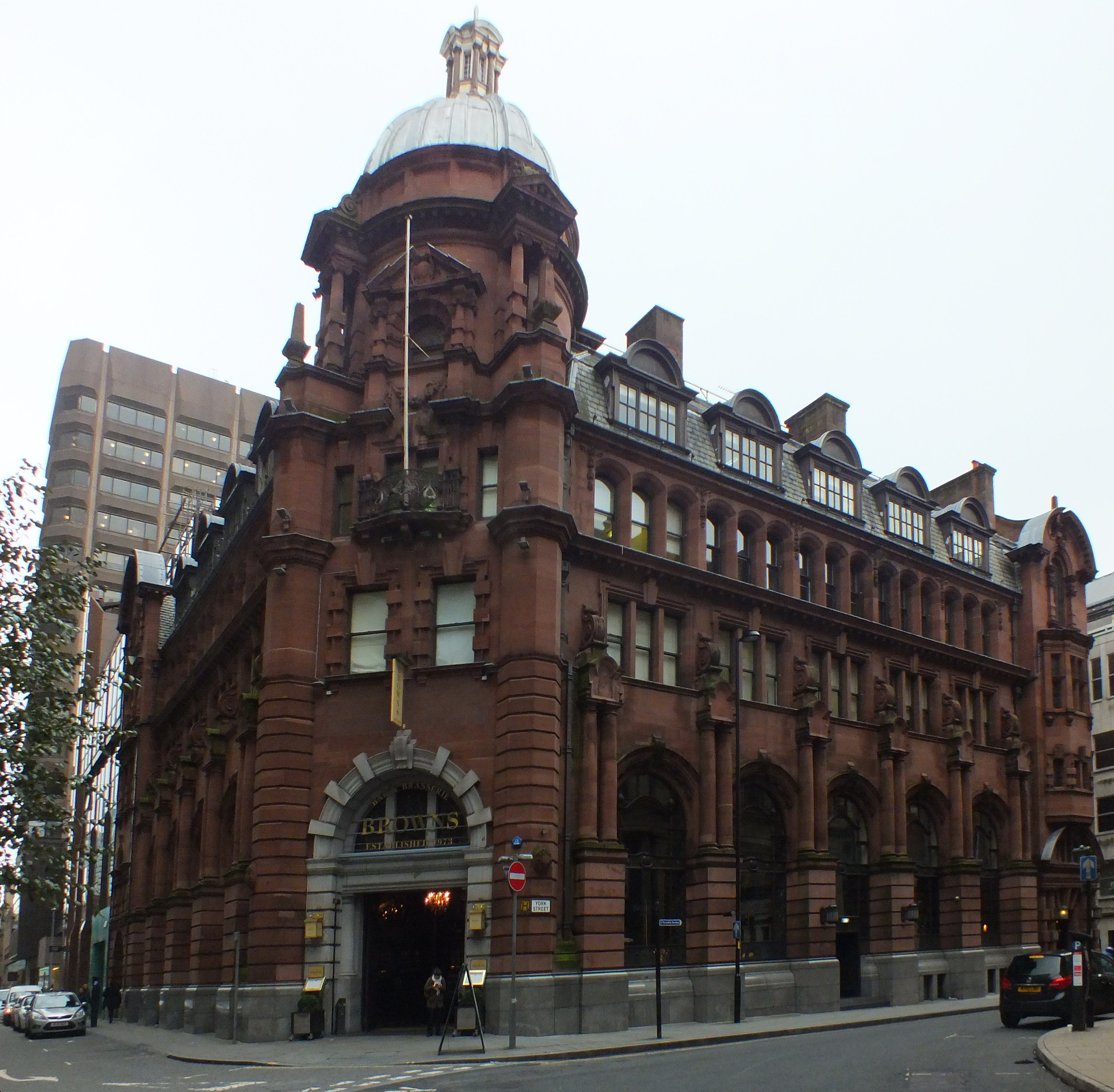
The Grade II* listed former Parr's Bank

Spring Gardens is an important thoroughfare in Manchester city centre, England. This L-shaped street, formerly the centre of the North West's banking industry, has five Grade II listed buildings and is part of the Upper King Street conservation area.

== Location ==
Spring Gardens begins at the junction of Charlotte Street and Mosley Street, crossing Fountain Street and Concert Lane, before continuing north to the eastern end of King Street. A one-way system prevents vehicles from travelling further north on Spring Gardens as it joins York Street (there is a loop via Fountain Street and Marble Street to rejoin), however pedestrians can continue north-northeast on Spring Gardens and a pedestrianised section to join Market Street.

== Notable buildings ==
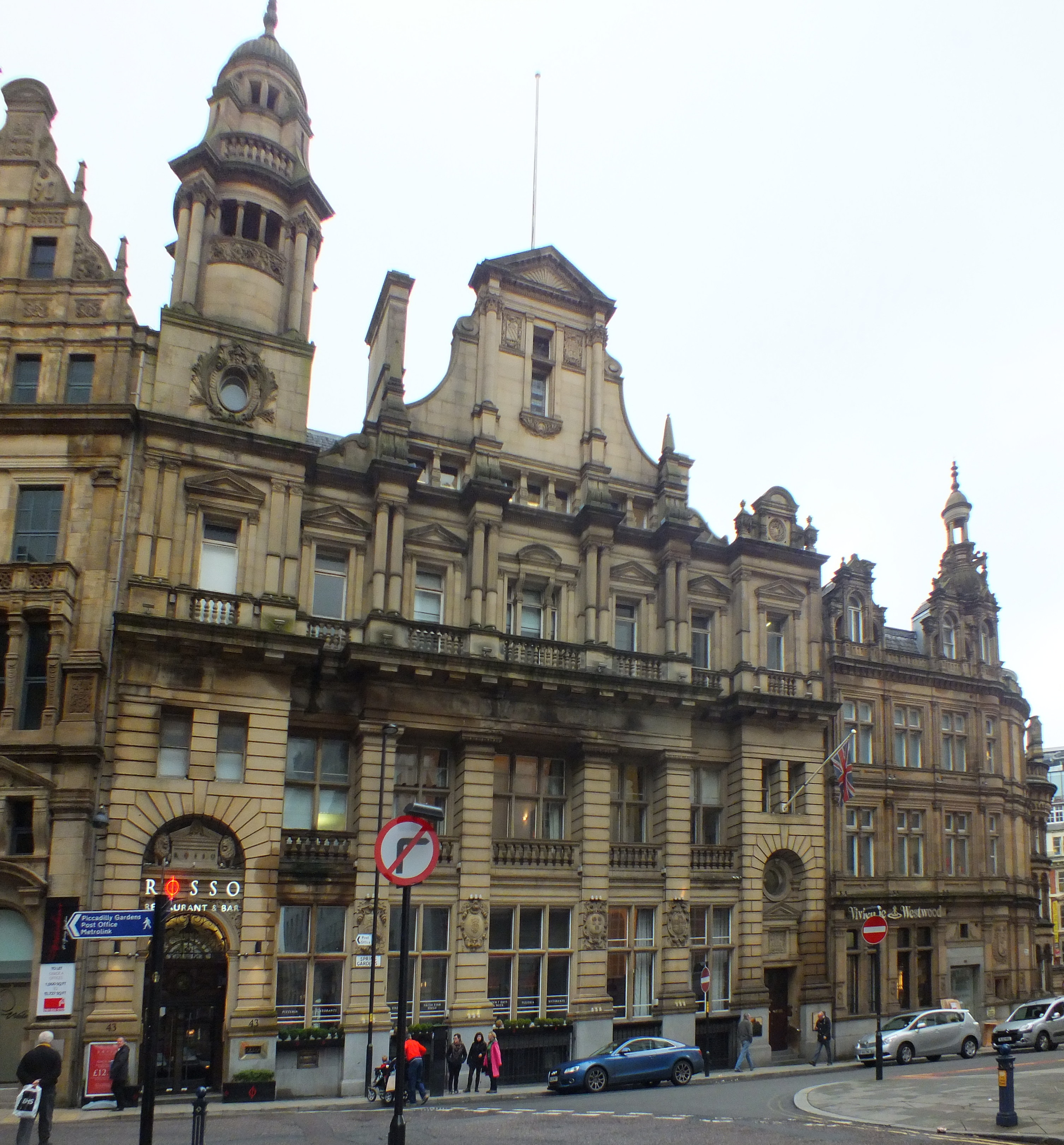
43–49 Spring Gardens

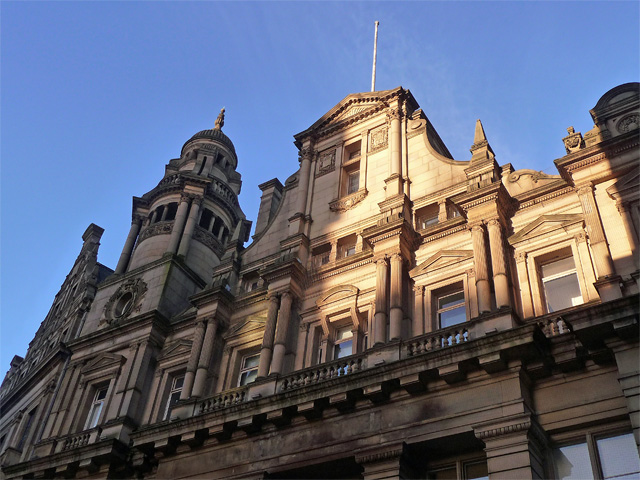
Detail of 43-45

Five buildings are listed Grade II.

Even nos. (west side)

- Tootal House, John Radcliffe and Associates 1982
- Lowry House, with a 58 metres (190 ft) tower, Arthur Smith and Associates 1975–76
- Nos. 60 and 62. A former warehouse, built in 1881–1883 by Alfred Waterhouse, then occupied by Minster Insurance. Grade II

Odd nos. (east side)

- The Post Office, Cruikshank & Seward (1969). There has been a post office in Spring Gardens since 1623, this building was the largest post office in the north of England when built. The upper interior wall is lined with bold fibreglass panels, in the style of William Mitchell, however the designer remains anonymous.
- Amethyst House by Howitt and Tucker. 1973; demolished
- 1 York St, former Parr's Bank. Grade II*. 1902 by Charles Henry Heathcote
- No. 41 Waterhouse's 1888–1890 building for the National Provincial Bank. Grade II
- Nos. 43 and 45. Lancashire & Yorkshire Bank, 1890 by Heathcote & Rawle
- No. 47. The Commercial Union Assurance Society building, built by Charles Henry Heathcote in 1881. Former Barclay's Bank. Grade II
- No. 49. Formerly a warehouse designed by Clegg & Knowles in 1879. Grade II

== See also ==
- List of streets in Manchester
