= 100 King Street =

Building in Manchester, England

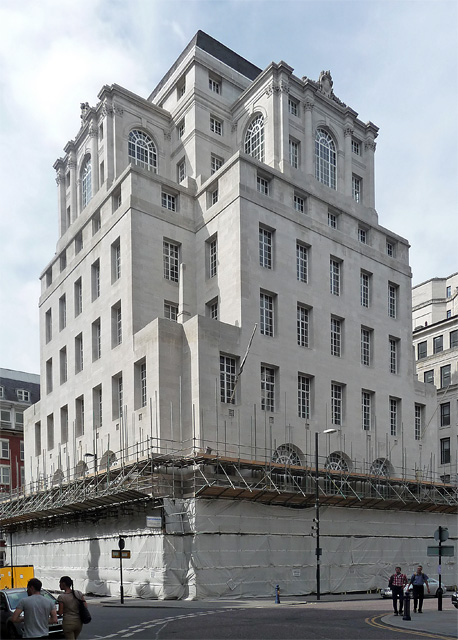
- 100 King Street, Manchester
- Former names: HSBC Bank building, Midland Bank Building

General information
- Architectural style: Modernist Classical
- Location: 56 Spring Gardens, Manchester, United Kingdom
- Coordinates: 53.4806°N 2.2422°W
- Construction started: 1933
- Completed: 1935

Height
- Height: 46 m (151 ft)

Technical details
- Floor count: 10

Design and construction
- Architect: Sir Edwin Lutyens
- Designations

Listed Building – Grade II*
- Official name: Former Midland Bank
- Designated: 3 October 1974
- Reference no.: 1219241

100 King Street, formerly the Midland Bank, is a former bank premises on King Street in Manchester, England. It was designed by Sir Edwin Lutyens in 1928 and constructed in 1933–35. It is Lutyens' major work in Manchester and was designated a Grade II* listed building in 1974.

== Architecture ==
The architects for the former bank, a castle-like Art Deco building surrounded by roads on all four sides, were Lutyens in collaboration with Whinney, Son & Austen Hall. It was built between 1933 and 1935 by J. Gerrard & Sons of Swinton and features carvings by the local sculptor John Ashton Floyd. It is constructed of Portland stone around a steel frame. Its neoclassical design is unusual for Manchester; the style perhaps more suited to the architecture of Liverpool, as most of Manchester's buildings are Neogothic.

"The proportions are ingeniously calculated, as Lutyens ... adored to do. The top stage is two-thirds of the stage from the obelisks to the next set-back, and that middle stage is two-thirds of the bottom stage." It is sometimes known as The King of King Street because of its distinct structure and height.

From 1912, Lutyens laid out New Delhi as the new capital of India. He devised his own Delhi Order of classical architecture there, with small bells hanging from the capitals of the columns, and subsequently made use of this order in his design for the bank.

== History ==
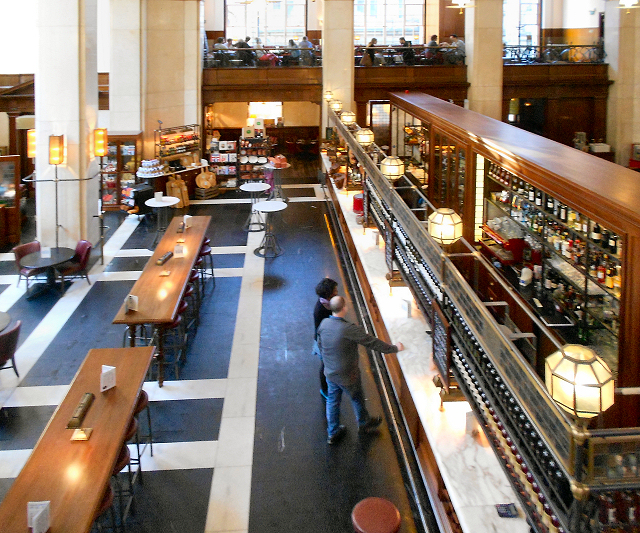
Former banking hall, converted into restaurant

The bank was renamed HSBC Bank after HSBC acquired the Midland Bank in the 1990s. It closed on 6 June 2008 when HSBC relocated to St Ann's Square. The building was subsequently refurbished to provide office space and was placed on the office rental market in March 2010. Jamie Oliver opened an Italian restaurant in the former banking hall in 2011, which closed in 2019 after the company went into administration. A plan to convert the upper floors of the building into a boutique hotel was announced in 2013.

In April 2015, the Hotel Gotham opened on the upper floors of the building.

In August 2022, Gordon Ramsay announced that he planned to open a restaurant in the unit formerly occupied by Jamie's Italian. 'Lucky Cat Manchester', Ramsey's Tokyo-themed restaurant, opened at the site on 1 June 2023. The restaurant spans three floors and features a private dining room situated in the underground bank vault.

== See also ==
- Grade II* listed buildings in Greater Manchester
- Listed buildings in Manchester-M2
