= Ship Canal House =

Listed building in Manchester, England

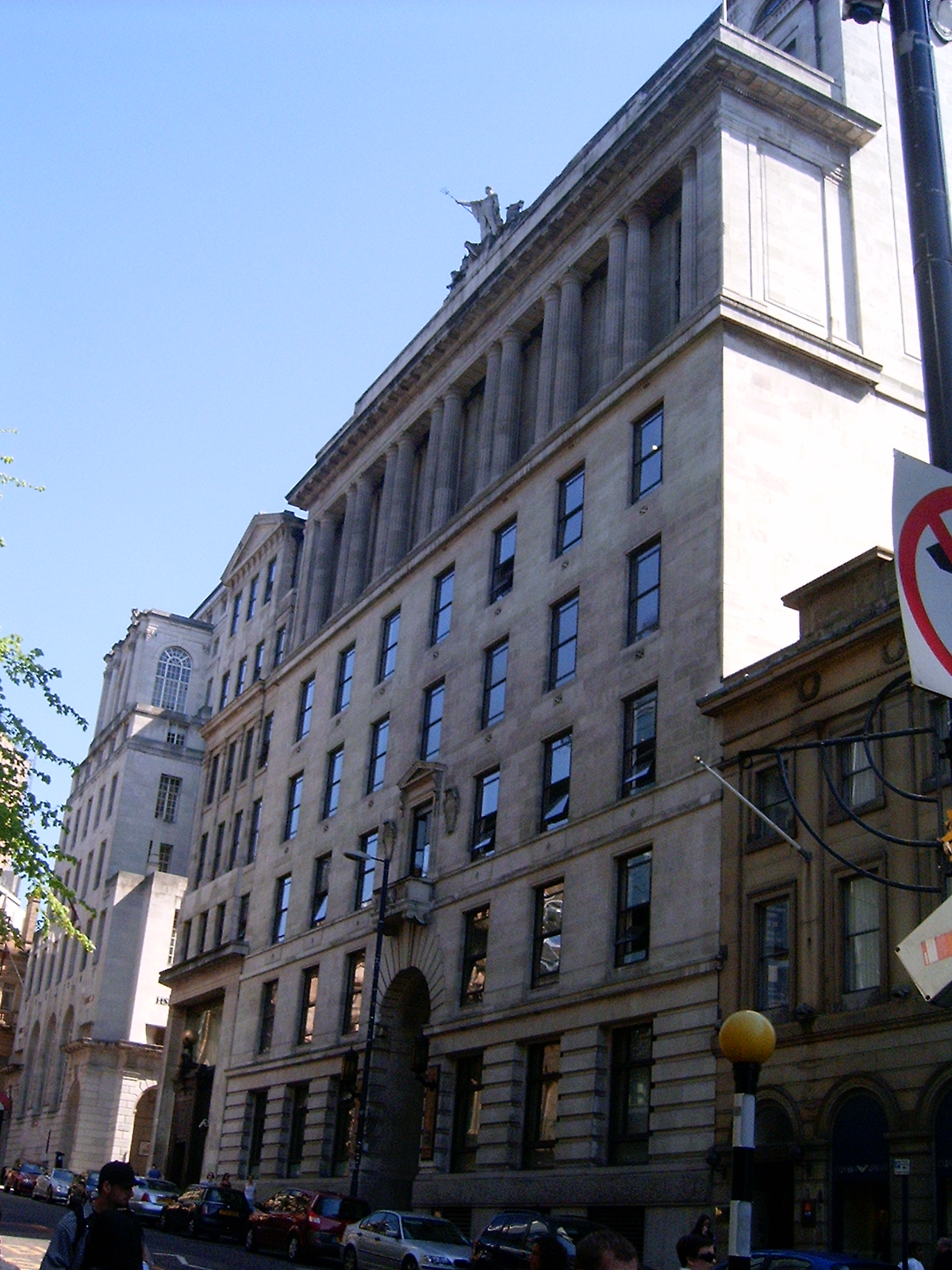
- Ship Canal House, Manchester

General information
- Architectural style: Neo-classical
- Location: King Street, Manchester, England
- Coordinates: 53.4807°N 2.2431°W
- Completed: 1927
- Client: Manchester Ship Canal Company
- Owner: Grosvenor

Design and construction
- Architect: Harry S. Fairhurst
- Designations

Listed Building – Grade II
- Official name: Ship Canal House
- Designated: 9 March 1982
- Reference no.: 1219203

Ship Canal House is a building in Manchester, England, which was built in 1927 for the Manchester Ship Canal Company. The building is located on King Street, historically the centre for Manchester's banking industry.

The building was designed by Harry S Fairhurst in a neo-classical style and displays some Art Deco and Edwardian Baroque motifs, such as square windows and roof sculptures which were prevalent during the 1920s. It stands 46 metres (151 ft) tall with 11 storeys and is clad in Portland stone. It was one of the tallest office blocks in the United Kingdom when completed in 1927. The building built by J. Gerrard & Sons Ltd of Swinton was Grade II listed in 1982. Ship Canal House was sold in 2011 for £22.8 million. In 2022 it was bought by Grosvenor for £30 million.

== See also ==
- Listed buildings in Manchester-M2
