= Edward Salomons =

English architect

- Edward Salomons
- Born: 1828; London
- Died: 12 May 1906; Rusholme, Manchester
- Occupation: Architect
- Parent: Henry Moses Salomons & Priscilla Lucas
- Buildings: Manchester Jewish Museum, Manchester Reform Club, New West End Synagogue

Edward Salomons (1828–1906) was an English architect based in Manchester, active in the late 19th century. He is known for his architecture in the Gothic Revival and Italianate styles.

== Education and career ==
Edward Salomons was born in London in 1828 to Priscilla (née Lucas) and Henry Moses Salomons, a cotton trader originally from Germany. He was a middle child of a large family. They moved in Manchester in around 1837, living in Plymouth Grove. The family was part of the city's Jewish community. Edward Salomons was predominantly educated at home, and worked for a short time in the family business before reading architecture at the Manchester School of Design (c. 1850). He trained with John Edgar Gregan for a year and then worked for the ecclesiastical architects H. Bowman and J. S. Crowther, where he (as well as Thomas Worthington) contributed to their book, The Churches of the Middle Ages.

In 1852 or 1853 he started to practise independently from an office on King Street, coming second in an 1853 competition to design the Free Trade Hall. An early commission, in 1856, was for a Fountain Street warehouse. The following year he worked under C. D. Young on the Art Treasures Exhibition, and this prominent project led to further commissions, including one for offices of the Examiner and Times (1858). In 1860 he was elected a fellow of the Royal Institute of British Architects.

A significant early commission was for the Prince's Theatre, Oxford Street, Manchester (c. 1864). He also designed theatres in Liverpool (Prince of Wales, later the Alexandra Theatre; 1865–66) and Rochdale (1867). In 1867, Salomons was among the eight finalists in the design competition for the new Manchester Town Hall. His entry was unsuccessful and the contract was awarded to Alfred Waterhouse.

At various times during his career Salomons worked in partnership with John Philpot-Jones, Ralph Seldon Wornum, John Ely and Alfred Steinthal. Salomons was twice president of the Manchester Society of Architects, of which he was one of the founding members.

== Works ==
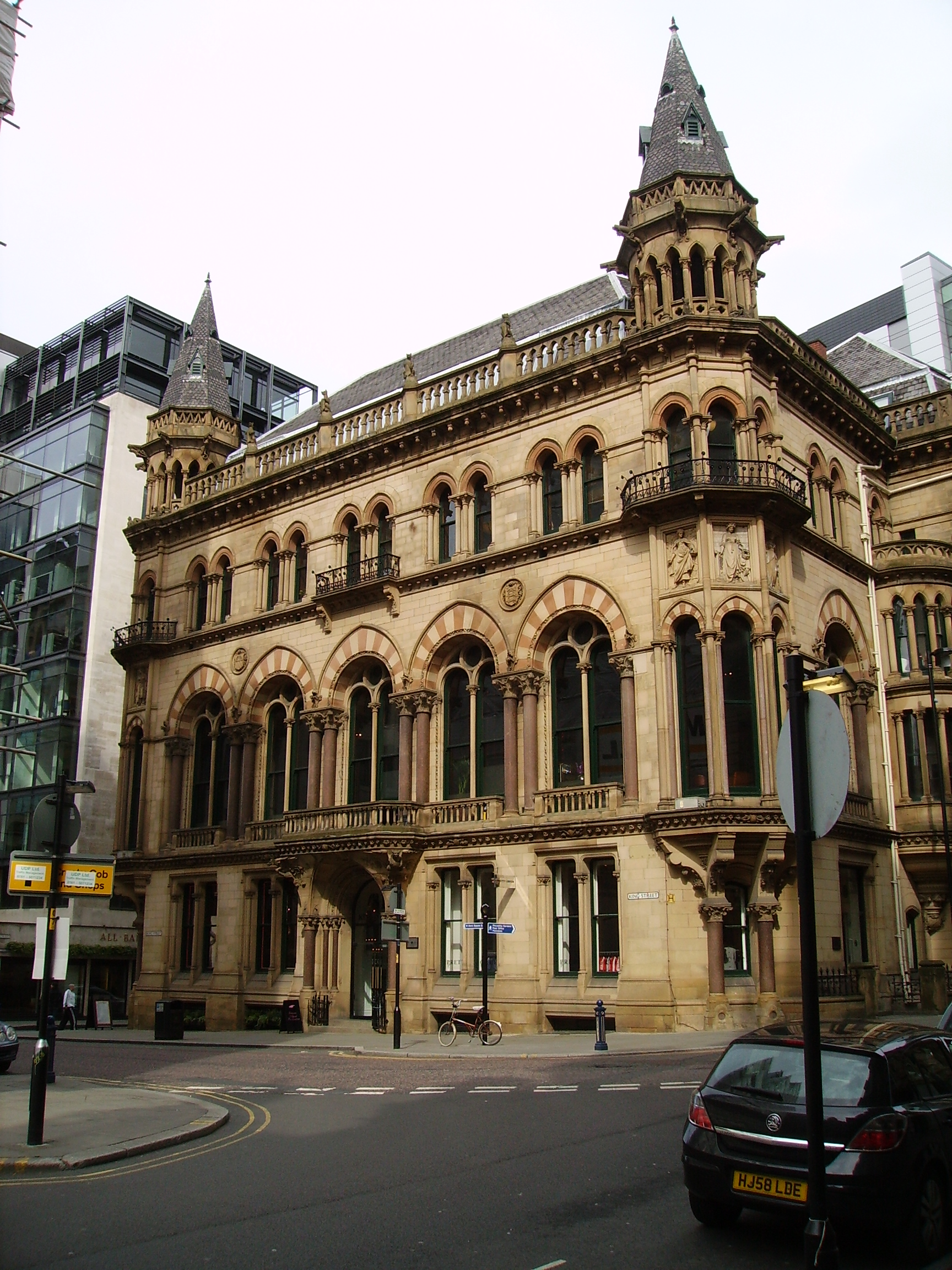
Manchester Reform Club (1871)

His prominent commissions in Manchester include the Spanish and Portuguese Synagogue (now the Manchester Jewish Museum) (1874), the Manchester Reform Club (1870–1871), described by Claire Hartwell, in her Manchester Pevsner City Guide, as Salomon's "best city-centre building", the former Manchester and Salford Trustee Savings Bank (1872) and Manchester Crematorium (with Steinthal; 1890). He also designed two other synagogues in Manchester, as well as the Jews' School, Derby Street (1868–69). In London, he assisted with the design of the Agnew Gallery on Old Bond Street (1876) and the New West End Synagogue (1863). He also (with Wornum and Ely) designed premises for the Agnews in Liverpool.

Among his buildings which have since been demolished are the Exhibition Hall, built for the 1857 Art Treasures Exhibition in Old Trafford, Manchester (demolished 1858), and the Prince's Theatre in St Peter's Square, Manchester (opened 1864, closed 1940).

He built many private houses; in and around Manchester these include two houses in Victoria Park (1880s) and big houses in Knutsford and Didsbury, as well as Caenwood Towers (later Athlone House) in Highgate, London, and houses in Amsterdam, Brussels and Biarritz. He renovated Alvaston Hall (with Steinthal; 1897). An unusual commission was for the casing of an electric clock with a descending ball, designed in 1872 for the St Ann's Square shop of the Manchester watchmakers Arnold & Lewis.

== Personal life ==
Salomons married twice: in 1863 to Carlotta Marion Montgorry (also given as Montgarry) from Liverpool, and then in 1877 to Gertrude Bruce Roberts, with whom he had two sons and a daughter. His two sons from the first marriage both predeceased him. One of his sons, Gerald, became an architect, changing his surname to Sanville.

A skilled artist in watercolours, he was an elected member of the Manchester Academy of Fine Arts (1859) and was active on committees of the Manchester School of Art and the City Art Gallery. He was a member of several Manchester clubs.

He died on 12 May 1906 in Rusholme, and was cremated at Manchester Crematorium.

== Gallery ==
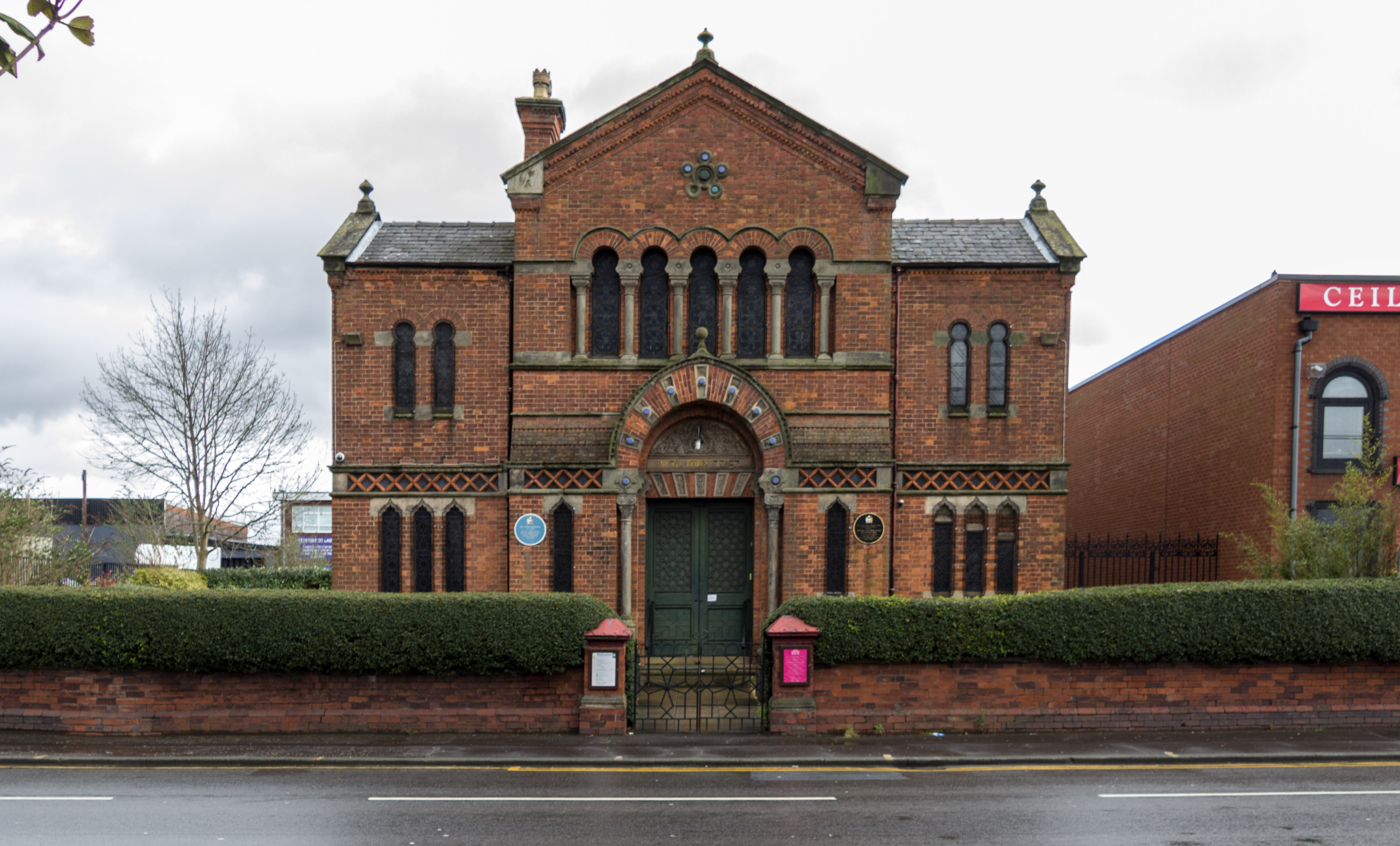
Manchester Jewish Museum (1875)

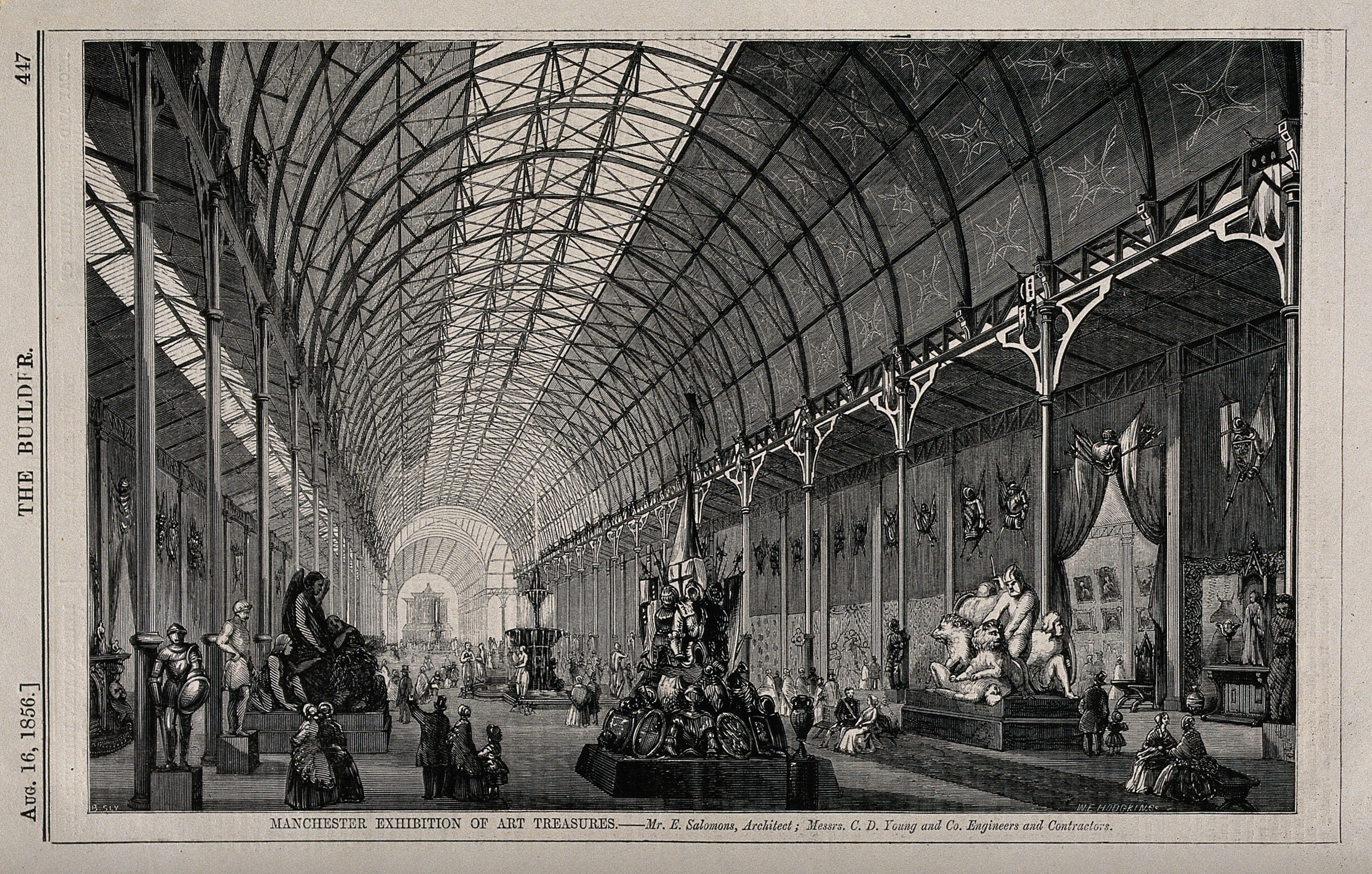
Art Treasures Exhibition Hall (1857)

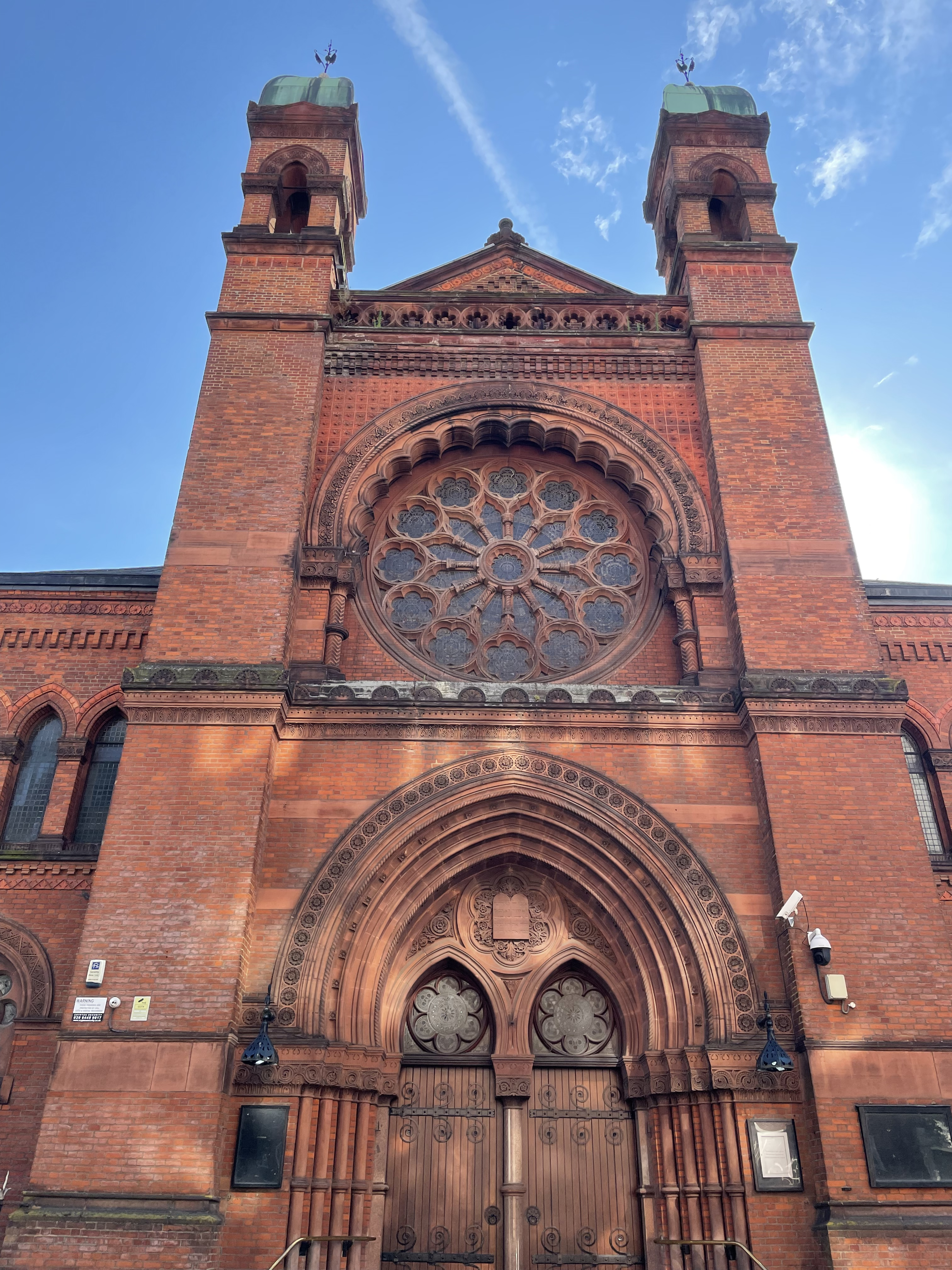
New West End Synagogue (1879)

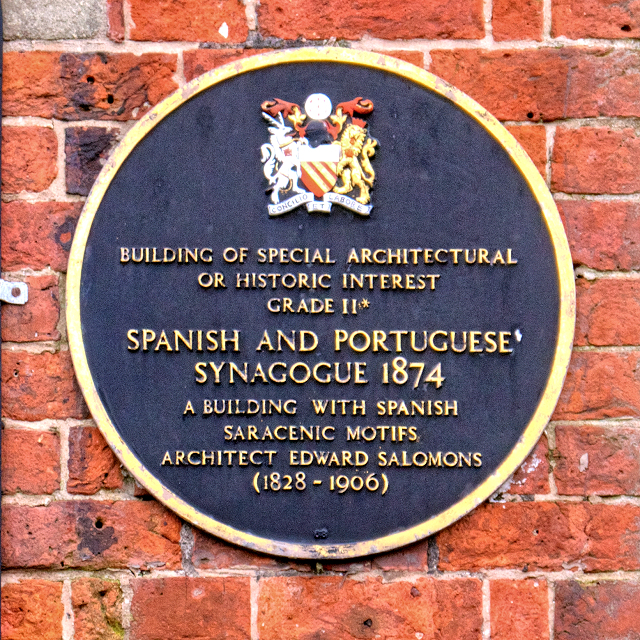
Blue Plaque commemorating Salomon on the Manchester Jewish Museum

== Sources ==
- Hartwell, Claire (2001). Manchester. Pevsner Architectural Guides. New Haven, Us and London: Yale University Press. ISBN 978-0-300-09666-8. OCLC 754885893.
- Parkinson-Bailey, John J. (2000). Manchester: An Architectural History. Manchester: Manchester University Press. ISBN 978-0-719-05606-2. OCLC 490960269.
