= Former National Westminster Bank =

Listed building in Manchester, England

Coordinates: 53.4811°N 2.2414°W

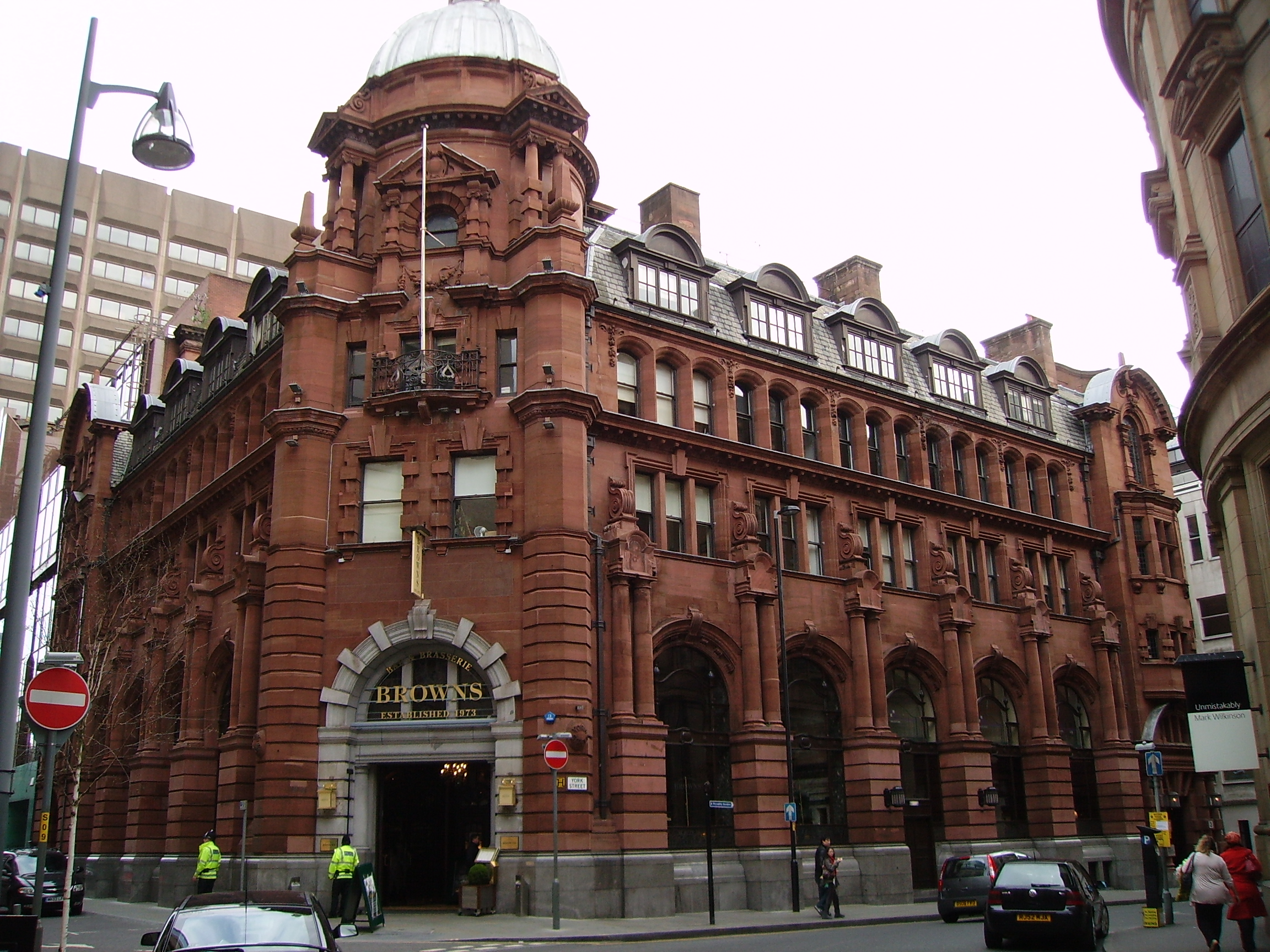
- Former National Westminster Bank, Spring Gardens and York Street
- Interactive map of the Former National Westminster Bank area

General information
- Architectural style: Edwardian Baroque
- Location: 1 York Street, Manchester, M2 2AW
- Year built: 1902
- Designations

Listed Building – Grade II*
- Official name: Former National Westminster Bank on corner at junction with Spring Gardens
- Designated: 4 January 1972
- Reference no.: 1255042

The former National Westminster Bank on Spring Gardens in Manchester, England, is an Edwardian bank building constructed in 1902 for Parr's Bank by Charles Henry Heathcote. The bank is in a "bold Edwardian Baroque" style. It is a Grade II* listed building as of 4 January 1972.

The bank is built of red sandstone with a corner tower and cupola, Doric columns supporting nothing but ornamental brackets, and hooded gables. The vast plate glass windows designed to illuminate the banking hall are particularly striking, each with "a large round-headed window filling the width of each bay, with moulded head, scrolled keystone, and plate-glass glazing with enriched bronze 'ferramenta' including a horizontal mid-panel, bottom panels with stained glass, and arched upper lights with margin panes".

The interior is "amongst the most opulent of any of the date surviving in Manchester, and for that matter, in London". The foyer has mahogany panelling, whilst the main banking hall is walled with green marble. The stained glass, some of which is original, and the ironwork on the exterior are Art Nouveau. As of March 2025, the building is a Browns brasserie and bar.

== See also ==
- Grade II* listed buildings in Greater Manchester
- Listed buildings in Manchester-M2
