= Palazzo style architecture =

Style imitative of Italian palazzi

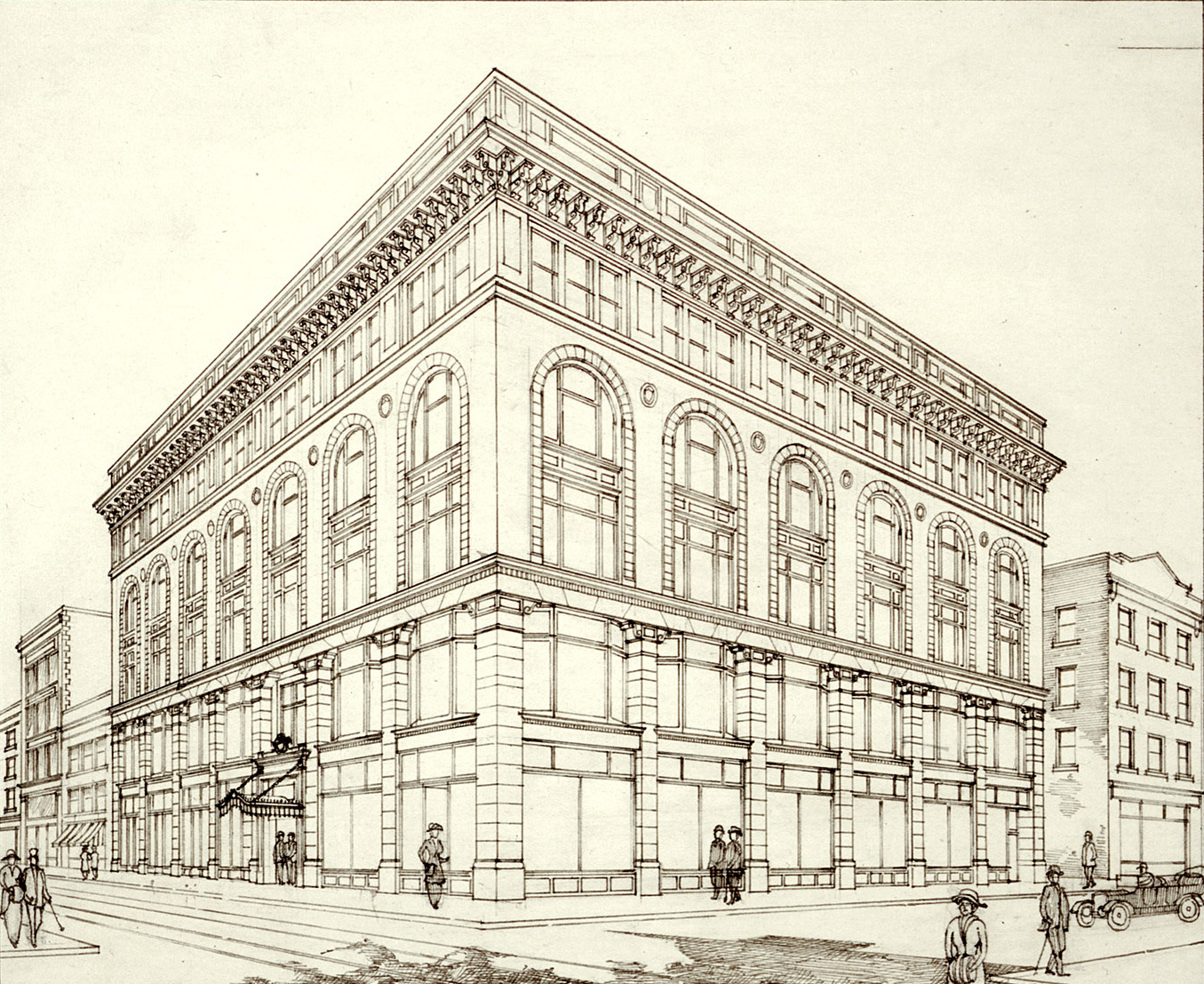
The Ryrie Building (1913–15) in Toronto, Canada

Palazzo style refers to an architectural style of the 19th and 20th centuries based upon the palazzi (palaces) built by wealthy families of the Italian Renaissance. The term refers to the general shape, proportion and a cluster of characteristics, rather than a specific design; hence it is applied to buildings spanning a period of nearly two hundred years, regardless of date, provided they are a symmetrical, corniced, basemented and with neat rows of windows. "Palazzo style" buildings of the 19th century are sometimes referred to as being of Italianate architecture, but this term is also applied to a much more ornate style, particularly of residences and public buildings.

While early Palazzo style buildings followed the forms and scale of the Italian originals closely, by the late 19th century the style was more loosely adapted and applied to commercial buildings many times larger than the originals. The architects of these buildings sometimes drew their details from sources other than the Italian Renaissance, such as Romanesque and occasionally Gothic architecture. In the 20th century, the style was superficially applied, like the Gothic Revival style, to multi-storey buildings. In the late 20th and 21st century some Postmodern architects have again drawn on the Palazzo style for city buildings.

== History ==
=== Origins ===
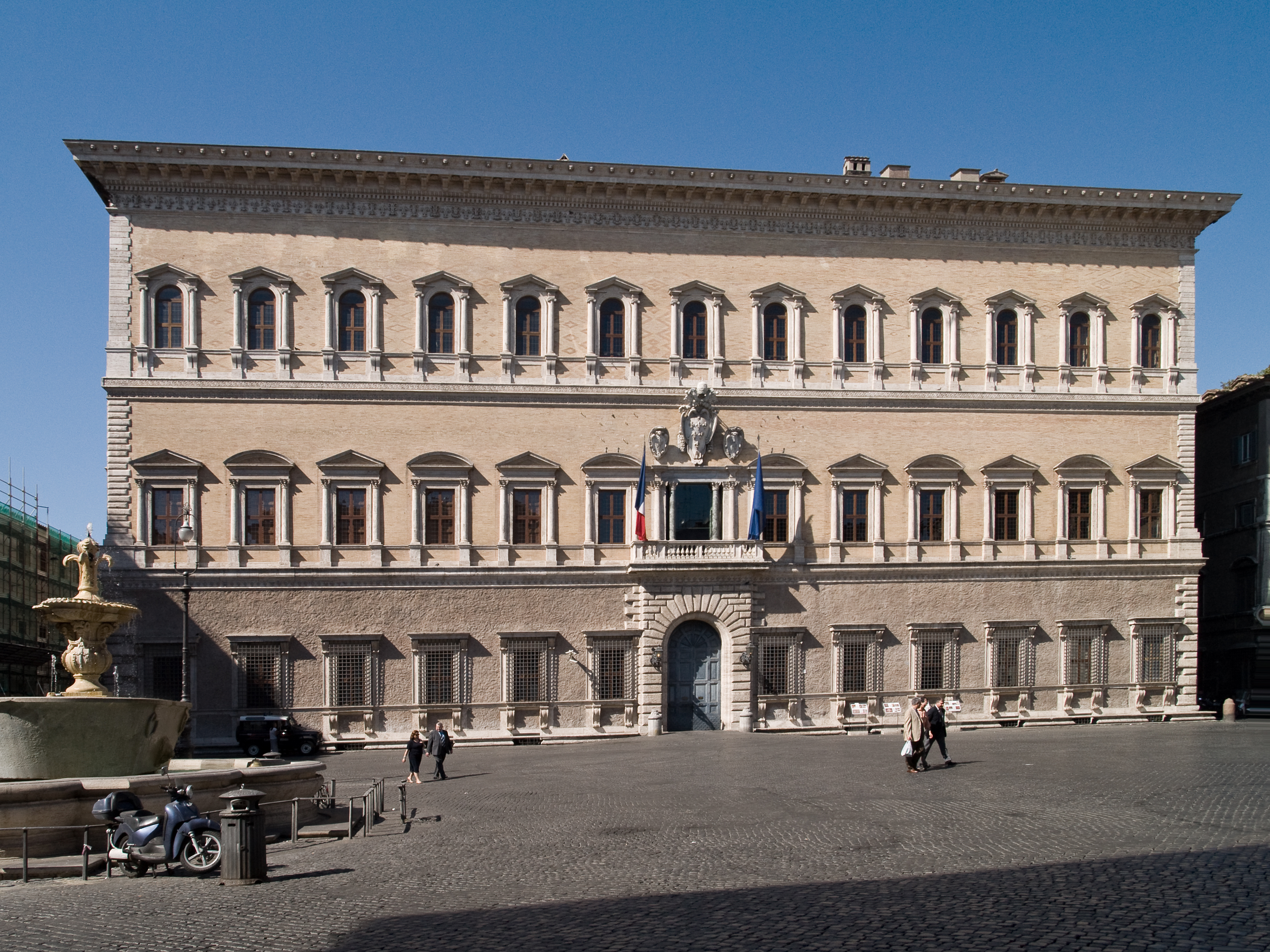
Palazzo Farnese, Rome, 16th century

The Palazzo style began in the early 16th century essentially as a revival style which drew, like Neoclassical architecture and Gothic Revival, upon archaeological styles of architecture, in this case the palaces of the Italian Renaissance. Italian palazzi, as against villas which were set in the countryside, were part of the architecture of cities, being built as town houses, the ground floor often serving as commercial premises. Early palazzi exist from the Romanesque and Gothic periods, but the definitive style dates from a period beginning in the 15th century, when many noble families had become rich on trade. Famous examples include the Palazzo Medici-Riccardi built by Michelozzo in Florence, the Palazzo Farnese built by Antonio da Sangallo the Younger and completed by Michelangelo in Rome, and the Ca' Vendramin Calergi by Mauro Codussi and Ca'Grande by Jacopo Sansovino on the Grand Canal in Venice.

=== Early 19th century ===
The earliest true Renaissance Revival "Palazzo style" buildings in Europe were built by the German architect Leo von Klenze, who usually worked in the Greek Neoclassical style. The Palais Leuchtenberg (1816) is probably the first of several such buildings on the new Ludwigstrasse in Munich, and has a rusticated half-basement and quoins, three storeys of windows with those of the second floor being pedimented, a large cornice and a shallow columned portico around the main door. The walls are stuccoed and painted like the Palazzo Farnese.

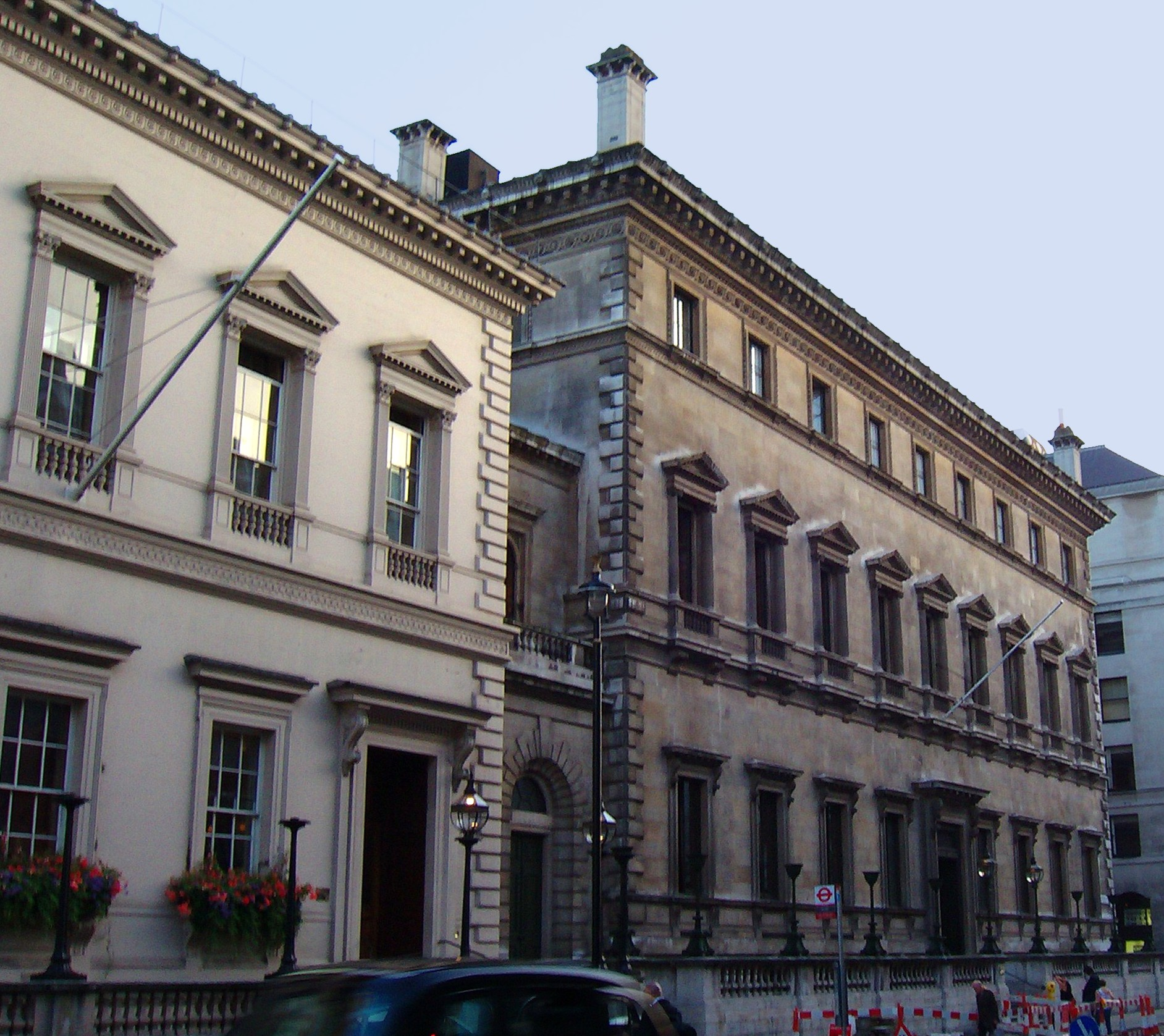
The Travellers Club (1829) and The Reform Club (1830), Pall Mall, London, by Charles Barry

In England, the earliest 19th-century application of the Palazzo style was to a number of London gentlemen's clubs. It was then applied to residences, both as town and, less commonly, country houses and to banks and commercial premises. In the late 19th century, the Palazzo style was adapted and expanded to serve as a major architectural form for department stores and warehouses. In England, the Palazzo style was at its purest in the second quarter of the 19th century. It was in competition with the Classical Revival style, which incorporated large pediments, colonnades and giant orders, lending a grandeur to public buildings as seen at the British Museum (1840s), and the more romantic Italianate and French Empire style in which much domestic architecture was built.

Early examples are the London clubs, The Athenaeum Club by Decimus Burton (1824) and The United Service Club by John Nash and Decimus Burton (1828) on Waterloo Place and Pall Mall. In 1829 Barry initiated Renaissance Revival architecture in England with his Palazzo style design for The Travellers' Club, Pall Mall. While Burton and Nash's designs draw on English Renaissance models such as Inigo Jones' Banqueting House, Whitehall and the Queen's House, Greenwich, Barry's designs are conscientiously archaeological in reproducing the proportions and forms of their Italian Renaissance models. They are Florentine in style, rather than Palladian. Barry built a second palazzo on Pall Mall, The Reform Club, (1830s) as well as The Athenaeum, Manchester. Barry's other major essays in this style are the townhouse Bridgewater House, London, (1847–57) and the country house Cliveden in Buckinghamshire, (1849–51).

After Charles Barry, the Palazzo style was adopted for different purposes, particularly banking. The Belfast Bank had its premises remodelled by Sir Charles Lanyon in 1845. No. 15 Kensington Palace Gardens (1854) by James Thomas Knowles freely adapts features of the palazzo.

=== 1850s to 1900 ===
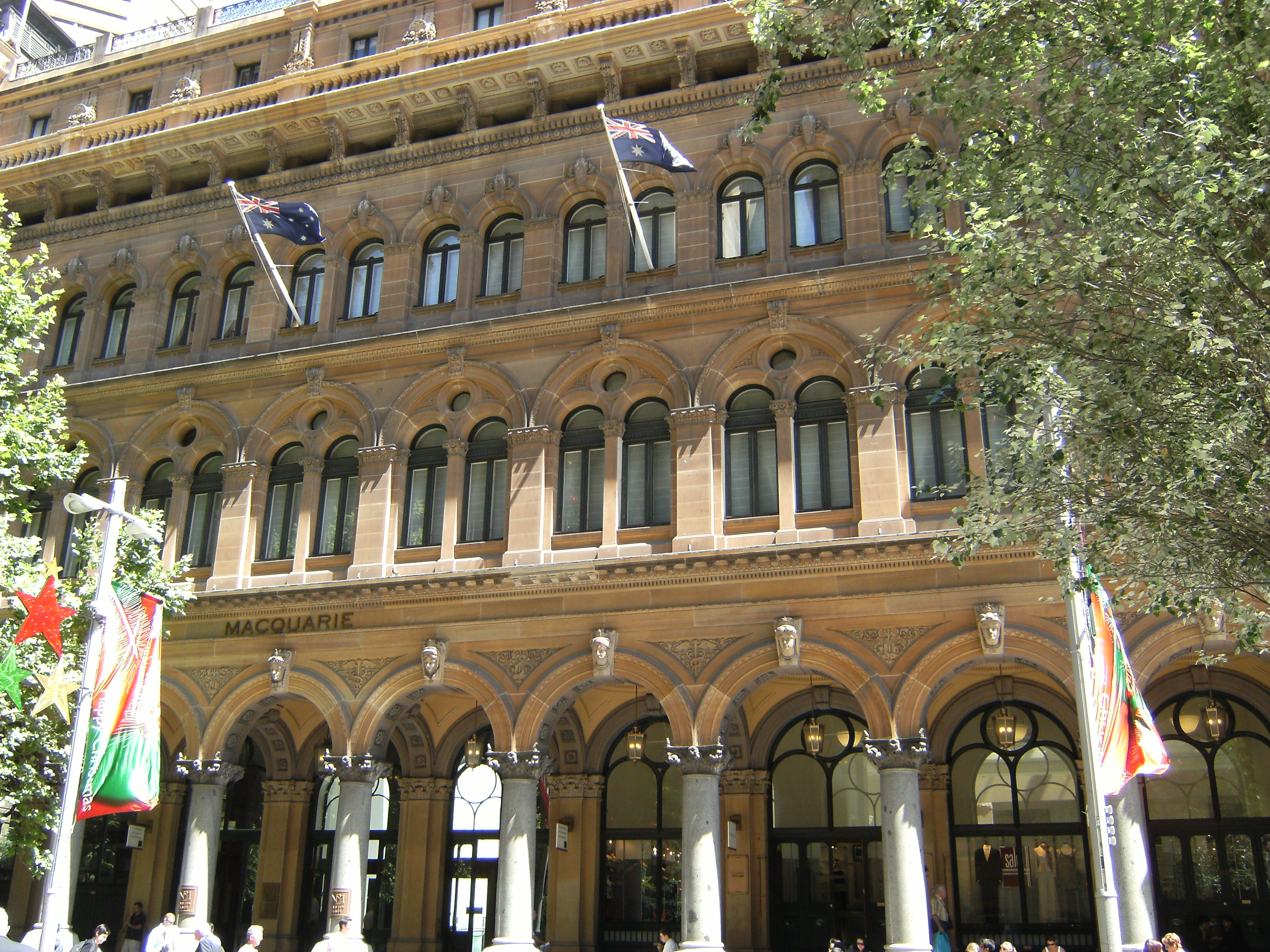
The General Post Office Building, Sydney, by James Barnet is in the Venetian Renaissance style. 1866-80

A major 19th-century architect to work extensively in the Palazzo style was Edmund Blacket. Blacket arrived in Sydney, Australia, just a few years before the discovery of gold in NSW and Victoria in 1851. Within the next decade he built the head premises of six different banking companies in Sydney, as well as branches in country towns. In Sydney, these rare examples of Blacket's early Palazzo style architecture, all constructed from the local yellow Sydney sandstone were all demolished in the period from 1965–80, to make way for taller buildings.

From the 1850s, a number of buildings were designed that expand the Palazzo style with its rustications, rows of windows, and large cornice, over very long buildings such as Grosvenor Terrace in Glasgow (1855) by J. T. Rochead and Watts Warehouse (Britannia House), Manchester, (1856) by Travis and Magnall, a "virtuoso performance" in Palazzo design. From the 1870s, many city buildings were designed to resemble Venetian rather than Florentine palazzi, and were more ornately decorated, often having arcaded loggias at street level, like James Barnet's General Post Office Building in Sydney, (1866 and 1880s). The Palazzo style was extremely popular in Manchester in the United Kingdom, particularly the work of Edward Walters, whose finest Palazzo works include the Free Trade Hall (1853) and 38 and 42 Mosley Street (1862).

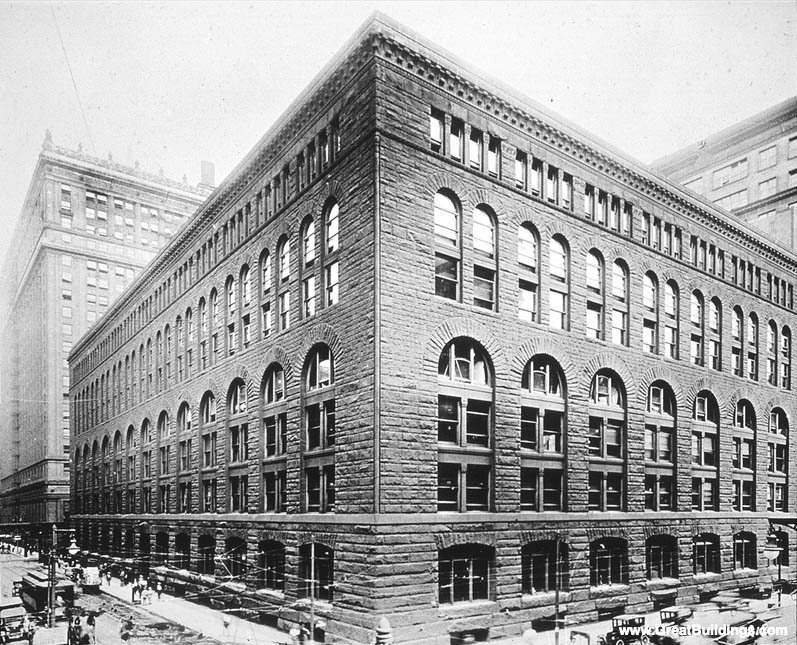
Marshall Field's Wholesale Store, (1885, lost 1930), Chicago, by Richardson

The Palazzo style found wider application in the late 19th century when it was adapted for retail and commercial buildings. Henry Hobson Richardson designed a number of buildings using the Palazzo form but remarkable for employing the Italian Romanesque rather than Renaissance style. The largest and best known of such works was Marshall Field's Wholesale Store in Chicago (1885, demolished 1930) which, with its large windows set into arcades demonstrates the direction that commercial architecture was to take, in the replacement of structural outer walls with screen walls protecting an inner structural core. Only one of Richardson's palazzo style commercial buildings remains intact, the Hayden Building in Boston.

The American architect Louis Sullivan pioneered steel-frame construction, meaning that both the floors and outer walls of a building were supported by an internal steel frame, rather than the structure of the walls. This technological development permitted the construction of much taller habitable buildings than was previously possible. Sullivan's Guaranty Building (Buffalo, New York) in Buffalo and the Wainwright Building in St. Louis demonstrate the application of the Palazzo style to tall structures, which maintain the Renaissance features of a cornice and differentiated basement but which have its cliff-like walls composed mainly of glass, the rows of windows separated by vertical bands, which also define corners of the building, giving a similar effect to quoins.

=== Early 20th century ===
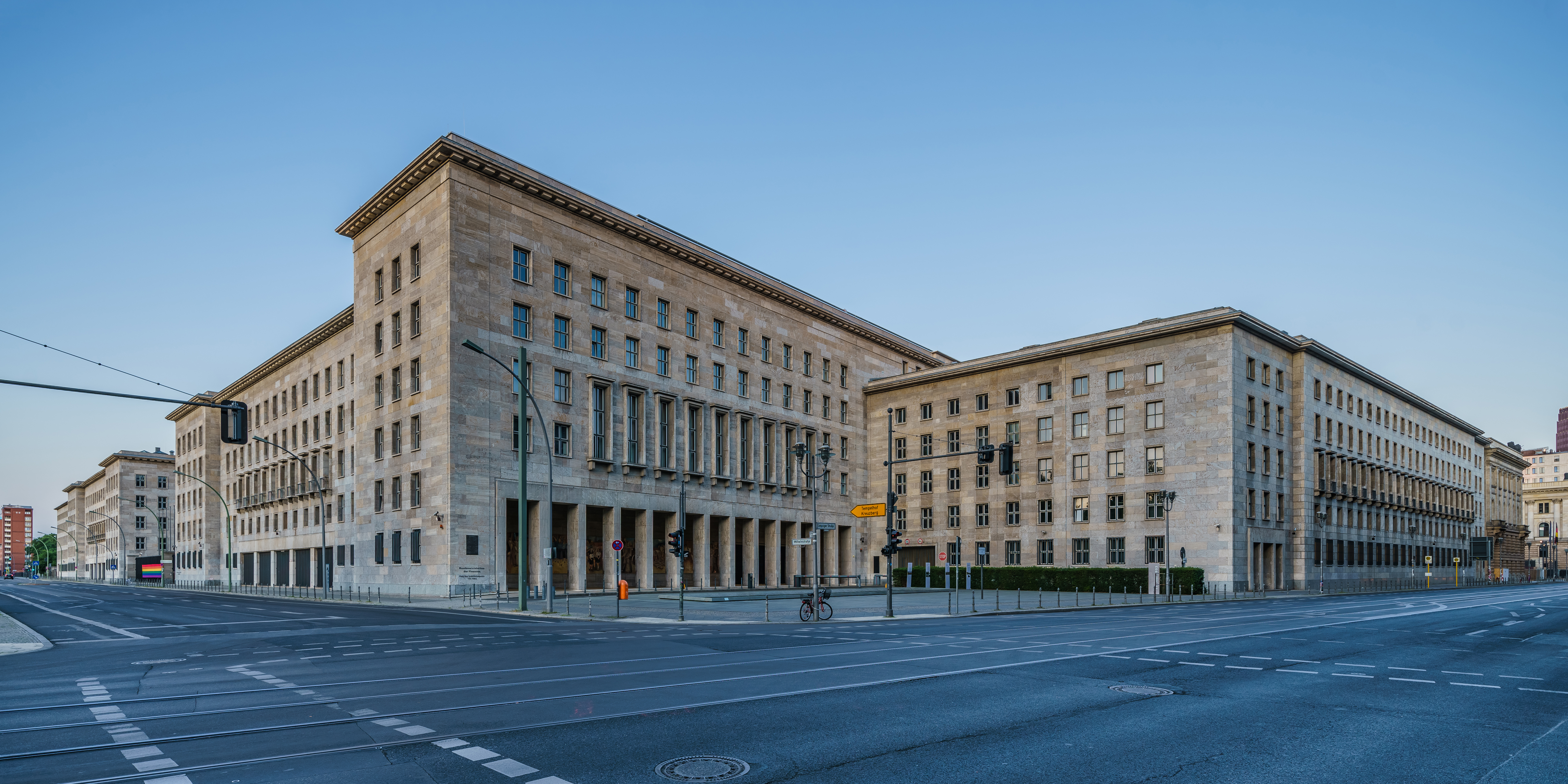
The Reich Aviation Ministry Building, Berlin, (1935–36) by Ernst Sagebiel

Palazzo style architecture remained common for large department stores through the first half of the 20th century, sometimes being given Art Deco details. The architects Starrett and van Vleck built several typical examples such as Gimbel Brothers (now Heinz 57 Center Sixth Avenue) in Pittsburgh in 1914, as well as Garfinckel's (now Hamilton Square) in Washington, D.C. in 1929. The latter building is eight storeys high, and has a pronounced course which juts like a cornice above the third level, a device that gives the lower parts of the building a more traditional Palazzo scale than the less decorated levels that rise above it. The 1924 flagship of Rich's, once one of Atlanta's main department stores, is another example of the Palazzo style.

The style was also applied to much taller buildings such as The Equitable Building (1915), designed by Ernest R. Graham, a 38-story office building in Lower Manhattan which is a landmark engineering achievement as a skyscraper.

The 1930s saw the construction of a number of government buildings in Berlin for the Third Reich, designed by Ernst Sagebiel in a stripped Palazzo style that maintains the basement and cornice but is almost devoid of decorative detail, relying for effect on the overall proportion and balance of the simple rectangular components. The Reich Aviation Ministry (now the Finance Ministry), built in 1935–36 is a notable example.

With the development of Moderne architecture the Palazzo style became less common.

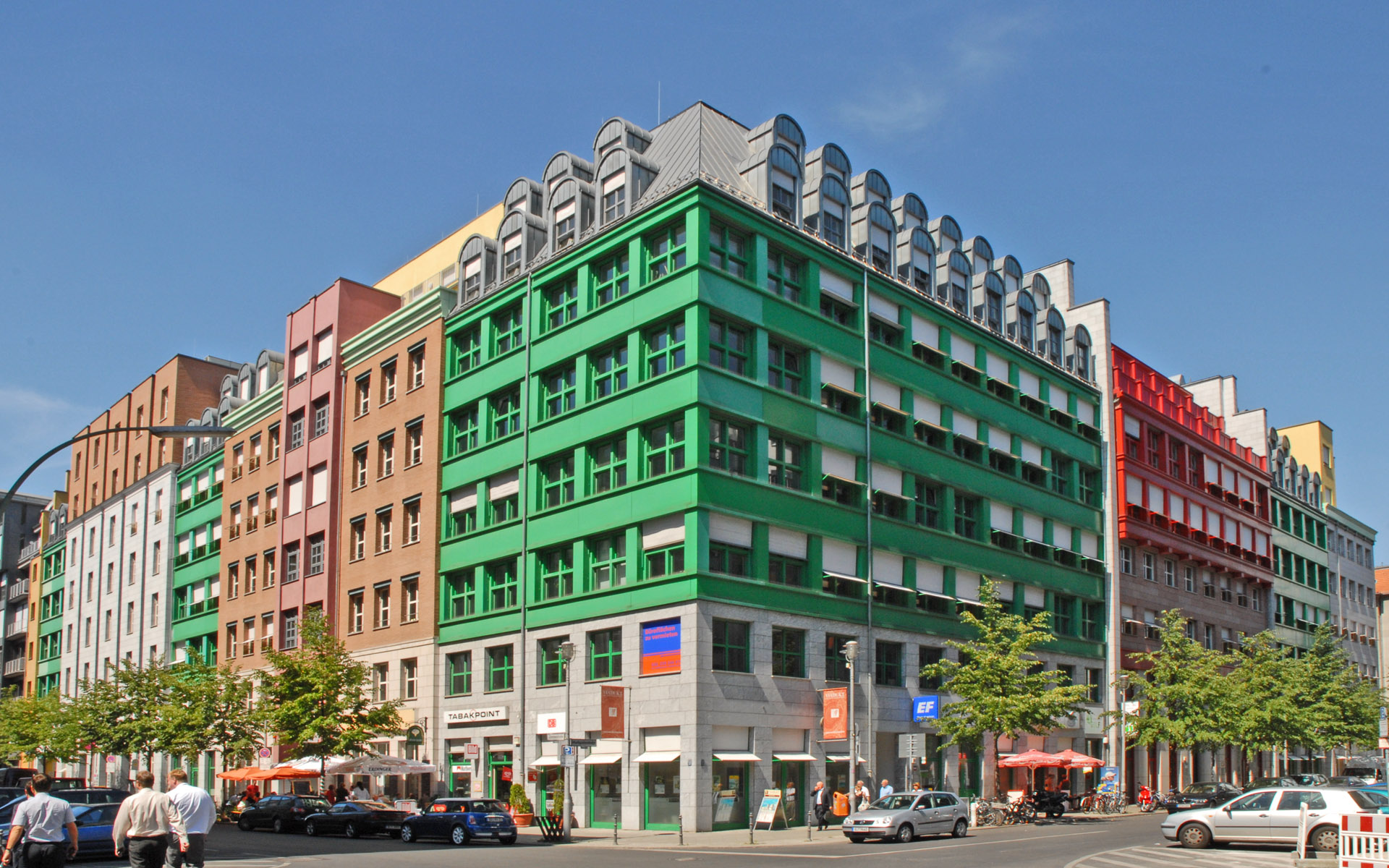
Quartier Schützenstrasse, Berlin, (1996) designed by Aldo Rossi

=== Postmodern architecture ===
Postmodern architecture has seen some revival in the Palazzo style, in greatly simplified and eclectic forms. The Italian architect Aldo Rossi has designed a number of Palazzo style buildings, including Hotel Il Palazzo in Fukuoka, Japan, (1989) which combines elements of a typical palazzo facade, including projecting cornice, with the intense red found in Japanese traditional architecture, and the green of patinated bronze. In 1996 Rossi designed a building complex on a large corner block in the Schützenquartier, Berlin, and previously occupied by a section of the Berlin Wall. Rossi's study of the architecture of the city led him to construct a single building with the appearance of multiple structures, of varying widths, designs and colours, many of which have elements of Palazzo architecture.

== Characteristics ==
The characteristic appearance of a Palazzo style building is that it draws on the appearance of an Italian palazzo or town house such as those found in Florence and along the Grand Canal in Venice. The style is usually Renaissance Revival but may be Romanesque or, more rarely, Italian Gothic. The facade is cliff-like, without any large projecting portico or pediment. There are several storeys with regular rows of windows which are generally differentiated between levels, and sometimes have pediments that are alternately triangular and segmental. The facade is symmetrical and usually has some emphasis around its centrally placed portal. The basement or ground floor is generally differentiated in the treatment of its masonry, and is often rusticated. The corners of early-19th-century examples generally have quoins or, in 20th-century buildings, there is often some emphasis that gives visual strength to the corners. Except in some Postmodern examples, there is always emphasis on the cornice, which may be very large and overhang the street. All public faces of the building are treated in a similar manner, the main difference being in the decoration of doors.

=== Palazzo style buildings ===
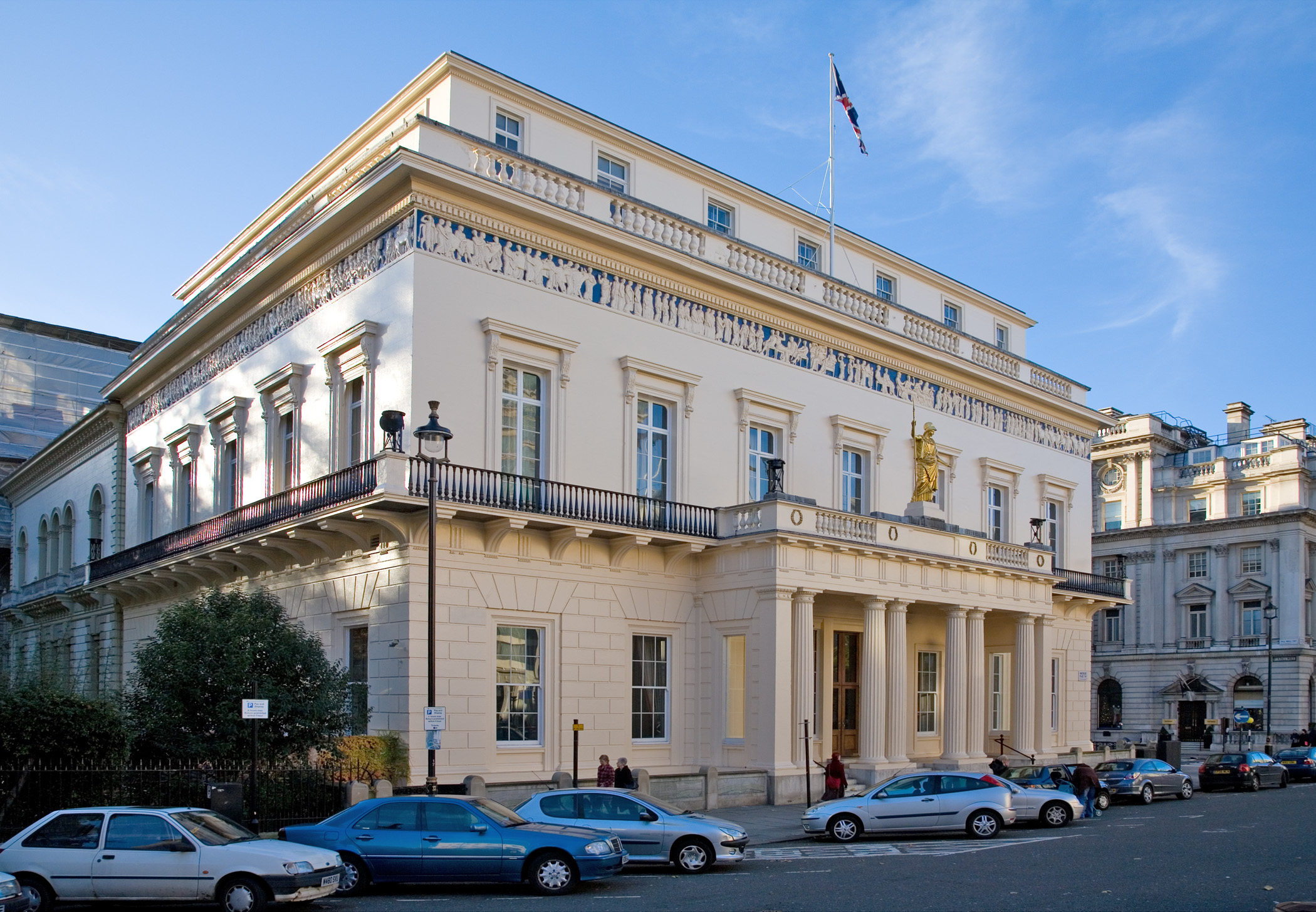
The Athenaeum Club, London, by Decimus Burton early 19th century

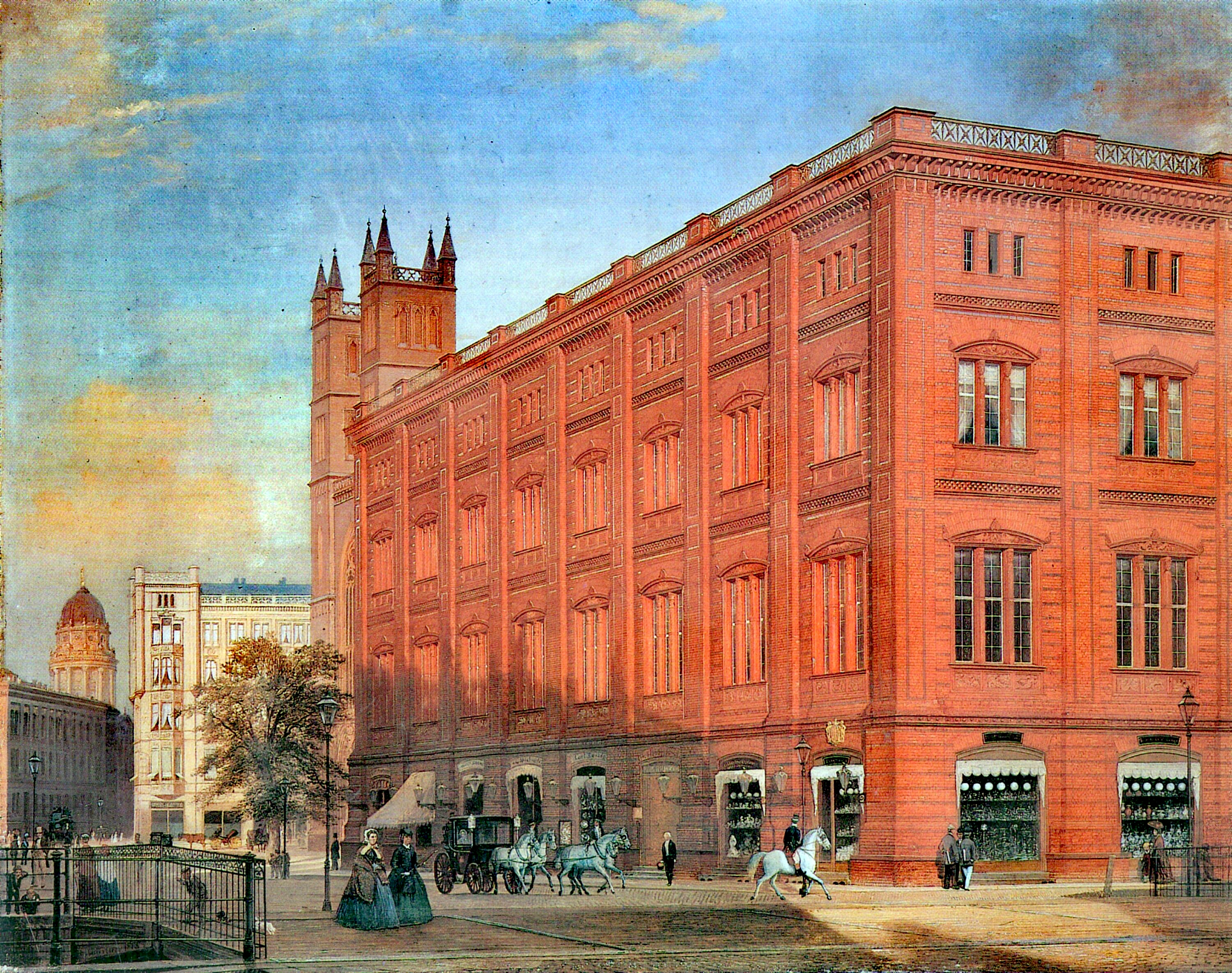
Bauakademie, Berlin by Karl Friedrich Schinkel, (1832–36), demolished 1962

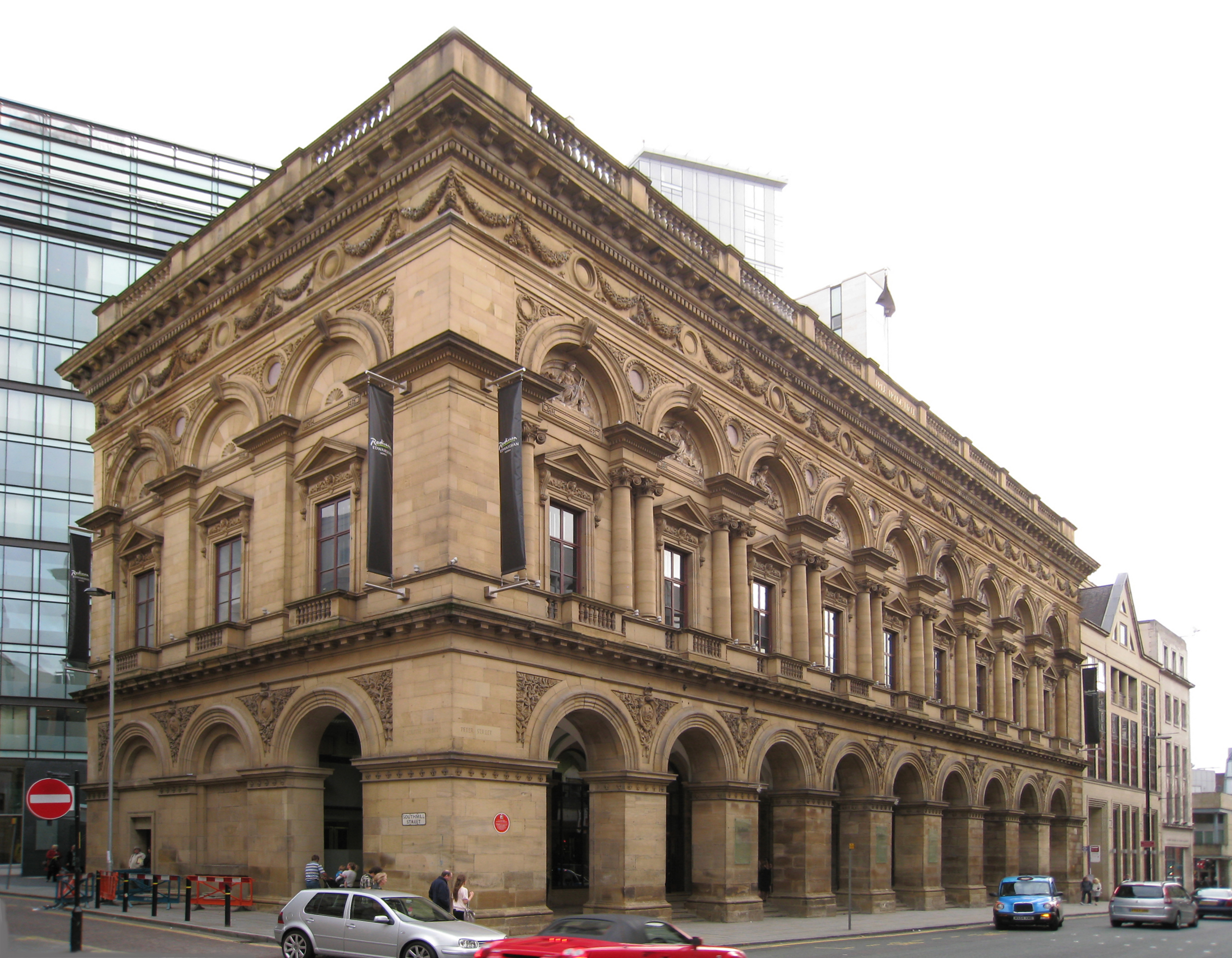
The Free Trade Hall, Manchester, a Venetian-style building by Edward Walters, (1853)

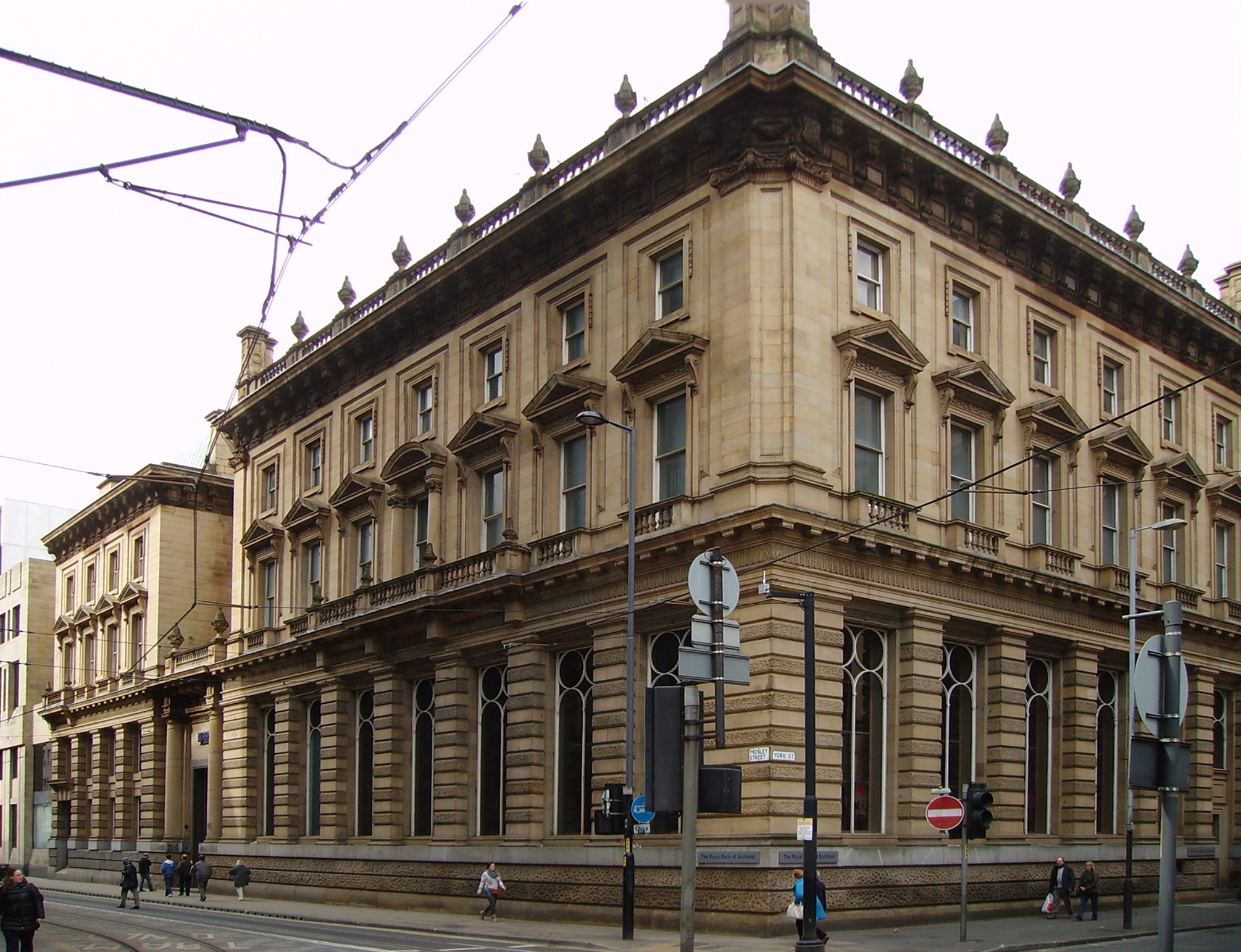
38 and 42 Mosley Street, Manchester, Edward Walters (1862)

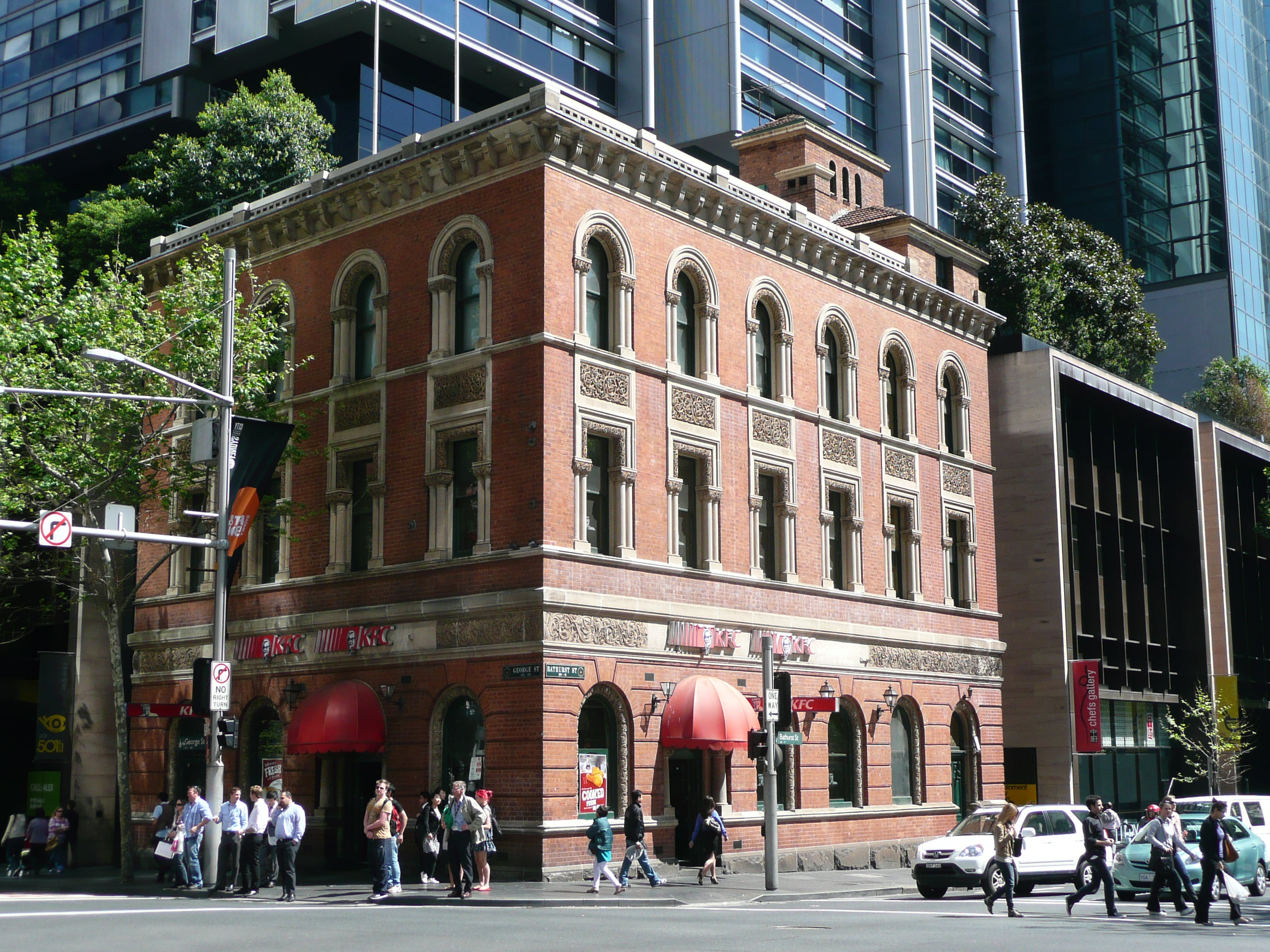
Former Bank of New South Wales, George Street, Sydney, late 19th century

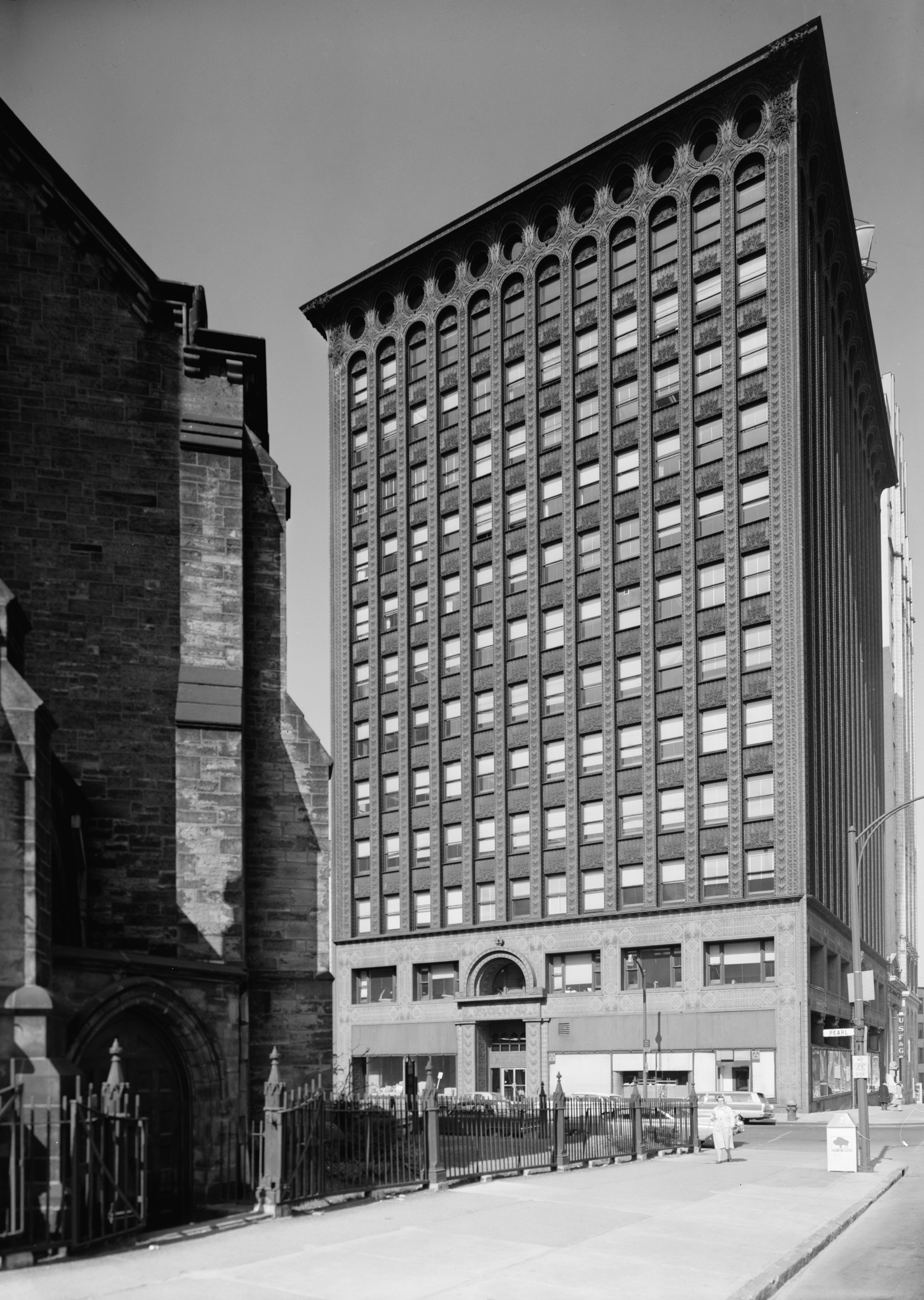
The Guaranty Building, Buffalo, US, (1894) by Louis Sullivan

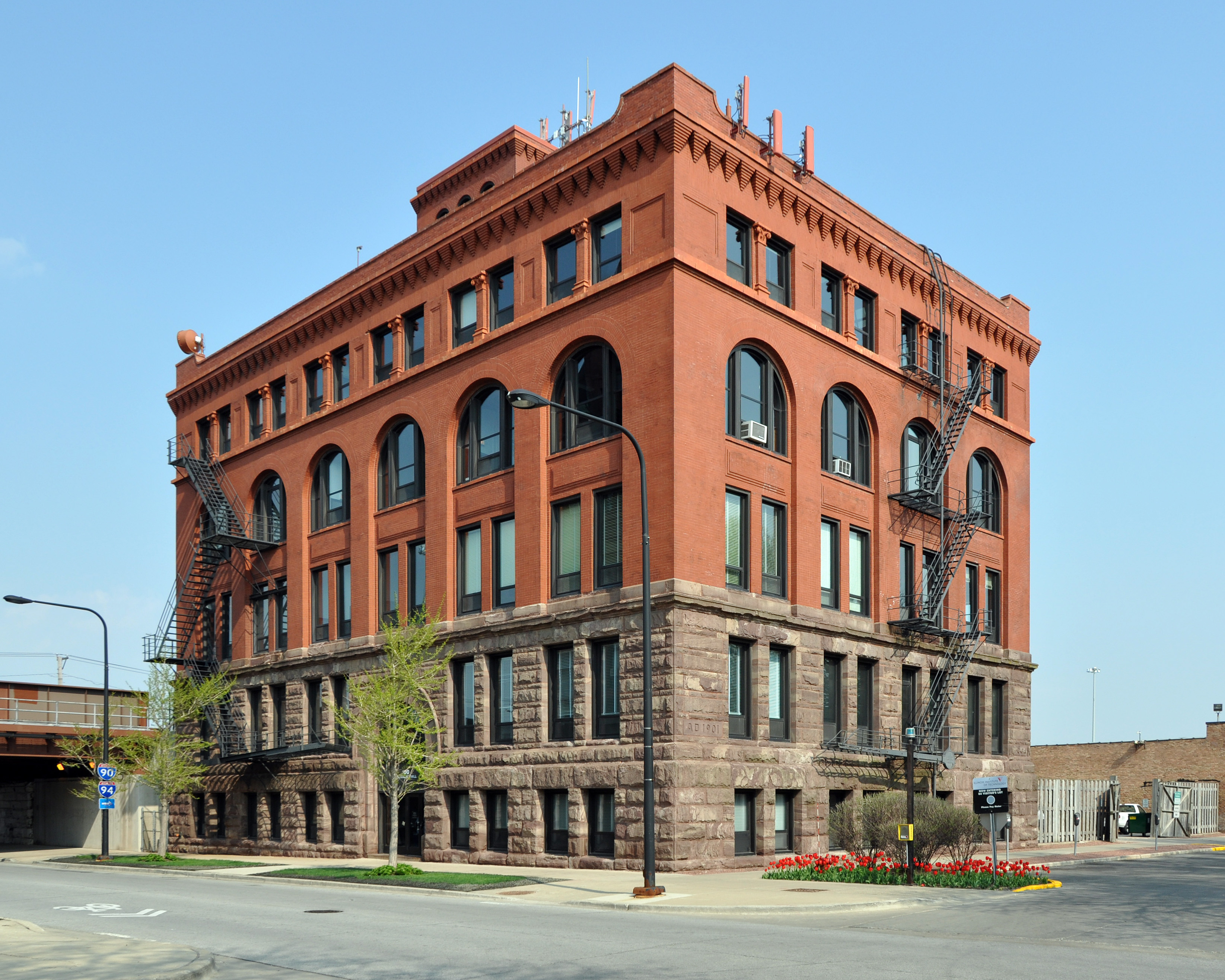
The Machinery Hall at Illinois Institute of Technology, Chicago, by C. V. Kerr of Patten & Fisher (1901)

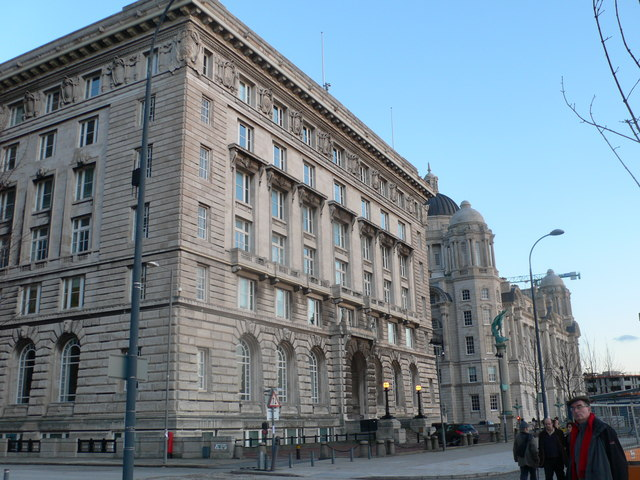
The former Cunard Building, Liverpool (1914–17) designed by William Edward Willink and Philip Coldwell Thicknesse

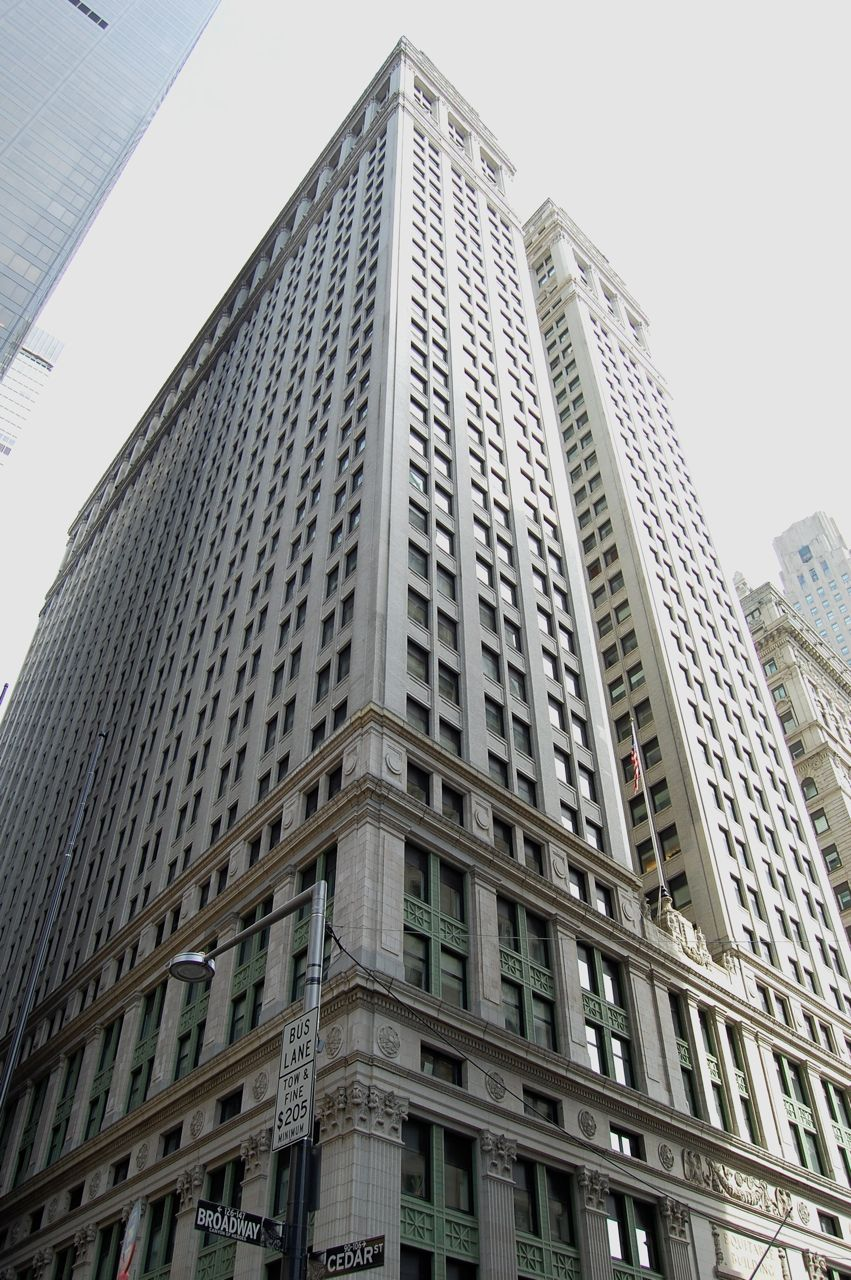
The Equitable Building Manhattan, (1915) by Ernest R. Graham

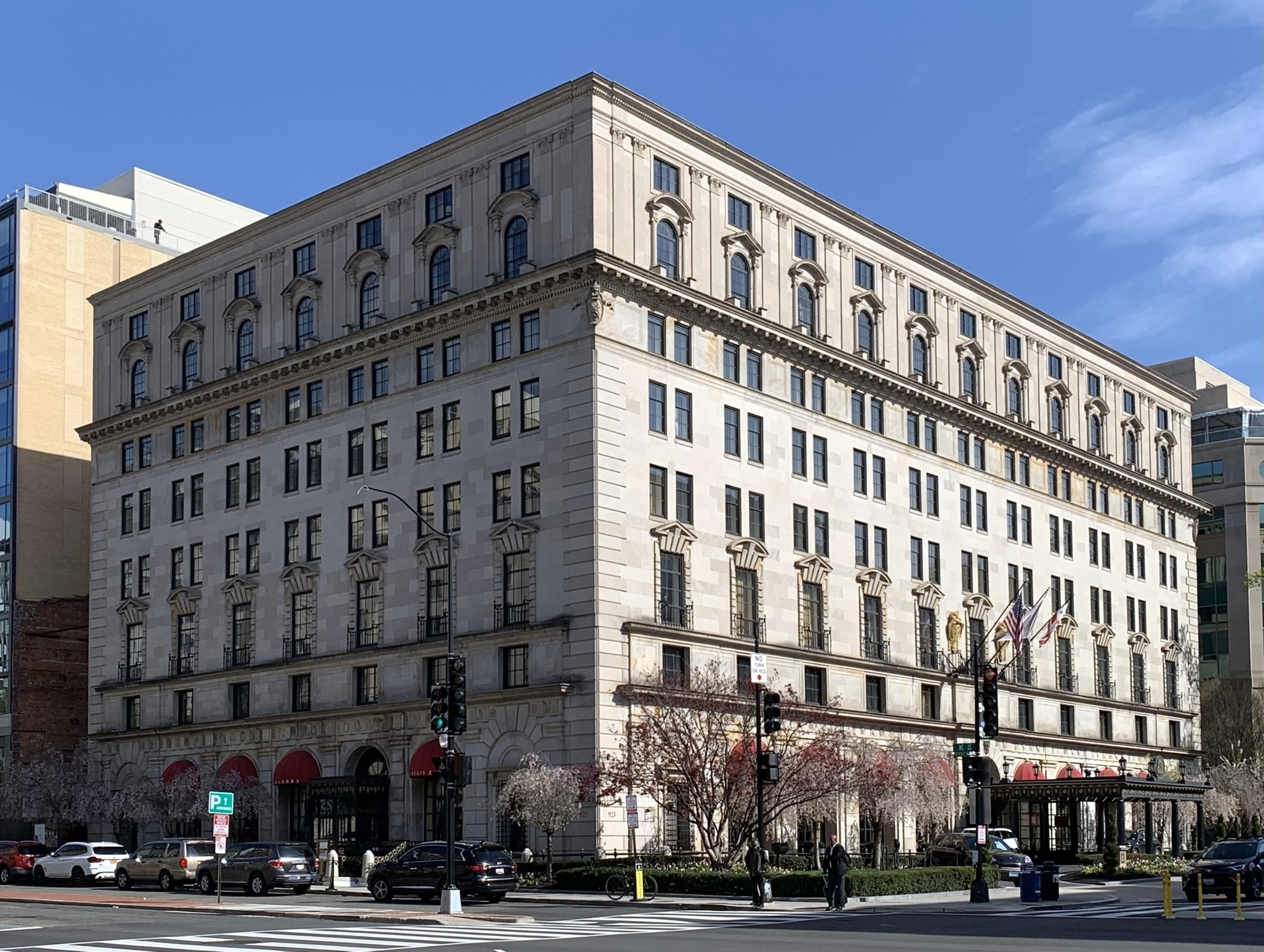
The Carlton Hotel, now known as The St. Regis, was designed by Mihran Mesrobian in 1926.

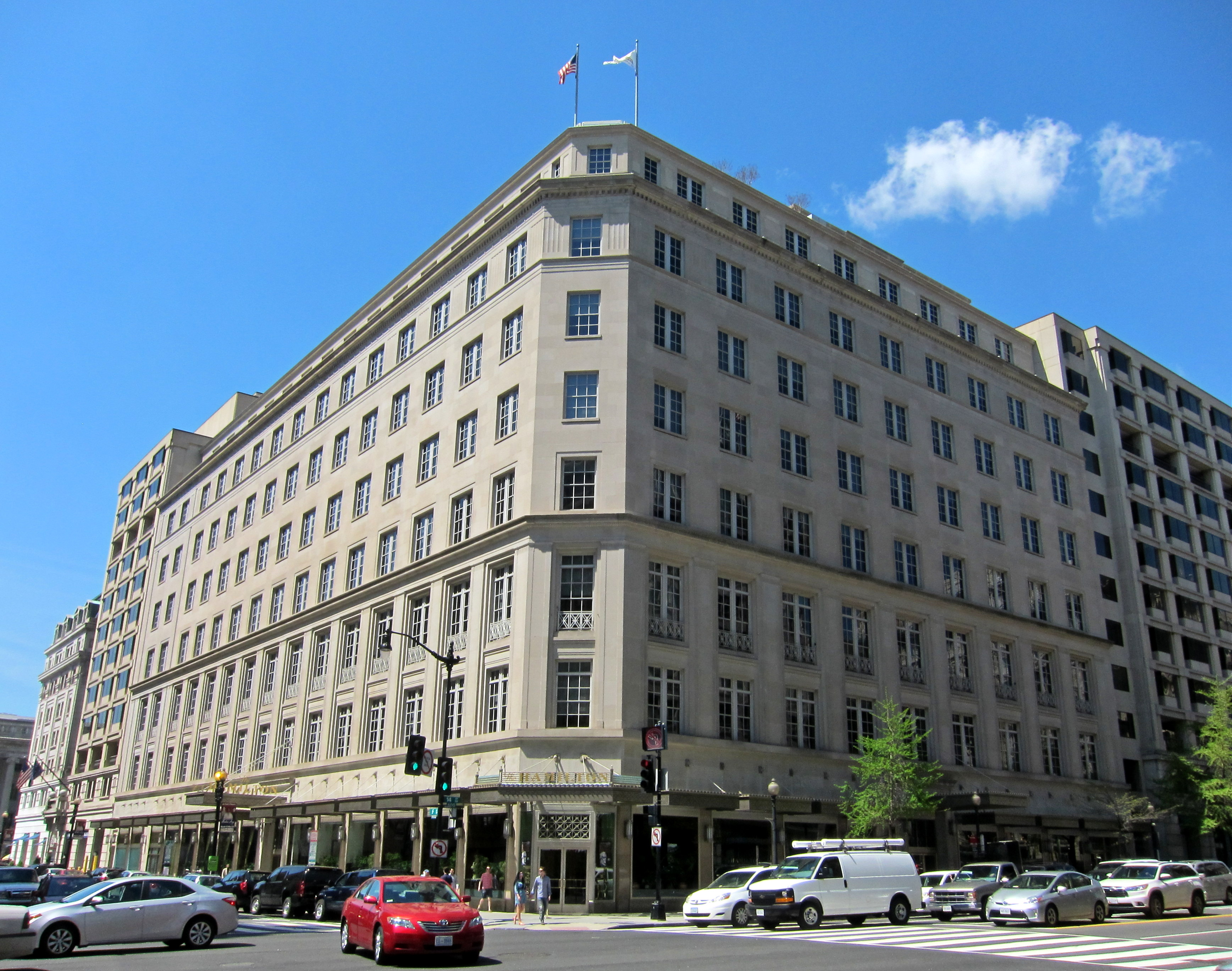
Former Garfinckel's Department Store, Washington D.C. (1929), Starrett & van Vleck

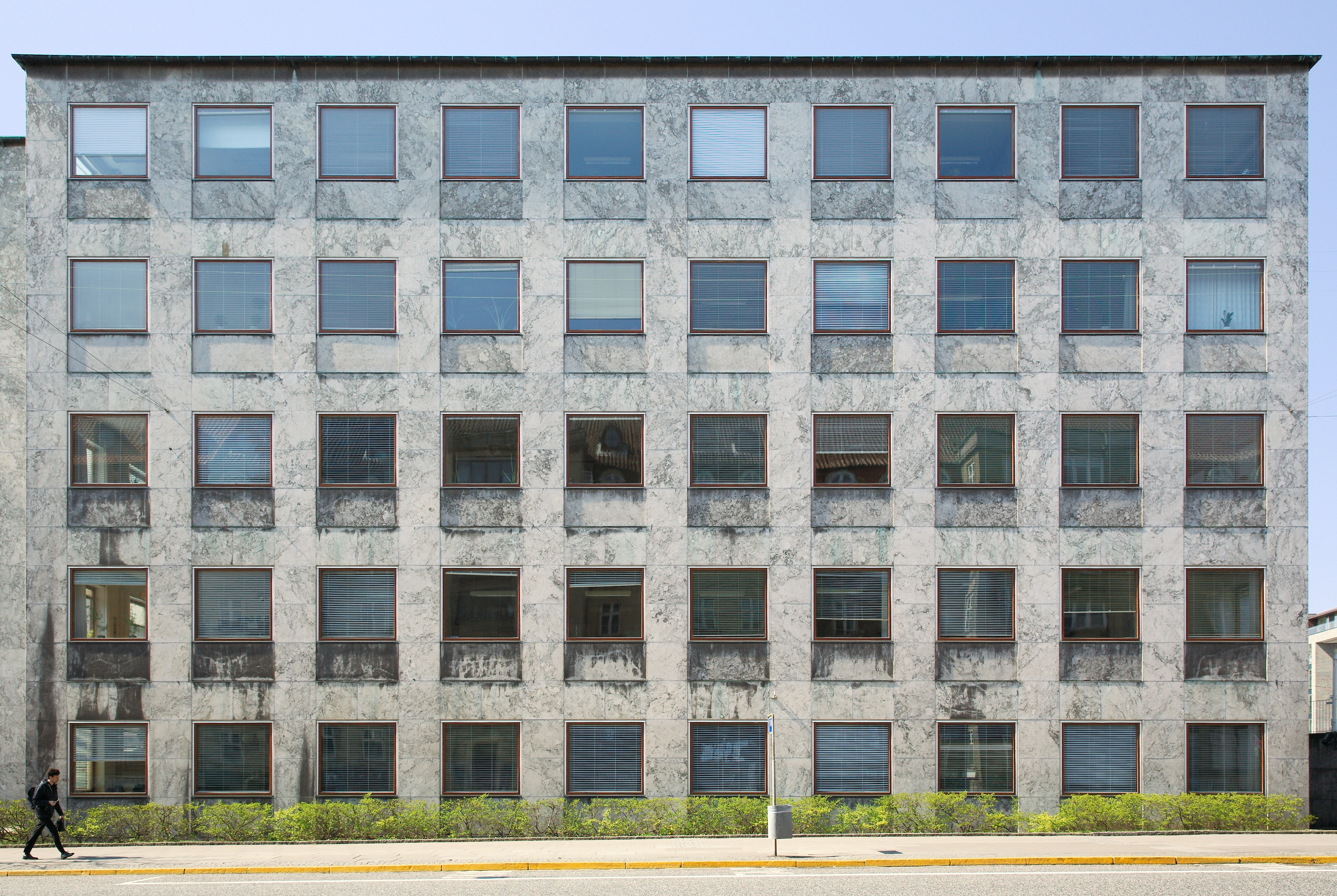
Aarhus City Hall (1941) Arne Jacobsen and Erik Møller

== See also ==
- List of architectural styles
- Richardson Romanesque
- Chicago school (architecture)
