= 38 and 42 Mosley Street =

Listed building in Manchester, England

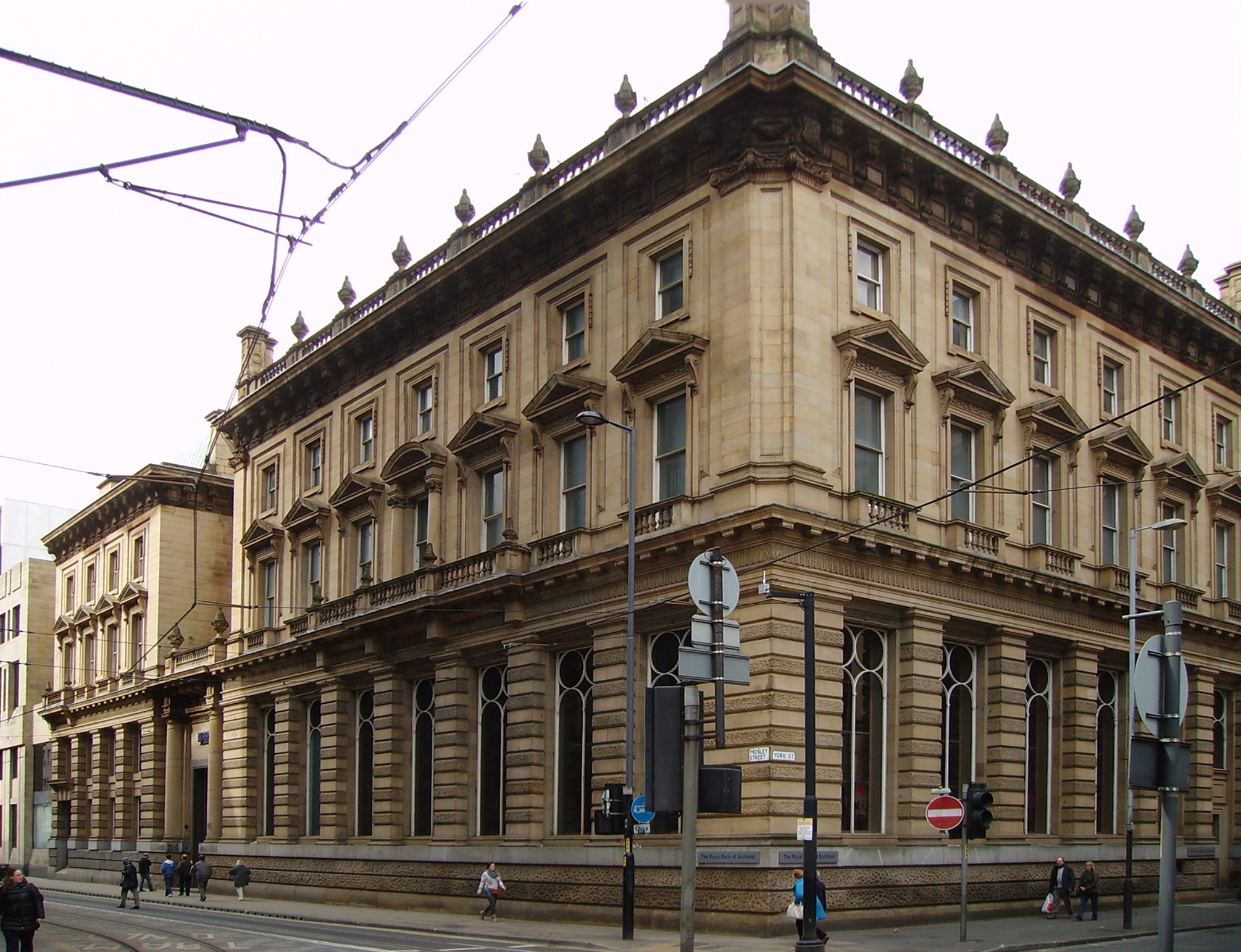
- 38 and 42 Mosley Street in 2011

- Location within Greater Manchester
- Former names: Royal Bank of Scotland
- Alternative names: Bond

General information
- Status: Converted to offices
- Architectural style: Italian palazzo style
- Location: Mosley Street, Manchester, England
- Year built: 1862
- Renovated: c. 1880 and 1975 (extended)
- Client: Manchester and Salford Bank
- Owner: Bruntwood

Technical details
- Material: Ashlar, slate
- Floor count: 4
- Floor area: 28,000 sq ft (2,600 m^{2})

Design and construction
- Architects: Edward Walters (1862); Barker and Ellis (c. 1880)
- Designations

Listed Building – Grade II*
- Official name: Royal Bank of Scotland
- Designated: 25 February 1952
- Reference no.: 1220165

Other information
- Public transit: Piccadilly Gardens tram stop

Website
- Official website

38 and 42 Mosley Street (officially listed as the Royal Bank of Scotland) are adjoining former Victorian bank buildings in Manchester, England. Originally constructed between 1862 and about 1880 for the Manchester and Salford Bank, they were designed initially by Edward Walters and later extended by Barker and Ellis to form a prominent corner block at Mosley Street and York Street. The premises passed through successive banking mergers, were designated Grade II* in 1952, and were occupied by the Royal Bank of Scotland until 2020. Following restoration, they reopened in 2023 as 'Bond', now used as office space, with a restaurant opening in the former banking hall in 2025.

== History ==
The building was constructed in 1862 for the Manchester and Salford Bank, according to its official listing, and the original block was described as the "last great work" of Edward Walters. The Manchester and Salford Bank was already established at its first branch at 10 Mosley Street, on the corner with Marble Street, before relocating to the larger premises at 38 Mosley Street. An extension at 42 Mosley Street, undertaken around 1880, was carried out by Walters' successors, Barker and Ellis. The addition was planned to be architecturally complementary to the original building and to accommodate the increased office needs of the expanding head‑office workforce.

In 1890 the Manchester and Salford Bank merged with Williams Deacon's Bank and adopted the name Williams Deacon and Manchester and Salford Bank. The head office moved to London at that point, although the business continued to be run from Manchester, and in 1901 the name was shortened to Williams Deacon's Bank Ltd.

On 25 February 1952, the building was designated a Grade II* listed structure.

In 1958 the bank bought the plot next to the Mosley Street premises, and two years later work began on a new headquarters. The resulting eight‑storey building, designed by Harry S. Fairhurst & Son, had a modern appearance with granite and marble cladding. A tunnel was also built beneath Mosley Street to link the new structure directly to the basement of 38 Mosley Street.

In 1970 the site was included within the newly designated Upper King Street conservation area.

It was occupied in 2001 by the Royal Bank of Scotland; they vacated in 2020 and the building underwent a restoration by owners Bruntwood before reopening in 2023 and being rebranded as 'Bond', now used as office space.

In April 2025, a 200-seater restaurant and bar called The Cut & Craft opened in the former banking hall.

== Architecture ==
The building is faced in rusticated stone with slate roofs and has a rectangular plan on an end‑of‑block site, with a gateway structure on the left and an additional block beyond it. It is designed in an Italian palazzo style. The original section is three storeys and seven bays, with a heavy stone base, a tall ground floor marked by banded piers and a cornice that supports balustraded balconies at first‑floor level, pilasters on the upper storeys including Ionic pilasters at the corners, and a large bracketed cornice with a balustraded parapet topped by urns.

The ground floor has large plate‑glass windows with geometric framing. The first floor has sash windows with pedimented surrounds, the central one set on columns with a segmental pediment. The second floor has shorter sash windows with moulded surrounds. The return elevation on York Street has six bays in the same style.

To the left is a single‑storey gateway with Tuscan columns, large brackets beneath a prominent cornice, and a balustraded parapet with urns. Beyond this, the extension is three storeys and four bays, designed to match the original block.

The interior contains a "very fine banking hall with columns and coffered ceiling". An extension of 1975 "palely follow(s) the nineteenth century rhythms".

== See also ==
- Grade II* listed buildings in Greater Manchester
- Listed buildings in Manchester-M2

== Bibliography ==
- Hartwell, Clare (2001). Manchester. Pevsner Architectural Guides. London: Penguin. ISBN 0-14-071131-7.
