= Mosley Street =

Street in Manchester, United Kingdom

Coordinates: 53.47948°N 2.24112°W

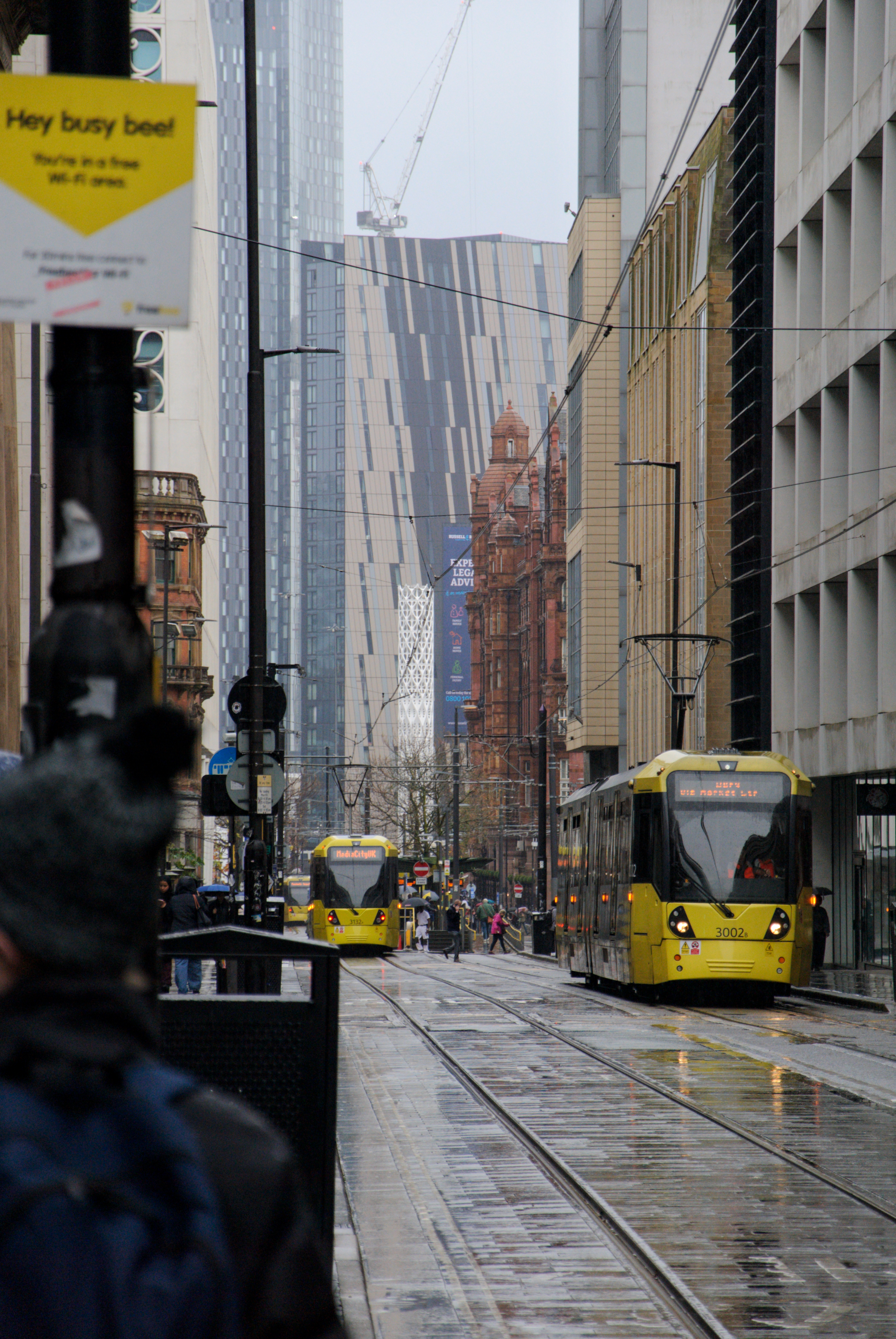
Looking down Mosley Street towards St Peter’s Square taken in November 2025

Mosley Street is a street in Manchester, England. It runs between its junction with Piccadilly Gardens and Market Street to St Peter's Square. Beyond St Peter's Square it becomes Lower Mosley Street. It is the location of several Grade II and Grade II* listed buildings.

Mosley Street tram stop was located near Piccadilly Gardens. In 2009, the tram lines on Mosley Street were reconstructed. Historically buses used Mosley Street en route to Piccadilly Gardens, however the services were rerouted along Portland Street in 2011. The street is now used by Metrolink trams and no cars are permitted on the street, although emergency service vehicles can still use the road and traffic signals at junctions remain in operational. The tram stop closed on 17 May 2013.

== History ==
The streets in the neighbourhood were laid in the 1780s and by the early 19th century Mosley Street was the centre of the fashionable residential part of town with institutions such as the Portico Library and the Royal Manchester Institution. The street was named after Nicholas Mosley who in 1596 bought the manor of Manchester for £3,500. His father, Edward Mosley, already owned Hough End Hall, which was the manor house of Withington. The Mosley family sold their manorial rights to Manchester City Council for £200,000 in 1846. In the first quarter of the 19th century the street was home to Hugh Birley, Samuel Brooks and Nathan Mayer Rothschild.

The nature of the street changed after 1827, when a house on the corner of Market Street was converted into a hotel and rooms in its coach house on Back Mosley Street were used as a warehouse. Several more warehouses were built after 1830 and large houses occupied by the gentry were speculatively converted to warehouses. The Congregational Chapel, in Cannon Street, was replaced by a chapel in Mosley Street and in 1848 the congregation moved again out of the centre of Manchester, to the chapel in Cavendish Street, Chorlton on Medlock.

== Notable buildings ==
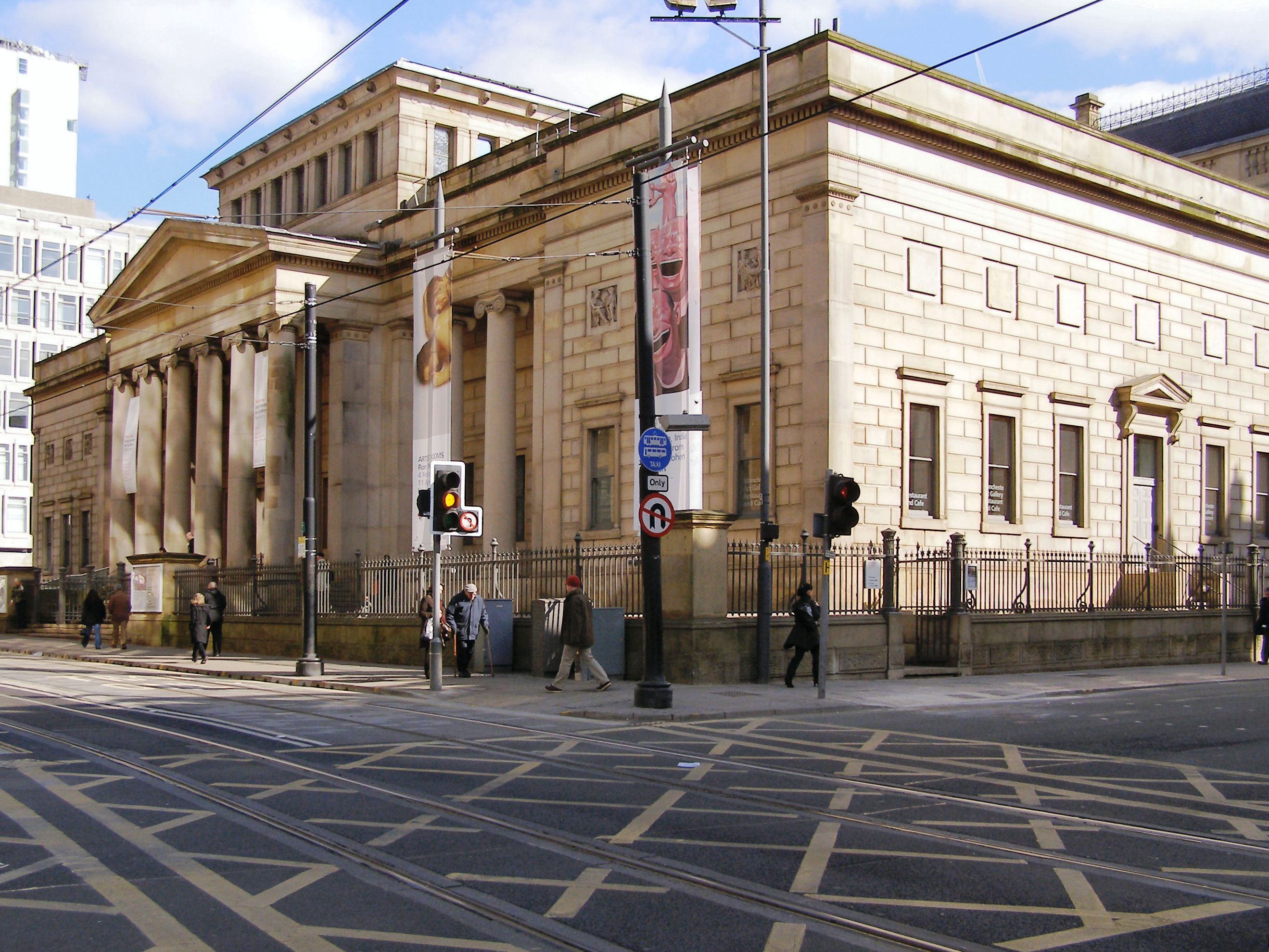
The Manchester Art Gallery

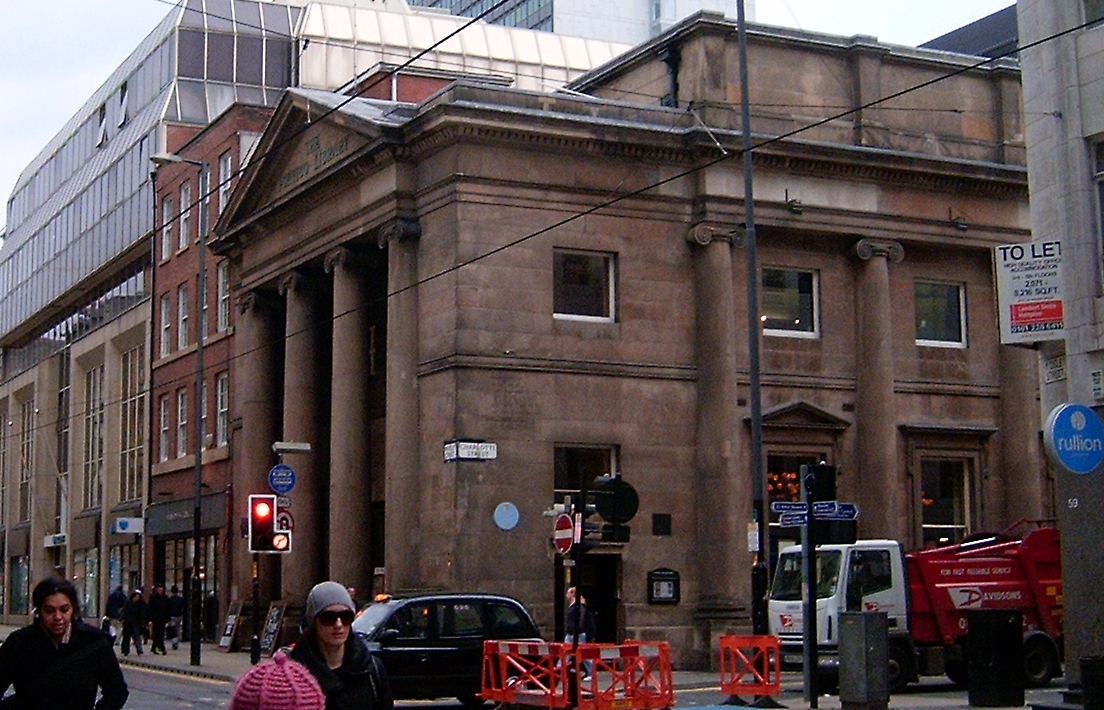
The Portico Library, on the corner of Charlotte Street

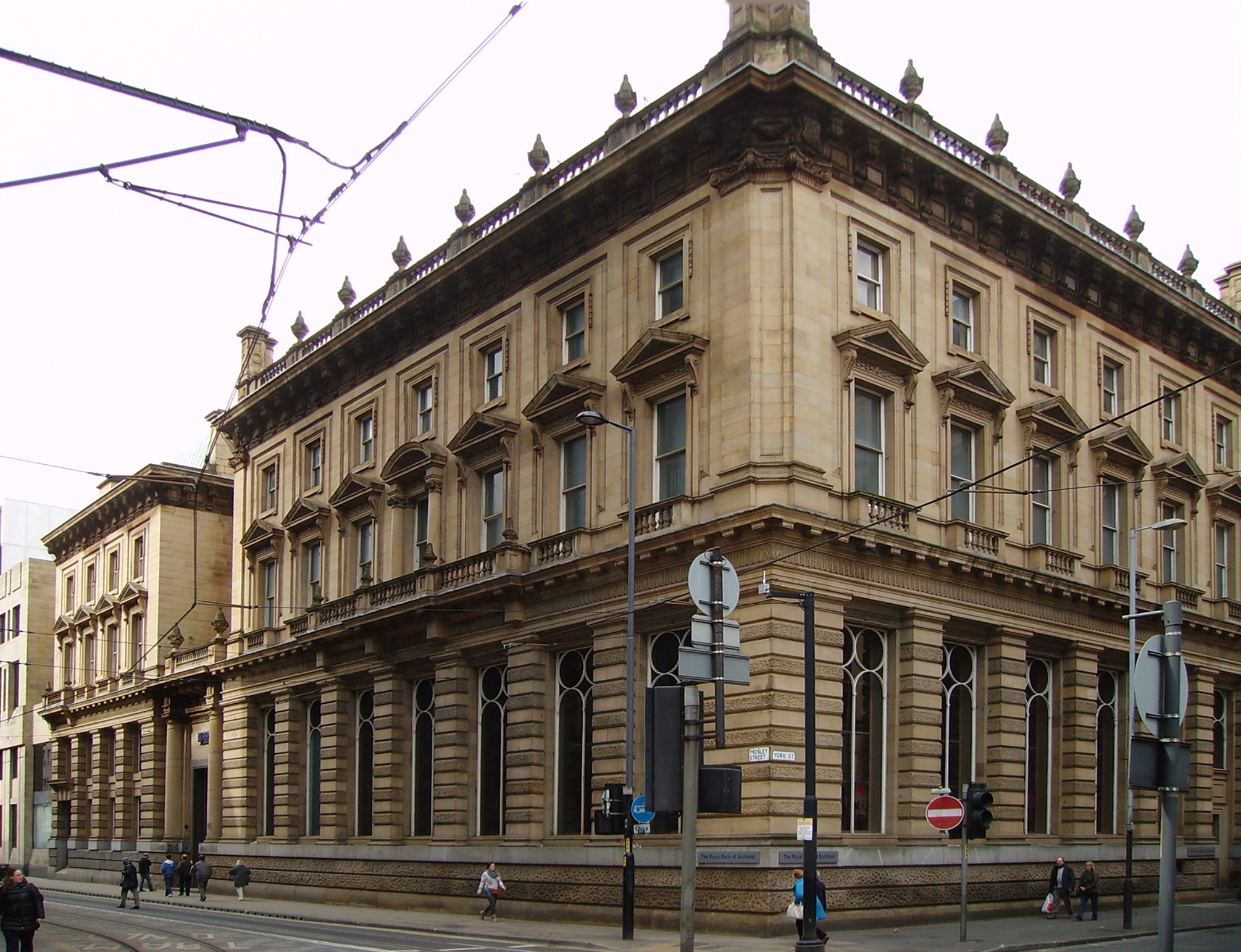
38 and 42 Mosley Street

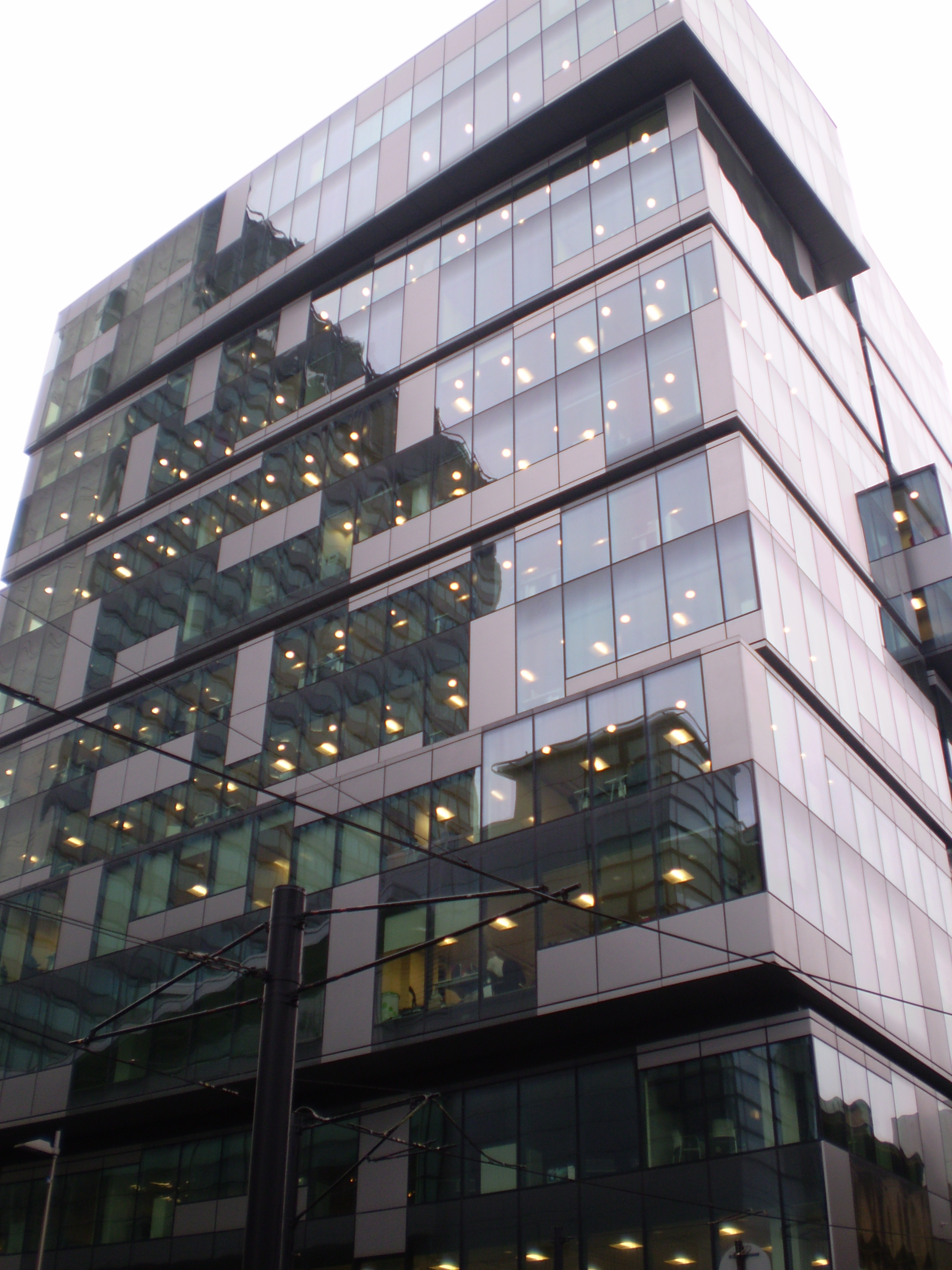
1 New York Street

East side

- The Portico Library on the corner of Charlotte Street was Manchester's first subscription library, built in the Classical style between 1802 and 1806 by Thomas Harrison of Chester. It was altered to become a bank and library in the 1920s and is now a public house and library. John Dalton described its location as in "the most elegant and retired street in town".
- The Royal Manchester Institution, now Manchester Art Gallery, was designed by Charles Barry and built between 1824 and 1835. It is built in the Greek Ionic style in rusticated sandstone ashlar. It is a Grade II* Listed building.
- Red brick offices and a trade warehouse (nos. 77, 77a; 14 & 16 Princess Street) built on the south corner of Princess Street around 1860–70 are occupied by a bank and offices and are Grade II listed.

West side

- At 10 Mosley Street, the bank, later Williams Deacon's and Bradford & Bingley was built in the Classical style for the Manchester and Salford Bank in 1836 by Richard Tattershall. It is constructed in sandstone ashlar under a slate roof and is Grade II listed.
- Shops and offices on a corner site at 12 Mosley Street were built in an eclectic neo-Gothic style between 1870 and 1880. The building has an iron frame clad in sandstone ashlar and a slate roof. It is Grade II listed.
- Harvest House at 14 and 16 Mosley Street was built as a textile warehouse for Richard Cobden in 1839 by Edward Walters in the Italian palazzo style in red brick in Flemish bond with sandstone dressings and is Grade II listed. It was later altered to become shops.
- The Grade II Colwyn Chambers at Mosley Street's junction with York Street was built for the Lancashire Mercantile Bank in 1898 by J. Gibbons Sankey and is now occupied by shops, a restaurant and offices.
- At 38 and 42 Mosley Street is a bank built in 1862 in the Italian palazzo style which was the last great work of Edward Walters. Now occupied by the Royal Bank of Scotland it was built for the Manchester and Salford Bank and extensions around 1880 were carried out by Walters' successors, Barker and Ellis. The bank is built in ashlar under slate roofs.

== See also ==
- List of streets and roads in Manchester
