= Castlefield Congregational Chapel =

Listed building in Manchester, England

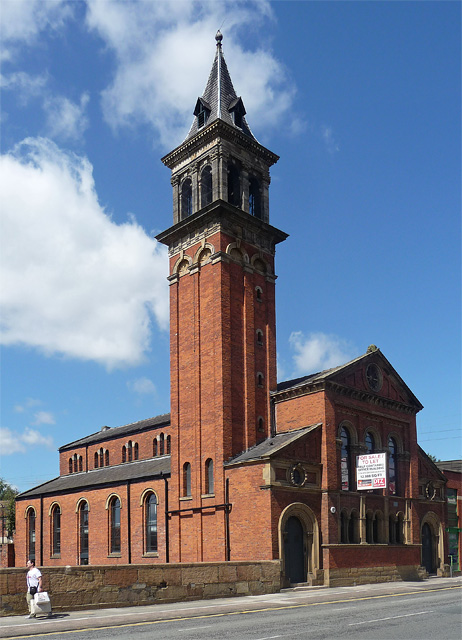

General information
- Architectural style: Red-brick Victorian
- Location: Castlefield, Manchester, England
- Coordinates: 53.47421°N 2.25262°W
- Completed: 1858

Design and construction
- Architect: Edward Walters
- Designations

Listed Building – Grade II
- Official name: Former Congregational Chapel
- Designated: 20 June 1988
- Reference no.: 1292311

Castlefield Congregational Chapel is a building located at 378 Deansgate in Manchester, England. The building originally opened as a Congregational chapel in 1858, and was designed by the local architect Edward Walters. It has been designated by English Heritage as a Grade II listed building. It is located in Castlefield, an Urban Heritage Park.

The building was converted to a sound recording studio in the 1980s and owned by Pete Waterman, best known for Stock Aitken Waterman. Rick Astley recorded "Never Gonna Give You Up" in the chapel. Waterman sold the building in 2006 and it has since been converted to offices.

== See also ==
- Listed buildings in Manchester-M3
