= Marshall Field's Wholesale Store =

Building in Chicago, Illinois

Coordinates: 41°52′44.5″N 87°38′4.2″W

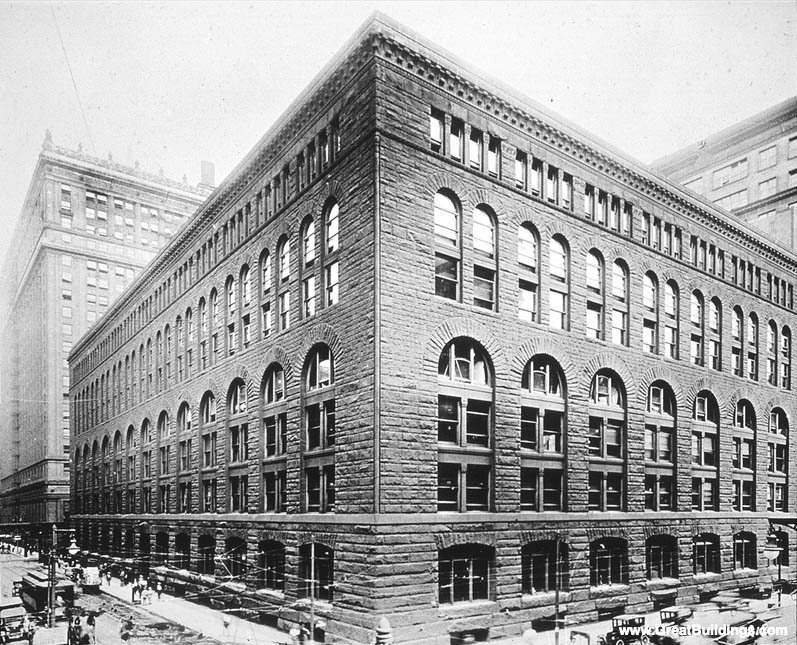
- Marshall Field's Wholesale Store, around 1910
- Interactive map of the Marshall Field's Wholesale Store area

General information
- Opened: 1887
- Demolished: 1930

Design and construction
- Architect: Henry Hobson Richardson

Marshall Field's Wholesale Store, Chicago, Illinois, sometimes referred to as the Marshall Field's Warehouse Store, was a landmark seven-story building designed by Henry Hobson Richardson. Intended for the wholesale business of Field's eponymously named department store, it opened on June 20, 1887, encompassing the block bounded by Quincy, Franklin, Adams and Wells Streets, near the location of the Chicago Board of Trade Building.

== Architecture ==
The building was commissioned in 1885 by legendary merchant Marshall Field. H. H. Richardson is renowned for his designs in the Romanesque revival style, to which he has given the name Richardsonian Romanesque. The Marshall Field Store demonstrates his ability to adapt this style to a modern commercial premises. The building was supported by an interior framing of wood and iron, and was clad in a rusticated exterior of stonework giving the appearance of an Italian Romanesque palazzo. The exterior design, in which the windows were contained by massive Romanesque arches, gave the impression of having four levels, but in fact there were seven floors and a sunken basement. The large arches allowed for thinner structural members between them and greater window space than if the windows were set into the solid masonry.

Marshall Field and Company closed the building in 1930 after the opening of the Merchandise Mart, then the world's largest building, which consolidated all company wholesale business under a single roof. The wholesale store was torn down later in that same year.

== See also ==
- Henry Hobson Richardson
- Palazzo style architecture
- American architecture
- Louis Sullivan
