= Edward Walters =

English architect

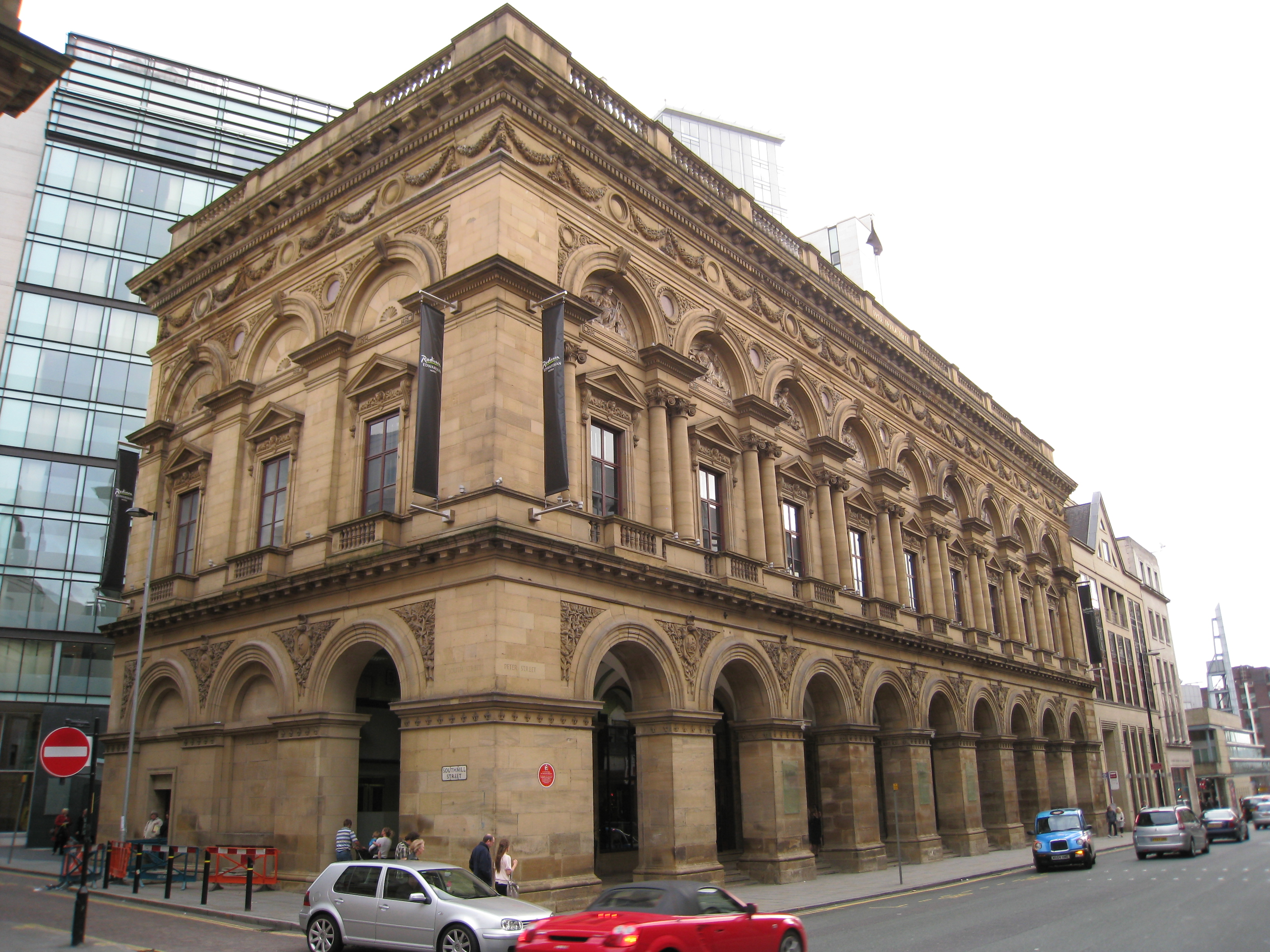
Free Trade Hall (Grade II*), 1856.

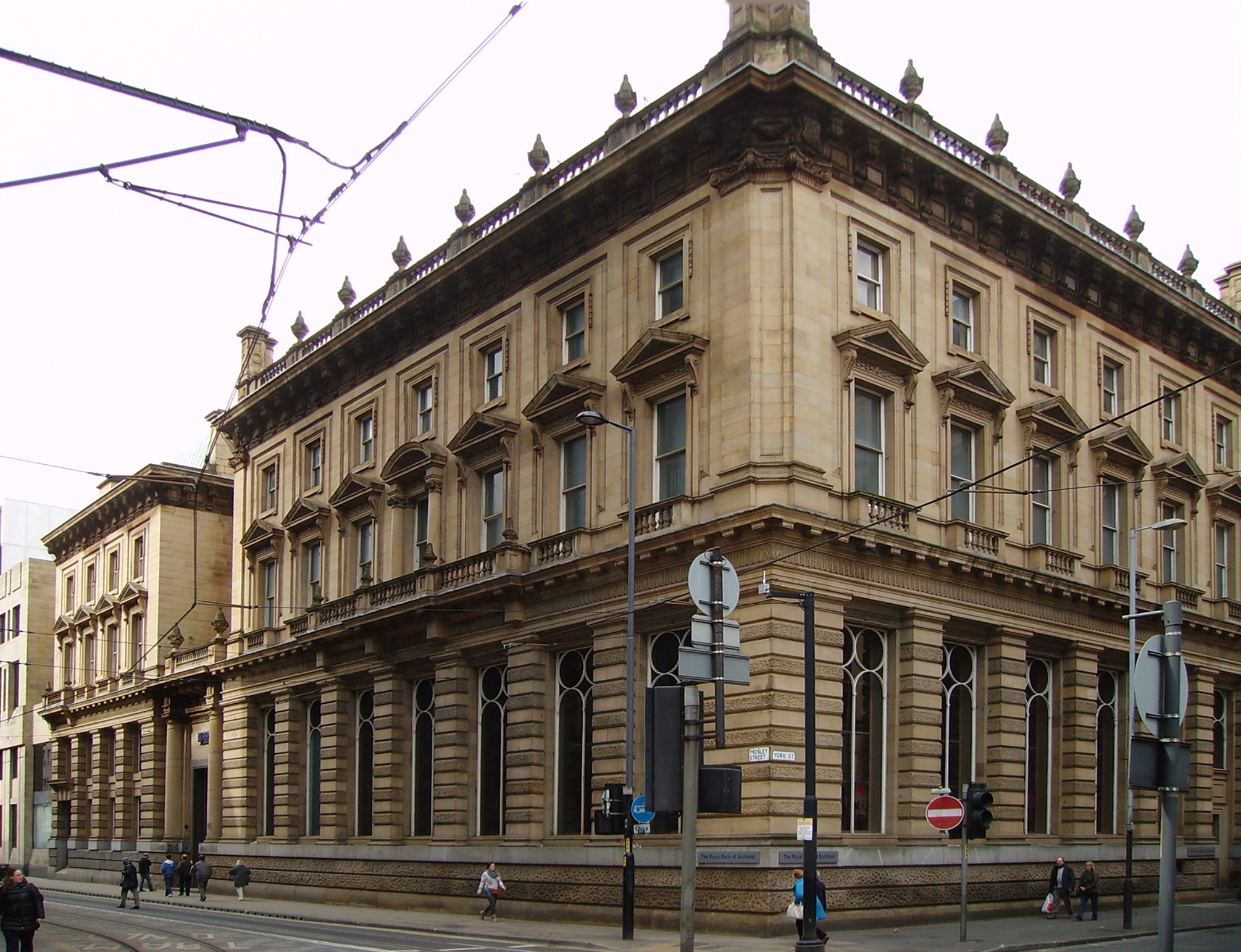
38 and 42 Mosley Street (Grade II*), 1880.

Edward Walters (December 1808, in Fenchurch Buildings, London – 22 January 1872, in 11 Oriental Place, Brighton) was an English architect.

== Life ==
Walters was the son of an architect who died young. He began his career in the office of Isaac Clarke, his father's former assistant, before going to work with Lewis Vulliamy and then Sir John Rennie. After superintending Rennie's military building work in Constantinople between 1832 and 1837, he returned to England to practise as an architect in the provinces. His practice was based at Manchester from 1839, where his most notable work was the Free Trade Hall, referred to as the "noblest monument in the Cinquecento style in England" by Nikolaus Pevsner.

Walters retired in 1865 and then travelled in Italy and England before his death in 1872. He never married and died without issue.

== Manchester works (selected) ==
- Harvest House at 14 and 16, Mosley Street was built as a textile warehouse for Richard Cobden in 1839 in red brick in Flemish bond with sandstone dressings the Italian palazzo style. It was later altered to become shops.
- Silas Schwabe's Warehouse (1845: demolished), Italian Renaissance Revival style
- The Firs, Fallowfield, was built for Joseph Whitworth in 1850.
- Brown & Son's Warehouse, 9 Portland Street (1851 to 1852: demolished), Italian Renaissance Revival style. "A splendid example of the Manchester warehouse of the mid-century".
- Four warehouses, south-east side of Piccadilly Gardens (1851-1858)
- Free Trade Hall (1855), in Peter Street, Italian Renaissance Revival style.
- Castlefield Congregational Chapel (1858) in Castlefield, Victorian red-brick
- 38 and 42 Mosley Street, the Manchester & Salford (later William Deacon's, now RBS) Bank, Mosley Street, Renaissance Revival style (1860).

== Other works ==
- Wycliffe Congregational Chapel, Stockport (1849)
- Bakewell railway station (1862)
