= City Arms =

Listed pub in Manchester, England

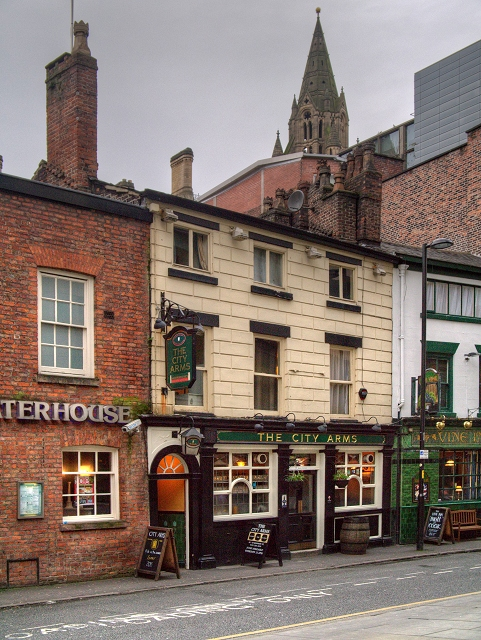
- The pub in 2014

General information
- Type: Public house (current; originally a townhouse)
- Location: 46–48 Kennedy Street, Manchester, England
- Coordinates: 53.4794°N 2.2429°W
- Year built: Late 18th century (probable)
- Renovated: c. 1900 (probable, altered)

Design and construction
- Designations

Listed Building – Grade II
- Official name: City Arms public house
- Designated: 3 October 1974
- Reference no.: 1197933

The City Arms is a Grade II listed public house on Kennedy Street in Manchester, England. It is housed within a former late 18th‑century townhouse that once formed part of a small terrace. Standing immediately beside the Grade II-listed Vine Inn, the building was remodelled around 1900 and later altered throughout the 20th century, retaining notable 1930s interior features and additions made during its time as a Tetley "Festival Ale House" in the 1970s.

== History ==
The building originated as a townhouse, probably constructed in the late 18th century, according to its official listing. It appears on early Ordnance Survey mapping of central Manchester as part of a short terrace on Kennedy Street, with its footprint remaining broadly consistent through the 19th century. The pub stands immediately beside the Vine Inn, another Grade II-listed public house, which was probably built around the same time.

The City Arms underwent a refurbishment around 1900 followed by periodic internal alterations during the 20th century. The rear saloon features mainly 1930s décor, including an Art Deco fireplace, dado panelling, and baffles. Its designation as a Tetley "Festival Ale House" in the 1970s led to further alterations, including the addition of the bar‑back and panelling in the front bar. On 3 October 1974, the pub was designated a Grade II listed building.

The City Arms has appeared regularly in the Good Beer Guide for many years.

== Architecture ==
The building is constructed from brick with a scored stucco finish and has an irregular layout of two rooms. It has three storeys and three front windows. The ground floor features wooden pilasters around the main entrance, two large rectangular windows with early-20th‑century glazing, and a round‑headed doorway to the left. The first floor has sash windows, all fitted with 20th‑century folding canopies, and the second floor has square two‑light casement windows. There are gable‑end chimneys.

== See also ==
- Listed buildings in Manchester-M2
- Listed pubs in Manchester
