= Vine Inn, Manchester =

Listed pub in England

Vine Inn
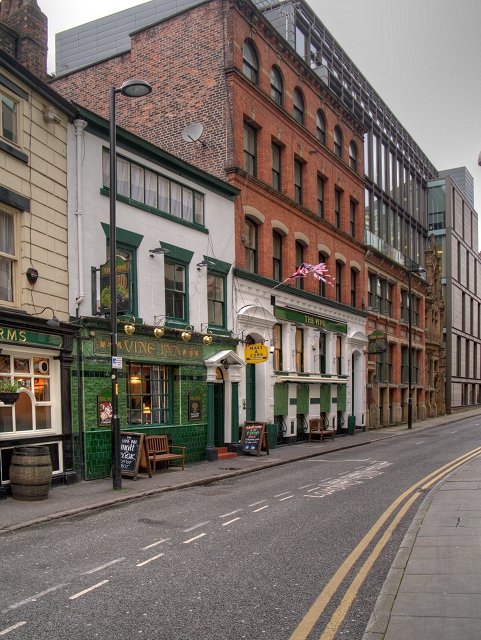
- The pub in 2014

General information
- Type: Public house (current; originally a townhouse and part of a warehouse)
- Location: 42–44 Kennedy Street, Manchester, England
- Coordinates: 53.4796°N 2.2426°W
- Years built: No. 46: late 18th century (probable); Nos. 42 and 44: c. 1860–1870

Design and construction
- Designations

Listed Building – Grade II
- Official name: Vine Inn (46 Kennedy Street)
- Designated: 3 October 1974
- Reference no.: 1282982

Listed Building – Grade II
- Official name: Vine Inn (42 and 44 Kennedy Street)
- Designated: 6 June 1994
- Reference no.: 1197932

Website
- vineinnmanchester.co.uk

The Vine Inn is a Grade II listed public house on Kennedy Street in Manchester, England. Although now a single pub, it occupies two separately listed structures: a former late 18th‑century townhouse at No. 46 and part of a former late 19th-century textile warehouse at Nos. 42 and 44. It stands beside another Grade II-listed public house, the City Arms.

== History ==
The building at 46 Kennedy Street originated as a townhouse, probably constructed in the late 18th century, with Nos. 42 and 44 originating as a textile warehouse built around 1860 to 1870, according to their official listings. No. 46 was in use as a public house by the 1880s.

The buildings appear on early Ordnance Survey mapping of central Manchester as part of a short terrace on Kennedy Street, with their footprints remaining broadly consistent through the 19th century.

The connection between No. 46 and the former warehouse at Nos. 42 and 44 appears to have been created during the 1970s. On 3 October 1974, No. 46 was designated a Grade II listed building, with Nos. 42 and 44 receiving the same grading almost two decades later, on 6 June 1994. The Vine Inn stands immediately beside the City Arms at 48 Kennedy Street, another Grade II-listed pub.

== Architecture ==
The building at No. 46 is constructed of brick, with green glazed tiling on the ground floor, scored-stucco upper floors, and a slate roof. It has three storeys and cellars. The ground floor has a round‑headed doorway to the right and an altered window to the left, set within a tiled frontage with a lettered frieze. The first floor has four‑pane sash windows with modern folding canopies, and the second floor has a long eight‑light window with later glazing. A gable‑end chimney rises on the left side.

The building at Nos. 42 and 44 is built of red brick in Flemish bond, with a white-painted stucco ground floor, sandstone dressings, and a slate roof. It has four storeys and a basement, with a symmetrical six‑window front. Each end of the ground floor has a shallow-arched doorway, and the basement and ground‑floor windows are the same height; the basement ones now partly tiled above bowed railings. The ground‑floor windows are plain sashes. On the upper floors, the first‑floor windows have shallow arched stone heads, the second‑floor windows have flat arches with keystones, and the third‑floor windows are round‑headed with imposts and keystones.

== See also ==
- Listed buildings in Manchester-M2
- Listed pubs in Manchester
