= Listed buildings in Manchester-M2 =

Manchester is a city in Northwest England. The M2 postcode area of the city includes part of the city centre, including the Central Retail District. The postcode area contains 114 listed buildings that are recorded in the National Heritage List for England. Of these, five are listed at Grade I, the highest of the three grades, 16 are at Grade II*, the middle grade, and the others are at Grade II, the lowest grade.

The area is important not only for retail, but also for commercial and civic functions. The majority of the listed buildings date from the early 19th to the early 20th century, and many of them are elaborately designed and decorated, reflecting the economic prosperity of the city during this time. The architectural styles employed include Classical, Greek Revival, Renaissance, Gothic, Romanesque, Venetian Gothic, Baroque, Queen Anne, and Edwardian Baroque. Some of the buildings originated as warehouses that have been converted for other uses, and a number of these are in the style of an Italian palazzo. Most of the buildings are shops, offices, houses, banks, and civic and public buildings, Other buildings include churches, statues, tombs, monuments, public houses, clubs, a former railway station now an exhibition centre, a fountain, war memorials, two electricity junction boxes, and a pair of telephone kiosks.

== Key ==
Grade	Criteria
I	Buildings of exceptional interest, sometimes considered to be internationally important
II*	Particularly important buildings of more than special interest
II	Buildings of national importance and special interest

== Buildings ==
Name and location	Photograph	Date	Notes	Grade
56 King Street; 53.48110°N 2.24565°W		c. 1700	A house, later shops and an office, in stuccoed brick with a bracketed cornice. There are three storeys and three bays. On the ground floor are modern shop fronts, and above are sash windows with moulded architraves.	II
St Ann's Church; 53.48167°N 2.24580°W		1709–1712	The church, which was restored between 1887 and 1891 by Alfred Waterhouse, is in Classical style. It is built in Collyhurst sandstone with a hipped slate roof, and consists of a nave with an east apse and a west tower. The nave has two storeys, with pilasters that are fluted and Corinthian on the lower storeys, and plain above. The entrance has a square-headed doorway, a pedimented tetrastyle Corinthian doorcase with fluted columns, and a pilastered parapet. The windows are round-headed, with panelled aprons, moulded imposts and decorative keystones. The tower has four stages, rusticated clasping corner pilasters, an oculus, a clock face, and a balustraded parapet.	I
Former National Westminster Bank and railings 53.48127°N 2.24560°W		1736	A house later altered and used for other purposes, it is in red brick with sandstone dressings, a moulded eaves cornice, and a hipped slate roof. The main block has a double-depth plan, three storeys and a basement, and a symmetrical front of five bays. The basement windows have segmental heads with triple keystones, and in front of the basement area are railings on a low stone plinth. Steps lead up to the central doorway that has an architrave with a pediment and a fanlight. The windows are sashes with architraves and triple keystones. Flanking the central block are wings whose fronts have been replaced by glass with metal posts. Further to the right is a single-storey stone porch with a rusticated semicircular arch and a cornice on console brackets.	II
Deacon monument 53.48171°N 2.24552°W		Mid-18th century	The monument is to the north of the apse of St Ann's Church and is to the memory of Thomas Deacon and his wife. It is in sandstone, and consists of a tomb chest. This has a rectangular lid with a cross at the head and scrolled decoration at the foot, between which are inscriptions.	II
Allen monument 53.48158°N 2.24555°W		1773	The monument is to the south of the apse of St Ann's Church and is to the memory of Joseph Allen, his wife and his children. It is in sandstone with inscriptions, and consists of a tomb chest with raised side and end panels, and a plain lid.	II
16 St Ann's Square; 53.48225°N 2.24586°W		Late 18th century (probable)	A house, later a shop, in orange brick with sandstone dressings, a moulded sill band, a string course, and a prominent moulded cornice. There are four storeys and a symmetrical front of three bays. On the ground floor is a modern shop front, and above are sash windows with flat-arched heads, apart from the central window on the first floor, which has a moulded architrave and a cornice on consoles.	II
18 and 20 St Ann's Square; 53.48218°N 2.24590°W		Late 18th century (probable)	A house. later a restaurant, in stuccoed brick, with a gutter cornice, four storeys, and a symmetrical front of four bays. On the ground floor is a 20th-century restaurant front. On the first floor the windows have altered glazing and on the top two floors they are sashes with moulded architraves, those on the second floor having scallop crests. Between the first and second floors is a moulded frieze and a moulded sill band.	II
65–71 Princess Street; 53.47920°N 2.24313°W		Late 18th century (probable)	A row of four houses, later used for other purposes. They are in red brick on a plinth, with sandstone dressings and modillioned eaves. There are three storeys, cellars, and each house has three bays. No. 65 has an inserted shop front, and each of the other houses has a doorway with Tuscan pilasters, a fanlight, and an open pediment. The windows are sashes with flat-arched heads.	II
Boardman monument 53.48160°N 2.24554°W		Late 18th century (probable)	The monument is to the south of the apse of St Ann's Church and is to the memory of Joseph Boardman, his wife, and 13 children, It is in sandstone with inscriptions, and consists of a tomb chest with raised side and end panels, and a shouldered lid with a moulded edge.	II
City Arms public house 53.47938°N 2.24293°W		Late 18th century (probable)	Originally a house that was converted into a public house probably in about 1900. It is in stuccoed brick, and has three storeys and three bays. On the ground floor are wooden pilasters, a round-headed doorway on the left, and large rectangular windows. The middle floor contains sash windows, and on the top floor the windows are square casements.	II
Vine Inn (46 Kennedy Street); 53.47946°N 2.24303°W		Late 18th century (probable)	Originally a house, later converted into a public house. It is in brick, the ground floor faced with green glazed tiles, and the upper floors stuccoed, and it has a slate roof. There are three storeys, cellars, and three bays. The round-headed doorway has a doorcase with Tuscan columns and an open pediment, with an altered window to the left, and a lettered frieze above. On the middle floor are sash windows, and the top floor contains a long horizontal eight-light window.	II
10 Tib Lane; 53.48044°N 2.24457°W		Late 18th or early 19th century	A house, later used for other purposes, in red brick with sandstone dressings and a moulded and modillioned cornice. There are three storeys and two bays. On the ground floor are a doorway and a shop window, both with a moulded architrave, under a fascia board with a cornice. Above are sash windows with moulded architraves.	II
22 St Ann's Square; 53.48211°N 2.24592°W		Early 19th century (probable)	A house, later a shop, in stuccoed brick with a parapet. There are four storeys and three bays. On the ground floor is a 20th-century shop front, and above are sash windows with plain surrounds.	II
The Portico Library and Bank public house 53.47974°N 2.24045°W		1802–1806	Originally a library, the ground floor of which has since been converted into a public house, it was designed by Thomas Harrison in Greek Revival style, and built in Runcorn sandstone. It is on a corner site with two-storeys, a basement and an attic. On the Mosley Street front is a three-bay pedimented loggia with four unfluted Ionic columns, a moulded architrave, a frieze, and a dentilled cornice. The front on Charlotte Street has a colonnade of five engaged Ionic columns, between which are sash windows on the ground floor and square windows above. On top of the building is a dome.	II*
City Art Gallery; 53.47880°N 2.24164°W		1824–1835	Originally built for the Royal Manchester Institution, it was designed by Charles Barry in Greek Ionic style. It is in rusticated ashlar stone on a plinth, and has a rectangular plan with two storeys and a central attic. The main block has 11 bays flanked by projecting pavilions. In the centre is a pedimented portico with six giant Ionic columns, and to the sides are colonnades with Ionic columns and corner pilasters. Above is an entablature with a dentilled cornice and a plain parapet, behind which is a rectangular attic.	I
Friends' Meeting House; 53.47841°N 2.24598°W		1828–1831	The Friends' meeting house was designed by Richard Lane in Classical style. It is in brick with a sandstone façade, and is on a plinth, with corner pilasters, a frieze, a cornice, a blocking course, a central parapet, and a slate roof. There are two storeys and a symmetrical front of five bays. The meeting house is approached by two flights of steps, and on the front is a three-bay portico with engaged Ionic columns, an inscribed frieze, and a pediment. Above the doors is a fanlight, and the windows are sashes.	II
10 Mosley Street; 53.48106°N 2.23915°W		1836	Originally a bank, later used for other purposes, it is in Classical style, and built in sandstone with a slate roof. The building has a rectangular plan on a corner site, with three storeys, three bays on the front and five in the left return. The ground floor is rusticated, and on the upper floors are giant fluted Corinthian columns, an entablature, a dentilled and modillioned cornice, and a pediment. On the ground floor is a central doorway flanked by rectangular windows, and above is a frieze with four pairs of triglyphs. On the middle floor are French windows with corniced architraves and small balconies, and on the top floor are casement windows with moulded architraves.	II
Harvest House; 53.48085°N 2.23943°W		1839	Originally a textile warehouse designed by Edward Walters in the style of an Italian palazzo, and later used for other purposes. It is in red brick with sandstone dressings, rusticated quoinsa band, a prominent modillioned cornice, and a parapet. There are four storeys, a basement and an attic, and a front of six bays. The windows are sashes with segmental heads, and on the second floor they have linked hood moulds and lintels with triple keystones.	II
Former National and Provincial Building Society; 53.48079°N 2.24342°W		1841–42	Originally a bank designed by Richard Lane in Classical style, the ground floor was remodelled in 1904 by Charles Henry Heathcote. The building is in sandstone with granite trim on the ground floor, a moulded cornice, and a parapet with two corniced upstands. There are three storeys and a symmetrical front of five bays. The ground floor is rusticated, and contains an arcade of round-headed arches, the piers with moulded imposts, and on the upper floors are pilasters and a frieze with wreaths. The windows are sashes with moulded architraves.	II
Royale Club; 53.47774°N 2.24649°W		1845	A theatre, altered internally in 1875 by Edward Salomons, and remodelled in 1989 as a club, it is in sandstone, on a rectangular island site. It is in Classical style, and has two storeys and an attic, and a symmetrical front of three bays. In the centre is a projecting portico with Corinthian columns and pilasters, a modillioned cornice, and an entablature with a lettered frieze broken by a central arch above which is a gable. Steps lead up to doorways over which is a statue of Shakespeare in a pedimented niche. In the outer bays are pedimented windows with balconies.	II
Former Bank of England; 53.48082°N 2.24379°W		1845–46	The bank was designed by C. R. Cockerell in Classical style, and has since been used for other purposes. It is in sandstone on a plinth of Portland stone, and has a slate roof. There are three storeys and a basement, and a symmetrical front of five bays. The lower two floors are rusticated, they contain five engaged Doric columns, and above is an entablature with a triglyph frieze. The middle three bays have a balcony and a pediment, with a doorway in the centre flanked by three-light windows with Diocletian windows above.	I
1 Booth Street and 31 Pall Mall; 53.48044°N 2.24344°W		1846–47	Originally a warehouse, it is in the style of an Italian palazzo. The basement and ground floor are in sandstone, and above the building is in red brick with sandstone dressings, and it has a slate roof. The building has an irregular five-sided plan, with five storeys, a basement and added attics, and a front of seven bays including a curved bay on the right. The basement and ground floor are rusticated, the basement is also vermiculated, and above is a dentilled band. The round-headed doorway has a moulded surround, the basement windows have been altered, and above the windows are sashes with moulded architraves.	II
25 St Ann Street; 53.48191°N 2.24545°W		1848	A bank and manager's house designed for Heywood's Bank by J. E. Gregan, both in the style of an Italian palazzo and with hipped slate roofs. The bank is in sandstone on a plinth, with rusticated quoins, a rusticated ground floor, and a modillioned and dentilled cornice. There are three storeys, fronts of one and three bays, and a chamfered corner. On the ground floor are Venetian windows, the other windows are sashes, those on the middle floor with pedimented Corinthian architraves and balconies, and on the top floor with decorative architraves. The house is in red brick with dressings in sandstone, and has three storeys and four bays.	II*
St Mary's Church (The Hidden Gem); 53.48017°N 2.24645°W		1848	A Roman Catholic church designed by Weightman and Hadfield with Romanesque features. It is in red brick on a stone plinth, with dressings in sandstone and polychromatic brick, and a slate roof. The church has a nave, aisles, and a southeast tower. The tower has three stages, a round-headed niche containing a statue, a Lombard frieze, and a helm roof. The entrance portal to the left has a round-headed doorway, a moulded head, and a sculpture in the tympanum. Above are three lancet windows and a wheel window.	II*
Estate Exchange; 53.48061°N 2.24112°W		1852	An office building designed by Thomas Worthington in the style of an Italian palazzo, with two floors added by him in 1858. It is in red brick with sandstone dressings, corner pilasters, sill bands, a prominent modillioned cornice, a pierced parapet, and a slate roof, There are three storeys, a basement and attics, and a front of four bays. The round-headed doorway has a panelled architrave and a cornice. The ground floor windows have panelled jambs and cornices, on the middle floor they have moulded architraves and pediments on consoles, the top floor has an arcade of round-headed windows with a central niche, and in the attic are seven oeil-de-boeuf windows.	II*
Free Trade Hall; 53.47787°N 2.24728°W		1853–1856	Originally a public assembly hall, later a concert hall, and converted into a hotel in the 2000s. It was designed by Edward Walters in Renaissance style, and is built in Yorkshire sandstone. There are two storeys, a trapezoid plan, and a front of nine bays. The ground floor has a round-headed arcade with rectangular piers, richly carved spandrels containing shields, and a modillioned cornice. On the upper floor are paired Ionic columns with an entablature and cornice. Each bay contains a window with a pedimented architrave, a balustraded balcony, a carved tympanum, and spandrels with roundels.	II*
Vine Inn (42 and 44 Kennedy Street); 53.47954°N 2.24314°W		c. 1860–1870	Originally a textile warehouse, later part of a public house, it is in red brick with a stuccoed ground floor, sandstone dressings, moulded sill bands, a bracketed eaves cornice, and a slate roof. There are four storeys and a basement, and a symmetrical front of six bays. On the ground floor each outer bay contains a segmental-headed doorway with hollowed spandrels and a segmental pediment. The first floor windows have segmental heads, on the second floor they have flat heads, and the top floor contains round-headed windows with imposts and keystones; all the windows are sashes.	II
48 King Street; 53.48114°N 2.24590°W		c. 1860–1880	A shop in red brick with sandstone dressings and a slate roof, and in Gothic style. There are three storeys and three narrow bays. On the ground floor is a modern shop front framed by columns with crocketed caps, an entablature, and a moulded frieze. Above are brick corner pilasters, a panelled band, a moulded cornice and a parapet broken by an arch with a carved tympanum that rises to a gable. The windows are sashes, on the top floor they have transoms, and in both floors are balconies with wrought iron railings.	II
Royal Bank of Scotland; 53.48042°N 2.24016°W		1862	The bank was designed by Edward Walters in the style of an Italian palazzo, and was extended in the 1880s. It is in ashlar stone with a slate roof. The original block has three storeys, a front of seven bays with six bays on the side, and the extension added four bays. The building has a vermiculated plinth, the ground floor has banded piers, a modillioned cornice carrying a balustraded balcony, and the upper floors have pilasters and a bracketed cornice and a balustraded parapet with urns. On the ground floor are windows with Geometrical tracery, on the middle floor are sash windows with pedimented architraves, and the top floor contains smaller windows with moulded architraves. On the front is a portal with Tuscan columns, a cornice on consoles, and a balustraded parapet with urns.	II*
Albert Memorial; 53.47953°N 2.24523°W		1862–1865	The memorial in Albert Square commemorates Prince Albert. It was designed by Thomas Worthington with the sculpture by Matthew Noble. The statue is in white marble, and the rest of the memorial is in sandstone and in Gothic style. This consists of canopy with arches, corner piers with crocketed tops, statues, and an octagonal spire with a crocketed top and a wrought iron finial.	I
Waldorf House; 53.47913°N 2.24259°W		1863	Originally a Freemasons' Hall, later converted into a hotel, it is in ashlar stone. There are four storeys and cellars, and a symmetrical front of five bays. On the ground floor is channelled rustication, on the first and second floors are pilastrades with cornices, there is a bracketed cornice on the third floor, and over this is a parapet and a central pediment with a statue. The central round-headed doorway has engaged columns, a triglyph frieze, and a cornice, and there are outer doorways with rusticated surrounds. The windows in the central bays have two lights with central colonnades and roundels, and in the outer bays they have Ionic pilastrades.	II
Memorial Hall; 53.47892°N 2.24603°W		1863–1866	A meeting room later used for other purposes, it was designed by Thomas Worthington in Venetian Gothic style. The building is in red brick with dressings in sandstone and polychrome, bands, a corbel table, and a moulded cornice. It has a trapezoid plan, three storeys and a basement, three bays on the front, and six bays on the side. In the centre of the front is an arched doorway with internal steps. The windows have shafts, on the lower two floors they have arched heads with polychrome voussoirs, and on the top floor they are square headed with cusped lights and quatrefoil tracery.	II*
1–5 Central Street and 7 Southmill Street; 53.47871°N 2.24598°W		c. 1865	A warehouse later used for other purposes, it is in the style of an Italian palazzo. The building is in red brick with sandstone dressings on a rusticated vermiculated plinth, with rusticated quoins, sill bands, and a frieze of roundels. There are four storeys and a basement, 16 bays on Central Street and four on Southmill Street. The ground floor is arcaded and has coupled piers with moulded imposts and moulded keystones. The windows are sashes; on the ground floor they have round heads, and in the basement and upper floors they have segmental heads with moulded architraves and keystones. Also on the ground floor are two doorways and an arched wagon entrance.	II
Chancery Chambers; 53.48034°N 2.24252°W		Mid to late 19th century	A warehouse, later offices, in the style of an Italian palazzo, in sandstone and red brick with sandstone dressings. The building has a trapezoidal plan on a corner site, five storeys and a basement, 11 bays on the front and three on the left return. The ground floor is rusticated, and above are rusticated quoins, sill bands, and a prominent modillioned cornice. The windows are sashes with moulded architraves, on the top floor they have square heads, and below the heads are segmental; on the ground and first floors they also have keystones. In the fifth bay is a segmental-headed arch.	II
Cobden's statue 53.48193°N 2.24571°W		1867	The statue by Marshall Wood is in St Ann's Square, and commemorates the statesman Richard Cobden. It has a stone plinth, a slightly tapered square pedestal with a cornice, on which stands a bronze statue depicting Cobden.	II
46–48 Brown Street / Lombard Chambers; 53.48052°N 2.24276°W		1868	A bank, later offices, by George Truefitt, it is in sandstone with a slate roof. On a corner site, it has three storeys, four bays on Brown Street and seven on Chancery Lane. The ground floor is rusticated with arcades of round-headed windows, and at the top is a decorative frieze and cornice, and gabled dormers in the roof. On the corner is a semicircular two-storey oriel window, above which is a gabled turret with a wrought iron corona. On the ground floor are round-headed doorways, above which are carved pendentives, a balcony with wrought iron balustrade, and French windows over which is a cornice on decorative consoles. Most of the windows are casements, some with balconies.	II
66 and 68 Fountain Street; 53.47972°N 2.24235°W		1868	A commercial building designed by Clegg and Knowles in Venetian Gothic style. It is in red brick with sandstone dressings, sill bands, a bracketed cornice, and a slate roof. The building has a triangular plan on a corner site, four storeys, a basement and attics, eight bays on Fountain Street, nine on Booth Street, and an entrance bay on the corner. The windows on the lower three floors have segmental heads, voussoirs, and shafts with carved capitals, on the top floor is a continuous arcade of windows, and in the attic are inserted dormers. There is a segmental arch in the centre, and in the corner bay is a doorway with shafts, carved capitals, foliated imposts, a fanlight, and a hood mould.	II
73 and 75 Princess Street; 53.47903°N 2.24269°W		1868	Shops with offices above, in red brick with dressings in blue brick and sandstone, a moulded corbel table, and a slate mansard roof. There are four storeys, an attic, and fronts of 10 and three bays. On the ground floor is a modern shop front, and all the windows are sashes. The first and second floors contain segmental-headed windows, with pilastered piers between them and diapering between the floors. On the top floor are round-headed windows with colonettes, and the attic contains gabled dormers.	II
Harvester House; 53.47817°N 2.24687°W		1868	A warehouse in the style of an Italian palazzo, it is in sandstone on a vermiculated plinth, with a rusticated ground floor and a cornice, rusticated quoins, a frieze, a modillioned cornice, and a balustraded parapet. The building has a square plan, five storeys and a basement, and fronts of eight bays. On the ground floor are a round-headed doorway, round-headed windows with stepped voussoirs, and an inserted garage door. The windows on the upper floors are sashes in moulded architraves, those on the first floor with segmental pediments on consoles, those on the second floor with alternate triangular and segmental pediments, and those on the top floors with cornices.	II
Lloyd's House; 53.47901°N 2.24682°W		1868	Originally a warehouse, it is in red brick with sandstone dressings and a slate roof. There are three storeys, a basement and attic, with three bays on Southmill Street and 13 on Lloyd Street. On the corner is a five-bay drum containing an entrance with paired columns of polished granite on a sandstone plinth. with foliated capitals and a frieze. Above are sash windows, on the first floor with a panelled frieze, on the second floor with arched heads and a frieze, and in the attic with a cornice. Elsewhere the windows on the ground floor have arched heads, on the first floor they have segmental heads, and on the top floor they are behind arcades with colonnettes and round-headed arches.	II
Lancashire House; 53.47812°N 2.24643°W		c. 1868	A former warehouse in the style of a palazzo, it has a ground floor in sandstone on a plinth. The upper parts are in red brick with sandstone dressings, and have rusticated bands, a frieze, and a dentilled and modillioned cornice. There are four storeys and a basement, four bays on Peter Street, and nine on Southmill Street. The doorway has a segmental head and a decorative surround. The windows are sashes, some with moulded architraves, and others with round heads and hood moulds.	II
Princes Chambers; 53.48174°N 2.24344°W		c. 1868	Originally a warehouse and offices, later used for other purposes, the building is in red brick on a stone plinth, with sandstone dressings, sill bands, and a bracketed eaves cornice, and it is in the style of an Italian palazzo. The building is on a corner site, with a trapezoid plan, four storeys and a basement, a front of five bays, a curved corner bay, and eight bays on the return. The ground floor is arcaded with round-headed arches, pilasters, moulded imposts, and keystones, including a doorway and sash windows. The windows on the upper floors are similar, with segmental heads on the first and second floors.	II
Town Hall; 53.47937°N 2.24447°W		1868–1877	The town hall was designed by Alfred Waterhouse in Gothic style. It is built in brick with sandstone facing, and has slate roofs. The building has three main ranges in a triangular plan around a triangular courtyard and great hall, with three storeys and attics. There are towers and spires, with a central clock tower 286 feet (87 m) tall. Other features include gables, turrets, pinnacles, canted oriel windows, and balustraded parapets. Inside are murals by Ford Madox Brown and statues by William Theed.	I
Former Reform Club; 53.48096°N 2.24217°W		1870–71	The club was designed by Edward Salomons in Venetian Gothic style, but it has closed and the building is being used for other purposes. It is in sandstone on a chamfered plinth, with polychrome dressings, cornices, a blind-arcaded parapet, and a hipped slate roof. There are three storeys, a basement and an attic, and a symmetrical front of five bays, plus corner bays. The central round-headed doorway has a porch with colonnettes and an overhanging balustraded balcony. The windows on the ground floor are sashes, on the middle floor are round-headed windows with voussoirs, paired columns with carved capitals and balustraded balconies, and on the top floor are paired arched windows. The corner bays each contain an elaborate oriel window on an ornate bracket, and a balcony, rising to form an arcaded cupola with projecting grotesques.	II*
12 Mosley Street; 53.48093°N 2.23929°W		c. 1870–1880	A shop and offices with an iron frame, clad in sandstone, and with a slate roof. It has a rectangular plan with a canted corner, three storeys and an attic, and three bays plus the corner bay. The ground floor has been altered. Above are chamfered pilasters, a sill band, a bracketed eaves cornice, and balustraded parapets. The windows are mullioned sashes, with square heads on the middle floor and segmental heads on the top floor. In the attic are dormers and a pedimented gable with a finial.	II
Carlton House; 53.47888°N 2.24561°W		1872	A club and offices in Venetian Gothic style, built for the Bridgewater Canal Company and the Manchester Arts Club. It is in sandstone with a bracketed cornice, a slate roof, four storeys, a basement and attic, and four unequal bays. In the outer bays are three-storey oriel windows, above which are gabled dormers. There is an arched doorway with shafts and imposts, and the windows are sashes of various types, some with shafts and panelled aprons.	II
Massey Chambers; 53.48031°N 2.24355°W		1872	Designed by Edward Salomons in Renaissance style, the building is in sandstone with a slate roof. There are three storeys, a basement and an attic, a symmetrical front of five bays, and three bays at the rear. The central doorway has an architrave with polished pink granite pilasters, a lettered lintel, a cornice, and a carved pedimented entablature. On the first floor is an arcade of round-headed windows over which is a frieze and a bracketed cornice. At the top of the building is a parapet with a panel with a carved head over each bay, apart from the middle bay which has a dormer with a pilastered architrave and a carved pediment supported by putti.	II
Albert Chambers; 53.47892°N 2.24584°W		1873	Offices in Venetian Gothic style, the building is in sandstone with a moulded cornice, an embattled parapet, and a slate roof. There are four storeys and five bays. The doorway has a lintel on lion-mask brackets, a fanlight, and an arched surround with a mask and a lion and unicorn in the tympanum. All the windows are sashes; on the ground floor they have segmental heads, on the first floor they are round-headed with foliated sills, imposts, and hood moulds, and above these is a projecting sill on brackets. The windows in the centre of the second floor have flat heads and shafts with foliated caps, and the others have trefoil heads.	II
62 King Street; 53.48108°N 2.24536°W		1874	A shop in stone, partly stuccoed, with a hipped slate roof and a central gable. There are three storeys and an attic, and a front of five bays, the outer bays narrow. On the ground floor is a modern shop front, the first floor has three windows with ogee crests and poppyhead finials, on the second floor are three windows with rounded corners, and above is a false balcony pierced with quatrefoils and a three-light arched window. The outer bays have narrow windows, and on the top floor are cartouches with escutcheons.	II
Former Manchester and Salford Trustee Savings Bank; 53.47990°N 2.24304°W		1874	The former bank was designed by Edward Salomons in Renaissance style. It is in sandstone on a plinth, with bands, a prominent bracketed cornice, and a slate mansard roof. There are three storeys and an attic, and a symmetrical front of five bays. On the ground floor is a central doorway with a pilastered architrave and a segmental pediment containing carving. The middle floor contains an arcade of round-headed windows with linking impost bands, mask keystones, and hollow spandrels. On the top floor are segmental-headed windows with architraves, and in the attic are dormers with gablets with acroteria.	II
Lawrence Buildings; 53.47865°N 2.24552°W		1874	An office building originally for the Inland Revenue, in Gothic style. It is in sandstone with a slate roof, and has four storeys and attics, fronts of five bays, and a three-sided corner. On the corner is an arched doorway with shafts and flanked by statues of lions holding shields, above which is an elaborate two-storey oriel window. Other features include tourelles, a spirelet, gables, and a niche containing a statue of Queen Victoria and a crocketed canopy above.	II*
St Andrew's Chambers; 53.47886°N 2.24541°W		1874	Offices designed by G. T. Redmayne in Gothic style on a corner site. The building is in sandstone with string courses, a corbel table, a balustraded parapet, and a slate roof. There are four storeys and a basement, with two bays facing Albert Square, five facing Mount Street, and a bay on the corner. Facing Albert Square is a pair of round-headed doorways under a pointed arch with shafts, carved capitals, and a carved roundel. Above are single-light windows on the left and two-light windows on the right. The corner bay has a crocketed gable flanked by tourelles, the windows have heads of various shapes, and there is a niche containing a statue.	II
St Mary's Presbytery; 53.48016°N 2.24628°W		1870s	The presbytery is attached to St Mary's Church. It is in Venetian Gothic style, and built in orange brick with dressings in sandstone and coloured stone, on a stone plinth, with bands, an eaves entablature, and a slate roof. There are three storeys and a basement and two bays. On the ground floor is a two-light window to the left, and a doorway flanked by engaged red stone columns to the right. The middle floor has an oriel window to the left and a sash window to the right. On the top floor are two round-headed sash windows, one with one light and the other with two. Apart from the oriel window, all the windows and the doorway have banded red and grey voussoirs and hood moulds.	II
14 and 16 Princess Street and 77 and 77A Mosley Street; 53.47845°N 2.24212°W		c. 1875	An office and warehouse in red brick on a stone plinth, with sandstone dressings, sill bands, a bracketed cornice, and a balustraded parapet. The building has a rectangular plan with curved corners, four storeys and basements, 10 bays on the front, three-bay corners, and five bays in the returns. Part of the ground floor is arcaded with panelled pilasters, moulded imposts, and segmental arches with keystones. Most of the windows are sashes, and have moulded architraves. On the first floor some windows have swagged cartouches, and on the second floor some have balustraded balconies.	II
10 Kennedy Street; 53.48009°N 2.24385°W		Late 19th century	An office with a sandstone ground floor, in brick with sandstone dressings above. There are three storeys and three bays, the central bay narrower, and all have gables with panelled decoration. The central segmental-headed doorway has a moulded surround and a gabled canopy on brackets. Between the ground and middle floor is an ornamental band, between the upper floors is a blind arcade, and between the bays are three-sided shafts with domed finials. The windows are sashes, on the middle floor they have mullions and transoms, and on the top floor they have mullions.	II
28 King Street; 53.48119°N 2.24657°W		Late 19th century	A shop in stuccoed brick with a slate roof, three storeys and an attic. On the ground floor is a modern shop front, and the upper floors contain continuous arcades of windows with slender cast iron columns between. Above the top floor is a dentilled and modillioned cornice. In the attic is a central round-headed two-light window with an architrave and a segmental open pediment, flanked by square windows with corbel-tables.	II
30 King Street and 19 South King Street; 53.48116°N 2.24647°W		Late 19th century	A shop with fronts on two streets. The front on King Street is in sandstone, with decorative bands, and a modillioned eaves cornice. It is in Baroque style, with three storeys and an attic, and three unequal bays. On the ground floor is a modern shop floor, the middle bay on the upper storeys contains a segmental bow window with a balustraded parapet, and the outer bays contain single-light windows. At the top the attic has large volutes and a pedimented three-light window. The front on King Street South is in brick, with two low storeys and four bays. On the ground floor is a cast iron shop front with a decorative frieze and a cornice, on the upper floor are sash windows, and at the top is a cornice, a parapet, and a pediment with a ball finial.	II
33 King Street; 53.48130°N 2.24582°W		Late 19th century	A shop in red brick with stone dressings and a slate roof. There are four storeys, the lower two with one bay and the upper two with three bays. On the ground floor is a 20th-century shop window and corner pilasters with crocketed heads, and on the first floor is a three-light window, the outer lights forming oriel windows with pargeted underhangs. On the upper two storeys are sill bands, corbel tables, and sash windows with segmental heads, and at the top is a gable flanked by pinnacles.	II
41 South King Street; 53.48096°N 2.24568°W		Late 19th century	A shop and office in brick with stone dressings and a slate roof, three storeys and an attic, and four bays. Above the ground floor is a cornice, above the first floor is a frieze, above the second floor is a Lombard frieze and egg-and-dart cornice, and in the attic are round-headed dormers. There are arcades on all three floors, on the ground floor with a round-headed doorway and windows with cast iron twisted shafts, moulded heads, and carved keyblocks. On the first floor are panelled pilasters, and on the top floor are paired colonnettes.	II
Mansfield Chambers; 53.48209°N 2.24536°W		Late 19th century	Shops and offices in stuccoed brick with dressings in stone and in fibreglass replacing plaster. The building is in Italianate style, and has a U-shaped plan with a rear wing and a rear extension. There are four storeys and a front of five bays. The lower two storeys form an arcade with pilasters, a frieze and a moulded cornice. The third floor has a sill band and a frieze, and at the top is a modillioned cornice and a pilastered parapet with urns.	II
National House; 53.48153°N 2.24487°W		1875–76	Built as a Conservative club, it is in sandstone and in Baroque style. There are three storeys, three bays on St Ann Street, seven bays on Cross Street, and a curved bay on the corner. The central entrance in St Ann Street has pilasters, Tuscan on the ground floor, Ionic on the middle floor, and Corinthian on the top floor. The doorway has an elaborate surround, a carved tympanum, and an open segmental pediment. Above it are Venetian windows, and over the first floor window is a curved frieze and a balcony. In the corner bay are cylindrical oriel windows. The other windows on the upper floors have segmental heads and pierced aprons, on the middle floor they have open pediments and on the top floor cornices, all containing carvings.	II
G Mex; 53.47662°N 2.24653°W		1875–1880	Originally Manchester Central railway station, built by the Cheshire Lines Committee and designed by Sir John Fowler. The station closed in 1967, and was converted into an exhibition centre in the 1980s. It has a brick undercroft, brick walls, and a superstructure in iron and glass. The building has a rectangular plan with a segmental arch of 15 bays and a span of 210 feet (64 m). Along the south front are two storeys, the bays separated by pilasters, with round-headed windows on the ground floor and square-headed windows above. At the north end is a glazed canopy.	II*
12 Tib Lane; 53.48043°N 2.24449°W		1876	A sandstone warehouse in Italian Gothic style with four storeys and a basement, and a front of thee narrow bays. The basement has vermiculated piers and the ground floor is rusticated. Above there are moulded sill bands, a Lombard frieze, and a moulded cornice on brackets. The doorway has an elaborate surround including a two-light fanlight with an arched canopy on columns. On the ground floor are sash windows with segmental heads and stepped voussoirs, and on the upper floors are arcades of windows with different types of surround on each floor.	II
105–113 Deansgate and 5–15 John Dalton Street; 53.48091°N 2.24767°W		1876	A block containing shops, offices and a bank, in sandstone with a slate roof. It has a trapezoid plan, with four storeys and cellars, five bays on Deansgate, seven bays on John Dalton Street, and further bays on the canted corners. On the Deansgate front are 20th-century shop fronts, polygonal piers, sill bands with grotesques, oriel windows, and gables. The canted corner contains a three-bay open arcade, a two-storey oriel window with an embattled parapet, and a gable. On the John Dalton Street front are mullioned windows and an arched doorway.	II
1–7 Princess Street and 59 and 61 Cross Street; 53.48022°N 2.24491°W		1877	Shops and offices on a curved corner site, in red brick with sandstone dressings and a red tiled roof. There are four storeys and an attic, and a total of eight bays. The ground floor is in stone, and contains elliptical-headed windows and a doorway. On the first and second floors are mullioned and transomed windows, some canted and others bowed, with terracotta traceried panels between the floors. At the top are gables, tourelles, finials, open-work parapets, and a spirelet.	II
36 Kennedy Street; 53.47971°N 2.24338°W		1878	An office with only the façade remaining. This is in sandstone and in free Gothic style, with two storeys, a basement and an attic, and 1 1/2 bays. On the front are buttress-pilasters and shafts, and at the top is a pierced parapet, and a dormer with pinnacles and a gable containing an oculus. In the centre of the ground floor is a shaft surmounted by a carved winged lion. This is flanked by windows, and to the right is a doorway with a four-centred arch, a hood mould, and a rectangular fanlight. On the upper floor is a wide canted oriel window, above which are two large roundels.	II
Elliott House; 53.47925°N 2.24872°W		1878	Offices that were extended in 1904 and 1914, with the ground floor in sandstone, red brick and terracotta with sandstone dressings above, and a slate roof. The building is in Queen Anne style, and has three storeys, a basement and attics, and a front of eight bays. Above the left three bays is a shaped gable and above the rest is a balustraded parapet. In the corners are shaped windows with ornamental surrounds including putti, and oriel windows above. The doorway has a moulded architrave, a cornice and a fanlight. Other features include pilasters, moulded terracotta panels, and sash windows with keystones.	II
49 Spring Gardens; 53.48035°N 2.24167°W		1879	A warehouse later used for other purposes, it is in sandstone with sill bands, a Lombard frieze, a bracketed moulded cornice, a blind-arcaded parapet with gabled dormers and finials, and a slate mansard roof. It has a rectangular plan with curved corners, three storeys, an attic and basement, and symmetrical fronts of five bays plus the corners. There is a central round-headed doorway above which is a balcony with iron railings. The windows are sashes with colonettes.	II
19 King Street; 53.48138°N 2.24654°W		c. 1880	A shop in yellow brick with sandstone dressings, a parapet, and a slate roof. There are four storeys and four bays. On the ground floor is a 20th-century shop front, and above are arcades of windows. Between the windows on the first floor are slim cast iron columns with openwork brackets, on the second floor the windows have round heads, shafts, decorative imposts, and linked hood moulds, and on the top floor they have shouldered heads.	II
31 Princess Street; 53.47973°N 2.24393°W		c. 1880–1890 (probable)	Shops and offices in sandstone on a plinth, with a string course, bands, a bracketed cornice, and an arcaded parapet with a central gablet flanked by pinnacles. The building is in Venetian Gothic style, with four storeys, and a symmetrical front of three bays, the central bay narrower. On the ground floor are shop fronts and a central segmental-headed doorway with a fanlight, and on the upper floors are arcades of sash windows.	II
47 Spring Gardens; 53.48056°N 2.24185°W		1881	Offices designed by Heathcote and Rawle in Baroque style. The building is in sandstone on a granite plinth, and has a slate roof. It has a triangular plan on a sharply angled corner site, three storeys and attics. The main part of the front has three bays, with a segmentally-bowed bay to the right, and a tapering wing beyond that. On the ground floor are pilasters, an entablature and a cornice, the first floor has Corinthian semi-columns, an entablature and a cornice, and on the top floor are pilasters, a frieze, a bracketed cornice, and a parapet. At the top are decorative pedimented gables, and above the bowed bay is a Baroque turret with a domed cupola.	II
60 and 62 Spring Gardens and 58 Fountain Street; 53.48019°N 2.24189°W		1881–1883	A warehouse, later offices, designed by Alfred Waterhouse in Renaissance style. It is in sandstone with bands, a modillioned cornice, a panelled parapet between pedimented dormers, and a slate roof. The building has a rectangular plan on a corner site with chamfered corners, four storeys and an attic, and a front of seven bays plus the corners. The ground floor is rusticated and contains an arcade of round-headed arches with stepped voussoirs. The windows are mullioned with carved panels between the first and second floors, and on the corners are octagonal turrets with domed caps and lanterns.	II
Law Library; 53.48001°N 2.24375°W		1884–85	The library was designed by Thomas Hartas in Venetian Gothic style. It is in sandstone, with a dentilled cornice and a slate roof. The library has a rectangular plan, two storeys with a basement and attic, and a front of three bays. In the right bay is a recessed doorway with a screen of open tracery, and in the centre of the upper floor is an oriel window with an open-arcaded parapet. The other windows are three-light sashes, those on the top floor with quatrefoils above.	II*
Fraser's statue 53.47992°N 2.24493°W		1888	The statue, by Thomas Woolner, stands in Albert Square and commemorates James Fraser, former Bishop of Manchester. The statue is in bronze and depicts a standing figure on a square pedestal of polished stone, with a broad moulded plinth and a moulded cornice. On three sides are bronze relief panels.	II
41 Spring Gardens; 53.48094°N 2.24164°W		1888–1890	The building was designed by Alfred Waterhouse in French Renaissance style for the National Provincial Bank. It is in ashlar stone with a slate roof. The building is on a corner site with a curved front, three storeys and an attic, and 11 bays. On the ground floor are Doric pilasters carrying a frieze above which are Ionic pilasters on carved pedestals. Over this is an entablature with a frieze, and dormers with decorative gables and linked by arches. Most of the windows are sashes in architraves, and on the middle floor they have curved pediments. The doorways have ornamental corbels, columns and balconies.	II
43 and 45 Spring Gardens; 53.48072°N 2.24173°W		1888–1890	Originally a bank designed by Heathcote in Baroque style, it is in Portland stone and sandstone and has a slate roof. There are three storeys, a basement and attic, and a front of seven bays. The outer bays each contain a doorway in a round-headed arch, the left bay is surmounted by a Baroque turret, and the right bay with a parapet and a segmental pediment. The lower parts of the central bays are rusticated with giant piers carrying a balustraded balcony. The upper part has Ionic columns and pilasters, and a pedimented gable with Corinthian columns.	II
Prudential Assurance Office; 53.48087°N 2.24428°W		1888–1896	An office building by Alfred Waterhouse, later reduced in size, including removal of the gables and the tower. It is in red brick and terracotta, with some granite on the ground floor, which is arcaded, corbel tables, and a parapet. The building is on an island site, with a rectangular plan, four storeys and an attic, six bays on the front, and a splayed bay on the corner. The windows are round-headed, those on the second floor with transoms.	II
Bright's statue 53.47973°N 2.24507°W		1891	The statue, by Albert Bruce-Joy, stands in Albert Square and commemorates the statesman John Bright. The statue is in white marble and depicts a standing figure wearing a long coat. This stands on a polished granite pedestal that has a base of two steps, a moulded plinth, concave tapering sides, and a moulded cornice.	II
Heywood's statue 53.47933°N 2.24537°W		1891	The statue, by Albert Bruce-Joy, stands in Albert Square and commemorates the banker and philanthropist Oliver Heywood. It is in marble and depicts Heywood standing and wearing a top coat. There is a square pedestal in polished granite with tapered sides, an inscription, and a moulded cornice, on two steps.	II
Former Northern Rock Building Society; 53.48092°N 2.24466°W		1895	Offices in terracotta and stone designed by Heathcote in Flemish Renaissance style on a corner site. There are four storeys and attics, with four bays on Cross Street, three on King Street and a bay on the corner. The windows are a mix of sashes and casements, divided by columns on the first floor, and with blind arcading above. In the attic are large shaped gables, and in the corner bay is a two-storey oriel window. On the Cross Street front is an elaborate doorway with a fanlight and a curved pediment, and there is a simpler doorway in the corner.	II
Jubilee Fountain; 53.47983°N 2.24500°W		1897	The fountain, which is in Albert Square, commemorated the Diamond jubilee of Queen Victoria. It was designed by Thomas Worthington and John Cassidy. The fountain stands on three hexagonal steps of grey granite, and consists of two hexagonal bowls, the lower one in red granite, and the upper, smaller one in sandstone. There are six bronze gargoyle waterspouts at the angles of the lower bowl, and rising from the upper bowl is a finial surmounted by a bronze dolphin. Around the lower bowl are inscriptions and carved coats of arms.	II
Old Exchange; 53.48133°N 2.24598°W		1897	A range of shops containing a through passage, in red sandstone and terracotta, with a slate mansard roof. There are three storeys with attics, and three bays. On the ground floor are 20th-century shop fronts, pilastered piers, and a lettered frieze. The upper floors contain giant Ionic pilasters, decorative terracotta panels, a bracketed frieze, and a moulded cornice. The windows on the middle floor have elliptical heads, mullions and transoms and decorated spandrels, on the top floor they have segmental heads and mullions, and in the attic are pedimented dormers.	II
Colwyn Chambers; 53.48067°N 2.23977°W		1898	Originally a bank, later used for other purposes, it is in Neo-Baroque style. The building is Portland stone with a slate roof, and has a rectangular plan with chamfered corners, four storeys, and three bays on each front, plus bays on the corners. The ground floor is rusticated, on the middle floors are giant Ionic colonnades, and at the top is a prominent decorated cornice. The corner bays are three-sided, they have pilasters with volutes, and are surmounted by domed octagonal turrets. The round-headed doorways have architraves including Ionic columns with crouching atlantes carrying open segmental pediments.	II
Alliance House; 53.48185°N 2.24474°W		1901	Offices on a corner site by Heathcote and Rawle in sandstone with a slate roof. There are four storeys and an attic, with six bays on Cross Street, three on St Ann Street, and a corner bay. The ground floor has been altered, and at the top are dormers with shaped gables and parapets between. The windows are sashes; on the first floor they have flat heads, on the upper floors they have round heads, and are paired on the top floor. Some bays project and have carved spandrels and balustraded parapets. On the corner is an octagonal two-stage turret that has a pierced parapet with finials and a domed cupola.	II
Gladstone's statue 53.47913°N 2.24551°W		1901	The statue is in Albert Square and commemorates the politician William Gladstone. It is in bronze, and depicts Gladstone standing with a raised pointing hand. The statue is on a pedestal of polished granite with inverted consoles at the corners, a carved frieze, and a moulded octagonal plinth, and under this is an octagonal sandstone base of two steps.	II
Winters Buildings; 53.48156°N 2.24523°W		1901	Shops and offices, with grey granite on the ground floor and red brick and buff terracotta above, and a slate roof. The building is on a corner site, and has four storeys and attics, and fronts of four bays and a bay on the chamfered corner. Features include chamfered pilasters, octagonal corner tourelles, a frieze over the ground floor, a band of moulded terracotta panels over the first floor, canted oriel windows, a dentilled cornice, a parapet and gabled dormers. On the corner the attic dormer has a shaped gable and moulded terracotta decoration and lettering.	II
Number 54 and Thomas's Chop House; 53.48135°N 2.24487°W		1901	Ground-floor public house and restaurant, with commercial uses above. Red brick and buff terracotta in an elaborate free‑Jacobean style. Narrow plan extending to St Ann's Churchyard. Single‑bay front with granite pilasters, glazed‑terracotta mezzanine and a two‑storey oriel. Attic gable with pinnacles and a carved cartouche dated 1901. Return elevation partly simplified; rear has convex buff‑terracotta front with "THOMAS'S CHOP HOUSE" lettering and dated panel.	II
15–17 King Street; 53.48141°N 2.24678°W		1902	A shop designed by Maxwell and Tuke with applied timber framing and a slate roof. There are four storeys, five bays on King Street, three wide bays on Police Street, and a curved bay on the corner. On the ground floor are plate glass windows and panelled piers. There are mullioned and transomed windows on the first and top floors, and on the second floor the windows are set-in oriels, some with balustraded balconies. Above the corner is an octagonal turret with a swept sides and an arcaded cupola; this is flanked by gables, and there are two more gables on King Street, all with finials.	II
Former National Westminster Bank; 53.48115°N 2.24150°W		1902	Built for Parr's Bank and designed by Heathcote in Edwardian Baroque style, the building has since been used for other purposes. It is on a corner site, in red sandstone on a grey granite plinth, and has a slate roof. There are three unequal storeys and an attic, seven bays on York Street, including the splayed corner bay, and six bays on Spring Gardens. On the tall ground floor are paired Doric columns on banded piers with round-headed windows between. On the first floor are three-light mullioned windows with architraves and keystones, and above them is a modillioned cornice. On the top floor are segmental-arched windows with festoons between, and in the attic are dormer windows with segmental pediments. The corner bay has a round-headed doorway, a balcony above, and it rises to a cylindrical Baroque turret with a domed roof and a lantern.	II*
Northern Assurance Building; 53.48006°N 2.24442°W		1902	Shops and offices in sandstone and some grey granite, and with slate roofs. The building has an irregular plan on a corner site, and has five storeys on the front, three on the side, and attics. The main front has three wide bays and a curved corner. The central round-headed doorway is in a round-headed arch, above is a feature with a balustraded parapet and ball finials, and at the top is a shaped gable flanked by octagonal turrets. The windows on the first and second floors are sashes, and on the upper floors they are mullioned and transomed. The curved corner rises to become a cylindrical turret that has a domed roof with a cupola and a finial.	II
Princes Buildings; 53.47649°N 2.24309°W		1903	Shops, offices and warehouses that were rebuilt in the later 20th century, retaining only the façade. This is in pale buff brick with terracotta dressings and in Art Nouveau style. There are four storeys and an attic, and eight bays. In the attic are windows with parapets, eight tall chimneys, and an open balustrade in the outer bays. Two of the bays have tall segmental arches containing two-storey canted oriel windows. All the windows have elaborate terracotta surrounds.	II
Anglia House; 53.48034°N 2.24527°W		1906	An insurance building designed by Heathcote in free Baroque style. The ground floor is in polished granite, the upper floors are in red sandstone, and the roof is lead clad. There are three storeys and an attic, five bays on Cross Street, one on John Dalton Street, and a canted corner between. On the ground floor is an Ionic colonnade with doorways and windows, and above is a pulvinated frieze and a cornice. On the upper floors are banded pilasters, casement windows with broken pediments on the first floor, sash windows on the second floor, and round-headed casements in the attic. At the top are gables, and on the corner is a cylindrical Baroque turret with an ogival domed roof.	II
Northern Stock Exchange; 53.48201°N 2.24283°W		1907	The stock exchange was designed by Bradshaw Gass & Hope in Edwardian Baroque style, and has since been used for other purposes. It is in Portland stone, and has three storeys and an attic, a symmetrical front of seven bays, and a domed hall. The ground floor is rusticated with a cornice and contains round-headed arches with windows and doorways. On the middle floor are oriel windows, and the top floor has colonnaded windows. The doorway has an open segmental pediment, and above it is a rectangular window flanked by paired Ionic columns and over this is a lunette.	II
Sculptural group Adrift; 53.47789°N 2.24515°W		1907	An allegorical statue by John Cassidy outside Central Library. It is in bronze, and depicts a man standing on a rock waving a cloth, while below him are his wife and children looking exhausted. The statue was moved to its present site in 2014.	II
Boer War Memorial; 53.48253°N 2.24549°W		1908	The memorial by Hamo Thornycroft in St Ann's Square commemorates those lost in the Boer War. It consists of a square marble plinth and a bronze-clad slightly tapering pedestal with a marble cornice. On this is a bronze sculpture depicting a rifleman standing over a wounded comrade. On the sides of the pedestal are bronze plaques recording the names of those lost in the conflict.	II
Memorial Cross; 53.47768°N 2.24377°W		1908	The cross in St Peter's Square stands on the site of the former St Peter's Church, which was demolished in 1907. It was designed by Temple Moore, and is in Portland stone. The cross is in Gothic style on a shaft of clustered columns with angels and shields halfway up. This stands on a hexagonal pedestal with a swept top and decorated with quatrefoils and brattishing, and is on a base of four hexagonal steps.	II
Barclays; 53.48186°N 2.24225°W		1908–1910	Originally the Palatine Bank, it is in Portland stone with a slate roof. It is in Norman style, and has four storeys, a basement and attic, and fronts of four and five bays plus corner towers. On the ground floor are windows and a doorway, all round-headed. The upper floors on Norfolk Street form an arcade with half-columns, dog-tooth and nail-head decoration, and on the top floor are Diocletian windows. The corner towers are circular and have three-bay arcades, machicolated friezes and conical roofs.	II
Albert Memorial Hall; 53.47831°N 2.24791°W		1910	Originally a Wesleyan mission hall, later used for other purposes, it is clad in yellow terracotta. There are three storeys and seven bays, with a six-stage tower at the left and an entrance bay on the right. The central five bays have four-light windows, pilasters, shaped gables, and corner turrets; the central bay has a decorative pediment and traceried spandrels. The left bay has a bowed entrance and a two-storey bow window above, and at the top is an octagonal cupola with a dome.	II
56–58 Peter Street and 14–18 Mount Street; 53.47770°N 2.24577°W		1911	Built as a YMCA club in reinforced concrete, it was converted into offices in the 1990s, maintaining only the façade. This is in buff and brown terracotta, it has five storeys and an attic, and is on a corner site. It is in free Baroque style with Art Nouveau details. On the ground floor is a large semicircular arched entrance with voussoirs. Features include canted oriel windows, a reproduction of Donatello's Saint George in a niche, and a niche containing a shield under a canted canopy.	II
Eagle House; 53.48099°N 2.24506°W		1911	An insurance office designed by Heathcote in Edwardian Baroque style, it is in sandstone with a slate mansard roof. There are four storeys and an attic, and a front of five bays plus curved corners. The ground floor is rusticated, above it is a balcony with wrought iron railings, the upper floors contain giant fluted Ionic pilasters, a pulvinated frieze, and a modillioned cornice. In the centre is a round-headed doorway with a moulded surround and flanked by cartouches. Above that is a window with an open pediment, and at the top is a semicircular open pediment surmounted by an eagle. On the first floor are casement windows, and the windows on the top floor are sashes.	II
Former Lloyds Bank; 53.48122°N 2.24450°W		1913–1915	The bank, designed by Heathcote in Edwardian Baroque style, is built in Portland stone on a grey granite plinth. It has an L-shaped plan, with four storeys, a basement, a double attic, and fronts of seven and eight bays. The lower two floors are rusticated, with a cornice and a balustraded parapet to each bay. They contain round-headed arches with voussoirs, and stepped keystones. The upper floors contain a giant colonnade, a lettered frieze, and a modillioned cornice containing segmental pediments. The windows vary, and include cross-windows, mullioned windows, lunettes, and Venetian windows.	II
Royal Exchange; 53.48251°N 2.24470°W		1914–1921	The present building replaces former buildings on the site, and was designed by Bradshaw, Gass and Hope in Classical style. It is in sandstone, and has a slate mansard roof with three domes. There are four storeys and two attic storeys. On the ground floor are channelled rusticated piers, the upper floors contain giant Corinthian columns, a large entablature and a modillioned cornice. Above the lower attic storey is a cornice and a balustraded parapet. At the northwest corner is a Baroque turret, and on the other corners are domes. There are large round-headed entrance arches. A theatre has been installed in the interior.	II
Abraham Lincoln statue 53.47967°N 2.24716°W		1919	The statue, by George Grey Barnard, commemorates Abraham Lincoln, and was moved to its present site in 1986. It is in bronze and depicts Lincoln standing, and is set on a 20th-century plinth.	II
1 Albert Square; 53.48014°N 2.24546°W		c. 1919	An office building designed by Percy Worthington in Classical style. It is in Portland stone and has a narrow tapering plan on a corner site. There are four storeys, the corner convex front has three bays, and there are five bays along John Dalton Street. In the centre of the front is a round-headed doorway with a chamfered surround, and above are giant Corinthian pilasters. The windows are sashes with wrought iron balconies, those on the first floor with moulded architraves and cornices. At the top is an entablature, a plain frieze, a dentilled cornice with modillions, and a high parapet with balustrades. On the John Dalton front the ground floor windows are round-headed, and on the first floor they have moulded architraves, some with pediments or cornices.	II
Manchester War Memorial; 53.47870°N 2.24296°W		1924	The memorial was designed by Edwin Lutyens, it was originally sited in St Peter's Square, and moved to a position near the Town Hall in 2014. The memorial is in Portland stone, and consists of a cenotaph flanked by two obelisks and a War Stone, all on a stepped platform. On top of the cenotaph is a carving of an Unknown Soldier on a catafalque, and lower is carvings of a wreath, a sword, and a crown, and inscriptions. On the obelisks are carvings of swagged garlands.	II*
Ship Canal House; 53.48076°N 2.24302°W		1924–1927	An office building by Harry S. Fairhurst with a steel frame and a cladding of Portland stone. It has an L-shaped plan, seven storeys, a basement and attic, and a symmetrical front of seven bays. There is a rusticated ground floor, on the sixth and seventh floors is a screen consisting of paired fluted Tuscan columns, a frieze, a cornice, a parapet with a statue of Neptune, and a recessed attic. In the centre is a round-headed entrance with rusticated voussoirs and a triple keystone, above which is a balcony and a window with a pedimented architrave. In the attic are lunettes, and the other windows are casements with plain surrounds.	II
Electricity junction box, Library Walk; 53.47851°N 2.24483°W		Early 20th century	The junction box is in cast iron and has a rectangular plan. It has moulded edges and a moulded cornice, above which is a pyramidal cap with embattled edge. The longer side on the front contains a door with a plaque containing the crest of the city, surrounded by strapwork in relief; the back and the shorter sides are plain.	II
Electricity junction box, Lincoln Square; 53.47976°N 2.24700°W		Early 20th century	The junction box is in cast iron and has a rectangular plan. It has moulded edges and a moulded cornice, above which is a pyramidal cap with embattled edge. Each of the longer sides contains a door with a plaque containing the crest of the city, surrounded by strapwork in relief; the shorter sides are plain.	II
Atlas Chambers; 53.48074°N 2.24273°W		1929	An office building designed by Michael Waterhouse, it has a steel frame and is clad in Portland stone. The building is on a corner site, with a chamfered corner, six storeys and an attic. On the King Street front are four bays and three bays in the attic, and on the Brown Street front are six bays in the main part and the attic. At the entrance is a bronze doorway with a bronze statue of Atlas, and on the corner is a bronze plaque. On both fronts are two cornices, the King Street front has a pedimented attic, and on the Brown Street front are fluted Doric columns. The windows are casements with plain surrounds.	II
Central Library; 53.47816°N 2.24469°W		1930–1934	The library was designed by E. Vincent Harris in Classical style. It is in Portland stone, and has a circular plan with a rectangular portico, four storeys with a basement and attic, and a domed reading room. The main part has a chamfered plinth, rusticated lower floors, and a Greek key frieze. On the upper floors is a continuous Tuscan colonnade with a cornice and parapet. The portico has five bays, four giant Corinthian columns in antis, and an entablature with a dentilled cornice. The windows on the ground floor are round-headed with keystones, on the first floor are square windows, and above are small rectangular windows.	II*
Former Midland Bank; 53.48062°N 2.24231°W		1933–1935	The bank, later converted into other uses, was designed by Edwin Lutyens and is built in Portland stone. It stands on an island site with a rectangular plan. There are 10 storeys, a basement and attic, which are arranged in diminishing stages. On the ground floor are large round-headed windows, and most of the upper floors have smaller rectangular windows. The attic floors contain on each side a pavilion with Corinthian semi-columns distyle in antis, a large round-headed window in the centre, and rectangular windows in the outer bays, with a crest above the centre.	II*
Town Hall Extension; 53.47860°N 2.24426°W		1934–1938	The town hall extension was designed by E. Vincent Harris. It has a steel frame clad in Darley Dale sandstone and a slate roof. The building has an irregular plan with a curved south side, and has nine storeys, the top two storeys recessed behind a parapet, and fronts of 29, 17 and five bays. The ground floor has an arcade of round-headed arches. The front facing Mount Street has five giant oriel windows, and in the other fronts are small rectangular windows, those on the top floors being mullioned and transomed. In the attic are dormers with hipped roofs. There are two stair towers each with a tall round-headed arch containing elaborate tracery, above which is a niche with a statue.	II*
Pair of telephone kiosks 53.47820°N 2.24394°W		1935	A pair of K6 type telephone kiosks, designed by Giles Gilbert Scott. Constructed in cast iron with a square plan and a dome, they have three unperforated crowns in the top panels.	II
Pall Mall Court, piazza and podium 53.48111°N 2.24289°W		1969	An office building with a reinforced concrete frame, grey-bronze ceramic-mosaic cladding to the service towers, and Staffordshire blue bricks and bronze painted-aluminium cladding to the rest of the building. It has a Z-shaped plan, and consists of a six-storey six-bay block facing King Street, a spine block of 12 storeys and 11 bays, the upper eight bays projecting, and a six-storey six-bay block facing Marsden Street. There are also two service towers and two stair towers. To the west is a raised piazza with a tall podium to the north containing plants and trees.	II
