= 46–48 Brown Street =

Listed building in Manchester, England

Coordinates: 53.48054°N 2.24279°W

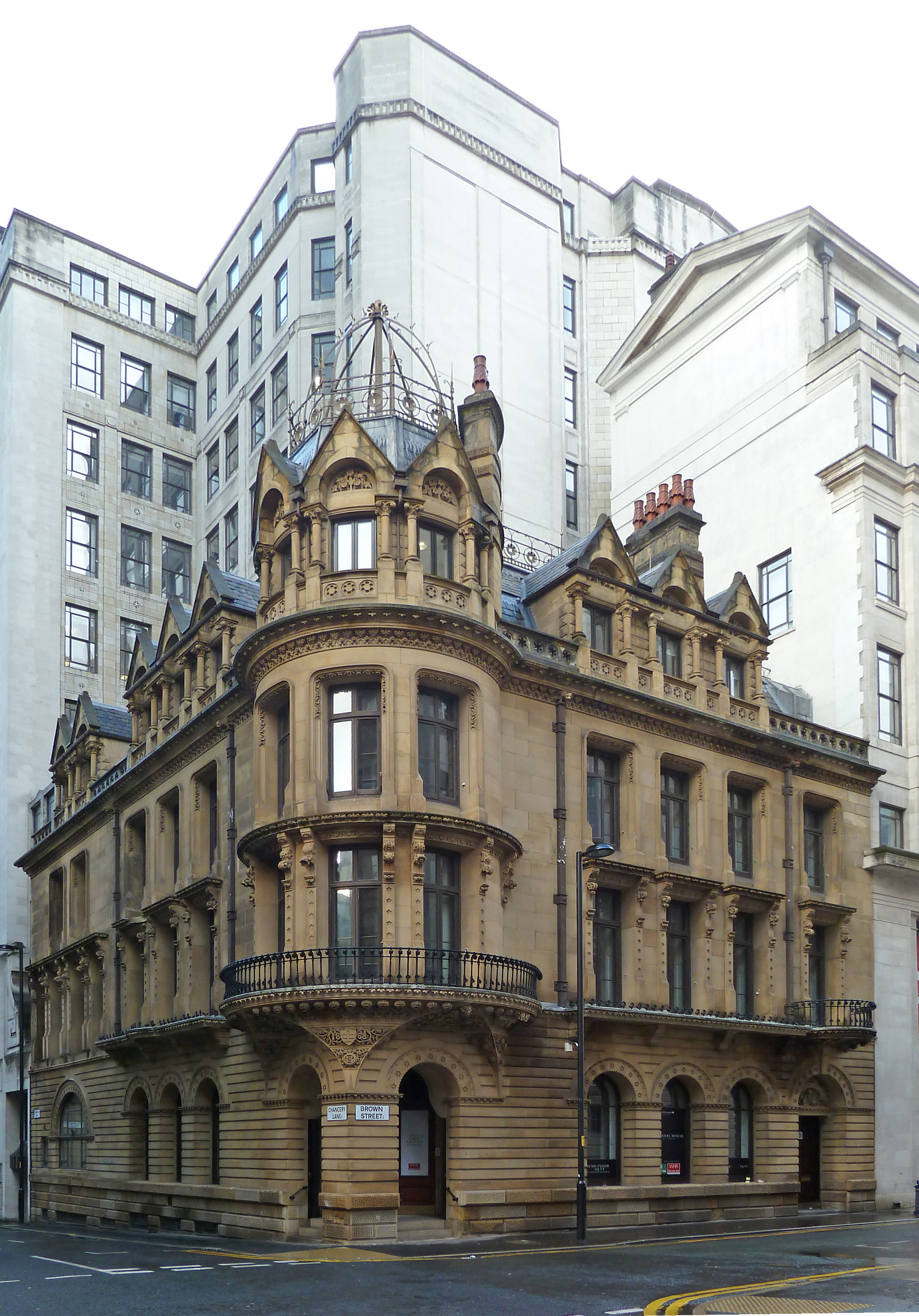
- 46–48 Brown Street, Manchester
- Interactive map of the 46–48 Brown Street area

General information
- Architectural style: Eclectic with Gothic elements
- Location: Manchester, M2 4AH
- Year built: 1868

Technical details
- Material: Sandstone ashlar
- Floor count: 3

Design and construction
- Architect: George Truefitt
- Designations

Listed Building – Grade II
- Official name: Lombard Chambers
- Designated: 3 October 1974
- Reference no.: 1208211

46–48 Brown Street is a Grade II listed building in Manchester, England. Situated in the Spring Gardens area of Manchester city centre near King Street, it was home to Brook's Bank. The building is also known as Lombard Chambers.

It was built as a bank in 1868, and designed by George Truefitt. The building has a sandstone ashlar exterior and slate roof. It is eclectic in style but has Gothic elements. At the corner there is a three-storey oriel window topped with an intricate ironwork crown.

== See also ==
- Listed buildings in Manchester-M2
