= The Hidden Gem =

Church in Manchester, England

Church of St Mary, Manchester
- Shrine and Parish Church of St Mary, Manchester
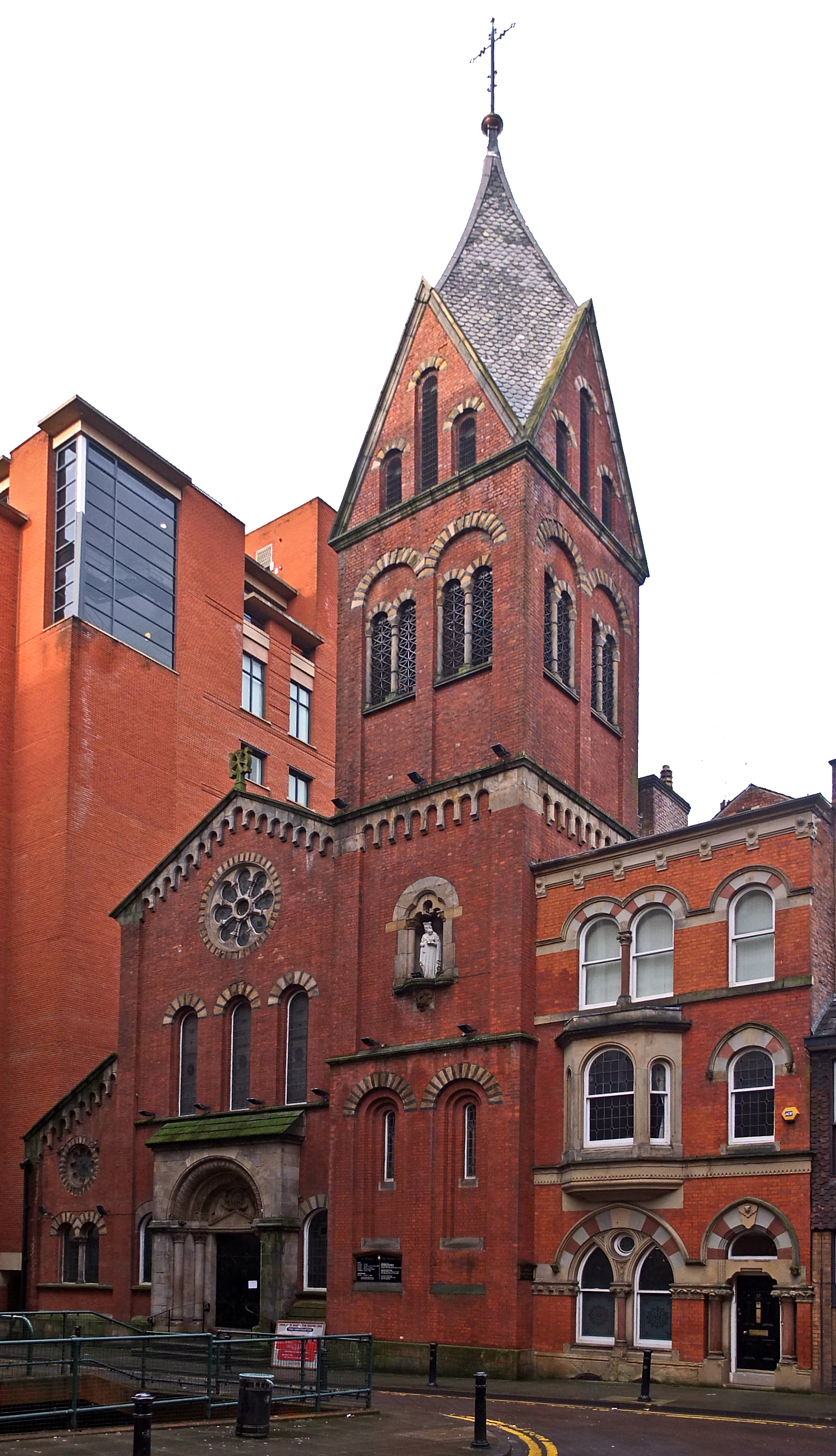
- Exterior of the Church of St Mary 'Hidden Gem', Mulberry Street, Manchester
- Church of St Mary, Manchester
- 53°28′49″N 2°14′47″W
- OS grid reference: SJ 83742 98188
- Location: Manchester
- Country: England
- Denomination: Roman Catholic
- Website: St Mary's

History
- Status: Active
- Dedication: Our Lady of the Assumption
- Consecrated: 1848; 178 years ago

Architecture
- Functional status: Active
- Heritage designation: Grade II* listed
- Designated: 18 December 1963
- Architect(s): Richard Lane; M. E. Hadfield
- Architectural type: Church
- Style: Italian, Norman, Gothic and Byzantine
- Years built: 1844–48

Specifications
- Materials: Stone and brick

Administration
- Province: Province of Liverpool
- Diocese: Diocese of Salford
- Deanery: St Ambrose Barlow (South Manchester)

Clergy
- Priest: Rev. Mgr Canon A. Kay

The Hidden Gem, officially St Mary's Catholic Church, is a church on Mulberry Street, Manchester, England. The parish dates back to 1794, with devotion to St Mary, Our Lady of the Assumption, and the present church, rebuilt in 1848, is a Grade II* listed building which includes the Diocesan Shrine of Our Lady of Manchester.

== History ==
The first permanent Catholic Mass Centre to be opened in Manchester following the Reformation was dedicated to St Chad: the Rook Street chapel, which opened in 1774, serviced about 600 people coming from as far away as Bolton, Glossop and Macclesfield. In the following years, with the advent of the Industrial Revolution, many Catholic families from Ireland were attracted to the cotton industry in Manchester. This chapel remained in use until it was destroyed by fire in 1846. St Chad's then moved to its own purpose built church in Cheetham Hill.

In the mid 1790s, the rector of St Chad's, Father Rowland Broomhead, decided to set-up a second chapel in Manchester. He purchased a plot of land near Deansgate and quickly set about the task of building a new church, which opened on 30 November 1794, and was dedicated to St Mary. Contrary to popular local myth, St Mary's was never built in secret or to be hidden, in fact the opening was announced in the local newspapers and Mulberry Street in the 1790s was a busy residential and commercial thoroughfare opening out onto Deansgate. The description of the church as a 'Hidden Gem' originated in 1872 on a visit to the church by the then Bishop of Salford, Herbert Vaughan, who remarked "No matter on what side of the church you look, you behold a hidden gem".

=== Collapse of the old church ===
In 1833 the rector of the Hidden Gem, Father Henry Gillow, judged the building to be in need of repair. He arranged for members of the congregation to undertake the re-roofing and re-decorating of the church. The absence of professional oversight by a master builder was later regarded as a significant error.

At lunchtime on 8 August 1835, a strange breaking sound could be heard. On looking up people were alarmed to see a crack forming in the dome above the altar. The church was locked up and at 11 pm the whole dome and part of the roof collapsed, damaging much of the interior of the church. Services were moved to Lloyd Street, and the search started for a new site for the church.

=== Building of the present church ===
Father Gillow died in the Manchester typhus epidemic of 1837. Any plans for a new site were put on hold, and the decision was taken to rebuild St Mary's on the existing site. Two architects were consulted, Richard Lane, the architect of Salford Town Hall and the Friends Meeting House, and Augustus Pugin. Richard Lane's design was chosen at a cost of £265 17s 0d. (Pugin had been paid £138 3s 6d). The architect chosen to oversee the work was Matthew Ellison Hadfield, who later went on to build Salford Cathedral and the new St Chad's Church, Cheetham Hill. The old St Mary's Church was entirely demolished and the new St Mary's was formally opened in October 1848. The church's design is a blend of Norman, Gothic and Byzantine detail; Pugin himself said that the building "shows to what depth of error even good men fall, when they go whoring after strange styles."

== Exterior ==
Externally, the Hidden Gem is built of plain red brick, with an ornate bell tower, stone-dressed church windows, and an entrance marked out with a fine stone doorway, which is finely carved and depicts two Angelic Hosts bearing a medallion of Agnus Dei. A hand above forms the sign of the Ascension of Christ. The inscription is "Ascendamus in montem Domini. Et adoremus in loco Sancto eius" a construction of two bible verses: "Come, let us go up to the mountain of the Lord",_{(Isaiah 2:3)} and "Praise Him in His Holy places". _{(Psalms 150:1).}

== Interior ==
Internally, there is majestic Victorian carving. The High Altar is made of marble, finely carved and life size images of Our Lady, St Stephen, St Patrick, St Peter, St John, St Hilda, St Augustine and St Joseph. Central to this, above the tabernacle, is Christ bearing the Sacred Heart. There is a Pietà Chapel and a Lady Chapel containing the Diocesan Shrine of Our Lady of Manchester. The Stations of the Cross were painted in 1994 by artist Norman Adams and are in a striking expressionist style.

== Gallery ==
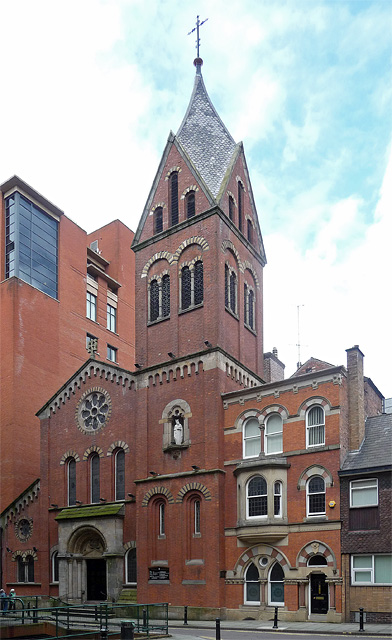
Exterior: Church and Tower

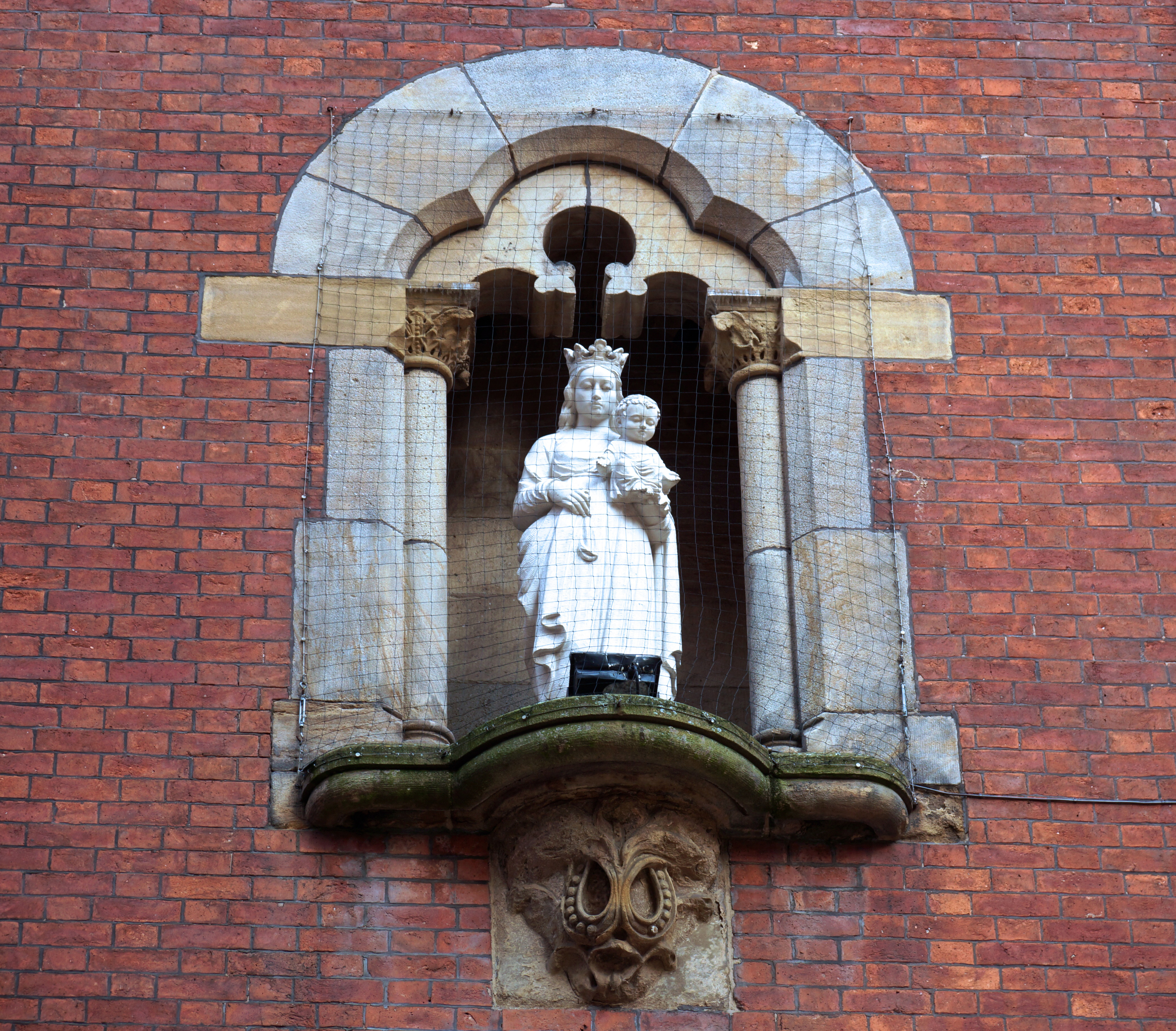
Exterior: Statue of Our Lady

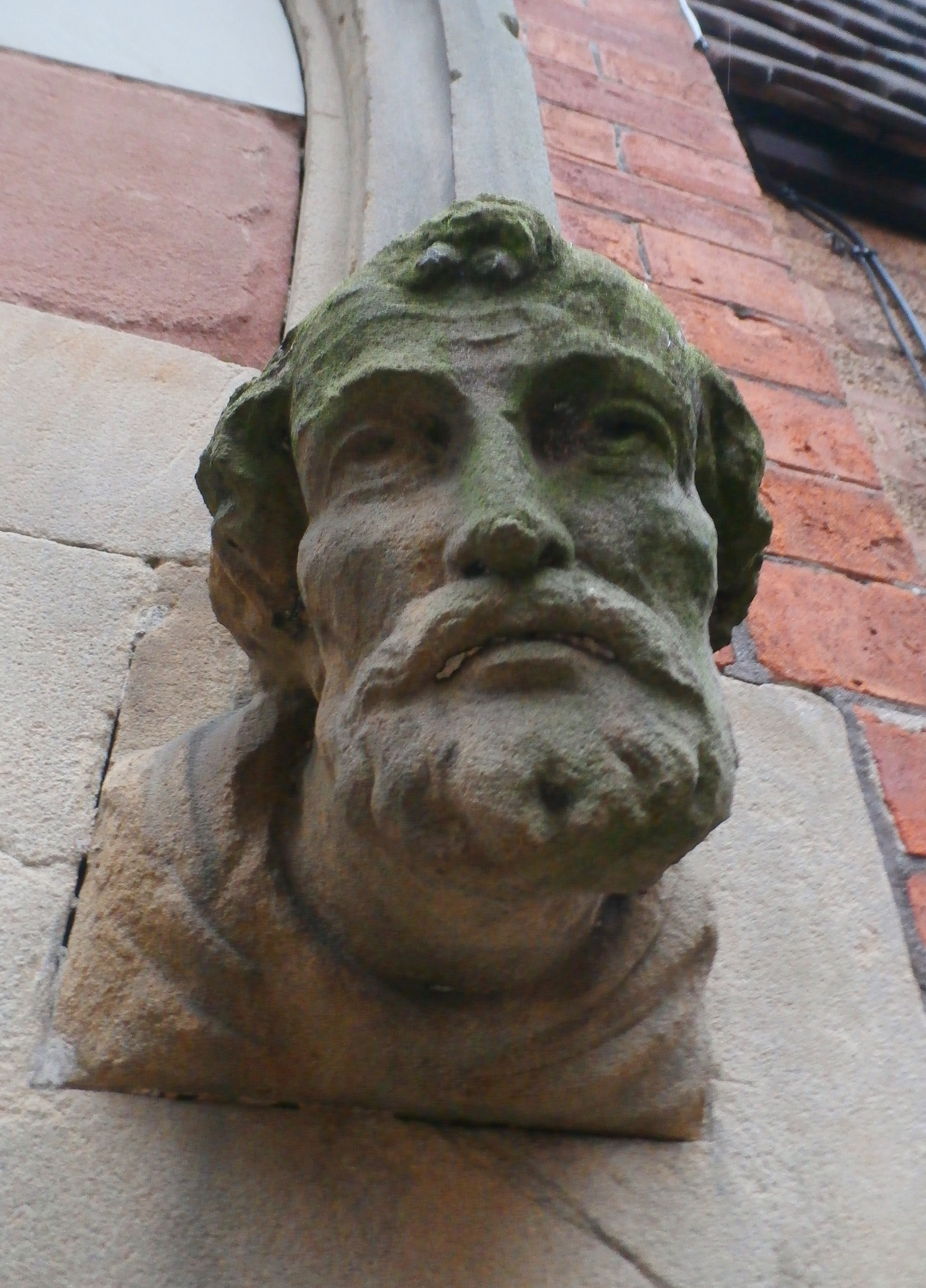
Exterior: Carving

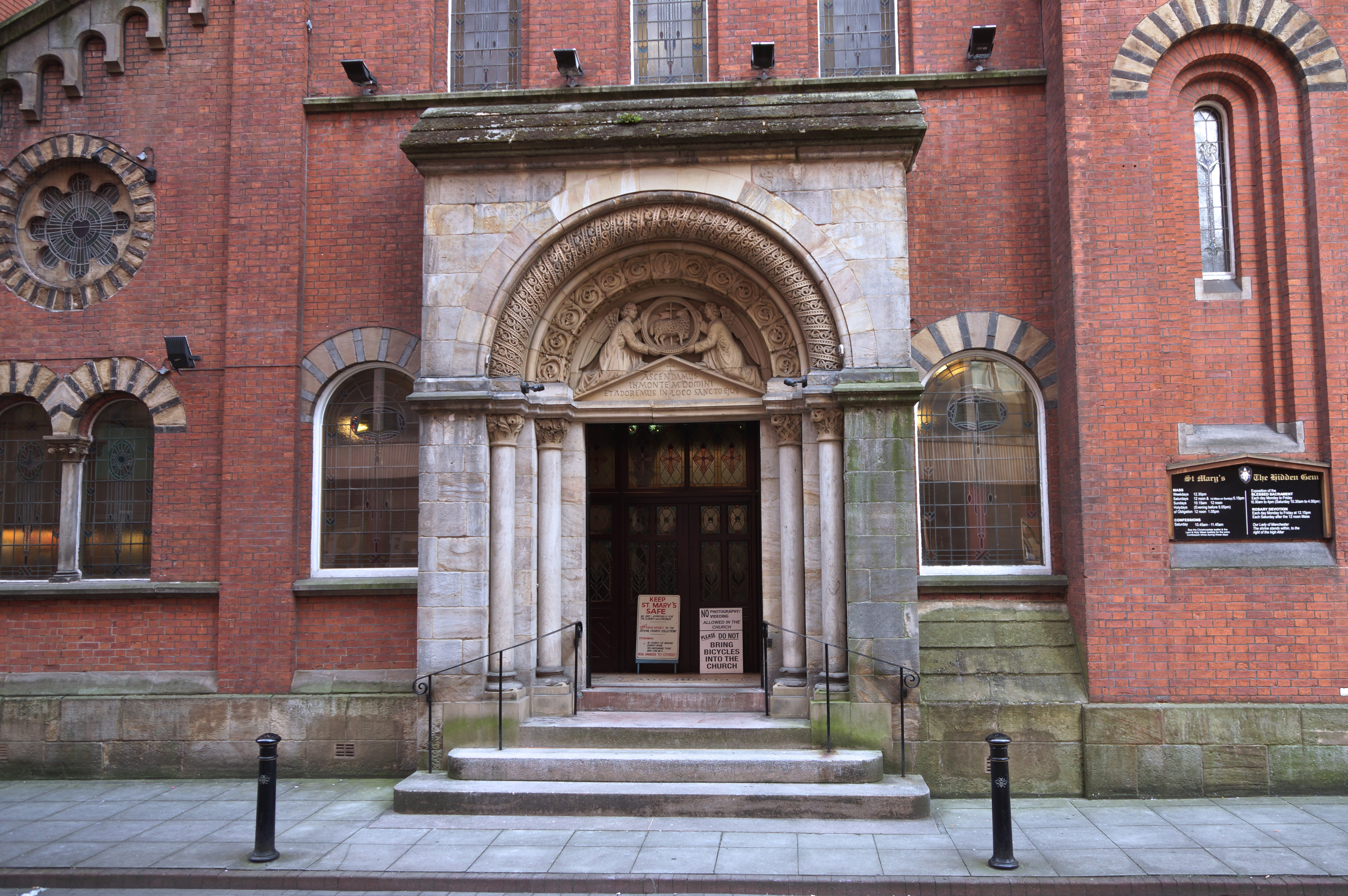
Exterior: Porch

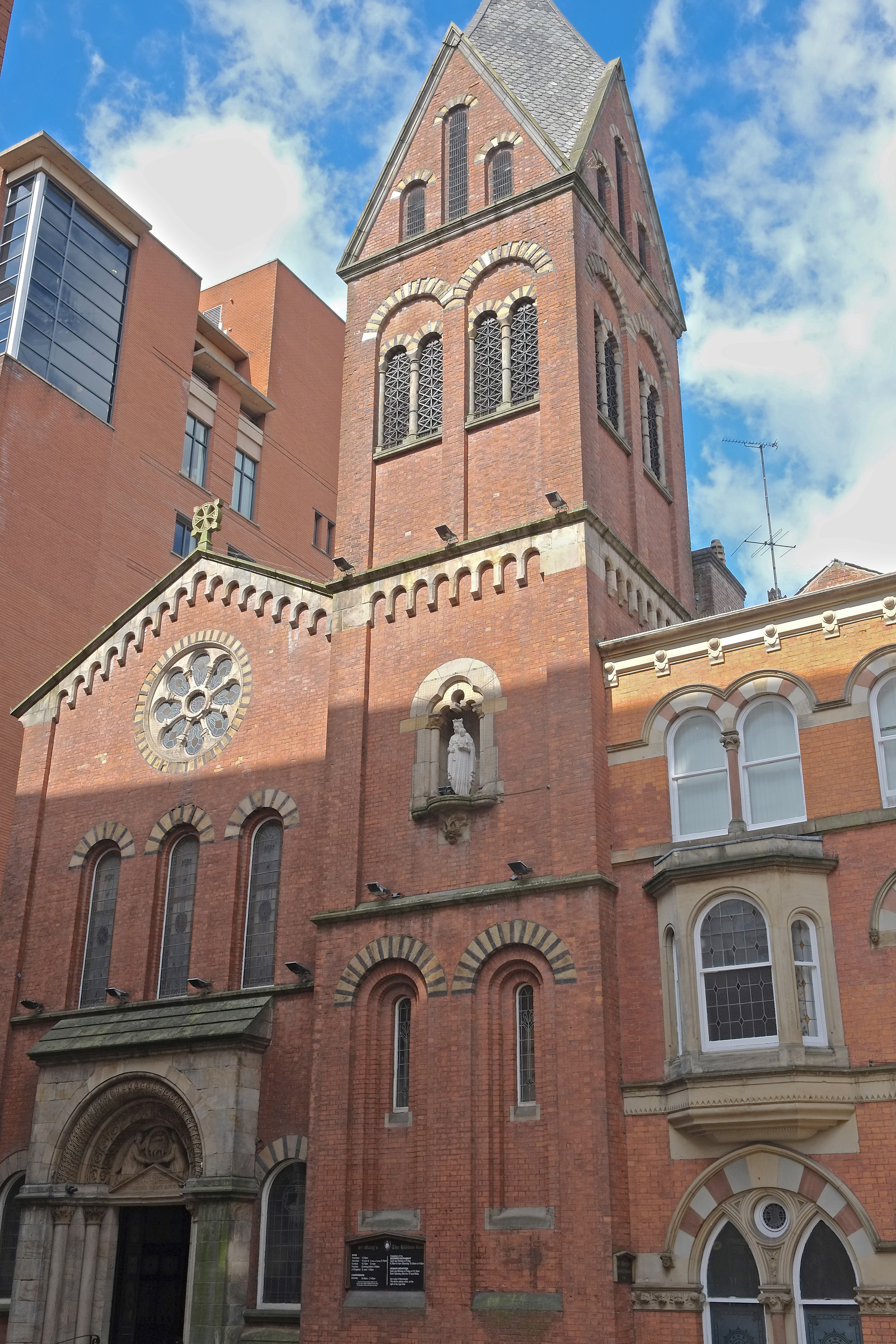
Exterior: Church and Tower

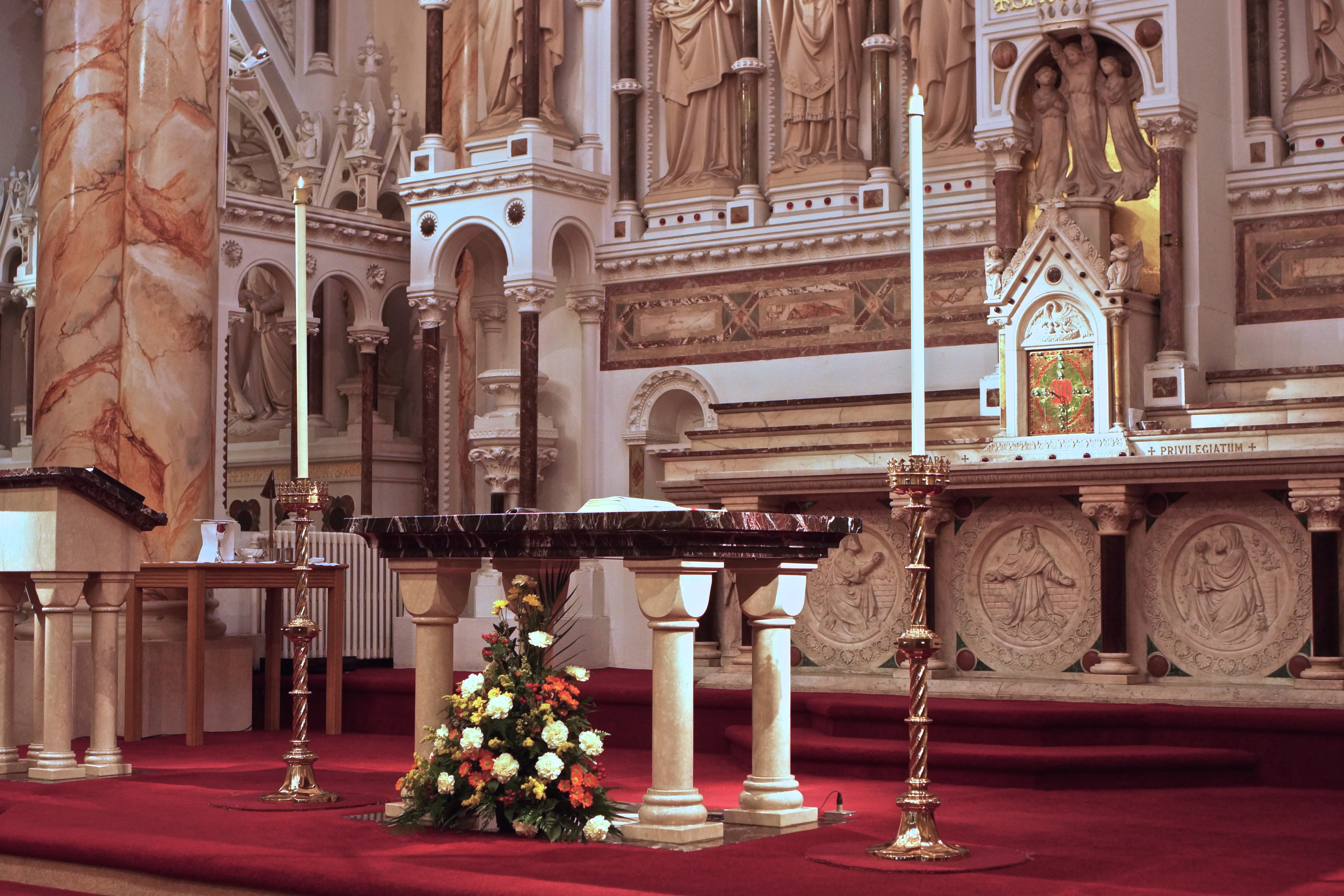
Altar and Tabernacle

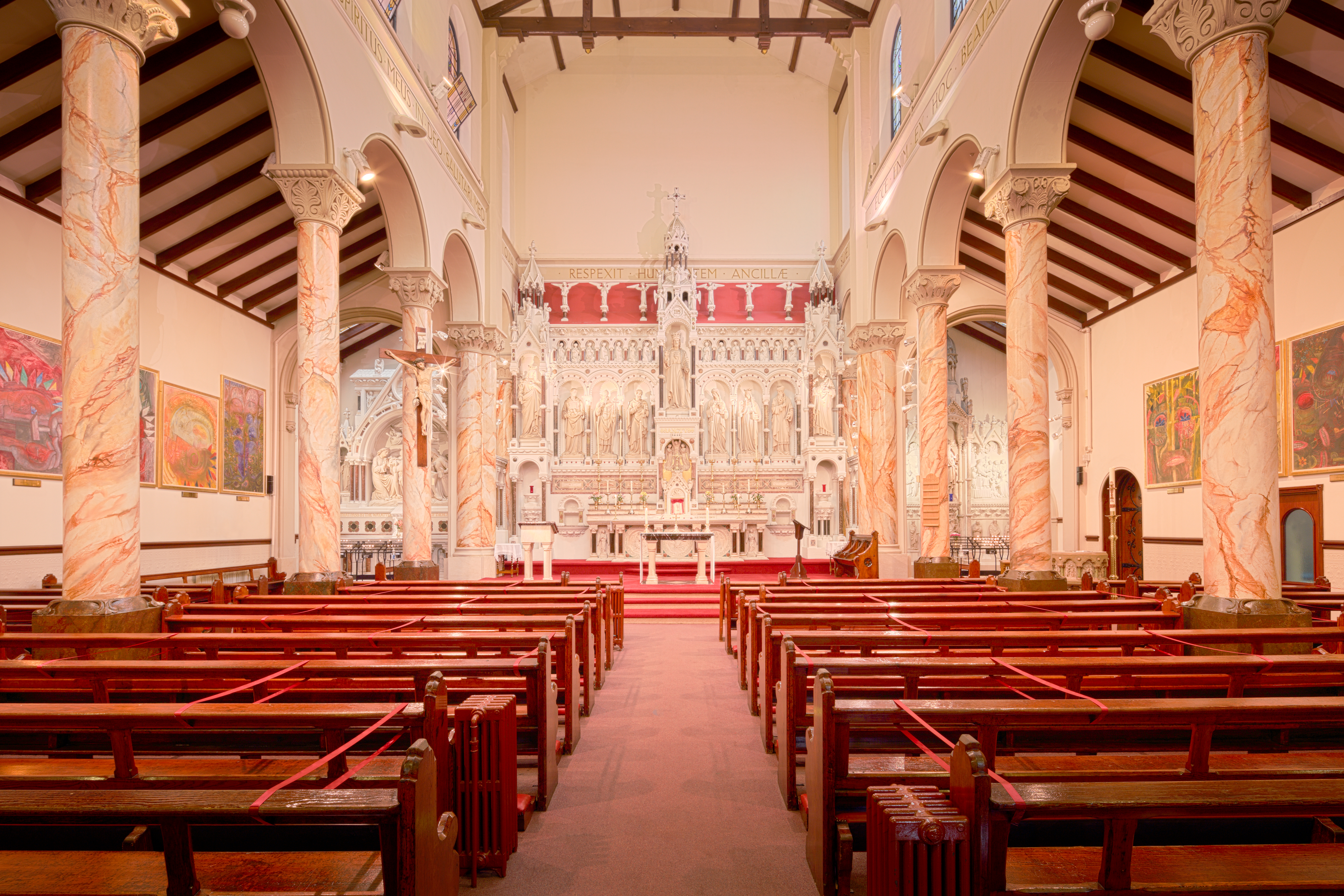
Interior: Central Nave

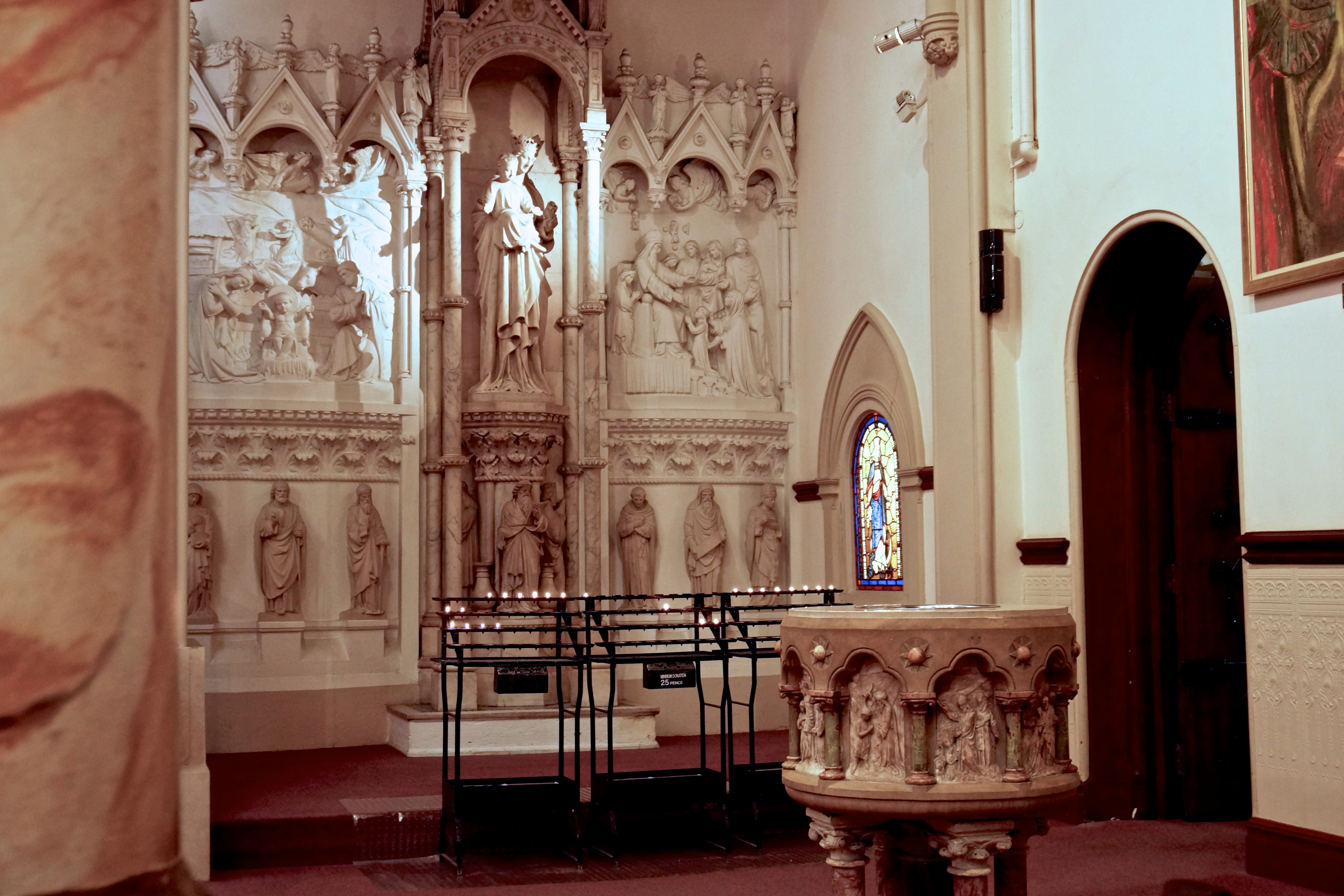
Interior: Lady Chapel and the Diocesan Shrine of Our Lady of Manchester

Interior: View across the Nave from the Pietà Chapel

== See also ==
- Diocese of Salford churches
- Grade II* listed buildings in Greater Manchester
- List of churches in Greater Manchester
- Listed buildings in Manchester-M2
