= Mr Thomas's Chop House =

Listed pub and restaurant in Manchester, England

- The building in 2024
- Former names: Mrs Sarah's Chop House
- Alternative names: James Binney House; Tom's Chop House

General information
- Type: Public house and restaurant with offices above
- Architectural style: Jacobean
- Location: 52 Cross Street, Manchester, England
- Coordinates: 53.48135°N 2.24487°W
- Year built: 1901; 125 years ago
- Renovated: Late 20th century (added)
- Owner: Punch Pubs

Design and construction
- Designations

Listed Building – Grade II
- Official name: Number 54 and Chop House public house Thomas's Chop House
- Designated: 3 October 1974
- Reference no.: 1197767

Website
- tomschophouse.com

Mr Thomas's Chop House is a Grade II listed public house and restaurant on Cross Street in Manchester, England. Founded in 1867, it occupies the ground floor of James Binney House, a free‑Jacobean terracotta building erected in 1901 to replace the original premises. Designed by Mills & Murgatroyd with a rear section by Woodhouse & Willoughby, the building is noted for its iron‑frame construction and lively street frontage. The Chop House is regarded by the Campaign for Real Ale (CAMRA) as having an interior of "outstanding national historic importance".

== History ==
James Binney House, at 52 Cross Street, stands on a site first occupied by Thomas's Chop House, founded in 1867 by Thomas and Sarah Studd. The Slater's directory for 1877–78 lists Thomas Studd at Thomas's Chop House, with the address given as St Ann's Passage, with entrances from King Street, Cross Street, and St Ann's Square. Thomas retired in 1875 due to ill health and died in 1880. Sarah took over the public house and its separate King Street dining room at a time when such establishments admitted only men. She was later succeeded by her daughter, also named Sarah, who managed the business until 1901.

The original Chop House building was demolished in 1900 and replaced the following year by the present structure, named after the barrister James Binney, who kept chambers there. The new structure was considered modern at the time because it used an iron frame rather than traditional load‑bearing masonry, a construction method then new to Manchester. The front section, designed by Mills & Murgatroyd, was built as a shop and offices, while the rear part, facing St Ann's Square and originally used by the Chop House, was designed by the architectural firm Woodhouse & Willoughby and constructed at the same time. Frank Willoughby operated the Chop House and related businesses there until 1942. The Slater's directory for 1911 records Frank Stanley Willoughby, a wholesale and retail wine and spirit merchant, beer retailer and restaurant proprietor, with a restaurant at 52 Cross Street.

The building's entrance looked across to the classical colonnade of the first Town Hall on the corner of Cross Street and King Street; the portico was removed after the town hall's demolition in 1912 and re‑erected beside the boating lake in Heaton Park.

In 1970 the site was included within the newly established St Ann's Square conservation area, and on 3 October 1974, the building was designated a Grade II listed structure. Additions were made in the late 20th century. Mr Thomas's Chop House is regarded by the Campaign for Real Ale (CAMRA) as having an interior of "outstanding national historic importance" and is rated three stars on its National Inventory of Historic Pub Interiors.

In 2019 the establishment was temporarily rebranded as Mrs Sarah's Chop House in honour of the mother‑and‑daughter team who ran it more than a century ago, with specially designed signage displayed for six weeks; it continues to trade under its historic name, Mr Thomas's Chop House, with commercial premises above. As of September 2026, the freehold was owned by Punch Pubs.

== Architecture ==
=== Exterior ===
The building is constructed in red brick with buff terracotta, with the rear section in terracotta alone, and has a slate roof. It is designed in an elaborate free‑Jacobean style. The plan is narrow and set at right angles to the street, extending deep into the plot and incorporating No. 3 St Ann's Churchyard, with three principal internal areas marked by arches and all arranged as single‑width rooms.

External detail in 2024

The street front has three storeys and an attic, with a single‑bay elevation. At ground level the left corner is chamfered and contains a doorway, with another entrance to the right and a window between them. These openings are framed by square polished‑granite pilasters that support an ornate mezzanine stage of glazed terracotta with a moulded corbel. The upper floors are dominated by a two‑storey segmental oriel rising from the corbel, with six‑light transomed windows on each level and a decorative panel between them, flanked by banded terracotta strips and a pronounced cornice. The attic has a pierced parapet above the oriel, a cross‑window, and a steep gable with corner pinnacles, an elaborately carved cartouche dated 1901, and a small broken pediment at the apex. Pevsner notes that "the corner entrance, two‑storey oriel and elaborate crowning gable combine with lively effect".

The first two bays of the return elevation follow the same treatment, after which the design becomes simpler, with square‑headed transomed windows, mostly of three lights. At the rear, No. 3 St Ann's Churchyard has a narrow convex front of buff terracotta above a brown faience base, with Renaissance‑style lettering reading "THOMAS'S CHOP HOUSE" and a first‑floor panel with putti and the date "A.1901.D".

=== Interior ===
Inside, a small entrance porch leads into a series of rooms that retain much of their early 20th-century character. The interior is particularly notable for its extensive decorative tiling, including light-green tiled dados, cream wall tiles extending to ceiling height, and black-and-white tiled floors throughout. Four principal spaces are arranged one behind another, with the central rooms separated by a wide green-tiled arch. Two rear rooms contain pairs of arches on one side, all lined with green tiling and finished with raised decorative blocks around the openings, while surviving features include linenfold panelling and a decorative ceramic fireplace. The bar counter and back fittings were installed in the late 20th century.

== See also ==
- Listed buildings in Manchester-M2
- Listed pubs in Greater Manchester
